= 1986 AFC Night Series =

AFC Foster's Football Cup

Tournament details
- Dates: 1 March – 1 July 1986
- Teams: 14
- Venue: 2 (in 2 host cities)

Final positions
- Champions: Hawthorn (2nd title)
- Runners-up: Carlton

Tournament statistics
- Matches played: 15
- Attendance: 111,620 (7,441 per match)

The 1986 Australian Football Championships Night Series was the 8th edition of the AFC Night Series, a VFL-organised national club Australian rules football tournament between the leading clubs from the VFL and the SANFL.

The 1986 Series would be the last to be played under the AFC banner as the VFL began its transformation from a state league to a national competition with the introduction of two interstate expansion clubs, the Brisbane Bears and the West Coast Eagles. As a result, the AFC Board was disbanded and the following year's Night Series was reverted to a VFL-run competition featuring only the VFL teams.

== Qualified teams ==
Team	Nickname	League	Qualification	Participation (bold indicates winners)^{1}
Essendon	Bombers	VFL	Winners of the 1985 Victorian Football League	10th (Previous: **1893**, 1911, 1979, 1980, **1981**, 1982, 1983, **1984**, 1985)
Hawthorn	Hawks	VFL	Runners-Up in the 1985 Victorian Football League	10th (Previous: **1971**, **1976**, 1979, 1980, 1981, 1982, 1983, 1984, **1985**)
Footscray	Bulldogs	VFL	Third Place in the 1985 Victorian Football League	9th (Previous: 1976, 1979, 1980, 1981, 1982, 1983, 1984, 1985)
North Melbourne	Kangaroos	VFL	Fourth Place in the 1985 Victorian Football League	10th (Previous: **1975**, 1976, 1979, **1980**, 1981, 1982, 1983, 1984, 1985)
Carlton	Blues	VFL	Fifth Place in the 1985 Victorian Football League	15th (Previous: 1907, 1908, 1914, **1968**, **1970**, 1972, 1976, 1979, 1980, 1981, 1982, **1983**, 1984, 1985)
Geelong	Cats	VFL	Sixth Place in the 1985 Victorian Football League	8th (Previous: 1979, 1980, 1981, 1982, 1983, 1984, 1985)
Collingwood	Magpies	VFL	Seventh Place in the 1985 Victorian Football League	10th (Previous: **1896**, 1910, **1979**, 1980, 1981, 1982, 1983, 1984, 1985)
Richmond	Tigers	VFL	Eighth Place in the 1985 Victorian Football League	12th (Previous: **1969**, **1973**, **1974**, 1976, 1979, 1980, 1981, 1982, 1983, 1984, 1985)
Fitzroy	Lions	VFL	Ninth Place in the 1985 Victorian Football League	9th (Previous: 1913, 1979, 1980, 1981, 1982, 1983, 1984, 1985)
Sydney	Swans	VFL	Tenth Place in the 1985 Victorian Football League	11th (Previous: 1888, 1890, **1909**, 1979, 1980, 1981, **1982**, 1983, 1984, 1985)
Melbourne	Demons	VFL	Eleventh Place in the 1985 Victorian Football League	8th (Previous: 1979, 1980, 1981, 1982, 1983, 1984, 1985)
St Kilda	Saints	VFL	Twelfth Place in the 1985 Victorian Football League	8th (Previous: 1979, 1980, 1981, 1982, 1983, 1984, 1985)
Glenelg	Tigers	SANFL	Winners of the 1985 South Australian National Football League	10th (Previous: 1973, 1976, 1977, 1978, 1979, 1980, 1981, 1982, 1983)
North Adelaide	Roosters	SANFL	Runners-Up in the 1985 South Australian National Football League	7th (Previous: 1971, **1972**, 1977, 1979, 1980, 1981)

^{1} Includes previous appearances in the Championship of Australia and NFL Night Series.

== Venues ==
Melbourne	Adelaide
Waverley Park	Football Park
Capacity: 72,000	Capacity: 67,000

== Knockout stage ==
=== Round 1 ===
1 March 1986	Carlton	71–45	Sydney	Waverley Park, Melbourne
	9.17 (71)		6.9 (45)	Attendance: 15,129

4 March 1986	North Melbourne	100–55	St Kilda	Waverley Park, Melbourne
	15.10 (100)		8.7 (55)	Attendance: 6,207

11 March 1986	Glenelg	74–105	Footscray	Football Park, Adelaide
	10.14 (74)		16.9 (105)	Attendance: 3,923

18 March 1986	Fitzroy	86–60	Collingwood	Waverley Park, Melbourne
	12.14 (86)		9.6 (60)	Attendance: 10,508

1 April 1986	Essendon	114–50	Richmond	Waverley Park, Melbourne
	18.6 (114)		7.8 (50)	Attendance: 10,518

8 April 1986	Hawthorn	131–65	Geelong	Waverley Park, Melbourne
	19.17 (131)		10.5 (65)	Attendance: 5,035

15 April 1986	North Adelaide	88–61	Melbourne	Football Park, Adelaide
	13.10 (88)		8.13 (61)	Attendance: 2,933

=== Lucky loser playoff ===
22 April 1986	Collingwood	80–43	Sydney	Waverley Park, Melbourne
	12.8 (80)		6.7 (43)	Attendance: 6,217

=== Quarter-finals ===
QF #1 29 April 1986	Carlton	112–77	North Melbourne	Waverley Park, Melbourne
	16.16 (112)		11.11 (77)	Attendance: 4,371

QF #2 6 May 1986	Collingwood	59–67	North Adelaide	Waverley Park, Melbourne
	9.5 (59)		8.19 (67)	Attendance: 3,146

QF #3 20 May 1986	Hawthorn	62–43	Essendon	Waverley Park, Melbourne
	8.14 (62)		6.7 (43)	Attendance: 11,284

QF #4 27 May 1986	Footscray	85–55	Fitzroy	Waverley Park, Melbourne
	12.13 (85)		8.7 (55)	Attendance: 3,415

=== Semi-finals ===
SF #1 3 June 1986	Hawthorn	150–60	North Adelaide	Waverley Park, Melbourne
	23.12 (150)		8.12 (60)	Attendance: 3,320

SF #2 24 June 1986	Carlton	79–60	Footscray	Waverley Park, Melbourne
	11.13 (79)		9.6 (60)	Attendance: 5,987

=== Australian Football Championships Night Series Final ===
Final 1 July 1986	Hawthorn	66–36	Carlton	Waverley Park, Melbourne
	1.2 (8); 2.3 (15); 4.5 (29); 9.12 (66)		0.0 (0); 0.3 (3); 5.6 (36); 5.6 (36)	Attendance: 19,627; Umpires: Russo, Castle
		Goals
	Platten 3 Buckenara, Dunstall 2 Eade, Brereton 1		Murphy, Evans, Bradley, Maclure, Blackwell 1
