= 1985 AFC Night Series =

AFC Foster's Football Cup

Tournament details
- Dates: 9 March – 23 July 1985
- Teams: 17
- Venue: 3 (in 3 host cities)

Final positions
- Champions: Hawthorn (1st title)
- Runners-up: Essendon

Tournament statistics
- Matches played: 16
- Attendance: 97,922 (6,120 per match)

The 1985 Australian Football Championships Night Series was the 7th edition of the AFC Night Series, a VFL-organised national club Australian rules football tournament between the leading clubs from the VFL, the SANFL, the WAFL and State Representative Teams.

A total of 17 teams from across Australia played 16 matches over five months, with matches held during the pre-season and midweek throughout the premiership season.

== Qualified Teams ==
Team	Nickname	League	Qualification	Participation (bold indicates winners)^{1}
Enter in Round 1
Essendon	Bombers	VFL	Winners of the 1984 Victorian Football League	9th (Previous: **1893**, 1911, 1979, 1980, **1981**, 1982, 1983, **1984**)
Hawthorn	Hawks	VFL	Runners-Up in the 1984 Victorian Football League	9th (Previous: **1971**, **1976**, 1979, 1980, 1981, 1982, 1983, 1984)
Collingwood	Magpies	VFL	Third Place in the 1984 Victorian Football League	9th (Previous: **1896**, 1910, **1979**, 1980, 1981, 1982, 1983, 1984)
Carlton	Blues	VFL	Fourth Place in the 1984 Victorian Football League	14th (Previous: 1907, 1908, 1914, **1968**, **1970**, 1972, 1976, 1979, 1980, 1981, 1982, **1983**, 1984)
Fitzroy	Lions	VFL	Fifth Place in the 1984 Victorian Football League	8th (Previous: 1913, 1979, 1980, 1981, 1982, 1983, 1984)
Geelong	Cats	VFL	Sixth Place in the 1984 Victorian Football League	7th (Previous: 1979, 1980, 1981, 1982, 1983, 1984)
Footscray	Bulldogs	VFL	Seventh Place in the 1984 Victorian Football League	8th (Previous: 1976, 1979, 1980, 1981, 1982, 1983, 1984)
Richmond	Tigers	VFL	Eighth Place in the 1984 Victorian Football League	11th (Previous: **1969**, **1973**, **1974**, 1976, 1979, 1980, 1981, 1982, 1983, 1984)
Melbourne	Demons	VFL	Ninth Place in the 1984 Victorian Football League	7th (Previous: 1979, 1980, 1981, 1982, 1983, 1984)
Sydney	Swans	VFL	Tenth Place in the 1984 Victorian Football League	10th (Previous: 1888, 1890, **1909**, 1979, 1980, 1981, **1982**, 1983, 1984)
North Melbourne	Kangaroos	VFL	Eleventh Place in the 1984 Victorian Football League	9th (Previous: **1975**, 1976, 1979, **1980**, 1981, 1982, 1983, 1984)
Norwood	Redlegs	SANFL	Winners of the 1984 South Australian National Football League	12th (Previous: **1888**, **1907**, 1975, 1976, **1977**, 1978, 1979, 1980, 1981, 1982, 1983)
Port Adelaide	Magpies	SANFL	Runners-Up in the 1984 South Australian National Football League	12th (Previous: **1890**, **1910**, **1913**, **1914**, 1976, 1977, 1978, 1979, 1980, 1981, 1982)
Swan Districts	Swans	WAFL	Winners of the 1984 West Australian Football League	6th (Previous: 1976, 1979, 1980, 1981, 1982)
East Fremantle	Sharks	WAFL	Runners-Up in the 1984 West Australian Football League	7th (Previous: 1974, 1977, 1978, 1979, 1980, 1981)
Enter in Qualifying Playoff
St Kilda	Saints	VFL	Twelfth Place in the 1984 Victorian Football League	7th (Previous: 1979, 1980, 1981, 1982, 1983, 1984)
Queensland	Maroons	QAFL	Winners of the 1984 Escort Shield	6th (Previous: 1977, 1978, 1980, 1981, 1984)

^{1} Includes previous appearances in the Championship of Australia and NFL Night Series.

== Venues ==
Melbourne	Adelaide	Brisbane
Waverley Park	Football Park	John Wren Oval
Capacity: 72,000	Capacity: 67,000	Capacity: 10,000

== Knockout stage ==
=== Qualifying Playoff ===
9 March 1985	Queensland	69–165	St Kilda	John Wren Oval, Brisbane
	10.9 (69)		26.9 (165)	Attendance: 3,000

=== Round 1 ===
13 March 1985	Carlton	108–76	Melbourne	Waverley Park, Melbourne
	17.6 (108)		12.4 (76)	Attendance: 7,773

19 March 1985	Richmond	89–68	East Fremantle	Waverley Park, Melbourne
	13.11 (89)		9.14 (68)	Attendance: 3,673

2 April 1985	Collingwood	105–23	Sydney	Waverley Park, Melbourne
	15.15 (105)		3.5 (23)	Attendance: 5,097

16 April 1985	Port Adelaide	92–111	Hawthorn	Football Park, Adelaide
	14.8 (92)		16.15 (111)	Attendance: 3,165

23 April 1985	Footscray	87–62	North Melbourne	Waverley Park, Melbourne
	11.21 (87)		9.8 (62)	Attendance: 3,441

30 April 1985	Fitzroy	184–93	Swan Districts	Waverley Park, Melbourne
	27.22 (184)		14.9 (93)	Attendance: 1,988

7 May 1985	Essendon	64–27	St Kilda	Waverley Park, Melbourne
	9.10 (64)		3.9 (27)	Attendance: 5,906

21 May 1985	Norwood	83–44	Geelong	Football Park, Adelaide
	12.11 (84)		5.14 (44)	Attendance: 7,448

=== Quarter-finals ===
QF #1 28 May 1985	Carlton	76–35	Richmond	Waverley Park, Melbourne
	11.10 (76)		5.5 (35)	Attendance: 5,616

QF #2 5 June 1985	Hawthorn	140–53	Collingwood	Waverley Park, Melbourne
	21.14 (140)		8.5 (53)	Attendance: 5,453

QF #3 18 June 1985	Fitzroy	117–56	Footscray	Waverley Park, Melbourne
	17.15 (117)		8.8 (56)	Attendance: 2,598

QF #4 25 June 1985	Norwood	85–138	Essendon	Football Park, Adelaide
	13.7 (85)		21.12 (138)	Attendance: 6,030

=== Semi-finals ===
SF #1 2 July 1985	Hawthorn	115–70	Carlton	Waverley Park, Melbourne
	17.13 (115)		10.10 (70)	Attendance: 6,077

SF #2 9 July 1985	Essendon	125–42	Fitzroy	Waverley Park, Melbourne
	20.5 (125)		6.6 (42)	Attendance: 5,845

=== Australian Football Championships Night Series final ===
Final 23 July 1985	Hawthorn	77–68	Essendon	Waverley Park, Melbourne
	3.2 (20); 4.4 (28); 9.8 (62); 11.11 (77)		1.2 (8); 3.5 (23); 9.6 (60); 10.8 (68)	Attendance: 24,812; Umpires: Cameron, James
		Goals
	Dipierdomenico 3 Brereton, Kennedy, Handley 2 Loveridge, Schwab 1		Harvey 4 Ezard 3 Williams, Elshaug, Watson 1
