= 1984 AFC Night Series =

AFC Sterling Cup

Tournament details
- Dates: 6 March – 24 July 1984
- Teams: 17
- Venue: 3 (in 3 host cities)

Final positions
- Champions: Essendon (2nd title)
- Runners-up: Sydney

Tournament statistics
- Matches played: 16
- Attendance: 119,777 (7,486 per match)

The 1984 Australian Football Championships Night Series was the 6th edition of the AFC Night Series, a VFL-organised national club Australian rules football tournament between the leading clubs from the VFL, the SANFL, the WAFL and State Representative Teams.

A total of 17 teams from across Australia played 16 matches over five months, with matches held during the pre-season and midweek throughout the premiership season.

== Qualified Teams ==
Team	Nickname	League	Qualification	Participation (bold indicates winners)^{1}
Enter in Round 1
Hawthorn	Hawks	VFL	Winners of the 1983 Victorian Football League	8th (Previous: **1971**, **1976**, 1979, 1980, 1981, 1982, 1983)
Essendon	Bombers	VFL	Runners-Up in the 1983 Victorian Football League	8th (Previous: **1893**, 1911, 1979, 1980, **1981**, 1982, 1983)
North Melbourne	Kangaroos	VFL	Third Place in the 1983 Victorian Football League	8th (Previous: **1975**, 1976, 1979, **1980**, 1981, 1982, 1983)
Fitzroy	Lions	VFL	Fourth Place in the 1983 Victorian Football League	7th (Previous: 1913, 1979, 1980, 1981, 1982, 1983)
Carlton	Blues	VFL	Fifth Place in the 1983 Victorian Football League	13th (Previous: 1907, 1908, 1914, **1968**, **1970**, 1972, 1976, 1979, 1980, 1981, 1982, **1983**)
Collingwood	Magpies	VFL	Sixth Place in the 1983 Victorian Football League	8th (Previous: **1896**, 1910, **1979**, 1980, 1981, 1982, 1983)
Footscray	Bulldogs	VFL	Seventh Place in the 1983 Victorian Football League	7th (Previous: 1976, 1979, 1980, 1981, 1982, 1983)
Melbourne	Demons	VFL	Eighth Place in the 1983 Victorian Football League	6th (Previous: 1979, 1980, 1981, 1982, 1983)
Geelong	Cats	VFL	Ninth Place in the 1983 Victorian Football League	6th (Previous: 1979, 1980, 1981, 1982, 1983)
Richmond	Tigers	VFL	Tenth Place in the 1983 Victorian Football League	10th (Previous: **1969**, **1973**, **1974**, 1976, 1979, 1980, 1981, 1982, 1983)
Sydney	Swans	VFL	Eleventh Place in the 1983 Victorian Football League	9th (Previous: 1888, 1890, **1909**, 1979, 1980, 1981, **1982**, 1983)
West Adelaide	Bloods	SANFL	Winners of the 1983 South Australian National Football League	9th (Previous: **1908**, 1909, **1911**, 1977, 1978, 1979, 1980, 1981)
Sturt	Double Blues	SANFL	Runners-Up in the 1983 South Australian National Football League	10th (Previous: 1968, 1969, 1970, 1974, 1976, 1977, 1979, 1980, 1981)
Claremont	Tigers	WAFL	Runners-Up in the 1983 West Australian Football League	7th (Previous: 1977, 1979, 1980, 1981, 1982, 1983)
South Fremantle	Bulldogs	WAFL	Third Place in the 1983 West Australian Football League^{2}	7th (Previous: 1976, 1977, 1979, 1980, 1981, 1982)
Enter in Qualifying Playoff
St Kilda	Saints	VFL	Twelfth Place in the 1983 Victorian Football League	6th (Previous: 1979, 1980, 1981, 1982, 1983)
Queensland	Maroons	QAFL	Winners of the 1983 Escort Shield	5th (Previous: 1977, 1978, 1980, 1981)

^{1} Includes previous appearances in the Championship of Australia and NFL Night Series.
^{2} Replaced Swan Districts who was banned for two years by the AFC for fielding a Reserves-Colts side in their 1982 Quarter-final loss to Richmond.

== Venues ==
Melbourne	Adelaide	Brisbane
Waverley Park	Football Park	Keith Beavis Oval
Capacity: 72,000	Capacity: 67,000	Capacity: 10,000

== Knockout stage ==
=== Qualifying Playoff ===
18 March 1984	Queensland	75–86	St Kilda	Keith Beavis Oval, Brisbane
	11.9 (75)		12.14 (86)	Attendance: 8,000

=== Round 1 ===
6 March 1984	Essendon	110–47	North Melbourne	Waverley Park, Melbourne
	15.20 (110)		7.5 (47)	Attendance: 9,178

13 March 1984	Collingwood	84–48	Claremont	Waverley Park, Melbourne
	12.12 (84)		5.18 (48)	Attendance: 4,194

20 March 1984	Hawthorn	121–74	Richmond	Waverley Park, Melbourne
	18.13 (121)		11.8 (74)	Attendance: 7,183

3 April 1984	West Adelaide	60–87	Footscray	Football Park, Adelaide
	8.12 (60)		11.21 (87)	Attendance: 3,291

1 May 1984	St Kilda	102–87	South Fremantle	Waverley Park, Melbourne
	15.12 (102)		12.15 (87)	Attendance: 3,206

8 May 1984	Carlton	66–65	Geelong	Waverley Park, Melbourne
	10.6 (66)		9.11 (65)	Attendance: 7,898

22 May 1984	Sydney	101–32	Fitzroy	Waverley Park, Melbourne
	14.17 (101)		4.8 (32)	Attendance: 3,873

29 May 1984	Sturt	77–93	Melbourne	Football Park, Adelaide
	11.11 (77)		14.9 (97)	Attendance: 3,709

=== Quarter-finals ===
QF #1 5 June 1984	Essendon	86–35	Collingwood	Waverley Park, Melbourne
	12.14 (86)		5.5 (35)	Attendance: 13,776

QF #2 12 June 1984	Sydney	85–46	St Kilda	Waverley Park, Melbourne
	12.13 (85)		7.4 (46)	Attendance: 3,521

QF #3 19 June 1984	Hawthorn	104–73	Footscray	Waverley Park, Melbourne
	14.20 (104)		11.7 (73)	Attendance: 3,763

QF #4 26 June 1984	Carlton	93–78	Melbourne	Waverley Park, Melbourne
	14.9 (93)		11.12 (78)	Attendance: 5,779

=== Semi-finals ===
SF #1 3 July 1984	Essendon	72–57	Hawthorn	Waverley Park, Melbourne
	10.12 (72)		7.15 (57)	Attendance: 5,849

SF #2 10 July 1984	Sydney	102–81	Carlton	Waverley Park, Melbourne
	15.12 (102)		12.9 (81)	Attendance: 5,303

=== Australian Football Championships Night Series final ===
Final 24 July 1984	Essendon	89–38	Sydney	Waverley Park, Melbourne
	1.2 (8); 4.6 (30); 7.9 (51); 13.11 (89)		1.4 (10); 1.5 (11); 2.6 (18); 5.8 (38)	Attendance: 30,824; Umpires: Sawers, James
		Goals
	Merrett, Baker 3 Ezard 2 Neagle, Elshaug, Eustice, Thompson, Madden 1		Hawke, Wright, Mitchell, Rhys-Jones, Capper 1
