= 1983 AFC Night Series =

AFC Sterling Cup

Tournament details
- Dates: 8 March – 26 July 1983
- Teams: 17
- Venue: 2 (in 2 host cities)

Final positions
- Champions: Carlton (1st title)
- Runners-up: Richmond

Tournament statistics
- Matches played: 16
- Attendance: 112,719 (7,045 per match)

The 1983 Australian Football Championships Night Series was the 5th edition of the AFC Night Series, a VFL-organised national club Australian rules football tournament between the leading clubs from the VFL, the SANFL, the WAFL and State Representative Teams.

A total of 17 teams from across Australia played 16 matches over five months, with matches held during the pre-season and midweek throughout the premiership season.

== Qualified Teams ==
Team	Nickname	League	Qualification	Participation (bold indicates winners)^{1}
Enter in Round 1
Carlton	Blues	VFL	Winners of the 1982 Victorian Football League	12th (Previous: 1907, 1908, 1914, **1968**, **1970**, 1972, 1976, 1979, 1980, 1981, 1982)
Richmond	Tigers	VFL	Runners-Up in the 1982 Victorian Football League	9th (Previous: **1969**, **1973**, **1974**, 1976, 1979, 1980, 1981, 1982)
Hawthorn	Hawks	VFL	Third Place in the 1982 Victorian Football League	7th (Previous: **1971**, **1976**, 1979, 1980, 1981, 1982)
North Melbourne	Kangaroos	VFL	Fourth Place in the 1982 Victorian Football League	7th (Previous: **1975**, 1976, 1979, **1980**, 1981, 1982)
Essendon	Bombers	VFL	Fifth Place in the 1982 Victorian Football League	7th (Previous: **1893**, 1911, 1979, 1980, **1981**, 1982)
Fitzroy	Lions	VFL	Sixth Place in the 1982 Victorian Football League	6th (Previous: 1913, 1979, 1980, 1981, 1982)
Sydney	Swans	VFL	Seventh Place in the 1982 Victorian Football League	8th (Previous: 1888, 1890, **1909**, 1979, 1980, 1981, **1982**)
Melbourne	Demons	VFL	Eighth Place in the 1982 Victorian Football League	5th (Previous: 1979, 1980, 1981, 1982)
Geelong	Cats	VFL	Ninth Place in the 1982 Victorian Football League	5th (Previous: 1979, 1980, 1981, 1982)
Collingwood	Magpies	VFL	Tenth Place in the 1982 Victorian Football League	7th (Previous: **1896**, 1910, **1979**, 1980, 1981, 1982)
St Kilda	Saints	VFL	Eleventh Place in the 1982 Victorian Football League	5th (Previous: 1979, 1980, 1981, 1982)
Norwood	Redlegs	SANFL	Winners of the 1982 South Australian National Football League	11th (Previous: **1888**, **1907**, 1975, 1976, **1977**, 1978, 1979, 1980, 1981, 1982)
Glenelg	Tigers	SANFL	Runners-Up in the 1982 South Australian National Football League	9th (Previous: 1973, 1976, 1977, 1978, 1979, 1980, 1981, 1982)
Claremont	Tigers	WAFL	Runners-Up in the 1982 West Australian Football League	6th (Previous: 1977, 1979, 1980, 1981, 1982)
West Perth	Falcons	WAFL	Third Place in the 1982 West Australian Football League^{2}	8th (Previous: 1975, 1976, 1977, 1978, 1979, 1980, 1981)
Enter in Qualifying Playoff
Footscray	Bulldogs	VFL	Twelfth Place in the 1982 Victorian Football League	6th (Previous: 1976, 1979, 1980, 1981, 1982)
Tasmania	Devils	TANFL	Winners of the 1982 Escort Shield	7th (Previous: 1974, 1977, 1978, 1979, 1980, 1981)

^{1} Includes previous appearances in the Championship of Australia and NFL Night Series.
^{2} Replaced Swan Districts who was banned for two years by the AFC for fielding a Reserves-Colts side in their 1982 Quarter-final loss to Richmond.

== Venues ==
Melbourne	Hobart
Waverley Park	KGV Oval
Capacity: 72,000	Capacity: 12,000

== Knockout stage ==
=== Qualifying Playoff ===
19 March 1983	Tasmania	38–146	Footscray	KGV Oval, Hobart
	4.14 (38)		21.20 (146)	Attendance: 4,135

=== Round 1 ===
8 March 1983	Carlton	66–50	Fitzroy	Waverley Park, Melbourne
	9.12 (66)		6.14 (50)	Attendance: 7,487

15 March 1983	Sydney	102–71	West Perth	Waverley Park, Melbourne
	15.12 (102)		10.11 (71)	Attendance: 2,518

29 March 1983	North Melbourne	78–62	Melbourne	Waverley Park, Melbourne
	11.12 (78)		8.14 (62)	Attendance: 6,185

12 April 1983	Geelong	92–36	Glenelg	Waverley Park, Melbourne
	13.14 (92)		5.6 (36)	Attendance: 2,684

19 April 1983	Hawthorn	100–70	Essendon	Waverley Park, Melbourne
	15.10 (100)		11.4 (70)	Attendance: 8,861

26 April 1983	Collingwood	111–59	Claremont	Waverley Park, Melbourne
	16.15 (111)		7.17 (59)	Attendance: 5,699

3 May 1983	Richmond	95–81	St Kilda	Waverley Park, Melbourne
	14.11 (95)		12.9 (81)	Attendance: 6,703

10 May 1983	Footscray	77–93	Norwood	Waverley Park, Melbourne
	11.11 (77)		14.9 (97)	Attendance: 1,145

=== Quarter–finals ===
QF #1 24 May 1983	Carlton	83–41	Sydney	Waverley Park, Melbourne
	12.11 (83)		6.5 (41)	Attendance: 4,879

QF #2 31 May 1983	North Melbourne	88–81	Geelong	Waverley Park, Melbourne
	14.4 (88)		12.9 (81)	Attendance: 4,317

QF #3 7 June 1983	Hawthorn	65–63	Collingwood	Waverley Park, Melbourne
	9.11 (65)		8.15 (63)	Attendance: 8,326

QF #4 21 June 1983	Richmond	121–66	Norwood	Waverley Park, Melbourne
	18.13 (121)		10.6 (66)	Attendance: 4,510

=== Semi–finals ===
SF #1 28 June 1983	Carlton	84–54	North Melbourne	Waverley Park, Melbourne
	12.12 (84)		7.12 (54)	Attendance: 4,541

SF #2 5 July 1983	Richmond	99–74	Hawthorn	Waverley Park, Melbourne
	15.9 (99)		11.8 (74)	Attendance: 7,622

=== Australian Football Championships Night Series final ===
Final 26 July 1983	Carlton	100–66	Richmond	Waverley Park, Melbourne
	2.7 (19); 8.7 (55); 12.9 (81); 14.16 (100)		1.0 (6); 2.2 (14); 5.5 (35); 10.6 (66)	Attendance: 32,927; Umpires: Smith, Nash
		Goals
	Ashman 3 Bosustow, Johnston, Howell, Glascott 2 Marchesani, M.Buckley, Williams 1		Roach 4 Egan 2 Wiley, Landy, Foley, Lovett 1
