= 1982 Escort Championships =

1982 AFC Night Series
AFC Escort Championships

Tournament details
- Dates: 9 March – 20 July 1982
- Teams: 18
- Venue: 3 (in 3 host cities)

Final positions
- Champions: Swans (1st title)
- Runners-up: North Melbourne

Tournament statistics
- Matches played: 17
- Attendance: 107,906 (6,347 per match)

The 1982 Escort Championships (also known as the Escort Cup) was an Australian rules football knockout tournament held between March and July 1982. The tournament was organised by Australian Football Championships, and was contested by teams from the Victorian Football League, South Australian National Football League and West Australian Football League. The tournament was won by the Swans^{N 1}, who defeated North Melbourne in the Grand Final.

== Background ==
The 1982 Escort Championships was the sixth season of the national night premiership competition. The size of the competition was reduced to 18 teams in 1982, after 34 teams had competed in each of 1980 and 1981. The competing teams were all twelve VFL teams, and three teams each from the SANFL and WAFL, who qualified based on their league finishing positions in 1981.

The format for the competition was a simple knock-out tournament. The twelve VFL clubs and the 1981 premiers from both the SANFL and WAFL qualified directly for the round of sixteen; the remaining four qualifiers from the SANFL and WAFL started from the preceding elimination round. With the exception of the initial elimination round, all matches were played at VFL Park on Tuesday nights. Matches were televised. The tournament was mostly played concurrently with the premiership season, although some early matches were played during the preseason.

=== Qualified Teams ===
Team	Nickname	League	Qualification	Participation (bold indicates winners)^{1}
Enter in Round 1
Carlton	Blues	VFL	Winners of the 1981 Victorian Football League	11th (Previous: 1907, 1908, 1914, **1968**, **1970**, 1972, 1976, 1979, 1980, 1981)
Collingwood	Magpies	VFL	Runners-Up in the 1981 Victorian Football League	6th (Previous: **1896**, 1910, **1979**, 1980, 1981)
Geelong	Cats	VFL	Third Place in the 1981 Victorian Football League	4th (Previous: 1979, 1980, 1981)
Fitzroy	Lions	VFL	Fourth Place in the 1981 Victorian Football League	5th (Previous: 1913, 1979, 1980, 1981)
Essendon	Bombers	VFL	Fifth Place in the 1981 Victorian Football League	6th (Previous: **1893**, 1911, 1979, 1980, **1981**)
Hawthorn	Hawks	VFL	Sixth Place in the 1981 Victorian Football League	6th (Previous: **1971**, **1976**, 1979, 1980, 1981)
Richmond	Tigers	VFL	Seventh Place in the 1981 Victorian Football League	8th (Previous: **1969**, **1973**, **1974**, 1976, 1979, 1980, 1981)
North Melbourne	Kangaroos	VFL	Eighth Place in the 1981 Victorian Football League	6th (Previous: **1975**, 1976, 1979, **1980**, 1981)
South Melbourne	Swans	VFL	Ninth Place in the 1981 Victorian Football League	7th (Previous: 1888, 1890, **1909**, 1979, 1980, 1981)
St Kilda	Saints	VFL	Tenth Place in the 1981 Victorian Football League	4th (Previous: 1979, 1980, 1981)
Footscray	Bulldogs	VFL	Eleventh Place in the 1981 Victorian Football League	5th (Previous: 1976, 1979, 1980, 1981)
Melbourne	Demons	VFL	Twelfth Place in the 1981 Victorian Football League	4th (Previous: 1979, 1980, 1981)
Port Adelaide	Magpies	SANFL	Winners of the 1981 South Australian National Football League	11th (Previous: **1890**, **1910**, **1913**, **1914**, 1976, 1977, 1978, 1979, 1980, 1981)
Claremont	Tigers	WAFL	Winners of the 1981 West Australian Football League	5th (Previous: 1977, 1979, 1980, 1981)
Enter in Qualifying round
Glenelg	Tigers	SANFL	Runners-Up in the 1981 South Australian National Football League	8th (Previous: 1973, 1976, 1977, 1978, 1979, 1980, 1981)
Norwood	Redlegs	SANFL	Third Place in the 1981 South Australian National Football League	10th (Previous: **1888**, **1907**, 1975, 1976, **1977**, 1978, 1979, 1980, 1981)
South Fremantle	Bulldogs	WAFL	Runners-Up in the 1981 West Australian Football League	6th (Previous: 1976, 1977, 1979, 1980, 1981)
Swan Districts	Swans	WAFL	Third Place in the 1981 West Australian Football League	5th (Previous: 1976, 1979, 1980, 1981)

^{1} Includes previous appearances in the Championship of Australia and NFL Night Series.

=== Venues ===
Melbourne	Adelaide	Perth
Waverley Park	Football Park	Subiaco Oval
Capacity: **72,000**	Capacity: **67,000**	Capacity: **53,000**

== Games ==
=== Elimination round ===
Home team	Home team score	Away team	Away team score	Ground	Crowd	Date
Swan Districts	21.14 (140)	Glenelg	15.12 (102)	Subiaco Oval		Saturday, 13 March
Norwood	10.12 (72)	South Fremantle	18.16 (124)	Football Park		Saturday, 13 March

=== Round of sixteen ===
Winning team	Winning team score	Losing team	Losing team score	Ground	Crowd	Date
Fitzroy	12.13 (85)	Geelong	7.8 (50)	VFL Park	10,568	Tuesday, 9 March
Carlton	14.16 (100)	Port Adelaide	5.6 (36)	VFL Park	6,220	Tuesday, 16 March
Melbourne	12.12 (84)	Hawthorn	6.5 (41)	VFL Park	6,859	Tuesday, 23 March
North Melbourne	18.13 (121)	Claremont	11.11 (77)	VFL Park	4,552	Tuesday, 6 April
Swan Districts	13.9 (87)	Collingwood	11.11 (77)	VFL Park	6,504	Tuesday, 20 April
Richmond	10.6 (66)	Essendon	2.6 (18)	VFL Park	6,958	Tuesday, 27 April
St Kilda	16.14 (110)	Footscray	6.11 (47)	VFL Park	4,628	Tuesday, 4 May
South Melbourne^{N 1}	24.16 (160)	South Fremantle	6.9 (45)	VFL Park	4,752	Tuesday, 11 May

=== Quarter-finals ===
Winning team	Winning team score	Losing team	Losing team score	Ground	Crowd	Date
Carlton	12.14 (86)	Fitzroy	12.8 (80)	VFL Park	7,063	Tuesday, 25 May
North Melbourne	11.16 (82)	Melbourne	10.10 (70)	VFL Park	4,228	Tuesday, 1 June
The Swans^{N 1}	8.11 (59)	St Kilda	7.9 (51)	VFL Park	4,761	Tuesday, 8 June
Richmond	33.16 (214)	Swan Districts	4.4 (28)	VFL Park	2,688	Tuesday, 22 June

=== Semi-finals ===
Winning team	Winning team score	Losing team	Losing team score	Ground	Crowd	Date
North Melbourne	13.12 (90)	Carlton	8.13 (61)	VFL Park	5,642	Tuesday, 29 June
The Swans^{N 1}	13.17 (95)	Richmond	6.6 (42)	VFL Park	4,955	Tuesday, 6 July

=== Final ===
Winning team	Winning team score	Losing team	Losing team score	Ground	Crowd	Date
The Swans^{N 1}	13.12 (90)	North Melbourne	8.10 (58)	VFL Park	20,028	Tuesday, 20 July

== Notable events ==
=== Swan Districts controversy ===
The WAFL's Swan Districts Football Club generated controversy when it sent a team of reserves and colts players to contest its quarter-final against Richmond in protest at the rescheduling of the match. The match had already been pushed back from 1 June to 8 June to accommodate an interstate match between South Australia and Victoria on Monday 17 May. Then, after South Melbourne and St Kilda both qualified for the quarter-finals, it happened that those teams would be playing two televised matches against each other inside three days: a league match on Sunday 20 June in Sydney, and then the Escort Cup match on Tuesday 22 June. This was unfavourable for the teams; and in a time when few football matches were broadcast live, it was also unfavourable for the television sponsors. As such, the AFC moved the Swans–St Kilda match to 8 June and the Swan Districts–Richmond match to 22 June.

Swan Districts was unhappy with the way the games were rescheduled. The club was not consulted prior to the AFC announcing the reschedule, and it affected arrangements that the club had already made for a social club function on the night of 8 June. Additionally, the 8 June timing was located between league matches against the WAFL's bottom two teams; but, the 22 June timing was located between league matches against the second- and third-placed teams—and, being placed first at the time, Swan Districts was worried about the effect of a midweek match in Melbourne upon its WAFL premiership aspirations. More generally, Swan Districts coach John Todd was already a vocal critic of the dominance of Victorian influence in the administration of the game at a national level, and he was unhappy at seeing his club treated in a way in which he did not believe a Victorian club would have been treated.

When the reschedule was first announced on 19 May, Swan Districts considered forfeiting the match. On 1 June, the club announced that it had decided that it would send a full-strength team to the match. But, two days before the match, it reneged on this promise, and sent an inexperienced team of reserves and colts players, only two of which had played seniors the previous weekend, and which had a total of 69 senior games' experience across its 21 members. Unsurprisingly, the inexperienced team was completely uncompetitive against Richmond—which was at that time on top of the VFL ladder—and lost the match by 186 points.

The following month, the AFC banned Swan Districts from competing in the Escort Championships until 1985 as punishment for the controversy.

=== Other notable events ===
- Due to a guernsey clash, Collingwood wore a white guernsey with a black yoke instead of its normal white and black stripes in its match against Swan Districts.
- The quarter-final between the Swans and St Kilda was played in a heavy fog. Swans coach Ricky Quade was unable to see the action from the coaches' box, and visibility on the field was reportedly only about six metres. The ground developed frost as the game went on, also affecting handling skills.
- For the first time in Escort Cup history, a championship flag was awarded to the winning team in addition to a trophy.

== See also ==
- List of Australian Football League night premiers
- 1982 VFL season

== Footnotes ==
1. During 1982, the South Melbourne Football Club was in transition as it moved to Sydney to become the Sydney Swans. Although it played all of its premiership season home games in Sydney in 1982, the club was still known as South Melbourne until 2 June, after which it was known as simply the Swans. It formally became the Sydney Swans prior to the 1983 season.
