= 1981 AFC Night Series =

AFC Escort Championships

Tournament details
- Dates: 7 March – 14 July 1981
- Teams: 34
- Venue: 8 (in 6 host cities)

Final positions
- Champions: Essendon (1st title)
- Runners-up: Carlton

Tournament statistics
- Matches played: 35
- Attendance: 223,959 (6,399 per match)

The 1981 Australian Football Championships Night Series was the 3rd edition of the AFC Night Series, a VFL-organised national club Australian rules football tournament between the leading clubs from the VFL, the SANFL, the WAFL and State Representative Teams.

A total of 34 teams from across Australia played 35 matches over five months, with the qualifying rounds held during the pre-season and the main draw held midweek throughout the premiership season.

== Qualified Teams ==
Team	Nickname	League	Qualification	Participation (bold indicates winners)^{1}
Enter in Round 3
Richmond	Tigers	VFL	Winners of the 1980 Victorian Football League	7th (Previous: **1969**, **1973**, **1974**, 1976, 1979, 1980)
Collingwood	Magpies	VFL	Runners-Up in the 1980 Victorian Football League	5th (Previous: **1896**, 1910, **1979**, 1980)
Geelong	Cats	VFL	Third Place in the 1980 Victorian Football League	3rd (Previous: 1979, 1980)
Carlton	Blues	VFL	Fourth Place in the 1980 Victorian Football League	10th (Previous: 1907, 1908, 1914, **1968**, **1970**, 1972, 1976, 1979, 1980)
North Melbourne	Kangaroos	VFL	Fifth Place in the 1980 Victorian Football League	5th (Previous: **1975**, 1976, 1979, **1980**)
South Melbourne	Swans	VFL	Sixth Place in the 1980 Victorian Football League	6th (Previous: 1888, 1890, **1909**, 1979, 1980)
Enter in Round 1
Essendon	Bombers	VFL	Seventh Place in the 1980 Victorian Football League	5th (Previous: **1893**, 1911, 1979, 1980)
Hawthorn	Hawks	VFL	Eighth Place in the 1980 Victorian Football League	5th (Previous: **1971**, **1976**, 1979, 1980)
Melbourne	Demons	VFL	Ninth Place in the 1980 Victorian Football League	3rd (Previous: 1979, 1980)
Footscray	Bulldogs	VFL	Tenth Place in the 1980 Victorian Football League	4th (Previous: 1976, 1979, 1980)
St Kilda	Saints	VFL	Eleventh Place in the 1980 Victorian Football League	3rd (Previous: 1979, 1980)
Fitzroy	Lions	VFL	Twelfth Place in the 1980 Victorian Football League	4th (Previous: 1913, 1979, 1980)
Port Adelaide	Magpies	SANFL	Winners of the 1980 South Australian National Football League	10th (Previous: **1890**, **1910**, **1913**, **1914**, 1976, 1977, 1978, 1979, 1980)
Norwood	Redlegs	SANFL	Runners-Up in the 1980 South Australian National Football League	9th (Previous: **1888**, **1907**, 1975, 1976, **1977**, 1978, 1979, 1980)
Sturt	Double Blues	SANFL	Third Place in the 1980 South Australian National Football League	9th (Previous: 1968, 1969, 1970, 1974, 1976, 1977, 1979, 1980)
Glenelg	Tigers	SANFL	Fourth Place in the 1980 South Australian National Football League	7th (Previous: 1973, 1976, 1977, 1978, 1979, 1980)
West Torrens	Eagles	SANFL	Fifth Place in the 1980 South Australian National Football League	3rd (Previous: 1979, 1980)
Central District	Bulldogs	SANFL	Sixth Place in the 1980 South Australian National Football League	4th (Previous: 1977, 1979, 1980)
South Adelaide	Panthers	SANFL	Seventh Place in the 1980 South Australian National Football League	7th (Previous: 1893, 1896, 1977, **1978**, **1979**, 1980)
North Adelaide	Roosters	SANFL	Eighth Place in the 1980 South Australian National Football League	6th (Previous: 1971, **1972**, 1977, 1979, 1980)
West Adelaide	Bloods	SANFL	Ninth Place in the 1980 South Australian National Football League	8th (Previous: **1908**, 1909, **1911**, 1977, 1978, 1979, 1980)
Woodville	Woodpeckers	SANFL	Tenth Place in the 1980 South Australian National Football League	3rd (Previous: 1979, 1980)
South Fremantle	Bulldogs	WAFL	Winners of the 1980 West Australian Football League	5th (Previous: 1976, 1977, 1979, 1980)
Swan Districts	Swans	WAFL	Runners-Up in the 1980 West Australian Football League	4th (Previous: 1976, 1979, 1980)
East Perth	Royals	WAFL	Third Place in the 1980 West Australian Football League	6th (Previous: 1972, 1977, 1978, 1979, 1980)
Claremont	Tigers	WAFL	Fourth Place in the 1980 West Australian Football League	4th (Previous: 1977, 1979, 1980)
West Perth	Falcons	WAFL	Fifth Place in the 1980 West Australian Football League	7th (Previous: 1975, 1976, 1977, 1978, 1979, 1980)
Perth	Demons	WAFL	Sixth Place in the 1980 West Australian Football League	5th (Previous: 1977, 1978, 1979, 1980)
East Fremantle	Sharks	WAFL	Seventh Place in the 1980 West Australian Football League	6th (Previous: 1974, 1977, 1978, 1979, 1980)
Subiaco	Lions	WAFL	Eighth Place in the 1980 West Australian Football League	4th (Previous: 1973, 1979, 1980)
Australian Capital Territory	Rams	ACTAFL	State Representative Team	5th (Previous: 1977, 1978, 1979, 1980)
New South Wales	Blues	NSWAFL	State Representative Team	5th (Previous: 1977, 1978, 1979, 1980)
Queensland	Maroons	QAFL	State Representative Team	4th (Previous: 1977, 1978, 1980)
Tasmania	Devils	TANFL	State Representative Team	6th (Previous: 1974, 1977, 1978, 1979, 1980)

^{1} Includes previous appearances in the Championship of Australia and NFL Night Series.

== Venues ==
Melbourne	Adelaide	Perth			Brisbane	Canberra	Hobart
Waverley Park	Norwood Oval	Subiaco Oval	Claremont Oval	Leederville Oval	Chelmer Oval	Phillip Oval	North Hobart Oval
Capacity: 72,000	Capacity: 22,000	Capacity: 53,000	Capacity: 15,000	Capacity: 22,000	Capacity: 10,000	Capacity: 15,000	Capacity: 26,000

== Knockout stage ==
=== Round 1 ===
7 March 1981	Subiaco	107–86	South Fremantle	Claremont Oval, Perth
	16.11 (107)		12.14 (86)	Attendance: 3,500 (estimate)

7 March 1981	West Perth	88–87	Claremont	Subiaco Oval, Perth
	13.10 (88)		12.15 (87)	Attendance: 5,000 (estimate)

7 March 1981	Essendon	94–52	Fitzroy	Waverley Park, Melbourne
	13.16 (94)		7.10 (52)	Attendance: 24,255

8 March 1981	East Fremantle	141–70	Swan Districts	Subiaco Oval, Perth
	21.15 (141)		9.16 (70)	Attendance: 6,000 (estimate)

8 March 1981	East Perth	127–102	Perth	Leederville Oval, Perth
	19.13 (127)		16.6 (102)	Attendance: 4,500 (estimate)

9 March 1981	Central District	102–68	West Torrens	Norwood Oval, Adelaide
	14.18 (102)		9.14 (68)	Attendance: 4,000 (estimate)

9 March 1981	Port Adelaide	101–72	Woodville	Norwood Oval, Adelaide
	14.17 (101)		10.12 (72)	Attendance: 4,000 (estimate)

10 March 1981	Norwood	80–102	West Adelaide	Norwood Oval, Adelaide
	12.8 (80)		15.12 (102)	Attendance: 5,000 (estimate)

10 March 1981	North Adelaide	106–75	Sturt	Norwood Oval, Adelaide
	15.16 (106)		10.15 (75)	Attendance: 5,000 (estimate)

13 March 1981	South Adelaide	88–57	Glenelg	Norwood Oval, Adelaide
	13.10 (88)		6.17 (53)	Attendance: 3,500 (estimate)

13 March 1981	Melbourne	41–31	Footscray	Waverley Park, Melbourne
	6.5 (41)		4.7 (31)	Attendance: 3,627

14 March 1981	Hawthorn	101–48	St Kilda	Waverley Park, Melbourne
	15.11 (101)		7.6 (48)	Attendance: 8,100

11 April 1981	Queensland	80–96	Tasmania	Chelmer Oval, Brisbane
	12.8 (80)		13.18 (96)	Attendance: 2,500 (estimate)

12 April 1981	Australian Capital Territory	108–51	New South Wales	Phillip Oval, Canberra
	14.24 (108)		7.9 (51)	Attendance: 2,000 (estimate)

=== Round 2 ===
14 March 1981	West Perth	130–86	East Fremantle	Subiaco Oval, Perth
	18.22 (130)		12.14 (86)	Attendance: 5,500 (estimate)

14 March 1981	East Perth	125–93	Subiaco	Subiaco Oval, Perth
	18.17 (125)		13.15 (93)	Attendance: 5,500 (estimate)

17 March 1981	West Adelaide	129–92	Central District	Norwood Oval, Adelaide
	19.15 (129)		14.8 (92)	Attendance: 4,000 (estimate)

17 March 1981	Port Adelaide	90–66	North Adelaide	Norwood Oval, Adelaide
	13.12 (90)		8.18 (66)	Attendance: 4,000 (estimate)

26 April 1981	Tasmania	86–106	Australian Capital Territory	North Hobart Oval, Hobart
	11.20 (86)		17.4 (106)	Attendance: 8,497

=== Round 2 Playoff ===
5 May 1981	Footscray	99–73	Australian Capital Territory	Waverley Park, Melbourne
	14.15 (99)		11.7 (73)	Attendance: 3,889

=== Round 3 ===
20 March 1981	Geelong	75–31	South Adelaide	Waverley Park, Melbourne
	10.15 (75)		4.7 (31)	Attendance: 3,029

21 March 1981	Richmond	86–52	Melbourne	Waverley Park, Melbourne
	13.8 (86)		7.10 (52)	Attendance: 12,951

24 March 1981	North Melbourne	133–55	West Perth	Waverley Park, Melbourne
	20.13 (133)		8.7 (55)	Attendance: 2,327

31 March 1981	South Melbourne	115–54	West Adelaide	Waverley Park, Melbourne
	16.19 (115)		8.6 (54)	Attendance: 1,521

7 April 1981	Essendon	107–58	Port Adelaide	Waverley Park, Melbourne
	15.17 (107)		8.10 (58)	Attendance: 5,360

14 April 1981	Collingwood	138–40	East Perth	Waverley Park, Melbourne
	20.13 (138)		4.16 (40)	Attendance: 7,136

5 May 1981	Hawthorn	112–34	East Fremantle	Waverley Park, Melbourne
	15.22 (112)		5.4 (34)	Attendance: 3,889

19 May 1981	Carlton	67–60	Footscray	Waverley Park, Melbourne
	10.7 (67)		8.12 (60)	Attendance: 6,934

=== Quarter-finals ===
QF #1 12 May 1981	South Melbourne	55–42	Geelong	Waverley Park, Melbourne
	8.7 (55)		5.12 (42)	Attendance: 7,066

QF #2 2 June 1981	Essendon	93–75	Hawthorn	Waverley Park, Melbourne
	14.9 (93)		10.15 (75)	Attendance: 7,775

QF #3 9 June 1981	Carlton	70–61	Richmond	Waverley Park, Melbourne
	10.10 (70)		8.13 (61)	Attendance: 6,394

QF #4 16 June 1981	North Melbourne	81–59	Collingwood	Waverley Park, Melbourne
	11.15 (81)		9.5 (59)	Attendance: 11,992

=== Semi-finals ===
SF #1 23 June 1981	Essendon	88–33	South Melbourne	Waverley Park, Melbourne
	13.10 (88)		4.9 (33)	Attendance: 5,676

SF #2 30 June 1981	Carlton	72–30	North Melbourne	Waverley Park, Melbourne
	9.18 (72)		4.6 (30)	Attendance: 9,661

=== Australian Football Championships Night Series final ===
Final 14 July 1981	Essendon	65–41	Carlton	Waverley Park, Melbourne
	0.1 (1); 1.2 (8); 4.10 (34); 9.11 (65)		2.0 (12); 4.0 (24); 5.3 (33); 6.5 (41)	Attendance: 42,269; Umpires: Cameron, Robinson
		Goals
	N.Daniher, Fowler, Watson 2 Foreman, Merrett, S. Madden 1		McConville 2 Wells, Bosustow, Johnston, Marcou 1
