= 1980 Escort Championships =

1980 AFC Night Series
AFC Escort Championships

Tournament details
- Dates: 2 March – 15 July 1980
- Teams: 34
- Venue: 10 (in 7 host cities)

Final positions
- Champions: North Melbourne (1st title)
- Runners-up: Collingwood

Tournament statistics
- Matches played: 33
- Attendance: 223,562 (6,775 per match)

The 1980 Escort Championships was an Australian rules football knock-out tournament held between March and July 1980. The tournament was organised by Australian Football Championships, and was contested by teams from the Victorian Football League, South Australian National Football League and West Australian Football League, and the representative teams from New South Wales, Tasmania, Queensland and the Australian Capital Territory. The tournament was won by North Melbourne, who defeated Collingwood in the grand final under controversial circumstances.

== Background ==
The 1980 Escort Championships was the fourth season of the national night premiership competition. The 34 competing teams were all VFL, SANFL and WAFL teams, and the representative teams from New South Wales, Tasmania, Queensland and the Australian Capital Territory.

The format for the competition was a simple knock-out tournament. Round one featured the VFL teams that finished 7th to 12th in 1979; the SANFL teams that finished 3rd to 10th in 1979; the WAFL teams that finished 3rd to 8th in 1979; plus a playoff between the four minor states.

Round two involved the teams that survived round one.

In round three, the winners of round two were joined by the VFL's top six of 1979, the SANFL's top two of 1979, and the WAFL's top two of 1979.

Matches in Rounds 1 and 2 were played in various venues across Australia. With the exception of one Round 3 match, all matches from Round 3 onwards were played at VFL Park on Tuesday nights. Matches were televised directly to Melbourne, Adelaide and Perth. The tournament was mostly played concurrently with the premiership season, although some matches in the first three rounds were played during the pre-season.

=== Qualified teams ===
Team	Nickname	League	Qualification	Participation (bold indicates winners)^{1}
Enter in Round 3
Carlton	Blues	VFL	Winners of the 1979 Victorian Football League	9th (Previous: 1907, 1908, 1914, **1968**, **1970**, 1972, 1976, 1979)
Collingwood	Magpies	VFL	Runners-up in the 1979 Victorian Football League	4th (Previous: **1896**, 1910, **1979**)
North Melbourne	Kangaroos	VFL	Third Place in the 1979 Victorian Football League	4th (Previous: **1975**, 1976, 1979)
Fitzroy	Lions	VFL	Fourth Place in the 1979 Victorian Football League	3rd (Previous: 1913, 1979)
Essendon	Bombers	VFL	Fifth Place in the 1979 Victorian Football League	4th (Previous: **1893**, 1911, 1979)
Geelong	Cats	VFL	Sixth Place in the 1979 Victorian Football League	2nd (Previous: 1979)
Port Adelaide	Magpies	SANFL	Winners of the 1979 South Australian National Football League	9th (Previous: **1890**, **1910**, **1913**, **1914**, 1976, 1977, 1978, 1979)
South Adelaide	Panthers	SANFL	Runners-up in the 1979 South Australian National Football League	6th (Previous: 1893, 1896, 1977, **1978**, **1979**)
East Fremantle	Sharks	WAFL	Winners of the 1979 West Australian Football League	5th (Previous: 1974, 1977, 1978, 1979)
South Fremantle	Bulldogs	WAFL	Runners-up in the 1979 West Australian Football League	4th (Previous: 1976, 1977, 1979)
Enter in Round 1
Hawthorn	Hawks	VFL	Seventh Place in the 1979 Victorian Football League	4th (Previous: **1971**, **1976**, 1979)
Richmond	Tigers	VFL	Eighth Place in the 1979 Victorian Football League	6th (Previous: **1969**, **1973**, **1974**, 1976, 1979)
Footscray	Bulldogs	VFL	Ninth Place in the 1979 Victorian Football League	3rd (Previous: 1976, 1979)
South Melbourne	Swans	VFL	Tenth Place in the 1979 Victorian Football League	5th (Previous: 1888, 1890, **1909**, 1979)
Melbourne	Demons	VFL	Eleventh Place in the 1979 Victorian Football League	2nd (Previous: 1979)
St Kilda	Saints	VFL	Twelfth Place in the 1979 Victorian Football League	2nd (Previous: 1979)
Central District	Bulldogs	SANFL	Third Place in the 1979 South Australian National Football League	3rd (Previous: 1977, 1979)
Norwood	Redlegs	SANFL	Fourth Place in the 1979 South Australian National Football League	8th (Previous: **1888**, **1907**, 1975, 1976, **1977**, 1978, 1979)
Woodville	Woodpeckers	SANFL	Fifth Place in the 1979 South Australian National Football League	2nd (Previous: 1979)
North Adelaide	Roosters	SANFL	Sixth Place in the 1979 South Australian National Football League	5th (Previous: 1971, **1972**, 1977, 1979)
Glenelg	Tigers	SANFL	Seventh Place in the 1979 South Australian National Football League	6th (Previous: 1973, 1976, 1977, 1978, 1979)
West Torrens	Eagles	SANFL	Eighth Place in the 1979 South Australian National Football League	2nd (Previous: 1979)
Sturt	Double Blues	SANFL	Ninth Place in the 1979 South Australian National Football League	8th (Previous: 1968, 1969, 1970, 1974, 1976, 1977, 1979)
West Adelaide	Bloods	SANFL	Tenth Place in the 1979 South Australian National Football League	7th (Previous: **1908**, 1909, **1911**, 1977, 1978, 1979)
Claremont	Tigers	WAFL	Third Place in the 1979 West Australian Football League	3rd (Previous: 1977, 1979)
East Perth	Royals	WAFL	Fourth Place in the 1979 West Australian Football League	4th (Previous: 1972, 1977, 1978, 1979)
Swan Districts	Swans	WAFL	Fifth Place in the 1979 West Australian Football League	3rd (Previous: 1976, 1979)
Perth	Demons	WAFL	Sixth Place in the 1979 West Australian Football League	4th (Previous: 1977, 1978, 1979)
West Perth	Falcons	WAFL	Seventh Place in the 1979 West Australian Football League	6th (Previous: 1975, 1976, 1977, 1978, 1979)
Subiaco	Lions	WAFL	Eighth Place in the 1979 West Australian Football League	3rd (Previous: 1973, 1979)
Australian Capital Territory	Rams	ACTAFL	State Representative Team	4th (Previous: 1977, 1978, 1979)
New South Wales	Blues	NSWAFL	State Representative Team	4th (Previous: 1977, 1978, 1979)
Queensland	Maroons	QAFL	State Representative Team	3rd (Previous: 1977, 1978)
Tasmania	Devils	TANFL	State Representative Team	5th (Previous: 1974, 1977, 1978, 1979)

^{1} Includes previous appearances in the Championship of Australia and NFL Night Series.

=== Venues ===
Melbourne	Adelaide		Perth		
Waverley Park	Norwood Oval	Richmond Oval	Perth Oval	East Fremantle Oval	Leederville Oval
Capacity: **72,000**	Capacity: **22,000**	Capacity: **16,500**	Capacity: **27,000**	Capacity: **22,000**	Capacity: **25,000**

Sydney	Wagga Wagga	Ulverstone	Brisbane
Sydney Cricket Ground	McPherson Oval	Ulverstone Recreation Ground	Windsor Park
Capacity: **45,000**	Capacity: **10,000**	Capacity: **15,000**	Capacity: **10,000**

== Games ==
=== Round 1 ===
Home team	Home team score	Away team	Away team score	Ground	Crowd	Date
West Perth	11.15 (81)	Hawthorn	18.13 (121)	Perth Oval		Sunday, 2 March
Claremont	22.10 (142)	East Perth	4.16 (40)	Leederville Oval, Perth		Monday, 3 March
Subiaco	15.9 (99)	Perth	11.14 (80)	Perth Oval		Monday, 3 March
Melbourne	22.16 (148)	Swan Districts	8.18 (66)	VFL Park	3,040	Tuesday, 4 March
St Kilda	19.6 (120)	Sturt	8.11 (59)	VFL Park	6,436	Saturday, 8 March
South Melbourne	10.16 (76)	West Adelaide	7.18 (60)	Richmond Oval, Adelaide		Saturday, 8 March
West Torrens	12.3 (75)	Footscray	17.10 (112)	VFL Park	2,108	Tuesday, 11 March
North Adelaide	14.11 (95)	Norwood	13.13 (91)	Norwood Oval		Tuesday, 11 March
Glenelg	11.13 (79)	Central District	6.8 (44)	Norwood Oval		Friday, 14 March
Richmond	20.17 (137)	Woodville	9.3 (57)	VFL Park	5,031	Saturday, 15 March
Tasmania	9.15 (69)	Queensland	15.17 (107)	Ulverstone, Tasmania	2,174	Sunday, 16 March
New South Wales	17.10 (112)	Australian Capital Territory	10.11 (71)	McPherson Oval, North Wagga Wagga	3,500	Sunday, 16 March

=== Round 2 ===
Home team	Home team score	Away team	Away team score	Ground	Crowd	Date
Claremont	16.20 (116)	Subiaco	12.9 (81)	Leederville Oval, Perth		Saturday, 15 March
Hawthorn	17.17 (119)	Melbourne	14.4 (88)	VFL Park	6,005	Tuesday, 18 March
North Adelaide	13.12 (90)	Glenelg	22.11 (143)	Norwood Oval		Friday, 21 March
St Kilda	17.15 (117)	South Melbourne	10.6 (66)	VFL Park	10,308	Saturday, 22 March
Footscray	18.14 (122)	Queensland	10.8 (68)	Windsor Park, Mayne		Sunday, 23 March
Richmond	17.19 (121)	New South Wales	14.16 (100)	Sydney Cricket Ground		Sunday, 23 March

=== Round 3 ===
Home team	Home team score	Away team	Away team score	Ground	Crowd	Date
Port Adelaide	12.14 (86)	Essendon	18.10 (118)	VFL Park	5,261	Friday, 14 March
South Fremantle	23.19 (157)	Carlton	9.12 (66)	East Fremantle Oval, Perth	6,000	Sunday, 16 March
Claremont	10.13 (73)	Geelong	9.14 (68)	VFL Park	3,783	Tuesday, 25 March
Hawthorn	20.20 (140)	East Fremantle	4.11 (35)	VFL Park	2,919	Tuesday, 1 April
Glenelg	9.11 (65)	North Melbourne	9.16 (70)	VFL Park	4,419	Tuesday, 15 April
St Kilda	16.11 (107)	South Adelaide	13.11 (89)	VFL Park	3,594	Tuesday, 29 April
Footscray	11.9 (75)	Collingwood	18.13 (121)	VFL Park	9,995	Tuesday, 6 May
Richmond	16.13 (109)	Fitzroy	13.12 (90)	VFL Park	10,626	Tuesday, 13 May

=== Quarter-finals ===
Home team	Home team score	Away team	Away team score	Ground	Crowd	Date
Claremont	12.12 (84)	Hawthorn	7.10 (52)	VFL Park	5,326	Tuesday, 20 May
North Melbourne	18.11 (119)	St Kilda	13.11 (89)	VFL Park	6,223	Tuesday, 27 May
Collingwood	10.14 (74)	Richmond	5.13 (43)	VFL Park	17,950	Tuesday, 3 June
Essendon	12.14 (86)	South Fremantle	6.11 (47)	VFL Park	4,060	Tuesday, 10 June

=== Semi-finals ===
Home team	Home team score	Away team	Away team score	Ground	Crowd	Date
North Melbourne	15.10 (100)	Claremont	9.9 (63)	VFL Park	4,299	Tuesday, 24 June
Collingwood	15.10 (100)	Essendon	12.9 (81)	VFL Park	16,527	Tuesday, 1 July

=== Grand final ===
Home team	Home team score	Away team	Away team score	Ground	Crowd	Date
North Melbourne	8.9 (57)	Collingwood	7.12 (54)	VFL Park	50,478	Tuesday, 15 July

== Notable events ==
- The competition sponsor at the time was the cigarette manufacturer W.D. & H.O. Wills – "Escort" was a brand name used by the company at the time.
- The total prizemoney was $400,000, with the winners North Melbourne winning $64,000.
- The grand final ended in controversy. Collingwood led by three points when the final siren sounded, but field umpire Ian Robinson was unable to hear it, and allowed play to continue for several seconds; indeed, many players were unable to hear the siren, although many could and some Collingwood players were already celebrating the victory. In the ensuing play, North Melbourne's Malcolm Blight passed the ball forward to Kerry Good, who marked and then kicked a goal after the final siren to secure victory for North Melbourne. To minimize the risk of a repeated incident, VFL umpires wore portable electronic beepers during the finals of the premiership season.

== See also ==
- List of Australian Football League night premiers
- 1980 VFL season
- Sirengate
