= 1979 NFL Championship Series (Australia) =

NFL Escort Cup

Tournament details
- Dates: 25 April – 10 July 1979
- Teams: 14
- Venue: 3 (in 3 host cities)

Final positions
- Champions: South Adelaide (2nd title)
- Runners-up: Norwood

Tournament statistics
- Matches played: 13
- Attendance: 46,492 (3,576 per match)

The 1979 NFL Championship Series was the 4th edition of the NFL Night Series, an NFL-organised national club Australian rules football tournament between the leading clubs from the SANFL, the VFA and QAFL.

In June 1978 the VFL announced their plans to form a new company to oversee a night series that would be broadcast nationally and Australian Football Championships Pty. Ltd. was incorporated on 28 July 1978 to run a rival national night competition, in opposition to the NFL Night Series. By October 1978, The VFL were joined by the WAFL, TANFL, NSWAFL and ACTAFL in the joint venture and transferred from NFL Night Series to the AFC Night Series. However, the SANFL rejected the VFL's overtures, choosing to remain aligned with the NFL instead. They were joined by the VFA and QAFL in a greatly-reduced NFL Series.

However, by May 1979, the NFL, the SANFL and the AFC/VFL held meetings to discuss the future of the series and agree that the SANFL would join the AFC Night Series in 1980 and that the NFL would ceased running their Night Series beyond this edition.

== Qualified Teams ==
Team	Nickname	League	Qualification	Participation (bold indicates winners)^{1}
Norwood	Redlegs	SANFL	Winners of the 1978 South Australian National Football League	7th (Previous: **1888**, **1907**, 1975, 1976, **1977**, 1978)
Sturt	Double Blues	SANFL	Runners-Up of the 1978 South Australian National Football League	7th (Previous: 1968, 1969, 1970, 1974, 1976, 1977)
Port Adelaide	Magpies	SANFL	Third Place in the 1978 South Australian National Football League	8th (Previous: **1890**, **1910**, **1913**, **1914**, 1976, 1977, 1978)
Glenelg	Tigers	SANFL	Fourth Place in the 1978 South Australian National Football League	5th (Previous: 1973, 1976, 1977, 1978)
West Torrens	Eagles	SANFL	Fifth Place in the 1978 South Australian National Football League	1st
Woodville	Woodpeckers	SANFL	Sixth Place in the 1978 South Australian National Football League	1st
South Adelaide	Panthers	SANFL	Seventh Place in the 1978 South Australian National Football League	5th (Previous: 1893, 1896, 1977, **1978**)
Central District	Bulldogs	SANFL	Eighth Place in the 1978 South Australian National Football League	2nd (Previous: 1977)
West Adelaide	Bloods	SANFL	Ninth Place in the 1978 South Australian National Football League	6th (Previous: **1908**, 1909, **1911**, 1977, 1978)
North Adelaide	Roosters	SANFL	Tenth Place in the 1978 South Australian National Football League	4th (Previous: 1971, **1972**, 1977)
Prahran	Two Blues	VFA	Winners of the 1978 Victorian Football Association Premiership	1st
Preston	Bullants	VFA	Runners-Up in the 1978 Victorian Football Association Premiership	2nd (Previous: 1977)
Western Districts	Bulldogs	QAFL	Winners of the 1978 Queensland Australian Football League	1st
Windsor-Zillmere	Eagles	QAFL	Runners-Up in the 1978 Queensland Australian Football League	1st

^{1} Includes previous appearances in the Championship of Australia.

== Venues ==
Adelaide	Melbourne	Brisbane
Norwood Oval	Preston City Oval	Brisbane Cricket Ground
Capacity: 22,000	Capacity: 15,000	Capacity: 35,000

== Knockout stage ==
=== Round 1 ===
25 April 1979	Prahran	44-89	Port Adelaide	Preston City Oval, Melbourne
	6.8 (44)		13.11 (89)	Attendance: 6,000

25 April 1979	Preston	76-108	Central District	Preston City Oval, Melbourne
	11.10 (76)		16.12 (108)	Attendance: 6,000

25 April 1979	Windsor-Zillmere	79-133	West Torrens	Brisbane Cricket Ground, Brisbane
	12.7 (79)		20.13 (133)	Attendance: 4,000

25 April 1979	Western Districts	62-125	South Adelaide	Brisbane Cricket Ground, Brisbane
	9.8 (62)		17.23 (125)	Attendance: 4,000

8 May 1979	Sturt	114-83	North Adelaide	Norwood Oval, Adelaide
	16.18 (114)		12.11 (83)	Attendance: 5,332

8 May 1979	Norwood	94-77	West Adelaide	Norwood Oval, Adelaide
	13.16 (94)		11.11 (77)	Attendance: 5,332

=== Quarter-finals ===
QF #1 15 May 1979	West Torrens	125-78	Woodville	Norwood Oval, Adelaide
	18.17 (125)		11.12 (78)	Attendance: 1,935

QF #2 22 May 1979	South Adelaide	83-70	Sturt	Norwood Oval, Adelaide
	12.11 (83)		10.10 (70)	Attendance: 1,500

QF #3 29 May 1979	Glenelg	101-83	Central District	Norwood Oval, Adelaide
	15.11 (101)		12.11 (83)	Attendance: 2,027

QF #4 5 June 1979	Norwood	71-56	Port Adelaide	Norwood Oval, Adelaide
	10.11 (71)		8.8 (56)	Attendance: 5,739

=== Semi-finals ===
SF #1 12 June 1979	South Adelaide	78-61	West Torrens	Norwood Oval, Adelaide
	12.6 (78)		9.7 (61)	Attendance: 2,676

SF #2 26 June 1979	Norwood	65-38	Glenelg	Norwood Oval, Adelaide
	9.11 (65)		5.8 (38)	Attendance: 4,767

=== NFL Championship Series final ===
Final 10 July 1979	Norwood	40-51	South Adelaide	Norwood Oval, Adelaide
	1.4 (10); 4.5 (29); 5.8 (38); 5.10 (40)		2.3 (15); 5.5 (35); 5.7 (37); 7.9 (51)	Attendance: 12,516; Umpires: Peter Mead
		Goals
	Rosser, Craig, Armour, Gallagher, Adamson 1		G Brooksby, Linke 2 Schneebichler, Cox, Baynes 1
