= 1977 NFL Championship Series (Australia) =

NFL Ardath Cup

Tournament details
- Dates: 20 March – 26 July 1977
- Teams: 22
- Venue: 5 (in 3 host cities)

Final positions
- Champions: Norwood (3rd title)
- Runners-up: East Perth

Tournament statistics
- Matches played: 21
- Attendance: 64,818 (3,087 per match)

The 1977 NFL Championship Series was the 2nd edition of the NFL Night Series, an NFL-organised national club Australian rules football tournament between the leading clubs from the SANFL, the WANFL, the VFA and State Representative Teams.

Following the success of the 1976 competition, the 1977 edition was originally planned to be a full-scale national competition that would feature all the VFL, SANFL and WANFL teams plus representative teams from Tasmania, Queensland, New South Wales and the ACT. But in late 1976, the VFL announced they were withdrawing from the national competition to form their own rival night series, the VFL Night Series.

Following this decision, the NFL decided to replace the VFL teams with the top four VFA teams from the previous season, a surprising move considering the VFA was expelled from the ANFC in 1970.

== Qualified Teams ==
Team	Nickname	League	Qualification	Participation (bold indicates winners)^{1}
Enter in Round 2
Sturt	Double Blues	SANFL	Winners of the 1976 South Australian National Football League	6th (Previous: 1968, 1969, 1970, 1974, 1976)
Port Adelaide	Magpies	SANFL	Runners-Up in the 1976 South Australian National Football League	6th (Previous: **1890**, **1910**, **1913**, **1914**, 1976)
Glenelg	Tigers	SANFL	Third Place in the 1976 South Australian National Football League	3rd (Previous: 1973, 1976)
Norwood	Redlegs	SANFL	Fourth Place in the 1976 South Australian National Football League	5th (Previous: **1888**, **1907**, 1975, 1976)
Perth	Demons	WANFL	Winners of the 1976 Western Australian National Football League	1st
East Perth	Royals	WANFL	Runners-Up in the 1976 Western Australian National Football League	2nd (Previous: 1972)
South Fremantle	Bulldogs	WANFL	Third Place in the 1976 Western Australian National Football League	2nd (Previous: 1976)
Port Melbourne	Boroughs	VFA	Winners of the 1976 Victorian Football Association Premiership	1st
Queensland	Maroons	QAFL	State Representative Team	1st
Tasmania	Devils	TANFL	State Representative Team	2nd (Previous: 1974)
Enter in Round 1
West Adelaide	Bloods	SANFL	Fifth Place in the 1976 South Australian National Football League	4th (Previous: **1908**, 1909, **1911**)
Central District	Bulldogs	SANFL	Sixth Place in the 1976 South Australian National Football League	1st
South Adelaide	Panthers	SANFL	Seventh Place in the 1976 South Australian National Football League	3rd (Previous: 1893, 1896)
North Adelaide	Roosters	SANFL	Eighth Place in the 1976 South Australian National Football League	3rd (Previous: 1971, **1972**)
West Perth	Falcons	WANFL	Fourth Place in the 1976 Western Australian National Football League	3rd (Previous: 1975, 1976)
East Fremantle	Sharks	WANFL	Fifth Place in the 1976 Western Australian National Football League	2nd (Previous: 1974)
Claremont	Tigers	WANFL	Sixth Place in the 1976 Western Australian National Football League	1st
Dandenong	Redlegs	VFA	Runners-Up in the 1976 Victorian Football Association Premiership	1st
Preston	Bullants	VFA	Third Place in the 1976 Victorian Football Association Premiership	1st
Caulfield	Bears	VFA	Fourth Place in the 1976 Victorian Football Association Premiership	1st
Australian Capital Territory	Rams	ACTAFL	State Representative Team	1st
New South Wales	Blues	NSWAFL	State Representative Team	1st

^{1} Includes previous appearances in the Championship of Australia.

== Venues ==
Adelaide	Perth			Melbourne
Norwood Oval	Leederville Oval	Lathlain Park	Claremont Oval	Lake Oval
Capacity: 22,000	Capacity: 25,000	Capacity: 20,000	Capacity: 15,000	Capacity: 20,000

== Knockout stage ==
=== Round 1 ===
20 March 1977	Claremont	85-53	South Adelaide	Claremont Oval, Perth
	13.7 (85)		8.5 (53)	Attendance: 5,195

27 March 1977	Dandenong	92-83	Central District	Lake Oval, Melbourne
	14.8 (92)		11.17 (83)	Attendance: 2,500

5 April 1977	West Perth	116-65	North Adelaide	Leederville Oval, Perth
	16.20 (116)		9.11 (65)	Attendance: 2,000 (estimate)

5 April 1977	Preston	100-73	New South Wales	Norwood Oval, Adelaide
	15.10 (100)		11.7 (73)	Attendance: 500 (estimate)

12 April 1977	West Adelaide	63-93	East Fremantle	Norwood Oval, Adelaide
	9.9 (63)		14.9 (93)	Attendance: 1,500

19 April 1977	Caulfield	76-95	Australian Capital Territory	Norwood Oval, Adelaide
	11.10 (76)		14.11 (95)	Attendance: 250

=== Round 2 ===
26 April 1977	South Fremantle	92-89	Tasmania	Norwood Oval, Adelaide
	13.14 (92)		13.11 (89)	Attendance: 1,000 (estimate)

3 May 1977	Sturt	131-45	Claremont	Norwood Oval, Adelaide
	18.23 (131)		7.3 (45)	Attendance: 3,073

10 May 1977	Norwood	125-59	Australian Capital Territory	Norwood Oval, Adelaide
	18.17 (125)		8.11 (59)	Attendance: 2,000

17 May 1977	Port Melbourne	111-80	Queensland	Norwood Oval, Adelaide
	17.9 (111)		12.8 (80)	Attendance: 500

24 May 1977	East Fremantle	125-56	Preston	Norwood Oval, Adelaide
	18.17 (125)		7.14 (56)	Attendance: 600 (estimate)

31 May 1977	Perth	140-87	Glenelg	Lathlain Park, Perth
	21.14 (140)		13.9 (87)	Attendance: 5,000

31 May 1977	Port Adelaide	168-27	West Perth	Norwood Oval, Adelaide
	25.18 (168)		4.3 (27)	Attendance: 3,000 (estimate)

7 June 1977	East Perth	54-43	Dandenong	Norwood Oval, Adelaide
	7.12 (54)		6.7 (43)	Attendance: 1,500 (estimate)

=== Quarter-finals ===
QF #1 14 June 1977	Sturt	125-68	South Fremantle	Norwood Oval, Adelaide
	19.11(125)		9.14 (68)	Attendance: 3,000

QF #2 21 June 1977	Norwood	152-82	Port Melbourne	Norwood Oval, Adelaide
	23.14 (152)		12.10 (82)	Attendance: 2,500

QF #3 28 June 1977	East Fremantle	98-73	Perth	Leederville Oval, Perth
	14.14 (98)		11.7 (73)	Attendance: 3,500

QF #4 5 July 1977	Port Adelaide	84-86	East Perth	Norwood Oval, Adelaide
	13.6 (84)		13.8 (86)	Attendance: 3,000 (estimate)

=== Semi-finals ===
SF #1 12 July 1977	Norwood	113-57	Sturt	Norwood Oval, Adelaide
	17.11 (113)		8.9 (57)	Attendance: 8,000

SF #2 19 July 1977	East Perth	85-29	East Fremantle	Leederville Oval, Perth
	12.13 (85)		3.11 (29)	Attendance: 4,000 (estimate)

=== NFL Championship Series final ===
Final 26 July 1977	Norwood	69-61	East Perth	Norwood Oval, Adelaide
	3.0 (18); 6.2 (38); 8.3 (51); 10.9 (69)		2.1 (13); 4.4 (28); 8.7 (55); 9.7 (61)	Attendance: 12,000; Umpires: Peter Mead
		Goals
	Button, Michalanney 2 Gallagher, Gregg, Woodcock, Rosser, Adler, Von Bertouch 1		Spencer 3 Arnold 2 Otway, Verstegen, Stewart, Hamilton 1
