= 1978 NFL Championship Series (Australia) =

NFL Escort Cup

Tournament details
- Dates: 25 April – 25 July 1978
- Teams: 16
- Venue: 4 (in 4 host cities)

Final positions
- Champions: South Adelaide (1st title)
- Runners-up: Glenelg

Tournament statistics
- Matches played: 15
- Attendance: 52,529 (3,502 per match)

The 1978 NFL Championship Series was the third edition of the NFL Night Series, an NFL-organised national club Australian rules football tournament between the leading clubs from the SANFL, the WANFL, the VFA and State Representative Teams.

The 1978 NFL edition continued on a similar basis to the previous season with the VFL again running their own Night Series at VFL Park. However, the first signs of a breakaway appeared with the Tasmanian Representative Side choosing to participate in both the NFL and VFL competitions – making them the first non-VFL team to play in the VFL Night Series.

== Qualified teams ==
Team	Nickname	League	Qualification	Participation (bold indicates winners)^{1}
Port Adelaide	Magpies	SANFL	Winners of the 1977 South Australian National Football League	7th (Previous: **1890**, **1910**, **1913**, **1914**, 1976, 1977)
Glenelg	Tigers	SANFL	Runners-Up in the 1977 South Australian National Football League	4th (Previous: 1973, 1976, 1977)
West Adelaide	Bloods	SANFL	Third Place in the 1977 South Australian National Football League	5th (Previous: **1908**, 1909, **1911**, 1977)
South Adelaide	Panthers	SANFL	Fourth Place in the 1977 South Australian National Football League	4th (Previous: 1893, 1896, 1977)
Norwood	Redlegs	SANFL	Fifth Place in the 1977 South Australian National Football League	6th (Previous: **1888**, **1907**, 1975, 1976, **1977**)
Perth	Demons	WANFL	Winners of the 1977 Western Australian National Football League	2nd (Previous: 1977)
East Fremantle	Sharks	WANFL	Runners-Up in the 1977 Western Australian National Football League	3rd (Previous: 1974, 1977)
West Perth	Falcons	WANFL	Third Place in the 1977 Western Australian National Football League	4th (Previous: 1975, 1976, 1977)
East Perth	Royals	WANFL	Fourth Place in the 1977 Western Australian National Football League	2nd (Previous: 1972, 1977)
Port Melbourne	Boroughs	VFA	Winners of the 1977 Victorian Football Association Premiership	2nd (Previous: 1977)
Sandringham	Zebras	VFA	Runners-Up in the 1977 Victorian Football Association Premiership	1st
Coburg	Lions	VFA	Third Place in the 1977 Victorian Football Association Premiership	1st
Australian Capital Territory	Rams	ACTAFL	State Representative Team	2nd (Previous: 1977)
New South Wales	Blues	NSWAFL	State Representative Team	2nd (Previous: 1977)
Queensland	Maroons	QAFL	State Representative Team	2nd (Previous: 1977)
Tasmania	Devils	TANFL	State Representative Team	3rd (Previous: 1974, 1977)

^{1} Includes previous appearances in the Championship of Australia.

== Venues ==
Adelaide	Melbourne	Perth	Brisbane
Norwood Oval	Lake Oval	Subiaco Oval	Brisbane Cricket Ground
Capacity: 22,000	Capacity: 20,000	Capacity: 53,000	Capacity: 35,000

== Knockout stage ==
=== Round 1 ===
25 April 1978	Perth	94-76	West Adelaide	Subiaco Oval, Perth
	14.10 (94)		11.10 (76)	Attendance: 4,678

2 May 1978	Norwood	138-87	East Fremantle	Norwood Oval, Adelaide
	21.12 (138)		13.9 (87)	Attendance: 4,500 (estimate)

7 May 1978	Queensland	105-83	Tasmania	Brisbane Cricket Ground, Brisbane
	16.9 (105)		12.11 (83)	Attendance: 10,000

9 May 1978	Port Melbourne	92-46	New South Wales	Lake Oval, Melbourne
	12.20 (92)		7.4 (46)	Attendance: 3,682

16 May 1978	South Adelaide	87-56	Port Adelaide	Norwood Oval, Adelaide
	12.15 (87)		7.14 (56)	Attendance: 2,000 (estimate)

23 May 1978	Sandringham	82-78	Australian Capital Territory	Lake Oval, Melbourne
	12.10 (82)		12.6 (78)	Attendance: 2,680

30 May 1978	Glenelg	71-69	West Perth	Norwood Oval, Adelaide
	10.11 (71)		10.9 (69)	Attendance: 1,500 (estimate)

6 June 1978	Coburg	71-49	East Perth	Lake Oval, Melbourne
	10.11 (71)		7.7 (49)	Attendance: 1,280

=== Quarter-finals ===
QF #1 13 June 1978	Perth	106-93	Norwood	Subiaco Oval, Perth
	16.10 (106)		14.9 (93)	Attendance: 2,209

QF #2 20 June 1978	Port Melbourne	96-60	Queensland	Lake Oval, Melbourne
	13.18 (96)		9.6 (60)	Attendance: 3,000

QF #3 27 June 1978	Glenelg	101-84	Coburg	Norwood Oval, Adelaide
	15.11 (101)		13.6 (84)	Attendance: 2,500 (estimate)

QF #4 4 July 1978	Sandringham	35-94	South Adelaide	Lake Oval, Melbourne
	5.5 (35)		14.10 (94)	Attendance: 1,000

=== Semi-finals ===
SF #1 11 July 1978	Glenelg	92-70	Perth	Norwood Oval, Adelaide
	13.14 (92)		10.10 (70)	Attendance: 2,500 (estimate)

SF #2 18 July 1978	Port Melbourne	63-68	South Adelaide	Lake Oval, Melbourne
	9.9 (63)		9.14 (68)	Attendance: 2,000

=== NFL Championship Series final ===
Final 25 July 1978	South Adelaide	63-26	Glenelg	Norwood Oval, Adelaide
	3.0 (18); 4.2 (26); 5.3 (33); 9.9 (63)		1.3 (9); 2.6 (18); 2.7 (19); 3.8 (26)	Attendance: 9,000; Umpires: Peter Mead
		Goals
	Ruscuklic, Hateley, Lyons 2 Harradine, Keam, Schneebichler 1		Rady, McFarlane, Cornes 1
