= Escort Cup =

The Escort Cup or Escort Championships was a national club-based Australian rules football competition that was held between 1979 and 1982.

Club teams from the Victorian Football League (VFL), West Australian Football League (WAFL) and the South Australian National Football League (SANFL) competed in the competition, along with combined sides from Tasmania, New South Wales, Australian Capital Territory and Queensland.

The competition is remembered as having games between teams from different states that wore the same jumper, resulting in one-off alternative or clash strips being worn, a concept that was not necessary in normal league games. The Collingwood and South Fremantle Football Clubs both wore clash strips in their respective games against Swan Districts and the Sydney Swans. They both lost a coin toss to decide who would retain their normal jumper and who would change.

In June 1982, Swan Districts sent a junior team to play Richmond in protest to the date of their semi-final match being changed without consultation. In response, they were banned from competing in the national cup competition for the next two years.

== Competing teams ==
Year	Teams	VFL	SANFL	WAFL	State
1979	23	All 12	–	All 8	Tasmania, N.S.W., A.C.T.
1980	34	All 12	All 10	All 8	Tasmania, N.S.W., A.C.T., Queensland
1981	34	All 12	All 10	All 8	Tasmania, N.S.W., A.C.T., Queensland
1982	18	All 12	Glenelg, Norwood, Port Adelaide	Claremont, South Fremantle, Swan Districts	–

== Grand Final results ==
Despite teams from all major leagues being involved in the competition, only teams from the Victorian Football League played in the four grand finals.

Year	Winners	Grand Finalist	Scores	Venue	Crowd	Margin
1979	Collingwood	Hawthorn	12.8 (80) – 7.10 (52)	Waverley Park	37,753	28
1980	North Melbourne	Collingwood	8.9 (57) – 7.12 (54)	Waverley Park	50,478	3
1981	Essendon	Carlton	9.11 (65) – 6.5 (41)	Waverley Park	42,269	24
1982	Sydney Swans	North Melbourne	13.12 (90) – 8.10 (58)	Waverley Park	20,028	32
