= Night Series =

Night Series may refer to any of the following Australian rules football competitions which were played primarily at night:

- VFL Night Series, a consolation series played between 1956 and 1971 amongst non-finalists from the Victorian Football League
- NFL Night Series, a mid-year series played between 1976 and 1979 amongst Victorian, South Australian, Western Australian and Queensland clubs and minor state representative teams and administered by the National Football League
- AFC Night Series, a pre-season and mid-year series played between 1977 and 1987 amongst Victorian, South Australian, Western Australian and minor state representative teams and administered first by the Victorian Football League, then by Australian Football Championships

== See also ==
- List of Australian Football League pre-season and night series premiers
- Australian Football League pre-season competition
