= Jimmy Morris (Australian footballer) =

Australian rules footballer

Personal information
- Full name: James Morris
- Born: 16 July 1891; Shepparton
- Died: 30 May 1971 (aged 79); Bendigo, Victoria
- Original team: Shepparton
- Height: 165 cm (5 ft 5 in)
- Weight: 61 kg (134 lb)
- Position: Midfield

Playing career^{1}
Years	Club	Games (Goals)
1914–17	Carlton	26 (14)
- ^{1} Playing statistics correct to the end of 1917.

Jimmy Morris (16 July 1891 – 30 May 1971) was an Australian rules footballer who played for Carlton in the Victorian Football League (VFL).

Morris was recruited from Shepparton in the Goulburn Valley Football Netball League and made his debut against St Kilda late in the 1914 VFL season and the following week kicked three goals in a win over Richmond. He kept his place in the team for the finals and in just his fifth league game was the rover in Carlton's victorious 1914 Grand Final side.

In 1915 he missed just two games all year and was again a premiership player, this time as a wingman. He made just one appearance in 1916, as a centreman in the Grand Final, but this time experienced a loss.

This gave him the unusual distinction of appearing in three VFL Grand Finals from his first 25 games. He participated in one further league game the following season and never appeared for Carlton again.
