= Dan Keily =

Australian rules footballer

Personal information
- Full name: Mortimer Patrick Keily
- Born: 16 May 1892; Melbourne, Victoria
- Died: 28 June 1967 (aged 75); Preston, Victoria
- Original team: Brighton Jrs / Havelock
- Height: 178 cm (5 ft 10 in)
- Weight: 73 kg (161 lb)
- Positions: Full-back, Wingman

Playing career^{1}
Years	Club	Games (Goals)
1914–17, 1919–21	Carlton	53 (1)
- ^{1} Playing statistics correct to the end of 1921.

Mortimer 'Dan' Keily (16 May 1892 – 28 June 1967) was an Australian rules footballer who played for Carlton in the Victorian Football League (VFL).

Keily, a Brighton junior and former Havelock player, struggled to cement a place in a strong Carlton team which made the finals in every season that he was at the club. After missing out on the 1914 and 1915 premierships, Keily was a losing Grand Finalist in 1916. A wingman or fullback, he received a life suspension after Carlton's 1917 semi-final loss to Fitzroy for using abusive language toward a steward at the subsequent tribunal hearing. The life suspension was lifted in the second half of the 1919 season, with Keily having effectively served a 24 match ban.
