= Athol Sharp =

Australian rules footballer

Personal information
- Full name: George William Athol Sharp
- Born: 1 April 1894; Newmarket
- Died: 19 April 1969 (aged 75); Melbourne, Victoria
- Original team: Moonee Ponds
- Height: 170 cm (5 ft 7 in)
- Weight: 67 kg (148 lb)
- Position: Forward

Playing career^{1}
Years	Club	Games (Goals)
1913–1916, 1920	Carlton	56 (41)
- ^{1} Playing statistics correct to the end of 1920.

George William Athol Sharp (1 April 1894 – 19 April 1969) was an Australian rules footballer who played with Carlton in the Victorian Football League (VFL).

Sharp, a forward, was recruited by Carlton from Moonee Ponds. He missed out on playing in Carlton's 1914 premiership team through injury but was a forward pocket and second rover in their 1915 VFL Grand Final winning side. In 1916 he missed another grand final, with a broken collarbone, but Carlton would lose on that occasion.

He served his country during the war and then returned to Carlton for one final season in 1920.
