= 1976 NFL Championship Series (Australia) =

NFL Wills Cup

Tournament details
- Dates: 17 May - 17 August 1976
- Teams: 12
- Venue(s): 3 (in 2 host cities)

Final positions
- Champions: Hawthorn (2nd title)
- Runners-up: North Melbourne

Tournament statistics
- Matches played: 15
- Attendance: 106,214 (7,081 per match)

The 1976 NFL Championship Series was the 1st edition of the NFL Night Series, a national club Australian rules football tournament organised by the National Football League (NFL) between the leading clubs from the VFL, the SANFL and the WANFL.

It replaced the Championship of Australia tournament that been contested between the champion clubs of the VFL, the SANFL, the WANFL and the Tasmanian State Premiership between 1972 and 1975 and, as with those earlier tournaments, the games were (mostly) played in Adelaide.

The 1976 NFL Night Series was planned as a forerunner to a full-scale national competition in 1977 that would feature all the VFL, SANFL and WANFL teams plus representative teams from Tasmania, Queensland, New South Wales and the ACT.

Ultimately, the 1976 competition would be the only one to feature the VFL clubs - the Victorian League chose to break away in 1977 and run a rival competition, the VFL Night Series.

== Qualified Teams ==
Team	Nickname	League	Qualification	Participation (bold indicates winners)^{1}
North Melbourne	Kangaroos	VFL	Winners of the 1975 Victorian Football League	2nd (Previous: **1975**)
Hawthorn	Hawks	VFL	Runners-Up in the 1975 Victorian Football League	2nd (Previous: **1971**)
Richmond	Tigers	VFL	Third Place in the 1975 Victorian Football League	4th (Previous: **1969**, **1973**, **1974**)
Carlton	Blues	VFL	Fourth Place in the 1975 Victorian Football League	7th (Previous: 1907, 1908, 1914, **1968**, **1970**, 1972)
Footscray	Bulldogs	VFL	Seventh Place in the 1975 Victorian Football League^{2}	1st
Norwood	Redlegs	SANFL	Winners of the 1975 South Australian National Football League	4th (Previous: **1888**, **1907**, 1975)
Glenelg	Tigers	SANFL	Runners-Up in the 1975 South Australian National Football League	2nd (Previous: 1973)
Port Adelaide	Magpies	SANFL	Third Place in the 1975 South Australian National Football League	5th (Previous: **1890**, **1910**, **1913**, **1914**)
Sturt	Double Blues	SANFL	Fourth Place in the 1975 South Australian National Football League	5th (Previous: 1968, 1969, 1970, 1974)
West Perth	Falcons	WANFL	Winners of the 1975 Western Australian National Football League	2nd (Previous: 1975)
South Fremantle	Bulldogs	WANFL	Runners-Up in the 1975 Western Australian National Football League	1st
Swan Districts	Swans	WANFL	Third Place in the 1975 Western Australian National Football League	1st

^{1} Includes previous appearances in the Championship of Australia.
^{2} Replaced Collingwood and St Kilda who both declined to participate.

== Venues ==
Adelaide		Perth
Norwood Oval	Football Park	Subiaco Oval
Capacity: 22,000	Capacity: 67,000	Capacity: 53,000

== Group stage ==
=== Group A ===
Team	Pld	W	D	L	PF	PA	%	Pts
Glenelg	2	2	0	0	161	130	123.8	8
Richmond	2	1	0	1	185	126	146.8	4
Swan Districts	2	0	0	2	118	208	56.7	0

17 May 1976	Glenelg	76-62	Richmond	Football Park, Adelaide
	11.10 (76)		9.8 (62)	Attendance: 13,693

12 June 1976	Swan Districts	68-85	Glenelg	Subiaco Oval, Perth
	10.8 (68)		11.19 (85)	Attendance: 10,876

29 June 1976	Richmond	123-50	Swan Districts	Norwood Oval, Adelaide
	18.15 (123)		7.8 (50)	Attendance: 400

=== Group B ===
Team	Pld	W	D	L	PF	PA	%	Pts
North Melbourne	2	2	0	0	191	113	169.0	8
Port Adelaide	2	1	0	1	134	150	89.3	4
Footscray	2	0	0	2	169	201	84.1	0

1 June 1976	Port Adelaide	97-63	Footscray	Norwood Oval, Adelaide
	14.13 (97)		9.9 (63)	Attendance: 5,818

15 June 1976	North Melbourne	87-37	Port Adelaide	Norwood Oval, Adelaide
	12.15 (87)		5.7 (37)	Attendance: 9,000

13 July 1976	North Melbourne	104-76	Footscray	Norwood Oval, Adelaide
	16.8 (104)		11.10 (76)	Attendance: 2,081

=== Group C ===
Team	Pld	W	D	L	PF	PA	%	Pts
Hawthorn	2	2	0	0	202	99	204.0	8
Sturt	2	1	0	1	146	158	92.4	4
West Perth	2	0	0	2	109	200	54.5	0

7 June 1976	West Perth	46-107	Hawthorn	Subiaco Oval, Perth
	7.4 (46)		15.17 (107)	Attendance: 9,860

14 June 1976	Sturt	93-63	West Perth	Football Park, Adelaide
	14.9 (93)		9.9 (63)	Attendance: 12,777

6 July 1976	Sturt	53-95	Hawthorn	Norwood Oval, Adelaide
	8.5 (53)		13.17 (95)	Attendance: 8,839

=== Group D ===
Team	Pld	W	D	L	PF	PA	%	Pts
Norwood	2	2	0	0	231	110	210.0	8
Carlton	2	1	0	1	188	169	111.2	4
South Fremantle	2	0	0	2	93	294	31.6	0

8 June 1976	Carlton	148-23	South Fremantle	Norwood Oval, Adelaide
	22.16 (148)		3.5 (23)	Attendance: 1,500

22 June 1976	Norwood	146-40	Carlton	Norwood Oval, Adelaide
	22.14 (146)		5.10 (40)	Attendance: 7,500

20 July 1976	Norwood	85-70	South Fremantle	Norwood Oval, Adelaide
	11.19 (85)		10.10 (70)	Attendance: 3,250

== Knockout stage ==
=== Semi-finals ===
SF #1 27 July 1976	Hawthorn	82-56	Glenelg	Norwood Oval, Adelaide
	11.16 (82)		8.8 (56)	Attendance: 8,086

SF #2 3 August 1976	North Melbourne	53-35	Norwood	Norwood Oval, Adelaide
	8.5 (53)		5.5 (35)	Attendance: 5,160

=== NFL Championship Series final ===
Final 17 August 1976	Hawthorn	89-41	North Melbourne	Norwood Oval, Adelaide
	3.6 (24); 5.7 (37); 7.13 (55); 12.17 (89)	Report	1.1 (7); 1.4 (10); 4.8 (32); 5.11 (41)	Attendance: 7,374; Umpires: Peter Mead
		Goals
	M Moncrieff 4 A Goad 3 G Ablett, D Scott 2 L Matthews 1		S Kekovich, M Blight 2 P Feltham 1
