= 1981 SANFL season =

- Teams: 10
- Premiers: Port Adelaide; 27th premiership
- Minor premiers: Glenelg; 3rd minor premiership
- Magarey Medallist: Michael Aish; Norwood (41 votes)
- Ken Farmer Medallist: Tim Evans; Port Adelaide (98 Goals)

Attendance
- Matches played: 116
- Total attendance: 1,087,854 (9,378 per match)
- Highest: 52,659 (Grand Final, Port Adelaide vs. Glenelg)

The 1981 South Australian National Football League season was the 102nd season of the top-level Australian rules football competition in South Australia.

== Ladder ==
1981 SANFL Ladder
Pos	Team	Pld	W	L	D	PF	PA	PP	Pts
1	Glenelg	22	19	3	0	2769	2029	57.71	38
2	Port Adelaide (P)	22	15	7	0	2414	1983	54.90	30
3	South Adelaide	22	15	7	0	2296	2002	53.42	30
4	Norwood	22	13	8	1	2430	2096	53.69	27
5	West Adelaide	22	11	10	1	2526	2259	52.79	23
6	Sturt	22	11	10	1	2262	2286	49.74	23
7	Central District	22	11	11	0	2523	2233	53.05	22
8	North Adelaide	22	7	15	0	2179	2558	46.00	14
9	West Torrens	22	3	18	1	2020	2631	43.43	7
10	Woodville	22	3	19	0	1820	3162	36.53	6

Rules for classification: 1) points; 2) percentage; 3) number of points for.
(P) Premiers

== Finals series ==
=== Grand Final ===
1981 SANFL Grand Final
Saturday, 3 October (2:10pm)	Glenelg	def. by	Port Adelaide	Football Park (crowd: 52,659)
1.0 (6); 2.4 (16); 2.5 (17); 6.8 (44)	Q1; Q2; Q3; Final	6.5 (41); 8.6 (54); 12.11 (81); 14.11 (95)
