= Australian Football Championships night series =

Australian Football Championships Night Series
- Sport: Australian rules football
- Founded: 1979
- No. of teams: 14 – 34
- Country: Australia
- Venue: VFL Park
- Most titles: Essendon, Hawthorn (2 premierships)
- Related competitions: NFL Night Series, VFL, SANFL, WAFL

The Australian Football Championships (AFC) night series, known during its history by a variety of sponsored names, was an Australian rules football tournament held annually between 1979 and 1986. The competition was a knock-out competition featuring clubs from the Victorian Football League, South Australian National Football League, West Australian Football League and state representative teams from the minor states, and matches were played primarily on weekday nights concurrently with the respective leagues' premiership seasons.

== History ==
In 1976, the National Football League, which was the national administrative body for Australian rules football at the time, established the NFL Night Series. Played concurrently with the premiership season, the Night Series was contested among twelve clubs from the VFL, SANFL and WANFL invited based on their finishing positions from the previous year. The event was mostly played on Tuesday nights, with night games at Norwood Oval in Adelaide, and all games were televised live in colour on Channel 9, which opened up unprecedented revenue streams from television rights and sponsorship opportunities for the sport. The NFL began plans to expand its Night Series to incorporate more teams from the VFL, SANFL and WAFL, as well as state representative teams from other states.

In November 1976, the VFL announced that it was withdrawing from the NFL's competition, having secretly arranged more substantial television and sponsorship deals for its own Night Series for 1977 to be based in Melbourne and feature only the VFL clubs. Light towers were erected at VFL Park specifically for the event. The VFL successfully ran their own rival Night Series in 1977-78 and in July 1978 announced the establishment of a proprietary limited company named Australian Football Championships Pty Ltd to run the 1979 Night Series, and offered shareholdings to the other state leagues in an attempt to lure other states into the competition.

For the three years from 1977 until 1979, the NFL and VFL/AFC competitions were run separately as rival Night Series. In 1978, the Tasmanian representative team competed in both the NFL and VFL series, but all SANFL and WAFL clubs and the minor states teams remained in the NFL Night Series. In 1979, the WAFL clubs and the New South Wales and A.C.T. representative teams defected from the NFL Night Series and joined the new AFC Night Series, leaving the NFL Night Series mostly composed of SANFL teams. The NFL Night Series was not revived in 1980, and the SANFL clubs joined the AFC Night Series. Although the NFL itself continued to exist as an administrative body into the early 1990s, the power gained by the VFL as a result of its Night Series take over was one of the first significant steps in its spread interstate and ultimately its take-over (as the Australian Football League) of administrative control of all football in Australia.

In 1980 and 1981, the first years after the NFL Night Series had ended, the AFC Night Series competition was at its largest, with all VFL, WAFL and SANFL clubs plus the four minor states teams (selected under residential qualification rather than state of origin qualification) competing for a total of 34 teams. The size of the competition was reduced from 1982, and thereafter only the top two or three teams from the SANFL and WAFL and the winner of the minor states' annual carnival were invited.

The series was not without its controversy, as clubs prioritised the day premiership above the night premiership. Swan Districts received a two-year ban from Night Series competition in 1982 after sending a team of colts and reserves players instead of his senior line-up to avoid disrupting his premiership season preparations; the young squad lost to Richmond by a record margin of 186 points. The 1980 Night Series Grand Final was also notorious for its ending, as the final siren was not heard by the umpire, allowing play to continue for several seconds during which North Melbourne secured the mark from which the winning goal was kicked against Collingwood.

The 1986 Night Series was the last to be played under the AFC banner. In 1987 the VFL expanded to a national competition with the addition of two new interstate clubs, the Brisbane Bears and the West Coast Eagles resulting in the AFC Board disbanding and the Night Series reverting to a VFL-run competition featuring only the VFL teams. The 1987 competition was pushed earlier into the year, with the final played on 28 April. By 1988 the competition did not overlap with the day premiership season at all, and became entirely a pre-season competition. The AFC Night Series is generally considered to be of equivalent importance as the VFL-AFL pre-season competition and the VFL Night Series (1956–1971/1977-1978,1987), and records relating to the three competitions are often combined.

=== Participating teams ===
Year	Teams	VFL	SANFL	WAFL	State
1979	23	All 12	–	All 8	Tasmania, N.S.W., A.C.T.
1980	34	All 12	All 10	All 8	Tasmania, N.S.W., A.C.T., Queensland
1981	34	All 12	All 10	All 8	Tasmania, N.S.W., A.C.T., Queensland
1982	18	All 12	Glenelg, Norwood, Port Adelaide	Claremont, South Fremantle, Swan Districts	–
1983	17	All 12	Glenelg, Norwood	Claremont, West Perth	Tasmania
1984	17	All 12	Sturt, West Adelaide	Claremont, South Fremantle	Queensland
1985	17	All 12	Norwood, Port Adelaide	East Fremantle, Swan Districts	Queensland
1986	14	All 12	Glenelg, North Adelaide	–	–

== Format ==
The AFC Night Series was mostly played as a simple knock-out competition, with lower-ranked teams entering the competition in earlier qualifying rounds and higher ranked teams joining the competition later. Occasionally there were teams who advanced as "lucky losers" to keep the numbers even. Other than some of the early qualification round matches, games were played under floodlights at VFL Park on Tuesday nights, and were broadcast on television in colour. The season generally began in early March (about a month before the day premiership began) and finished in July.

== Naming rights sponsors ==
- Escort Championships (1979–82)
- Sterling Cup (1983–84)
- Foster's Football Cup (1985–86)

== Winners ==
The Victorian teams, which often recruited the best players from interstate, dominated the competition. During the history of the competition, no non-VFL club ever reached the grand final. The best performance by a non-VFL club was reaching the semi-finals, achieved three times: East Perth 1979, Claremont 1980 and North Adelaide 1986.

Hawthorn, the VFL's dominant club in the day premiership from the mid-1970s until the early 1990s, and Essendon were the most successful clubs in this competition, winning four of the eight AFC night premierships contested. Hawthorn had also won the 1976 NFL Night Series and 1977 VFL Night Series, held prior to the AFC series.

Year	Winners	Grand Finalist	Scores	Venue	Crowd	Margin	Season Result
1979	Collingwood	Hawthorn	12.8 (80) – 7.10 (52)	VFL Park	37,753	28	Grand Finalist
1980	North Melbourne	Collingwood	8.9 (57) – 7.12 (54)	VFL Park	50,478	3	Elimination Finalist
1981	Essendon	Carlton	9.11 (65) – 6.5 (41)	VFL Park	42,269	24	Elimination Finalist
1982	Sydney	North Melbourne	13.12 (90) – 8.10 (58)	VFL Park	20,028	32	7th
1983	Carlton	Richmond	14.16 (100) – 10.6 (66)	VFL Park	32,927	34	Elimination Finalist
1984	Essendon	Sydney Swans	13.11 (89) – 5.8 (38)	VFL Park	30,824	51	Premier
1985	Hawthorn	Essendon	11.11 (77) – 10.8 (68)	VFL Park	24,812	9	Grand Finalist
1986	Hawthorn	Carlton	9.12 (66) – 5.6 (36)	VFL Park	19,627	30	Premier

=== Most AFC Night Series Titles ===
Club	Titles	Years won
Essendon	2	1981, 1984
Hawthorn	2	1985, 1986
Carlton	1	1983
Collingwood	1	1979
North Melbourne	1	1980
Sydney	1	1982

== See also ==
- List of Australian Football League pre-season and night series premiers
- NFL Night Series
