= 1972 Championship of Australia =

Winfield Cup - 1972 Champions of Australia Series

Tournament details
- City: Adelaide
- Dates: 14–15 October 1972
- Teams: 4
- Venue(s): 1

Final positions
- Champions: North Adelaide (1st title)
- Runners-up: Carlton
- Third place: East Perth
- Fourth place: City-South

Tournament statistics
- Matches played: 4
- Attendance: 42,812 (10,703 per match)

The 1972 Championship of Australia was the 16th edition of the Championship of Australia, an ANFC-organised national club Australian rules football tournament between the champion clubs from the VFL, the SANFL, the WANFL and the Tasmanian State Premiership.

== Qualified Teams ==
Team	Nickname	League	Qualification	Participation (bold indicates winners)
Carlton	Blues	VFL	Winners of the 1972 Victorian Football League	6th (Previous: 1907, 1908, 1914, **1968**, **1970**)
North Adelaide	Roosters	SANFL	Winners of the 1972 South Australian National Football League	2nd (Previous: 1971)
East Perth	Royals	WANFL	Winners of the 1972 Western Australian National Football League	1st
City-South	Redlegs	NTFA	Winners of the 1972 Tasmanian State Premiership	1st

== Venue ==
- Adelaide Oval (Capacity: **64,000**)

== Fixtures ==
=== Semi-finals ===
**SF #1** 14 October 1972	**Carlton**	**135-84**	**East Perth**	Adelaide Oval, Adelaide
	20.15 (135)		12.12 (84)	Attendance: 19,599

**SF #2** 14 October 1972	**North Adelaide**	**143-74**	**City-South**	Adelaide Oval, Adelaide
	20.23 (143)		11.8 (74)	Attendance: 19,599

=== Third-place play-off ===
**Third Place** 15 October 1972	**East Perth**	**79-72**	**City-South**	Adelaide Oval, Adelaide
	11.13 (79)		10.12 (72)	Attendance: 23,213

=== Championship of Australia final ===
Final 15 October 1972	**North Adelaide**	**73-72**	**Carlton**	Adelaide Oval, Adelaide
	3.5 (23); 5.6 (36); 8.12 (60); 10.13 (73)	Report	3.5 (23); 7.10 (52); 9.11 (65); 10.12 (72)	Attendance: 23,213; Umpires: William Deller
		**Goals**
	A Rebbeck 4 J Plummer 2 D Sachse, D Webb, D Marsh, B Robran 1		R Walls 3 G Kennedy 2 S Jackson, J Warden, G Crane, T Keogh, J Nicholls 1
