= 1970 Championship of Australia =

Australian rules football match

Carlton	Sturt
21.13 (139)	12.22 (94)
	1	2	3	4
CAR	5.1 (31)	10.7 (67)	17.10 (112)	21.13 (139)
STU	3.5 (23)	6.8 (44)	9.14 (68)	12.22 (94)
- Date: 3 October 1970
- Stadium: Adelaide Oval
- Attendance: 37,785
- Umpires: Lindsay Johnson

The 1970 Championship of Australia was the 14th edition of the Championship of Australia, an ANFC-organised national club Australian rules football match between the champion clubs from the VFL and the SANFL.

== Qualified Teams ==
Team	Nickname	League	Qualification	Participation (bold indicates winners)
Carlton	Blues	VFL	Winners of the 1970 Victorian Football League	5th (Previous: 1907, 1908, 1914, **1968**)
Sturt	Double Blues	SANFL	Winners of the 1970 South Australian National Football League	3rd (Previous: 1968, 1969)

== Venue ==
- Adelaide Oval (Capacity: **64,000**)

== Match details ==
=== Championship of Australia ===
3 October 1970	**Carlton**	**139-94**	**Sturt**	Adelaide Oval, Adelaide
	5.1 (31); 10.7 (67); 17.10 (112); 21.13 (139)	Report	3.5 (23); 6.8 (44); 9.14 (68); 12.22 (94)	Attendance: 37,785; Umpires: Lindsay Johnson
		**Goals**
	A Jesaulenko 8 S Jackson, T Hopkins 3 J Nicholls, R Walls 2 B Crosswell, P Jones, S Silvagni 1		M Greenslade 6 J Tilbrook 4 G Wild, M Nunan 1
