= NFL Night Series =

The NFL Night Series was an Australian rules football tournament which was contested annually from 1976 until 1979. The tournament, played concurrently with the premiership season, was contested at different times by football clubs from the Victorian, South Australian, Western Australian and Queensland football leagues, and was operated by the National Football League, which was the national administrative body for the sport.

In 1977, a rival competition was established in Victoria in the form of the Australian Football Championships Night Series (AFC). From the 1980 season onwards, following termination of the NFL Night Series, it was effectively superseded by the AFC.

== History ==
From 1968 until 1975, the Australian National Football Council (later renamed the National Football League) had operated a post-season Championship of Australia tournament amongst the premiers of the Victorian Football League, South Australian National Football League, West Australian Football League and Tasmanian State Premiership. In 1976, the National Football League extended this concept significantly by establishing the Night Series. The Night Series was an extended competition which ran concurrently with the premiership season, featuring multiple teams from each state, who initially qualified based on their finishing positions in the previous year. Most of the matches were played on weekday nights and broadcast live to a national television audience, which was a new sponsorship opportunity which the sport had never previously enjoyed. Although the competition did not bear many structural similarities to the Championship of Australia series, it is often seen as its natural successor; and, the post-season Championship of Australia tournament was discontinued in the same year.

In 1976, the Night Series was known as the NFL Wills Cup. There were a total of 12 clubs: five from the VFL, four from the SANFL and three from the West Australian National Football League, with qualification based on performance in the 1975 season. They were divided into four groups of three and the winners of each group met in the semi-finals. Most games were played in Adelaide, and some were played in Perth.

After the success of the 1976 competition, particularly for television numbers, VFL withdrew its teams from the NFL's night series, and established its own rival night series based at VFL Park in Melbourne. This caused a rift between the VFL and the other states. The NFL continued its night series, now known as the Ardath Cup and played as a knock-out tournament, featuring eight SANFL clubs, six WAFL clubs, four Victorian Football Association clubs and four state representative teams from the minor states (Tasmania, New South Wales, Queensland and the Australian Capital Territory). The 1978 tournament, now known as the Escort Cup, was similar but slightly smaller, played as a sixteen-team knock-out tournament featuring five SANFL clubs, four WAFL clubs, three VFA clubs, and the four minor state teams.

In 1979, in what would turn out to be the final NFL Night Series, the minor states and the WAFL clubs defected to the VFL's Night Series, which was now being operated by a VFL-established company called Australian Football Championships; the NFL Night Series was now contested by just the ten SANFL clubs, two VFA clubs and two Queensland Australian Football League clubs, and had lost much of its importance. In 1980, the SANFL clubs joined the VFL Night Series, and the NFL Night Series was discontinued.

== Naming rights sponsors ==
- Wills Cup (1976)
- Ardath Cup (1977)
- Escort Cup (1978–79)

== Participating teams ==
Year	Teams	VFL	SANFL	WAFL	VFA	QAFL	State
1976	12	North Melbourne, Hawthorn, Richmond, Carlton, Footscray	Norwood, Glenelg, Port Adelaide, Sturt	West Perth, South Fremantle, Swan Districts	–	–	–
1977	22	–	8 (all except Woodville, West Torrens)	6 (all except Swan Districts, Subiaco)	Port Melbourne, Dandenong, Preston, Caulfield	–	Tasmania, N.S.W., A.C.T., Queensland
1978	16	–	Port Adelaide, Glenelg, West Adelaide, South Adelaide, Norwood	Perth, East Fremantle, West Perth, East Perth	Port Melbourne, Sandringham, Coburg	–	Tasmania, N.S.W., A.C.T., Queensland
1979	14	–	All 10	–	Prahran, Preston	Western Districts, Windsor-Zillmere	–

== Champions by year ==
NFL Champions
Year	Champion	Runner-up	Score	Venue	Crowd
1976	Hawthorn	North Melbourne	12.17 (89) d. 5.11 (41)	Norwood Oval	7,374
Post VFL involvement
1977	Norwood	East Perth	10.9 (69) d. 9.7 (61)	Norwood Oval	12,000
1978	South Adelaide	Glenelg	9.9 (63) d. 3.8 (26)	Norwood Oval	9,000
1979	South Adelaide	Norwood	7.9 (51) d. 5.10 (40)	Norwood Oval	12,516

== Most NFL Night Series Titles ==
Club	Titles	Years won
South Adelaide	2	1978, 1979
Hawthorn	1	1976
Norwood	1	1977
