= 1974 Championship of Australia =

Winfield Cup - 1974 Champions of Australia Series

Tournament details
- City: Adelaide
- Dates: 12–14 October 1974
- Teams: 4
- Venue(s): 1

Final positions
- Champions: Richmond (3rd title)
- Runners-up: Sturt
- Third place: East Fremantle
- Fourth place: Tasmanian League

Tournament statistics
- Matches played: 4
- Attendance: 38,475 (9,619 per match)

The 1974 Championship of Australia was the 18th edition of the Championship of Australia, an ANFC-organised national club Australian rules football tournament between the champion clubs from the VFL, the SANFL, the WANFL and a Tasmanian League side that contain players drawn from the premier clubs of the NTFA, NWFU and TANFL.

== Qualified Teams ==
Team	Nickname	League	Qualification	Participation (bold indicates winners)
Richmond	Tigers	VFL	Winners of the 1974 Victorian Football League	3rd (Previous: **1969**, **1973**)
Sturt	Double Blues	SANFL	Winners of the 1974 South Australian National Football League	4th (Previous: 1968, 1969, 1970)
East Fremantle	Sharks	WANFL	Winners of the 1974 Western Australian National Football League	1st
Tasmanian League	Devils	TANFL, NTFA, NWFU	Representative Side from the premier clubs of the TANFL, the NTFA and the NWFU.	1st

== Venue ==
Adelaide
Football Park
Capacity: **67,000**
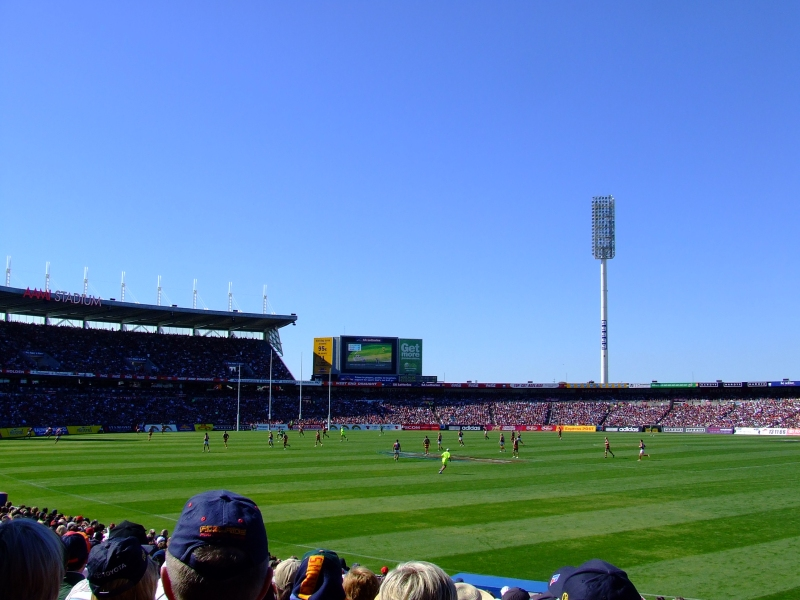

== Fixtures ==
=== Semi-finals ===
**SF #1** 12 October 1974	**Richmond**	**233-16**	**Tasmanian League**	Football Park, Adelaide
	34.29 (233)	Report	2.4 (16)	Attendance: 18,354

**SF #2** 12 October 1974	**Sturt**	**114-105**	**East Fremantle**	Football Park, Adelaide
	16.18 (114)		16.9 (105)	Attendance: 18,354

=== Third-place play-off ===
**Third Place** 14 October 1974	**East Fremantle**	**180-66**	**Tasmanian League**	Football Park, Adelaide
	28.12 (180)		10.6 (66)	Attendance: 20,121

=== Championship of Australia final ===
Final 14 October 1974	**Richmond**	**173-95**	**Sturt**	Football Park, Adelaide
	7.2 (44); 14.5 (89); 25.8 (158); 27.11 (173)	Report	5.4 (34); 7.9 (51); 8.12 (60); 13.17 (95)	Attendance: 20,121; Umpires: Ross Capes
		**Goals**
	B Richardson 5 N Balme 4 D Cloke, K Sheedy, D Thorpe 3 K Bartlett, W Walsh, R Hart, D Cumming 2 M Green 1		M Graham, R Klomp, K Whelan, M Greenslade 2 G Wild, R Oatey, R Davies, M Nunan, R Barton 1
