= 1968 Championship of Australia =

Carlton	Sturt
13.15 (93)	6.20 (56)
	1	2	3	4
CAR	7.4 (31)	9.7 (61)	12.12 (84)	13.15 (93)
STU	2.2 (14)	4.10 (34)	4.13 (37)	6.20 (56)
- Date: 5 October 1968
- Stadium: Adelaide Oval
- Attendance: 38,926
- Umpires: Max O'Connell

The 1968 Championship of Australia was the 12th edition of the Championship of Australia, an ANFC-organised national club Australian rules football match between the champion clubs from the VFL and the SANFL.

This was the first Championship of Australia match to be held since 1914.

== Qualified Teams ==
Team	Nickname	League	Qualification	Participation (bold indicates winners)
Carlton	Blues	VFL	Winners of the 1968 Victorian Football League	4th (Previous: 1907, 1908, 1914)
Sturt	Double Blues	SANFL	Winners of the 1968 South Australian National Football League	1st

== Venue ==
- Adelaide Oval (Capacity: **64,000**)

== Match details ==
=== Championship of Australia ===
5 October 1968	**Carlton**	**93-56**	**Sturt**	Adelaide Oval, Adelaide
	7.4 (31); 9.7 (61); 12.12 (84); 13.15 (93)	Report	2.2 (14); 4.10 (34); 4.13 (37); 6.20 (56)	Attendance: 38,926; Umpires: Max O'Connell
		**Goals**
	B Kekovich 4 B Bennett, P Jones 3 A Gallagher, D Munari, B Quirk 1		P Endersbee 2 J Tilbrook, R Schoff, R Rigney, T Clarkson 1
