= Championship of Australia =

Australian rules football tournament

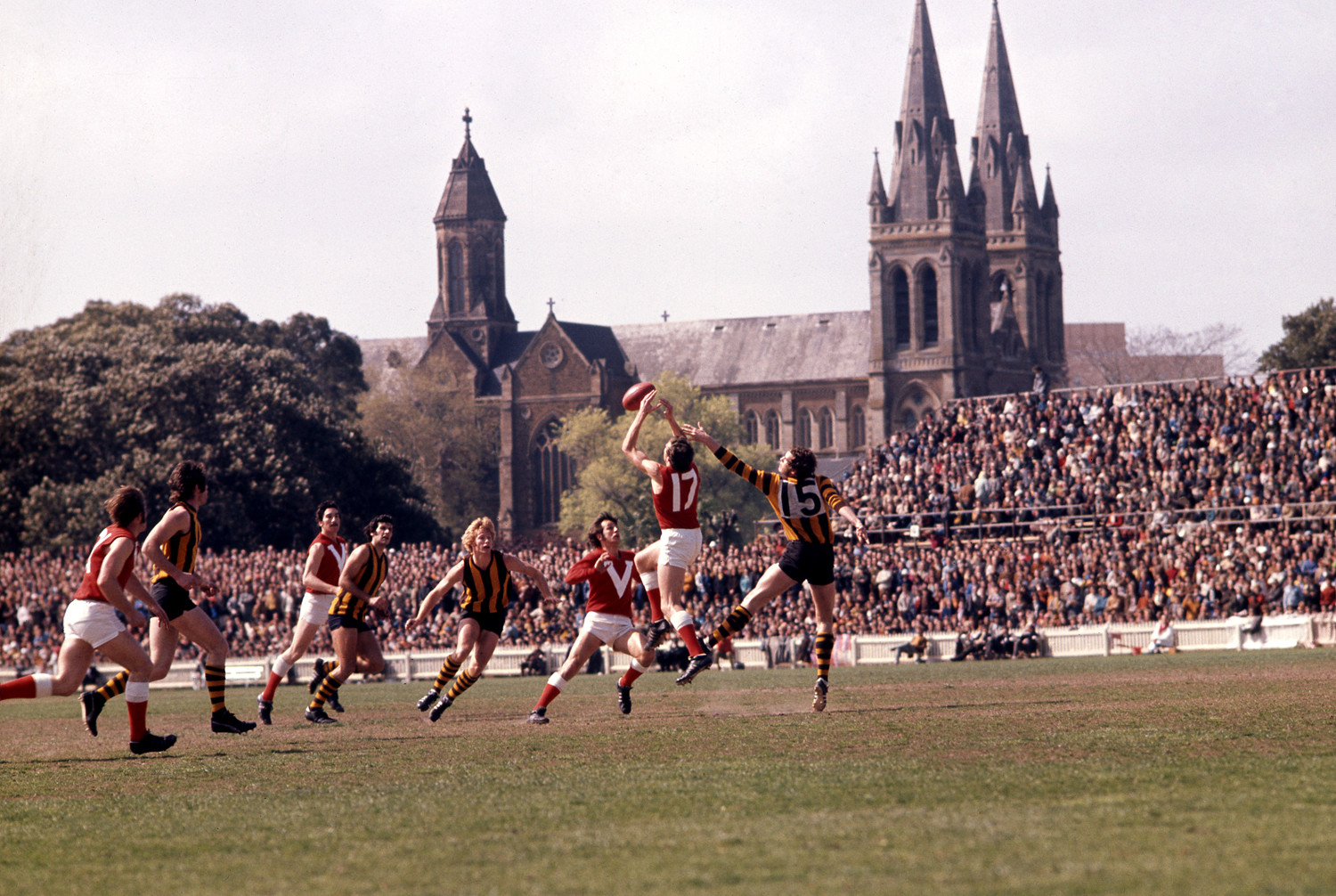
- North Adelaide playing Hawthorn for the 1971 Championship of Australia at Adelaide Oval.
- Organiser(s): Australian National Football Council (1972–1975)
- Founded: 1888; 138 years ago
- Abolished: 1976; 50 years ago
- Region: Australia
- Teams: 2-4
- Related competitions: VFL, SANFL, WAFL, TFL
- Last champions: North Melbourne (1975)
- Most championships: Port Adelaide (4 titles)

The Championship of Australia was an Australian rules football tournament which was contested between football clubs from the Victorian and South Australian football leagues for most of its history, with clubs from the Western Australian and Tasmanian football leagues only being included in the final four iterations. The Championship took place four times in the 19th century and then from 1907 to 1914 — with the exception of 1912 — and every year from 1968 to 1975. All but two of the Championships were played in Adelaide, and all of them occurred after the respective league seasons had ended. The 1975 Championship of Australia was the last edition of the competition, with the 1976 NFL Championship replacing the format, albeit for only one year with VFL clubs.

== History ==
The first group of Champions of Australia competitions were held between the Victorian Football Association and South Australian Football Association premiers while from 1907 until 1914, the final competition for 54 years, it was contested between the premiers of the VFL and SAFL. Port Adelaide were champions a record four times during this period. The inaugural Championship was a best-of-three-game series but all future tournaments were decided by a Grand Final. The premier teams from other states were not included in these tournaments.

In 1968 the Championship returned under the same format but the Australian National Football Council refused to grant it official status as teams from Western Australia and Tasmania were not competing and it thus couldn't be referred to as a Championship of 'Australia'. Both states' premiers joined the tournament from 1972 onwards to make it a four-club championship. For Tasmania, it was the premier of the Tasmanian State Premiership that was invited to the Championship – except in 1974, when no state premiership was held and a composite team of players from the premier clubs of the various Tasmanian leagues took part. All games were held in Adelaide, but VFL clubs won every Championship from 1968, except in 1972 when South Australia's North Adelaide Football Club upset Victoria's Carlton Football Club to win by a point.

In 1976, the National Football League abandoned the post-season Championship of Australia concept by establishing the NFL Night Series. It was contested on weekday nights concurrently with the 1976 premiership season by twelve clubs – five from the VFL, four from the SANFL and three from the WAFL – who qualified based on their 1975 positions. It is sometimes seen as a natural extension of the Championship of Australia, although 13 of the 15 games in the series were played in Adelaide which continued to provide the SANFL clubs with an advantage over their VFL and WAFL counterparts.

== Champions by year (1888–1914, 1968–1975) ==
Year	Champion	Colours	Score	Runner-up	Colours	Score	Venue
1888	Norwood		8.12	South Melbourne		4.10	Kensington Oval
1888	Norwood		6.8	South Melbourne		2.11	Kensington Oval
1888	Norwood		6.4	South Melbourne		4.15	Kensington Oval
1890	Port Adelaide		7.10	South Melbourne		6.13	Adelaide Oval
1893	Essendon		10.23	South Adelaide		3.6	Victoria Park
1896	Collingwood		8.5	South Adelaide		6.4	Adelaide Oval
1898	South Adelaide		4.6	Esssendon		1.3	Adelaide Oval
1907	Norwood		13.12 (90)	Carlton		8.10 (58)	Adelaide Oval
1908	West Adelaide		12.9 (81)	Carlton		7.10 (52)	Adelaide Oval
1909	South Melbourne		11.8 (74)	West Adelaide		7.14 (56)	Melbourne Cricket Ground
1910	Port Adelaide		15.20 (110)	Collingwood		7.9 (51)	Adelaide Oval
1911	West Adelaide		8.9 (57)	Essendon		7.12 (54)	Adelaide Oval
1913	Port Adelaide		13.16 (94)	Fitzroy		4.7 (31)	Adelaide Oval
1914	Port Adelaide		9.16 (70)	Carlton		5.6 (36)	Adelaide Oval
1968	Carlton		13.15 (93)	Sturt		6.20 (56)	Adelaide Oval
1969	Richmond		15.27 (117)	Sturt		9.10 (64)	Adelaide Oval
1970	Carlton		21.13 (139)	Sturt		12.22 (94)	Adelaide Oval
1971	Hawthorn		13.13 (91)	North Adelaide		10.7 (67)	Adelaide Oval
1972	North Adelaide		10.13 (73)	Carlton		10.12 (72)	Adelaide Oval
1973	Richmond		12.20 (92)	Subiaco		10.19 (79)	Adelaide Oval
1974	Richmond		27.11 (173)	Sturt		13.17 (95)	Football Park
1975	North Melbourne		17.15 (117)	Norwood		5.11 (41)	Football Park

* Prior to 1897, behinds, although recorded, were not added to a team's score, as whoever kicked more goals won the game. ^ 1896 championship was played in June 1897 owing to the unavailability of the Adelaide Oval in the year prior.

== Most Championships ==
Football Club	Nickname	City/Town	Colours	Titles	Years of Championship Wins
Port Adelaide	Magpies	Adelaide		4	1890, 1910, 1913, 1914
Richmond	Tigers	Melbourne		3	1969, 1973, 1974
Norwood	Redlegs	Adelaide		2	1888, 1907
Carlton	Blues	Melbourne		2	1968, 1970
West Adelaide	Bloods	Adelaide		2	1908, 1911
South Adelaide	Panthers	Adelaide		1	1898
South Melbourne	Swans	Melbourne		1	1909
Collingwood	Magpies	Melbourne		1	1896
Essendon	Bombers	Melbourne		1	1893
North Adelaide	Roosters	Adelaide		1	1972
North Melbourne	Kangaroos	Melbourne		1	1975
Hawthorn	Hawks	Melbourne		1	1971
