= 1911 Championship of Australia =

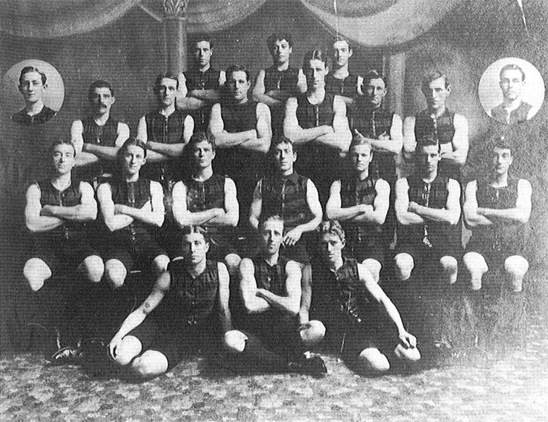
West Adelaide	Essendon
8.9 (57)	7.12 (54)
	1	2	3	4
WAD	1.1 (7)	3.5 (23)	6.5 (41)	8.9 (57)
ESS	2.3 (15)	3.6 (24)	5.10 (40)	7.12 (54)
- Date: 11 October 1911
- Stadium: Adelaide Oval
- Attendance: 6,000

The 1911 Championship of Australia was an Australian rules football match that took place on 11 October 1911.

The championship was contested by the premiers of the VFL, Essendon and the premiers of the SAFL, West Adelaide.

The match was played at Adelaide Oval in Adelaide, South Australia.

The match, played in front of 6,000, was won by West Adelaide by a margin of 3 points, giving West Adelaide its 2nd Championship of Australia Title.

== Match details ==
Championship of Australia
11 October 1911	West Adelaide	def.	Essendon	Adelaide Oval (crowd: 6,000)
1.1 (7); 3.5 (23); 6.5 (41); 8.9 (57)	Q1; Q2; Q3; Final	2.3 (15); 3.6 (24); 5.10 (40); 7.12 (54)	Umpires: Aldersey
A Conlin 3 W Mills 2 W Dowling, J Moy, W Slattery 1	Goals	L Armstrong 3 B Armstrong 2 R Benstead, B Walker 1
