= 1909 Championship of Australia =

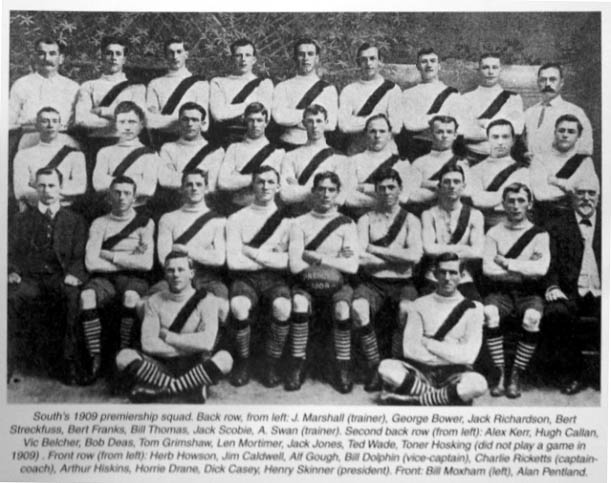
South Melbourne	West Adelaide
11.8 (74)	6.14 (50)
	1	2	3	4
SM	2.2 (14)	5.3 (33)	7.4 (46)	11.8 (74)
WA	1.2 (8)	3.5 (23)	6.9 (45)	6.14 (50)
- Date: 9 October 1909
- Stadium: Melbourne Cricket Ground
- Attendance: 15,000
- Umpires: Bain

The 1909 Championship of Australia was an Australian rules football match that took place on 9 October 1909.

The championship was contested by the premiers of the VFL, South Melbourne and the premiers of the SAFL, West Adelaide.

The match was played at Melbourne Cricket Ground in Melbourne, Victoria.

The match, played in front of 15,000, was won by South Melbourne by a margin of 24 points, giving South Melbourne its 1st Championship of Australia Title.

The West Australian Football League champions, East Fremantle Football Club also travelled to the Eastern States, defeating Port Adelaide in Adelaide but losing to a combined Victorian league side 12.8 (80) to 9.13 (67) in the curtain-raiser to the South Melbourne – West Adelaide game.

== Match details ==
Championship of Australia
9 October 1909	South Melbourne	def.	West Adelaide	Melbourne Cricket Ground (crowd: 15,000)
2.2 (14); 5.3 (33); 7.4 (46); 11.8 (74)	Q1; Q2; Q3; Final	1.2 (8); 3.5 (23); 6.9 (45); 6.14 (50)	Umpires: Bain
