= 1896 Championship of Australia =

South Adelaide	Collingwood
6.4	8.5
	1	2	3	4
SA	3.1	3.2	5.3	6.4
COL	2.2	4.3	6.5	8.5
- Date: 12 June 1897
- Stadium: Adelaide Oval
- Attendance: 5000-6000
- Umpires: Coffee

The 1896 Championship of Australia was an Australian rules football match that took place on 12 June 1897.

The championship was contested by the 1896 premiers of the VFA Collingwood and South Adelaide the current premiers of the SAFA.

The match was played at the Adelaide Oval in Adelaide, South Australia with a ball specially made by Mr. Sherrin from Melbourne who was in Adelaide with the Collingwood team.

This was the last Championship of Australia match to be held until the 1907 Championship of Australia.

== Background on Teams ==
Collingwood had defeated South Melbourne in a playoff for the VFA 1896 Premiership after both clubs had finished level on points. The VFA split at the end of the 1896 season when the leading eight clubs formed the Victorian Football League now Australian Football League in 1897.

South Adelaide were the dominant team in South Australia during the 1890s winning six SAFA premierships in eight seasons between 1892 and 1899. They won four out of the last five premierships in the SAFA - 1892, 1893, 1895 and 1896 and were runner up in 1894, after losing a grand final replay to Norwood, prior to the game against Collingwood. They would win a further two SAFA premierships in 1898 and 1899 after finishing second in 1897. Their dominance would end in 1900 after another second place.
