= 1914 Championship of Australia =

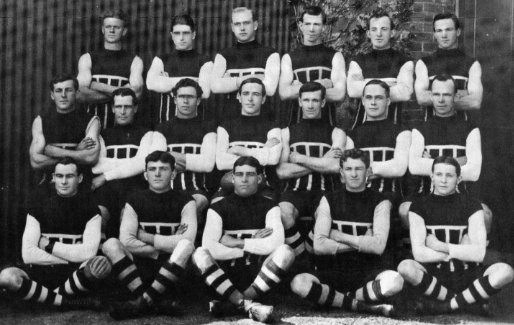
Port Adelaide	Carlton
9.16 (70)	5.6 (36)
	1	2	3	4
PTA	2.4 (16)	5.6 (36)	6.9 (45)	9.16 (70)
CAR	1.3 (9)	3.4 (22)	4.4 (28)	5.6 (36)
- Date: Saturday, 3 October
- Stadium: Adelaide Oval
- Attendance: 5,000

Accolades
- Australian Football Hall of Fame: 1. Rod McGregor (1996)

The 1914 Championship of Australia was an Australian rules football match that took place on 3 October 1914. The championship was contested by the premiers of the VFL, Carlton and the premiers of the SAFL, Port Adelaide. The match was played at Adelaide Oval in Adelaide, South Australia. The match, played in front of 5,000, was won by Port Adelaide by a margin of 34 points, giving Port Adelaide its record 4th Championship of Australia Title. This was the last Championship of Australia match to be held until 1968.

== Teams ==
Port Adelaide were without the services of Ashley, Dunn and Cocks with their respective places taken by Wisdom, Middleton and Lincoln respectively.

Port Adelaide
B:	William Boon	Horace Pope	Alex McFarlane
HB:	Jack Londrigan (c)	John W. Robertson	Henry Eaton
C:	Cuthbert Lincoln	Harold Oliver (vc)	Sampson Hosking
HF:	Joseph Watson	Frank Magor	Albert Chaplin
F:	Charles Andersen	Joseph Middleton	Angelo Congear
Foll:	Alan Maynard	Leonard Wisdom	William Drummond
Coach:	Jack Londrigan		

Carlton
B:	Paddy O'Brien	Joe Andrews	Harry Haughton (c)
HB:	Steve Leehane	Dan Keily	Andy McDonald
C:	Alf Baud	Rod McGregor	Ted Brown
HF:	Jack Lowe	Andy O'Donnell	Stanley McKenzie
F:	Charlie Fisher	Athol Sharp	Percy Daykin
Foll:	George Calwell	George Topping	Jimmy Morris
Coach:	Norm Clark		

== Scorecard ==
Championship of Australia
Wednesday, 3 October 1914	Port Adelaide	def.	Carlton	Adelaide Oval (crowd: 5,000)
2.4 (16); 5.6 (36); 6.9 (45); 9.16 (70)	Q1; Q2; Q3; Final	1.3 (9); 3.3 (21); 4.4 (28); 5.6 (36)	Umpires: O'Connor
A Congear 4 J Watson 2 A Chaplin, W Drummond, L Wisdom 1	Goals	S McKenzie 2 A Baud, J Morris, A Sharp 1
