= 1971 Championship of Australia =

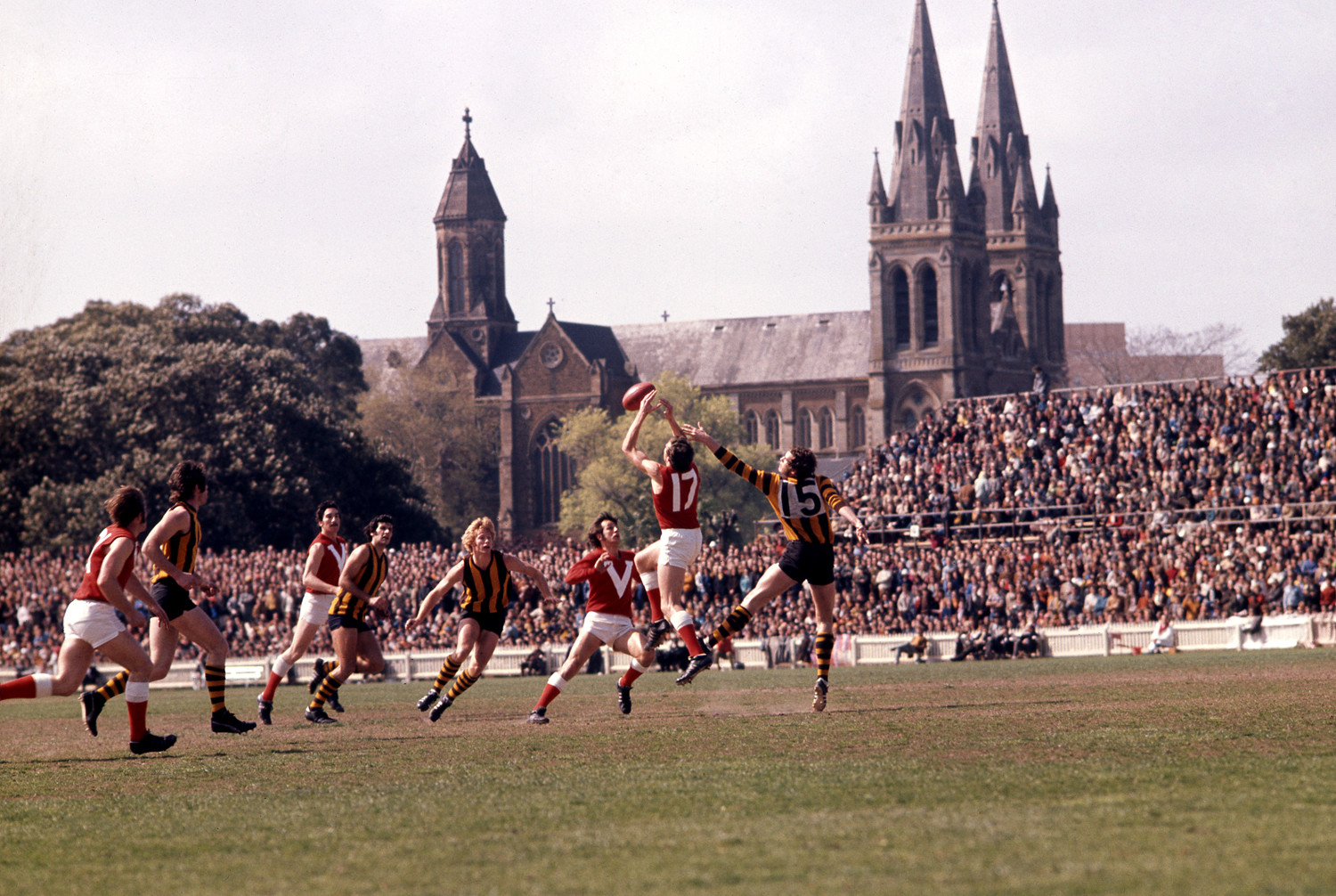
Hawthorn	North Adelaide
13.13 (91)	10.7 (67)
	1	2	3	4
HAW	2.5 (17)	5.6 (36)	8.10 (58)	13.13 (91)
NAD	3.0 (18)	4.1 (25)	7.3 (45)	10.7 (67)
- Date: 2 October 1971
- Stadium: Adelaide Oval
- Attendance: 37,149
- Umpires: William Deller

The 1971 Championship of Australia was the 15th edition of the Championship of Australia, an ANFC-organised national club Australian rules football match between the champion clubs from the VFL and the SANFL.

This was the last Championship of Australia title to be held as a single game before the competition was expanded the following year into a knockout tournament that included the champions of the WANFL and the Tasmanian State Premiership.

== Qualified teams ==
Team	Nickname	League	Qualification	Participation (bold indicates winners)
Hawthorn	Hawks	VFL	Winners of the 1971 Victorian Football League	1st
North Adelaide	Roosters	SANFL	Winners of the 1971 South Australian National Football League	1st

== Venue ==
- Adelaide Oval (Capacity: **64,000**)

== Match details ==
=== Championship of Australia ===
2 October 1971	**Hawthorn**	**91-67**	**North Adelaide**	Adelaide Oval, Adelaide
	2.5 (17); 5.6 (36); 8.10 (58); 13.13 (91)	Report	3.0 (18); 4.1 (25); 7.3 (45); 10.7 (67)	Attendance: 37,149; Umpires: William Deller
		**Goals**
	L Matthews, B Keddie 4 P Hudson 2 A Martello, D Scott, M Moncrieff 1		N Sachse 4 A Rebbeck 2 B Robran, T von Bertouch, T Collins, K Francou 1
