= 1893 Championship of Australia =

1893 Australian rules football match

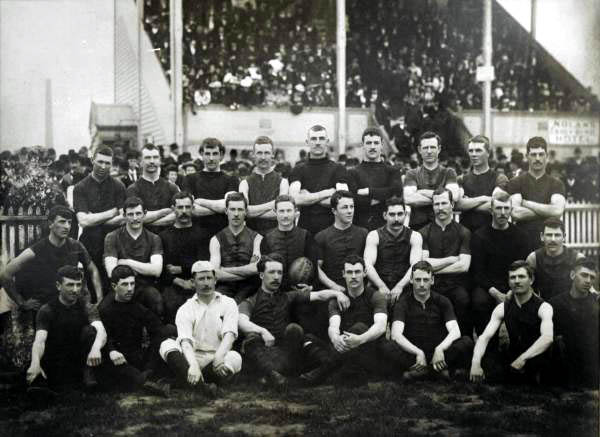
Essendon	South Adelaide
10.23	3.6
- Date: 7 October 1893
- Stadium: Victoria Park, Melbourne

The 1893 Championship of Australia was an Australian rules football match that took place on 7 October 1893.

The championship was contested by the premiers of the VFA, Essendon and the premiers of the SAFA, South Adelaide.

The match was played at Victoria Park in Melbourne, Victoria.

The match, played in front of 12,000, was won by Essendon by a margin of 7 goals, giving Essendon its 1st Championship of Australia Title.

== Match details ==
Championship of Australia
7 October 1893	Essendon	def.	South Adelaide	Victoria Park (crowd: 8,000)
1.5; 3.13; 6.18; 10.23	Q1; Q2; Q3; Final	1.1; 1.2; 3.5; 3.6	Umpires: J Trait
A Thurgood 4 P Watson 2 A Hall, C Campbell, C Forbes, Parsons 1	Goals	Fisher, F.Hill, McGaffin 1
