= 1890 Championship of Australia =

1890 Australian rules football match

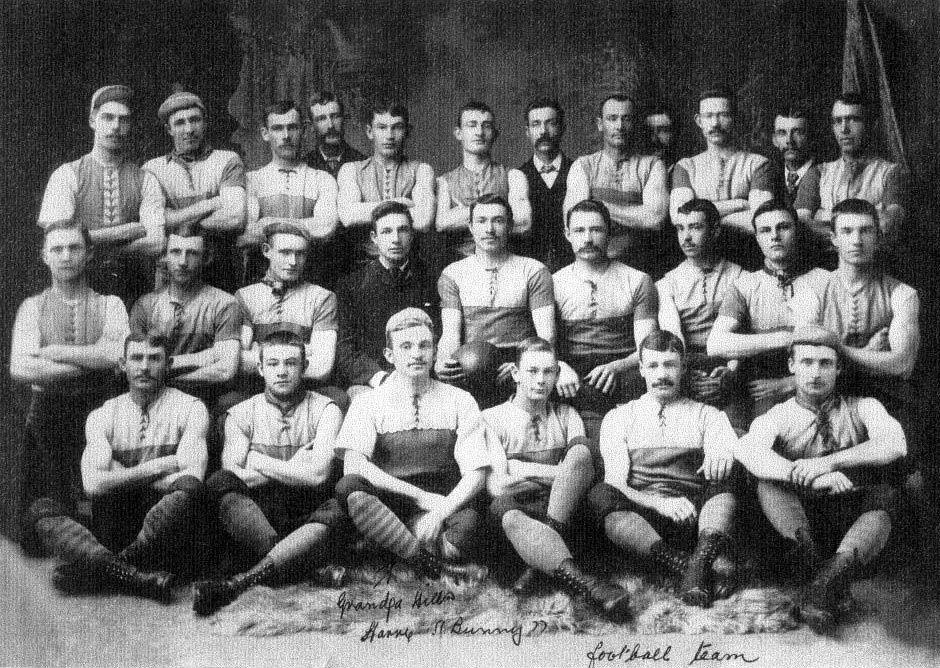
Port Adelaide	South Melbourne
7.10	6.13
- Date: 4 October 1890
- Stadium: Adelaide Oval

The 1890 Championship of Australia was an Australian rules football match that took place on 4 October 1890.

The championship was contested by the premiers of the VFA, South Melbourne and the premiers of the SAFA, Port Adelaide.

The match was played at Adelaide Oval in Adelaide, South Australia.

The match, played in front of 6,500, was won by Port Adelaide by a margin of 1 goal, giving Port Adelaide its 1st Championship of Australia Title.

== Match details ==
Championship of Australia
4 October 1890	Port Adelaide	def.	South Melbourne	Adelaide Oval (crowd: 6,500)
1.0; 3.4; 6.6; 7.10	Q1; Q2; Q3; Final	1.8; 4.10; 6.12; 6.13	Umpires: J Trait
