= 1907 Championship of Australia =

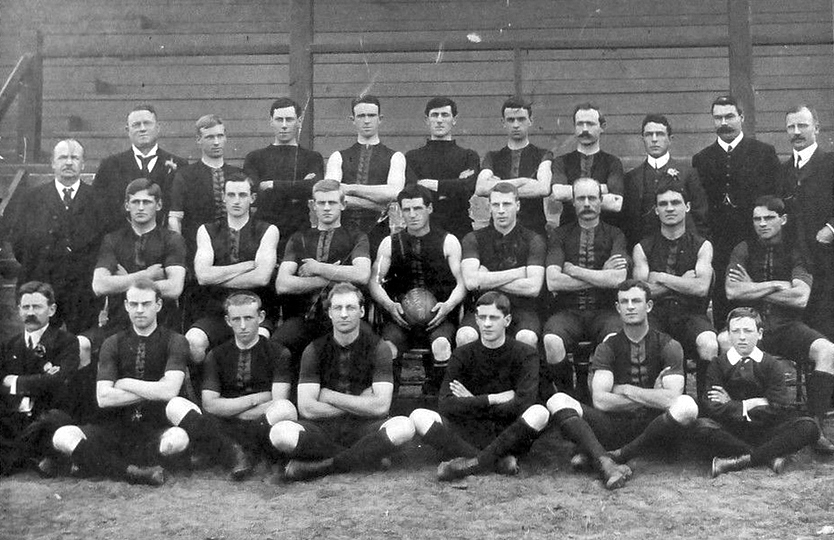
Norwood	Carlton
13.12 (90)	8.10 (58)
	1	2	3	4
NOR	1.7 (8)	3.8 (26)	10.11 (71)	13.12 (90)
CAR	2.1 (13)	3.5 (23)	3.6 (24)	8.10 (58)
- Date: 28 September 1907
- Stadium: Adelaide Oval
- Attendance: 13000
- Umpires: Tullach

The 1907 Championship of Australia was an Australian rules football match that took place on 28 September 1907 at the Adelaide Oval in Adelaide, South Australia. It was the fourth edition of the Championship of Australia with it being the first since the 1896 edition, also in Adelaide.

The championship was contested by the premiers of the VFL (Carlton) and the premiers of the SAFL (Norwood) in one match which was played in a front of a crowd of 13,000. After a slow start which featured only three goals, Norwood would go to win the match by 32 points with Leonard Chamberlain scoring five goals as Norwood won their second title.

Future Premier of South Australia Lionel Hill and South Australian Attorney-General Shirley Jeffries were members of the victorious Norwood side.

== Background ==
The Championship of Australia began in 1888 as a three-game series between the VFA champions at the time (South Melbourne) and the SAFA champions in Norwood with Norwood winning the series 3–0. This would be the only Championship of Australia to be played as a series, with the following three editions (1890, 1893 and 1896) all being played as one game matches with the Victorian teams winning two of those matches.

Norwood qualified through to the Championship of Australia by taking out the South Australian Football League on 21 September 1907. They defeated Port Adelaide by 28 points (8.7 to 3.9) in a crowd of 26,000 people which was a South Australian record. Bahr, E. Lewis and W.R. Miller scored two goals for Norwood. Also in the same game, Carlton qualified through to the final by defeating South Melbourne at the Melbourne Cricket Ground. In front of a crowd of over 45,000 people, Carlton would win by 5 points (6.14 to 6.9) to record their second premiership.

== Match ==
=== Summary ===
The match was 13,000 which also included the governor, George Le Hunte and his lady. After two points were scored in the opening minutes, the opening goal of the match came from C Gwynne from an assist of E Lewis. Carlton responded with goals from George Topping and Alex Lang brought the score levels at quarter time. The second quarter was a tight hustle with the balance of play being even until halftime, with Norwood being slightly ahead at the break (3 points) with scores being 3.8 to 3.5.

The second half saw the home team raise their confidence in what The Argus described as a huge surprise with the first three minutes of the third quarter seeing three goals to the host side. The dominance of the Norwood centre showed with the ball only passing the centre line, three or four times for a single point after the bell for Carlton, while Norwood in response scored seven goals. After Norwood scored an early goal at the start of the last quarter, Fred Jinks delivered Carlton's first goal in two quarters, to generous cheers through the crowd. Carlton would go on to score four more goals to win the final quarter and reduce the final margin to only 32 points.

=== Result ===
Championship of Australia
28 September 1907	Norwood	def.	Carlton	Adelaide Oval (crowd: 12,000)
1.7 (13); 3.8 (26); 10.11 (71); 13.12 (90)	Q1; Q2; Q3; Final	2.1 (13); 3.5 (23); 3.6 (24); 8.10 (58)	Umpires: Tullach
L Chamberlain 5 R Townsend 4 P Newland 2 C Gwynne, E Lewis 1	Goals	A Lang, H Kelly, M Grace 2 G Topping, F Jinks 1
