= 1908 Championship of Australia =

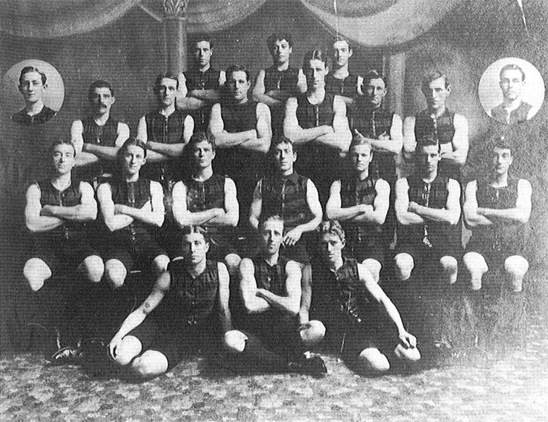
West Adelaide	Carlton
12.9 (81)	7.10 (52)
	1	2	3	4
WA	2.3 (15)	7.4 (46)	9.5 (59)	12.9 (81)
CAR	2.1 (13)	3.2 (20)	7.7 (49)	7.10 (59)
- Date: 3 October 1908
- Stadium: Adelaide Oval
- Attendance: 13,000
- Umpires: A Hickey

The 1908 Championship of Australia was an Australian rules football match that took place on 3 October 1908 at the Adelaide Oval in Adelaide, South Australia. It was the fifth edition of the Championship of Australia and the second since it came back the year prior.

The championship was contested by the premiers of the VFL, Carlton and the premiers of the SAFL, West Adelaide in a single match played in front of 13,000, was won by West Adelaide by a margin of 29 points, giving West Adelaide its first Championship of Australia title.

== Match details ==
Championship of Australia
3 October 1908	West Adelaide	def.	Carlton	Adelaide Oval (crowd: 13,000)
2.3 (15); 7.4 (46); 9.5 (59); 12.9 (81)	Q1; Q2; Q3; Final	2.1 (13); 3.2 (20); 7.7 (49); 7.10 (52)	Umpires: A Hickey
J McCarthy 5 W Dowling, W Price 2 J Daly, T Leahy, T Moore 1	Goals	V Gardiner, F Elliott 2 H Kelly, J Flynn, R McGregor 1
