= Sampson Hosking =

Australian rules footballer (1888–1974)

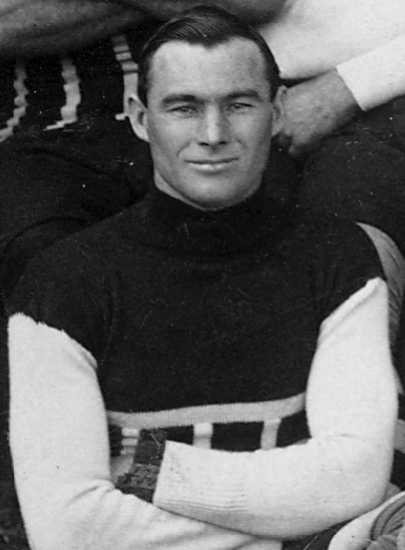
- Hosking in 1914

Personal information
- Full name: Sampson Hosking
- Nickname: Shine
- Born: 4 January 1888; Glanville, South Australia
- Died: 20 October 1974 (aged 86); Adelaide, South Australia
- Original team: Semaphore Centrals
- Height: 167 cm (5 ft 6 in)
- Weight: 64 kg (141 lb)
- Positions: Centre, rover, wing, forward

Playing career^{1}
Years	Club	Games (Goals)
1907–1921; 1927; 1936	Port Adelaide	163 (41)
1916–18	Port Adelaide (Patriotic)	~ 31 (0)

Representative team honours
Years	Team	Games (Goals)
1911–1912; 1919–1920	South Australia	10

Coaching career
Years	Club	Games (W–L–D)
1921	Port Adelaide	
1922–1924	West Adelaide	
1926	South Adelaide	
1927–1931	Port Adelaide	
1932–1934	West Torrens	
1936–1938	Port Adelaide	
1939–1940	West Torrens	
1942–1943	Port/Torrens (WWII)	
- ^{1} Playing statistics correct to the end of 1936.

Career highlights
- Club: 3× Championship of Australia player (1910, 1913, 1914); 4× Port Adelaide SANFL premiership player (1910, 1913, 1914, 1921); 2× Port Adelaide SAPFL premiership player (1916, 1917); Port Adelaide best and fairest (1910); Port Adelaide life member (1919); Port Adelaide captain (1912); Port Adelaide most improved junior (1907); Coach: 6× SANFL premiership coach (1921, 1928, 1933, 1936, 1937, 1942); Honours: 2× Magarey Medallist (1910, 1915); SAPFL best player (1916); South Australian Football Hall of Fame (2002)

Sampson Hosking (4 January 1888 – 20 October 1974) was an Australian rules footballer who played for the Port Adelaide Football Club in the South Australian Football League (SAFL). He was twice a recipient of the Magarey Medal, an individual award given in recognition of being the best and fairest player in the SAFL. After his playing career Hosking was also an accomplished football coach successfully leading Port Adelaide and the West Torrens Football Club to a combined six premierships. In 1929 he was described in the Register as "one of the most prominent figures in the game during the past 20 years. Combining exceptional pace with a football brain of rare fertility".

== Early life ==
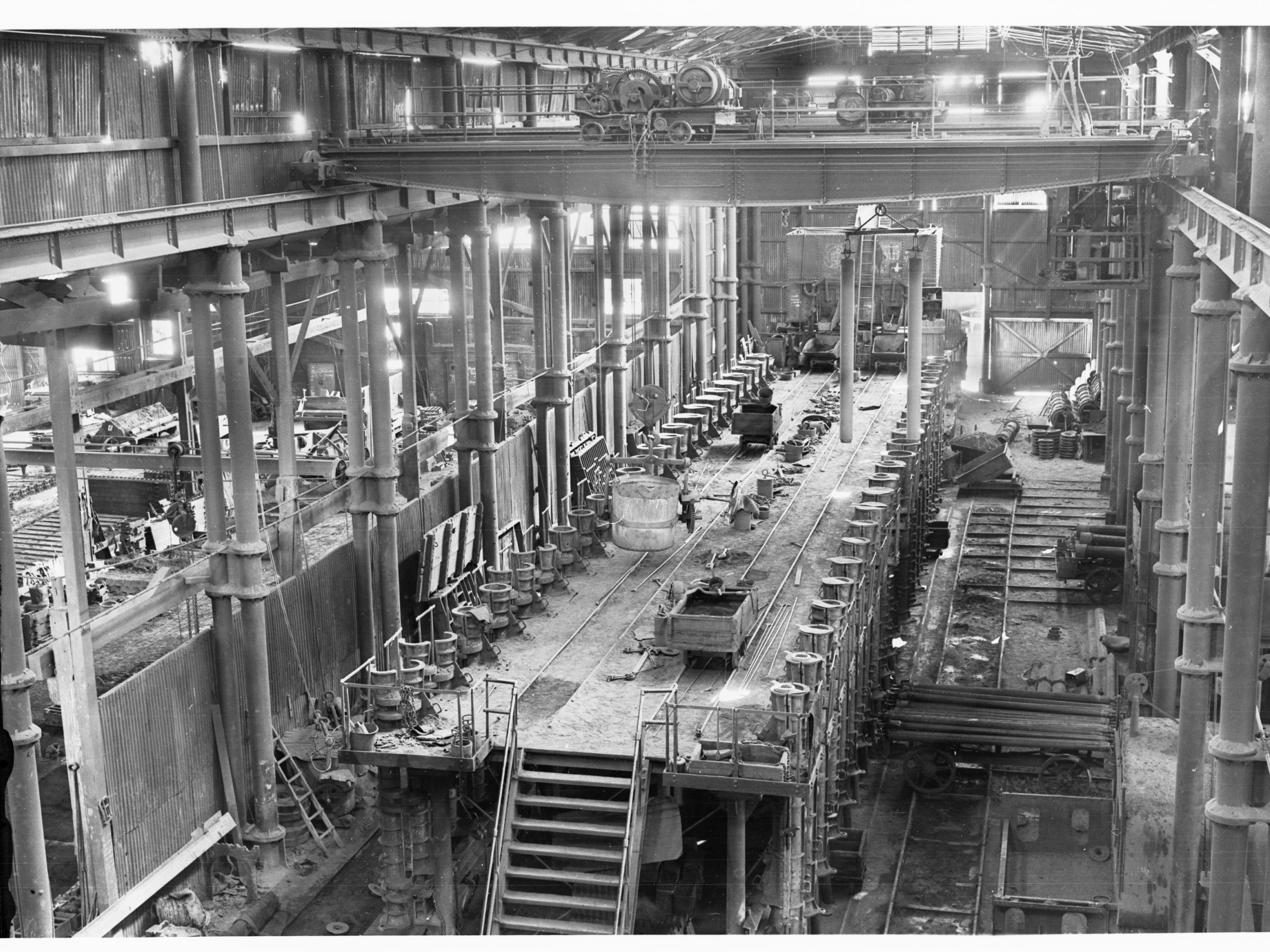
Hosking began working at the Glanville Pipe Works (pictured) around the turn of the century

Hosking was born on 4 January 1888 in Glanville, South Australia. He was the son of Cornish immigrant James Hosking and Port Adelaide local Jane Hampton McKenzie. Hosking grew up near the Port River, living in Exmouth Street, Glanville.

For his education Hosking went to the Le Fevre Peninsula School. Around the age of twelve Hosking started working at the Glanville Pipe Works, alongside other family members, where he remained employed for 52 years.

Hosking wearing his Semaphore Centrals uniform in 1906

When Hosking was very young he dislocated his left elbow, leading his father James, out of an abundance of caution, to rule that his son should never play football. To circumvent his father's ruling and ire, when Hosking played junior football with the Marist Brothers, and later the Semaphore Centrals, he did so under a false name. The pseudonym that Hosking used during these early years was H. Sampson. During his time at Semaphore Centrals his teammates often joked "who is this H. Sampson anyway?" and that "he is picked but never turns up!". Hosking was part of the Semaphore Centrals team that lost the Adelaide and Suburban Football Association Grand Final to the Norwood Seconds in 1906. Whilst at Semaphore Centrals Hosking purchased a short-brimmed hat, similar to that worn by an Adelaide comedian at the time known as Harry Shine, and was subsequently given the nickname "Shine" by his friends.

Around this time Hosking was working alongside Tom Leahy who was already a league footballer and was trying to convince his younger co-worker to join him at his then club, West Adelaide. Hosking did not tell his father about his football exploits until he was formally invited to play with Port Adelaide in 1907. His father's caution was not unfounded as Hosking suffered shoulder injuries throughout his entire football career. Whenever he played football Hosking preferred to wear a long-sleeved guernsey to hide his permanently taped left shoulder from opponents.

== Playing career ==
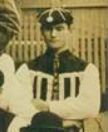
Hosking in his debut SAFL season (1907)

Hosking made his senior debut for Port Adelaide in a win over Sturt on Unley Oval on 4 May 1907. A couple weeks later during a game Lewis Corston, Port Adelaide's captain, physically kicked Hosking telling him to work harder and threatened him with being dropped from the side if he did not "get into the game a bit more". This confrontation proved a lasting one in the memory of Hosking, who years later, recalled it as formative. In his first season of league football Hosking played in the 1907 SAFL Grand Final against Port Adelaide's traditional rival Norwood. That match was attended by a then-record crowd for football in South Australia with 25,000 spectators present at Adelaide Oval to witness Norwood win by 28 points. Hosking was given a gold medal by Port Adelaide in recognition of being the "most improved junior" for his club in 1907.

Hosking was named as one of Port Adelaide's best players in a 1908 post-season game against Essendon on Adelaide Oval of which the visitors won by one goal.

The third game of Port Adelaide's 1909 SAFL season against Norwood was severely effected by rain and wind with only one goal scored, by Hosking, for the whole match, a goal which Roy Hill described as a "fluke". On 19 July 1909 whilst at work Hosking was badly injured when a ladle of hot metal spilled on his legs and feet. He was severely burned. The injury prevented Hosking joining Port Adelaide's mid-season trip to Melbourne. Hosking had recovered enough by the time the club returned from Victoria to take his place back in the side when they faced Sturt on 21 August. Port Adelaide qualified for the 1909 SAFL Grand Final and by this stage Hosking had largely recovered from his work injury and was playing relatively well, kicking a goal during the match, but it was not enough, with West Adelaide winning the premiership decider by 18 points.

As a result of Lewis Corston retiring at the end of 1909, Hosking was given his role as Port Adelaide's centre for the 1910 SAFA season. It was during this season that Hosking won his first Magarey Medal, and his first South Australian league premiership as a player when Port Adelaide defeated Sturt (who were playing in their first championship match) by 19 points in the 1910 SAFL Grand Final. Hosking took part in an eventful post season with Port Adelaide in 1910 during which his club defeated Collingwood for the 1910 Championship of Australia title, and Western Australian Football League (WAFL) premiers East Fremantle in an exhibition match. Hosking and Port Adelaide also defeated a combination of some of the WAFL's best players in another match that year.

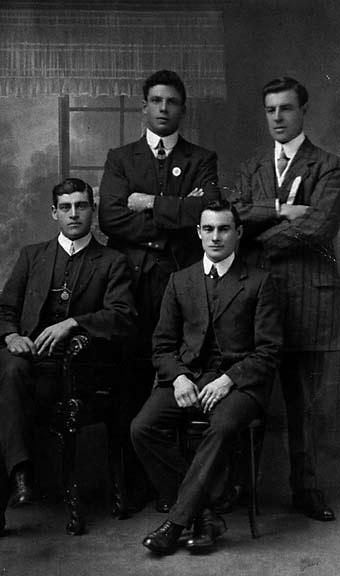
Port Adelaide's 1911 State Representatives: Angelo Congear, Harold Oliver, Hosking (seated right) and Frank Hansen

In 1911 Hosking was selected to represent South Australia for the first time. This coincided with the national championship carnival being held in Adelaide that year. The 1911 South Australian team proved to be the strongest the state had ever fielded to that point. In the carnival South Australia won all four of its matches against New South Wales, Tasmania, Western Australia and Victoria.

In June 1912 Hosking was elected captain of the club by his teammates at Port Adelaide after Clifford Cocks stepped down from the role. Port Adelaide went undefeated during the minor round that year, but stumbled at the final hurdle losing the 1912 SAFL Grand Final to West Adelaide by 14 points.

At the start of the 1913 SAFL season Hosking vacated the Port Adelaide captaincy. During July Port Adelaide played a combination of players from the WAFL with Hosking's side winning by 39 points. During the match Hosking went head-to-head with William "Nipper" Truscott with the Fremantle Herald observing that "Shine Hosking's work in the centre quite eclipsed our own Nipper". The season proved to be more successful for Port Adelaide beginning with an undefeated run halfway through the minor round all the way to the end of the 1913 SAFL Grand Final where the club beat North Adelaide by 14 points to claim the club's 7th premiership. In the post season Port Adelaide successfully challenged 1913 VFL premiers Fitzroy for the title of Champions of Australia.

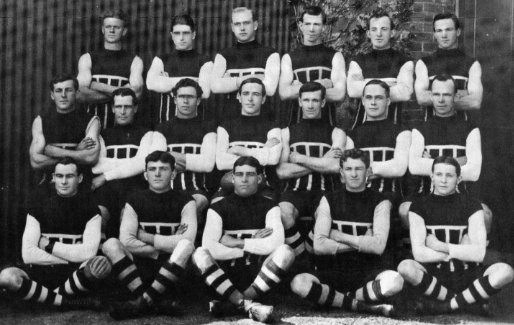
Hosking was a member of Port Adelaide's undefeated 1914 side that also beat VFL premiers Carlton and the South Australian State team. He is pictured sitting at the bottom left.

Port Adelaide repeated its successes of 1913 and improved on them. Hosking played his 100th SAFL game in the 1914 SAFL Grand Final where Port Adelaide held North Adelaide to a single goal. Again, Port Adelaide successfully challenged the VFL premiers, this time Carlton, for the title of 1914 Champions of Australia. Additionally, in conjunction with Eight Hours Day a match between Port Adelaide and South Australia was held on Jubilee Oval with Hosking's team toppling a start side featuring some of the state's best players such as Dave Lowe, Bill Mayman, Tom Leahy, Jack Tredrea, Frank Golding and Frank Barry.

At the end of the 1915 SAFL season, Hosking tied with Frank Barry and Charlie Perry for the Magarey Medal. At the time a count back was used to determine a single winner with the award being presented to Frank Barry at the time. However, in 1998 the SANFL issued retrospective Magarey Medals in the 10 instances where there was a tie. As a result, Hosking is one of only three players to win multiple Magarey Medals for Port Adelaide with the others being Bob Quinn and Russell Ebert.

During World War I the SAFL ceased scheduling football matches which led to some club officials, particularly those at Port Adelaide, to form the South Australian Patriotic Football League (SAPFL) which ran an independent competition in 1916, 1917 and 1918. Hosking played a majority of games in all three of the SAPFL seasons. After playing a dominant game in Port Adelaide's 1916 SAPFL Grand Final victory, the South Australian Register noted that Hosking was "entitled to be recognised as the best player of the season in the association". These games were never recognised by the SAFL.

Despite having retired from playing after 1921, he played two matches in 1927, and in 1936 he became the oldest SANFL player when, at the age of 48 years and 154 days whilst Port Adelaide coach, he named himself on the bench in his side against West Torrens.

=== Playing style ===
Hosking (right) standing next to Vic Cumberland (left) of Sturt on Adelaide Oval before the 1910 SAFL Grand Final

Hosking was a fast aggressive centreman. During his career he also played as a rover, wingman and forward. Hosking often elected to knock on the ball when he found himself in congestion. In regards to when he trained Hosking said that "I always put my whole heart and soul into my work. Running up to the ball I would run my hardest, and when I picked it up there would always be an imaginary opponent in front of me. They used to say at the Port:—'Look at that lunatic out there, dodging and twisting past nothing!".

He was noted for being the fastest player in Port Adelaide's team and one of the fastest in the SAFL. When he was unavailable to play the lack of pace in the Port Adelaide side was said to be noticeable. In 1908 at a Semaphore Athletics Carnival that was held to celebrate King Edward's birthday Hosking won three events, those being 130 yards (118.87 m), 220 yards (201.17 m) and 440 yards (402.34 m). In 1910 and 1912 Hosking won races at the Adelaide St Patrick's Day running events. Just a few days before he turned 37 he entered a 400m event at the Patawalonga winning his heats and coming second in the final.

Hosking was also considered to possess remarkable judgement as a footballer. When describing Hosking in writing for the Register, Steve McKee stated that "Shine Hosking stands out as one of the most prominent figures in the game during the past 20 years. Combining exceptional pace with a football brain of rare fertility...he was successively a star winger and centre". Bob McLean described Hosking in his book 100 Years with the Magpies as possessing "brilliance as a ball handler, his lightening speed and all-round skill...A centreline player, he played mainly in the centre or on the wing. He held his own against all-comers, not only in South Australia, but in the many Interstate and Carnival matches in which he participated."

Hosking relished being booed by fans of opposition clubs interpreting the verbals "as a compliment. It reminded me of the villain in the play". Despite winning two Magarey Medals, of which a criterion of eligibility is fairness, Hosking described himself as having a "reputation of being one of the dirtiest players who ever stripped."

== Coaching career ==
Cartoon of Hosking appearing in the Daily Herald in 1921, the first year Hosking was coach of Port Adelaide, accompanied by the label "BRILLIANT SHINE"

In 1921 Hosking became Port Adelaide's captain in charge of training during his final full season as a player. Hosking was originally elected as captain of Port Adelaide on 9 March 1921 at the club's annual general meeting. However, on 7 May 1921 the captaincy was given to Harold Oliver, with Hosking being given the vice captaincy. This was after Oliver committed to travel to and from his farm in Berri for matches for the whole 1921 SAFL season. On 13 May 1921 a Daily Herald article described Hosking as "a most useful coach to his team, always giving juniors and new players encouragement". That year Port Adelaide beat Norwood by 8 points in the 1921 SAFL Grand Final. In the 1921 Port Adelaide Football Club Annual Report, Hosking is listed as one of only three players to attend all 44 of the club's training sessions that season (the other two being Clem Maywald and Kenneth Slade).

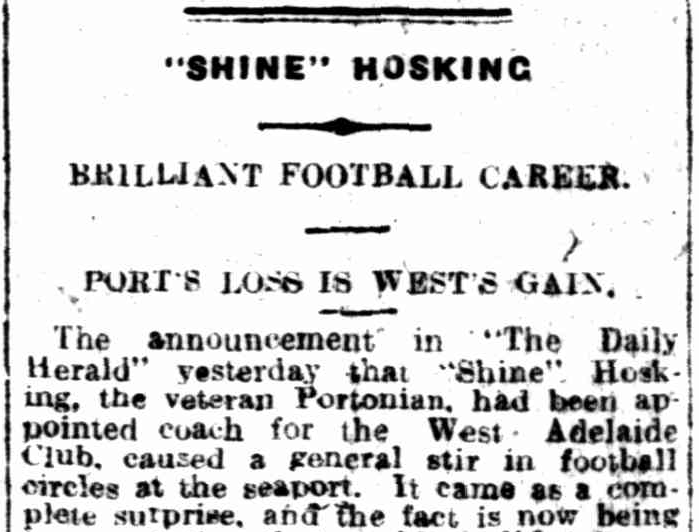
The Daily Herald discussing the impact that the news of Hosking's move to West Adelaide as coach had in Port Adelaide

On 18 May 1922 the Daily Herald broke the news that Hosking had been poached away from Port Adelaide to be the new coach of West Adelaide on the recommendations of the latter club's captain Vic Peters. At the time the news of Hosking's "defection" caused a stir amongst football followers in Port Adelaide. In Hosking's first season at the helm of West Adelaide he guided that club to the 1922 SAFL Grand Final where they faced a Norwood side coached by Tom Leahy in front of 31,000 spectators at Adelaide Oval. Despite West Adelaide proving competitive in the contest wayward kicking let them down losing to Norwood 9.7 (61) to 2.1 (28). In October Hosking took his West Adelaide side to Perth to play WAFL premiers East Perth on Leederville Oval. In that match East Perth beat West Adelaide by 24 points.

During the 1924 season there were reports that the West Adelaide players were not putting in full effort at training, cutting their training sessions short along with failing to follow the instructions of their coach. By the end of 1924 Hosking had become frustrated with the level of commitment displayed by his West Adelaide players, voicing his disappointment in The News. He did not continue as West Adelaide's coach in 1925.

In 1926 the South Adelaide Football Club appointed Hosking as coach. It proved to be a difficult year for Hosking who immediately had to deal with the retirement of South Adelaide legend Dan Moriarty along with the defection of Charles Daly who was poached by Norwood. Hosking was left with only Bill Oliver, Alf Ryan and Bill Jackson as the experienced league players in his squad, subsequently forcing Hosking to give league debuts a large number of juniors in order to field a full team for South Adelaide. The club's best result for the season under Hosking was a draw against West Torrens on Adelaide Oval.

Hosking returned to his junior club Semaphore Central as coach at the start of 1927. Halfway through the 1927 SAFL season Hosking was appointed to take over from Peter Bampton as Port Adelaide's coach. His first training session as coach for Port Adelaide that year occurred on 2 August. The following season Hosking guided the club to victory in the 1928 SANFL Grand Final, Port Adelaide's first premiership since his departure at the end of 1921. During that year he also coached Port Adelaide's reserves side and Semaphore Centrals on Alberton Oval.

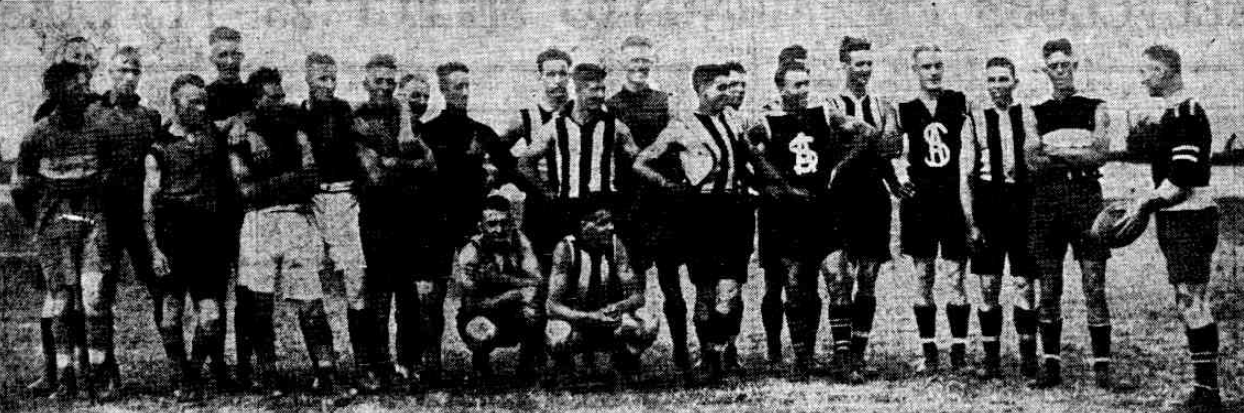
Hosking (far right) instructing his players at training as Port Adelaide coach on Alberton Oval in 1928

In 1929 Drozena Eden, a local of Mauritian descent, was invited after partaking in Port Adelaide's pre-season to remain with club's senior team. At the start of 1930 Fred Ward, a club official, stated that "the success of Port Adelaide during the last two years was due almost entirely to the coaching of Hosking".

During the 1932 pre-season Port Adelaide elected to appoint a playing coach rather than a stand-alone coach resulting in Hosking being replaced by Sydney Ween. This decision may have been made on financial grounds with a long running internal debate, led by R. Lowe, within the club's administration regarding whether the cost associated with a paid coach, as opposed to just using the captain, was justifiable. Fred Ward held the opposing view considering a non-playing coach preferable. Hosking's absence from coaching only lasted a few months as he seize an opportunity to take over the role as West Torrens coach from D.R. Manning on 5 July 1932. An improved style of play by the West Torrens under Hosking was noted within a month of him becoming coach.

In Hosking's first full year as coach of West Torrens he successfully guided that club to the 1933 SANFL Grand Final where they beat Norwood by 23 points. After the Grand Final Magarey Medallist Jim Handby was full of praise when it came to Hosking's coaching writing in the Adelaide Advertiser that "this blending of skill, vigor and football intelligence has placed Torrens in its present very satisfactory position. Torrens's football brains have probably been developed by the shrewd attention paid to the players' education in this regard by 'Shine' Hosking, the coach. There is not much that 'Shine' does not know in this phase of football, and a further tribute is due to him for the superbly-trained condition of the Torrens players."

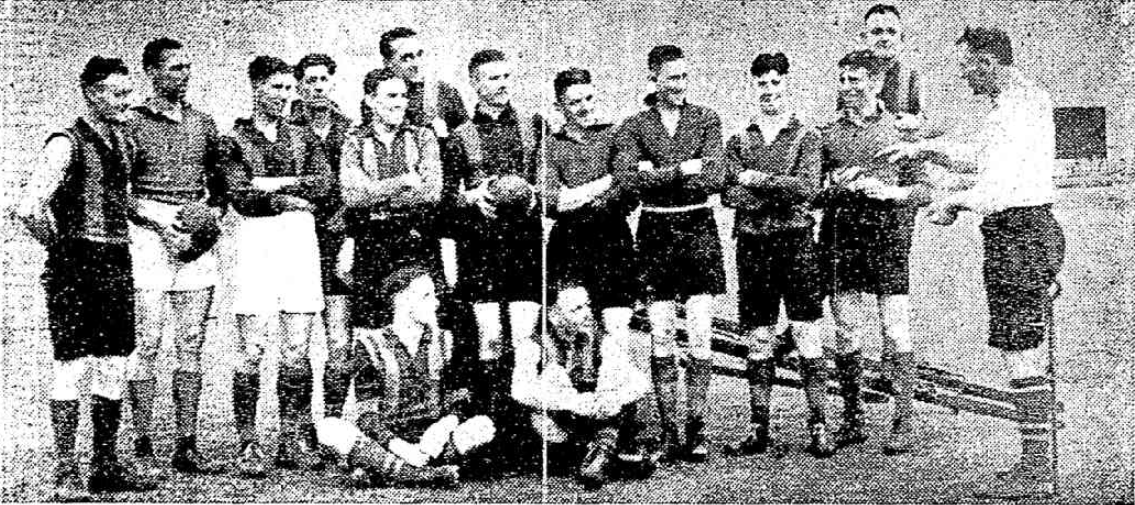
Hosking (far right) talking to his West Torrens players at the club's final training session before the 1933 SANFL Grand Final

In 1934 Hosking was simultaneously made the coach of both West Torrens junior and league teams meaning he was required at Thebarton Oval four nights a week. During that season Hosking and West Torrens travelled to Tasmania to play a match against a composite TANFL side.

In 1935 Edward Foote took over from Hosking as league coach of West Torrens. During that year Hosking took part in a charity match as a player between old time players and current SAJC jockeys in Glenelg.

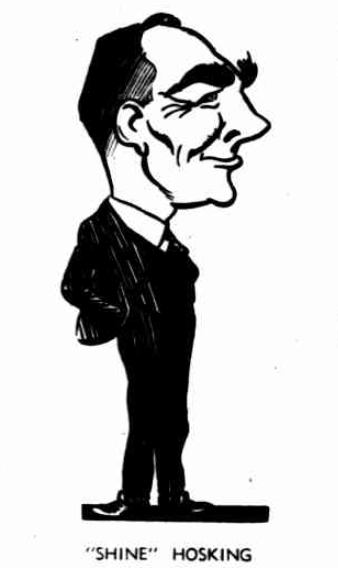
Caricature of Hosking that appeared in The News on 20 April 1937

On 1 January 1936 it was revealed by The News that West Torrens had secured Len Ashby as its coach for the upcoming season thereby creating a void at Alberton leading to speculation that Hosking might return to Port Adelaide for a third time. Vic Johnson was also considered for the Port Adelaide coaching job in 1936 but his contract with South Adelaide made this impossible. The speculation proved correct with Hosking returning to Port Adelaide as coach in 1936 where he immediately had to deal with the retirement of club captain Bob Johnson. That year he succeeded in coaching Port Adelaide to a narrow three-point win over Sturt in the 1936 SANFL Grand Final.

For the 1937 SANFL season one of Hosking's first tasks was to find a player to play the role of full forward James Prideaux who retired at the end of the previous season having kicked 86 goals. Hosking claimed consecutive premierships as coach for the first time when Port Adelaide defeated South Adelaide by 24 points in the 1937 SANFL Grand Final. In that match Hosking directed his players to spread the goal-kicking amongst the team resulting in eight individual goal kickers.

Hosking stood down as Port Adelaide coach at the end of 1938 to allow Bob Quinn to become that club's captain-coach for the 1939 SANFL Season.

In 1939 Hosking returned to West Torrens as head coach. That year Hosking took West Torrens to the 1939 SANFL Grand Final where they lost to Port Adelaide by 47 points.

At the start of the 1940 SANFL season Hosking voiced his optimism praising the players he had at his disposal. Round seven of that season saw West Torrens dramatically topple Port Adelaide at Alberton Oval. Unfortunately for both Hosking and West Torrens he was forced to step down from the role mid-year due to his own health problems. This was announced just after West Torrens had played Sturt on 8 June. At the time Hosking stepped aside from his West Torrens duties they were just inside the SANFL top four. Mal Drury took over as West Torrens coach for the remainder of the season. West Torrens ended up finishing the 1940 SANFL season second last winning just one game under coach Mal Drury that year.

Hosking as Port–Torrens coach in 1942

During World War II the SANFL administrators reduced the number of sides in its competition from eight to four with clubs temporarily merging with their nearest neighbour. In Port Adelaide's case it merged with West Torrens with Hosking being chosen to coach the side. Early in the year Hosking's freshly assembled Port–Torrens side beat a team representing the Air Force by 11 points on Alberton Oval featuring Frank Curcio (Fitzroy), Vin Doherty (Collingwood), Law (Western Australia), Jack Brittain (North Adelaide), Mervyn Waite (Glenelg) and Norm Hillard (Fitzroy). The Port–Torrens combination under Hosking won the 1942 SANFL Grand Final beating the West Adelaide–Glenelg team by 11 points. After the Grand Final Port–Torrens played a combined side made up of the remaining SANFL players, referred to as "The Rest", on Adelaide Oval on 26 September 1942. Under Hosking the Port–Torrens side defeated "The Rest" by two points.

The following year Hosking successfully returned Port–Torrens to the final match of the season, the 1943 SANFL Grand Final, where they faced a Norwood–North combination, ultimately falling short by 21 points. This was Hosking's last game as an SANFL league coach as he announced his retirement at the start of 1944, handing over his Port–Torrens responsibilities to Mal Drury.

=== Coaching style ===
Hosking setting up a place kick

As a coach Hosking was a strong proponent of players being able to kick the ball with both feet. Hosking had a preference for fast players.

Hosking advocated for training with the same intensity as when playing an actual game. Hosking believed that at training players should concentrate on overcoming their weaknesses.

Hosking invested time into players that other coaches typically considered lost causes, such as Bill Martin, with whom Sampson ran up and down the length of Adelaide Oval whilst practicing passing the ball between one another.

Hosking had a refrain that suggested players and coaches should "study the game and the moves of your opponents as a chess player would". Once a week when he was coaching Hosking gave his players blackboard lectures on their previous week's play. Hosking provided predetermined moves for his players during these blackboard lectures.

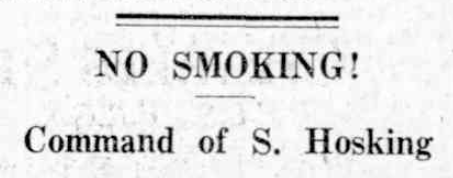
Newspaper article headline that appeared in The News highlighting Hosking's "No Smoking" edict to his players

Hosking strongly advocated for his players to not smoke. At half-time of a pre-season match in 1928 Hosking reprimanded some of his player who used the break to start smoking.

Hosking was also an advocate for the SANFL to proactively engage with schools in South Australia to help develop young players. Hosking coached local school teams on Alberton Oval before senior training commenced at 6pm.

For Port Adelaide's 150th anniversary twelve full pages of Hosking's coaching notes were made available in the Port Adelaide Archives Collection produced in 2020. After reading these notes Malcolm Blight stated that "95 per cent of Shine's notes still apply to today's game. A few minor things do not. But Shine could teach today's coaches a few things." In 2020 John Cahill made a comment about Hosking, along with Reginald Schumann, on Twitter saying that "Shine Hosking & Reg Schumann talented, skillful, tough players. Had the pleasure of sharing many conversations with. They spoke with conviction & great insight. More importantly just good men."

== Horse racing ==
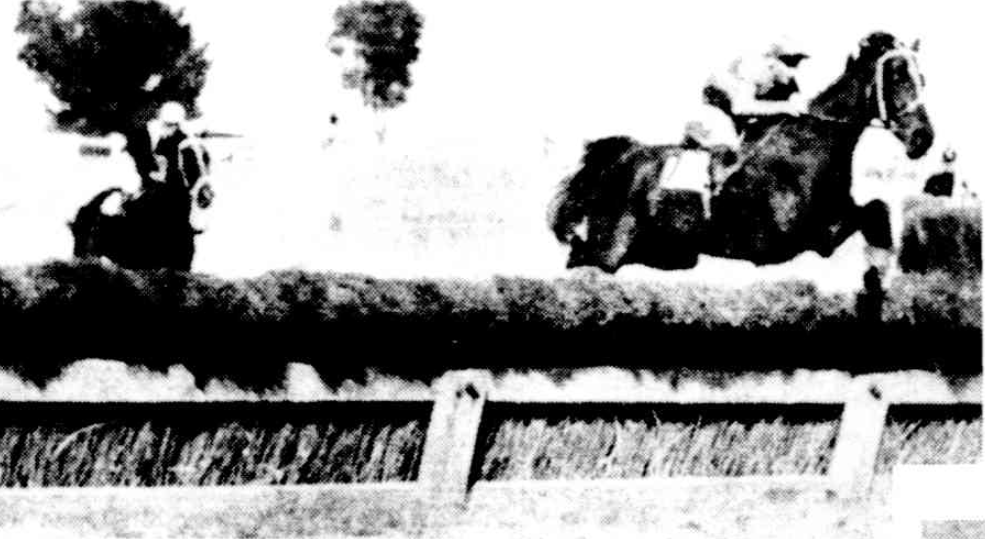
Coming down the hill during Oakbank's Von Doussa, Hosking's victorious Prestonia (right) is pictured leading Bay Anton (left).

Hosking enjoyed training horses, such as his 1939 Murray Bridge Steeplechase and 1940 Von Doussa Oakbank winner Prestonia. He shared this hobby with Kenneth Hosking, one of his sons. Kenneth was a jockey and wore black and white silks as a nod to his father's football career with Port Adelaide. On 18 October 1943 Hosking was granted an owner-trainer licence by the SAJC. In September 1944 one of Hosking's horses named Vitalise won a race at Morphettville Racecourse.

== Personal life ==
Hosking married Lillie Ann Thompson on 31 August 1907. Hosking was a member of the Alberton Bowling Club. He died on 20 October 1974 at the age of 86. In the 1974 Port Adelaide Annual Report and Balance Sheet an obituary recognised Sampson Hosking noting that he had died "after a long illness".

== Honours ==
In 1970 Hosking, along with other veteran players from before World War I, was honoured with a motorcade around Alberton Oval to celebrate the Port Adelaide Football Club's 100th anniversary.

Hosking was one of the 113 inaugural inductees into the South Australian Football Hall of Fame in 2002. In 2020 the Adelaide Advertiser compiled a list of "Port Adelaide's 150 Greatest Players" and placed Hosking at 5th. Hosking was awarded life membership of the Port Adelaide Football Club in 1919. Hosking was awarded life membership of the Semaphore Central Football Club in 1936.

== See also ==
=== Grand Finals ===
1. 1907 SAFL Grand Final (player, Port Adelaide)
2. 1909 SAFL Grand Final (player, Port Adelaide)
3. 1910 SAFL Grand Final (player, Port Adelaide)
4. 1911 SAFL Grand Final (player, Port Adelaide)
5. 1912 SAFL Grand Final (player, Port Adelaide)
6. 1913 SAFL Grand Final (player, Port Adelaide)
7. 1914 SAFL Grand Final (player, Port Adelaide)
8. 1915 SAFL Grand Final (player, Port Adelaide)
9. 1916 SAPFL Grand Final (player, Port Adelaide)
10. 1917 SAPFL Grand Final (player, Port Adelaide)
11. 1921 SAFL Grand Final (player + coach, Port Adelaide)
12. 1922 SAFL Grand Final (coach, West Adelaide)
13. 1928 SANFL Grand Final (coach, Port Adelaide)
14. 1929 SANFL Grand Final (coach, Port Adelaide)
15. 1930 SANFL Grand Final (coach, Port Adelaide)
16. 1933 SANFL Grand Final (coach, West Torrens)
17. 1936 SANFL Grand Final (coach, Port Adelaide)
18. 1937 SANFL Grand Final (coach, Port Adelaide)
19. 1938 SANFL Grand Final (coach, Port Adelaide)
20. 1939 SANFL Grand Final (coach, West Torrens)
21. 1942 SANFL Grand Final (coach, Port–Torrens)
22. 1943 SANFL Grand Final (coach, Port–Torrens)

=== Interstate games ===
- 1911 Adelaide Carnival (player, South Australia)
- 1921 Perth Carnival (player, South Australia)

=== Other games ===
- 1910 Championship of Australia (player, Port Adelaide)
- 1913 Championship of Australia (player, Port Adelaide)
- 1914 Championship of Australia (player, Port Adelaide)
- 1914 Port Adelaide v South Australia (player, Port Adelaide)

== Sources ==
- Atkinson, G. (1982) Everything you ever wanted to know about Australian rules football but couldn't be bothered asking, The Five Mile Press: Melbourne. ISBN 0 86788 009 0.
- Hosking, Sampson (as told to Lawrie Jervis Junior), "Three Years' Football Under False Name, The (Adelaide) News, (Saturday, 27 July 1946), p.5.
- Port Adelaide Football Club (2020) The Archives Collection: PAFC 150 Year, Iconic Treasures, Melbourne. ISBN 064859842X.
