= Harold Oliver (Australian footballer) =

Australian rules footballer

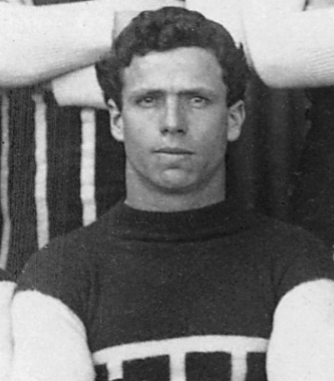

Personal information
- Full name: William Harold Oliver
- Born: 12 August 1891; Waukaringa, South Australia
- Died: 15 November 1958 (aged 67); Adelaide, South Australia
- Original teams: South Broken Hill (1908); Lyrup (1909); West Suburbans (1910)
- Height: 182 cm (6 ft 0 in)
- Weight: 83 kg (183 lb)
- Position: Utility

Playing career^{1}
Years	Club	Games (Goals)
1910–15, 1919–22	Port Adelaide	107 (89)
1916	SA Railways (Patriotic League)	1 (0)
1916–17	Port Adelaide (Patriotic League)	13 (11)
Total		121 (100)

Representative team honours
Years	Team	Games (Goals)
1911–1912, 1921	South Australia	14 (15)
- ^{1} Playing statistics correct to the end of 1922.

Career highlights
- Club: 3× Champions of Australia team member (1910, 1913, 1914); 4× Port Adelaide premiership player (1910, 1913, 1914, 1921); 2× Port Adelaide patriotic league premiership player (1916, 1917); 2× Port Adelaide best and fairest (1911, 1912); Leader for 1912 Magarey Medal (but ineligible to win); The Sport (Adelaide) 'Best All-round League Player' (1911); Best on ground (Port Adelaide def. South Australia, 1914); Port Adelaide premiership captain (1921); Port Adelaide best junior (1910); Representative: South Australia captain (Western Australia v. South Australia, 1921); 14 games for South Australia; 1911 South Australian state carnival championship team; Honours: Port Adelaide's greatest team (right half-forward); Port Adelaide Hall of Fame (1998); Port Adelaide life membership (1922); SANFL hall of fame (2002)

William Harold Oliver (12 August 1891 – 15 November 1958) was an Australian rules footballer. Harold Oliver was a key player to some of South Australian football's most successful teams. He starred in South Australia's victorious 1911 Australian football championship along with Port Adelaide's 1914 "Invincibles" team. After being close to retiring from the game after World War I, he returned to captain both Port Adelaide to the 1921 SAFL premiership and South Australia in a game against Western Australia. His reputation as an early exponent of the spectacular mark—along with his general skill at playing the game—saw him regarded as one of the best players South Australia has produced.

== Early life in Waukaringa (1891–1895) ==
Cornish immigrants James Oliver and Sarah Mill settled in the gold-mining town of Waukaringa in the late 1870s. It was common for Cornish people, where mining was a key industry, to move to Australia and use their knowledge to attempt a better life as the economy in Cornwall was waning.

In 1887, whilst working on the New Alma and Victoria goldmine, James lost parts of his right hand's fingers and thumb whilst holding a dynamite cap that accidentally detonated. Waukaringa raised over £20 ($2,334 in 2020 dollars) to help James in his recovery.

On 12 August 1891, Harold Oliver was born. Harold had eleven siblings. During Harold's childhood in the 1890s, Waukaringa was home to around 600 people.

On 23 February 1895, James left Waukaringa, taking his family to Broken Hill. The Adelaide Observer noted his departure from the town, saying: "Mr Oliver left Waukaringa today. He was one of the oldest residents, and most respected."

Today, Waukaringa is a ghost town.

== Broken Hill years (1895–1908) ==
The Souths had three juniors from the Imperials, and one of them (Oliver) more than held his own forward. He is a good mark and a safe kick, and was responsible for three of the Souths goals. The Souths could do worse than make a big effort to retain his services.

— The Barrier Miner

When Harold Oliver was five, his family moved to the New South Wales mining town of Broken Hill.

Oliver started playing football in Broken Hill for a junior team called the South Imperials. In 1908, his last year living in Broken Hill, he debuted for the South Broken Hill Football Club in the Broken Hill Football League at the age of 17.

== Lyrup Football Club (1909) ==
In 1909, Harold Oliver moved to Lyrup, South Australia, and started a farm growing fruit. During this time, he captained the Lyrup football team, which had previously not won a game. In 1909, with the assistance of his brother, Harold helped the Lyrup football club win the local riverland league premiership. Oliver was awarded the Lyrup Football Club best-and-fairest award at the end of the riverland season.

On all sides it was admitted that Harold Oliver was the best man on the ground, for he marked and kicked like, a veteran.

— Renmark Pioneer

After the season, Lyrup traveled to Mildura, where they lost twice to the home team. The Mildura Cultivator praised Oliver's marking and kicking, reporting that it was as good as anyone who had played at the ground. An umpire at the game from Melbourne told Harold that he would be welcome in Melbourne to play football if he wanted to. At the end of 1909, Oliver was contemplating moving to Queensland to join his sister in the state; however, two friends, the Musgrave brothers, who played for West Suburbans in Adelaide, suggested he come down and visit.

== Port Adelaide Football Club (1910–1922) ==
When Oliver arrived in Adelaide, he started playing for West Suburbans and immediately began to draw attention from the two largest South Australian Football League (SAFL) clubs, Norwood and Port Adelaide. South Australian businessman Edwin T. Smith was sending Oliver letters asking him to come train with Norwood, whilst John Woolard, then captain of Port Adelaide—who, like Oliver, grew up in Broken Hill—was also enquiring about his services. Before Oliver made his debut with Port Adelaide, he was lined up with a job shovelling furnace waste. Disgruntled, he spoke to the Musgrave brothers' father, who suggested he approach West Torrens and train with them, to which Oliver agreed. Port Adelaide secretary James Hodge prevented this move, however, as Oliver had signed a contract with him shortly beforehand. To placate Oliver, Hodge later took Oliver out on a fishing trip to resolve the feud and found him a better job.

=== Debut for Port Adelaide ===
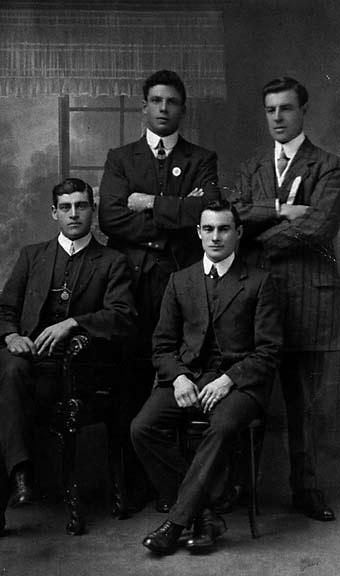
Harold Oliver with fellow Port Adelaide players who represented South Australia in the states victorious National football carnival in 1911 (L–R: Congear, Oliver, Hosking, Hansen).

Harold Oliver was listed to make his debut for the club in the first round of the 1910 SAFL season. Such was Oliver's enthusiasm to make his debut that he arrived at the Adelaide Train Station in his full playing uniform. However, due to the death of King Edward VII, the first round of SAFL matches were postponed as a sign of respect. Oliver eventually made his senior debut for Port Adelaide on 25 June 1910 in a win against North Adelaide at Jubilee Oval. Port Adelaide would win the SAFL premiership in Oliver's debut season and would subsequently contest the 1910 Championship of Australia in a match against Victorian Football League (VFL) premiers Collingwood. Harold Oliver kicked 5 goals in the match, helping Port Adelaide defeat Collingwood and claim national honours. In 1910, Oliver also made the journey with Port Adelaide to Western Australia to play a series of matches. This was the first trip by an eastern state club to play football in Western Australia. Harold Oliver was awarded a gold medal by Port Adelaide for being the best junior of the 1910 season for the club.

Oliver is one of the youngest and, so far as the 1911 season is concerned, has been the most brilliant exponent of all the players in senior football. He is only 20 years of age, and, although he entered the arena as an inexperienced junior last year, he has made remarkable headway to pride of place which The Register unhesitatingly gives to him this year. He holds his own with the best of the more experience exponents of the game, and taking into consideration his age and experience, he is well entitled to the (Magarey) medal. He is a fine type of athlete and possesses all the qualities for a successful and leading footballer for years to come.

— South Australia Register

Harold Oliver was a member of the South Australian state team that won the 1911 Interstate Carnival, defeating the Victorian side 11.11 (77) to 5.4 (34). Players in the 1911 South Australian team included Bert Renfrey (captain), Vic Cumberland, Richard Head, Tom Leahy, and Dave Low, along with Port Adelaide players Sampson Hosking, Angelo Congear, and Frank Hansen. During Round 2 of the 1911 SAFL season, Oliver kicked 7 goals against North Adelaide in what was his twelfth game for Port Adelaide. At the end of the 1911 SAFL season, Harold Oliver was awarded his first Port Adelaide Best and Fairest in just his second year at the club. During an end of year dinner for the Port Adelaide Football Club players and officials, the then vice president of the club, Dr Alexander Benson, declared that "Oliver should have gained the Magarey Medal", which was instead won by Harold Cumberland. Dr Benson's position was supported by readers of The Sport, an upstart Adelaide newspaper, whose readers voted more than 6:1 that Oliver had a better season than Cumberland.

He kicked 28 goals in the 1912 SAFL season. During a game against Norwood at Norwood Oval, Oliver got into a fight with Ed Edwards of Norwood, with both players reported by umpire Dollman. As a result, both Oliver and Edwards were suspended, thereby meaning the Magarey Medal favourite would be disqualified from winning the award. Despite this, he would be awarded his second consecutive Port Adelaide Best and Fairest at the end of the 1912 SAFL season . Oliver polled first in the club's best and fairest for almost every round and won the award by over 500 votes. The Register, a local Adelaide newspaper, said regarding the Magarey Medal that "While giving full credit to the winner, however, it is only fair to state that had not Oliver (the brilliant young Port Adelaide player) been disqualified through a regrettable occurrence in a match at Norwood he would undoubtedly have been the medallist this time. He stands out conspicuously."

While giving full credit to the winner, however, it is only fair to state that had not Oliver (the brilliant young Port Adelaide player) been disqualified through a regrettable occurrence in a match at Norwood he would undoubtedly have been the medallist this time. He stands out conspicuously.

— The Adelaide Register

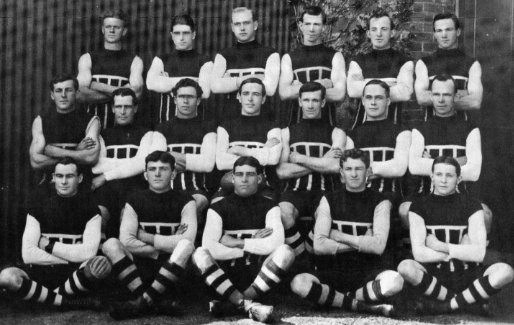
Harold Oliver—third left, middle row—with Port Adelaide's 1914 "Invincibles" team.

For the 1913 season, Oliver was appointed vice captain of Port Adelaide alongside the new club captain, John Londrigan, who had just come from the Adelaide University Football Club after that club's failed attempt to gain entry into the SAFL. During August, Harold Oliver married Blanche Downer from Lyrup. Port Adelaide won the 1913 SAFL premiership by defeating North Adelaide in the 1913 SAFL Grand Final in front of 22,000 spectators at Adelaide Oval. Oliver and Port Adelaide went on to win the 1913 Championship of Australia by defeating VFL premier Fitzroy.

In 1914, Harold Oliver played every game for the year. He was part of Port Adelaide's undefeated 1914 team that held North Adelaide to a single goal in the 1914 SAFL Grand Final and defeated VFL premiers Carlton in the 1914 Championship of Australia match at the Adelaide Oval. A game played between Port Adelaide and a composite team of the best SAFL players was held in the post-season, with Port Adelaide coming out as the victors. Harold Oliver captained Port Adelaide that day and was awarded a trophy as best on ground with arguably the best players of the competition taking to the field on that day.

=== War years in Berri and the Patriotic League ===
During World War I, Harold Oliver returned to Berri to maintain his farm. One of his close friends, William Powell, sent him a letter during his time serving that included a short paragraph describing how Australian soldiers were discussing his prowess and that others were exclaiming "Oliver!" whilst playing the Australian game.

There is one thing Harold that I must mention to you right here and it is something which ought to make you and Mrs Oliver and also little Miss Oliver phoned [sic] and it is this that since leaving Dear old Australia I have heard your name and fame discussed in three different countries namely Egypt, Lemnos Island (Greece) and at the front offensive in the ferocity line even amid the din of battle when bullets bombs and shrapnel were dealing both death and destruction on all sides I have ofttimes heard your fame discussed in arguments about football and I remember as we were travelling from Port Suez to Cairo going through the valley of the Nile by train we passed some Indians who are stationed there, playing football and as the ball was up in the air someone on our train yelled out the old famous battle cry Oliver. I can tell you Harold it sent a thrill of pleasure right through me to hear the good old name and know that others besides myself had not forgotten you.

— Corporal William J Powell

Due to the war, the SAFA suspended its competition from 1916 through to 1918. Despite this official suspension, a group of South Australian clubs decided to form their own league in 1916, and the money generated would be put toward the war effort. The Railways Football Club was one of the clubs that participated in this competition and managed to attract Harold Oliver to be the club's captain. Unfortunately for the Railways, Oliver would only play one game for the Railways, and he would instead return to Berri to focus on his farm. Later in the season, Oliver returned to Port Adelaide to play a few games for the club, which was also partaking in the Patriotic League. Port Adelaide would end up winning the 1916 South Australian Patriotic League Grand Final by defeating West Torrens 7.11 (53) to 1.13 (19). Harold Oliver played for Port Adelaide during the game and kicked a goal.

After World War I, Harold Oliver had chosen to retire from league football for the upcoming 1919 SAFL season. Towards the close of the 1919 SAFL season, Port Adelaide had successfully qualified for finals, finishing the minor round fourth. In a bid to increase their chances of September success, Port Adelaide put a call out to Oliver to play in the club's final against West Torrens to which he accepted. Unfortunately, Oliver was out of touch due to not having played during the year, and thus Port Adelaide was eliminated from the year's finals.

=== Return to football, captain of Port Adelaide and South Australia ===
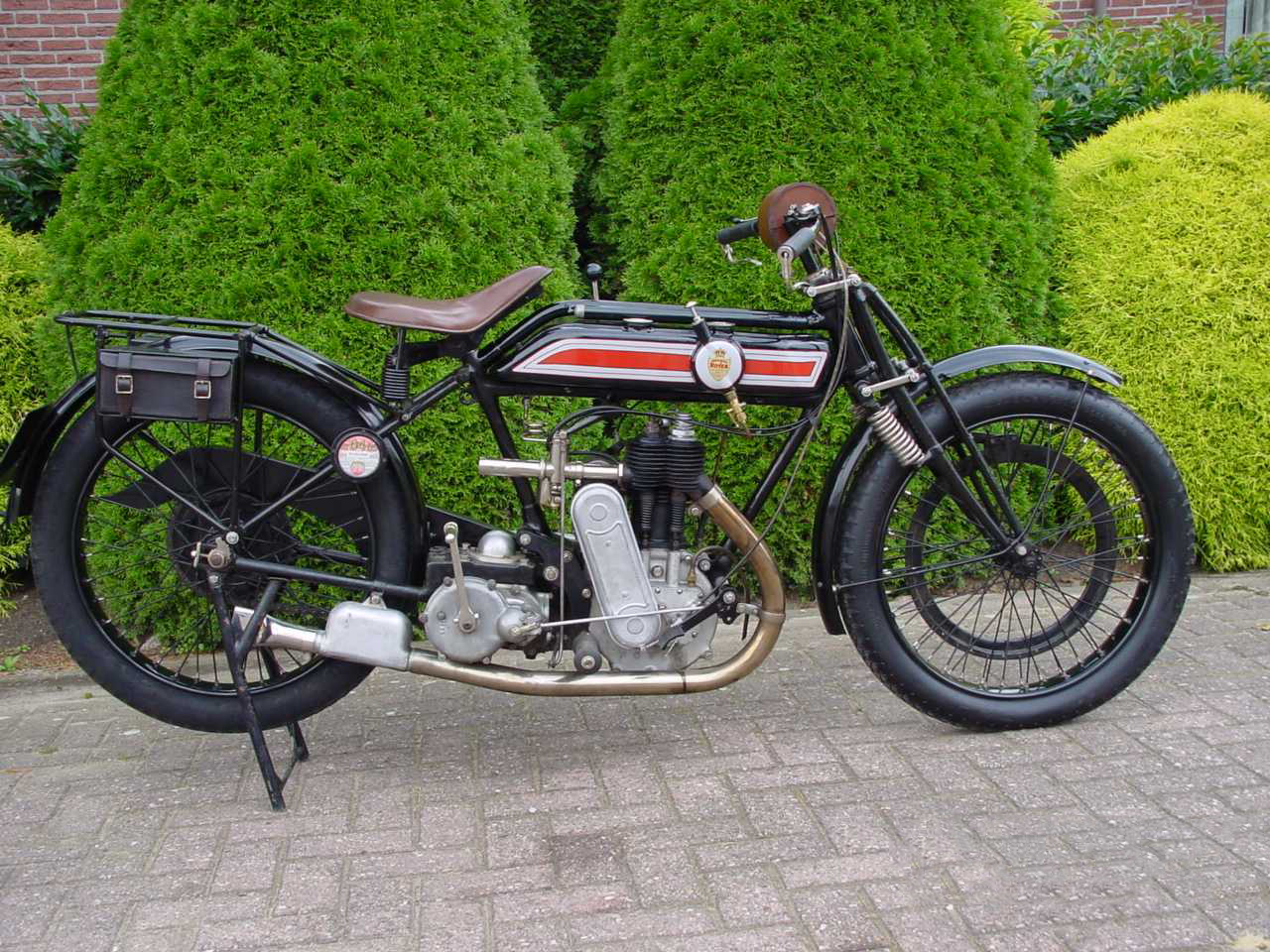
At the end of 1920, a group of Port Adelaide fans bought a 3.5hp Rover motorcycle for Oliver (same as the model pictured) to enable him to make the trip back and forth to his farm in Berri, South Australia.

In 1920, keen supporters of the Port Adelaide Football Club, headed by Mr. Swain, collectively raised £77.13.8 ($5,554 in 2020 terms) and bought Harold a Rover 3.5hp motor-cycle so he could make his commute of over 200 km to and from Berri, where he eventually settled on his own property as a fruit grower during the 1920 season.

During the 1921 season, Oliver served his sole season as Port Adelaide captain. During August, Oliver would be designated captain of the South Australian state team during a trip to Western Australia for a state football carnival along with Victoria. Oliver would become sick during the trip and would miss the game against Victoria but would manage to play a game as captain of South Australia against Western Australia a few days later.

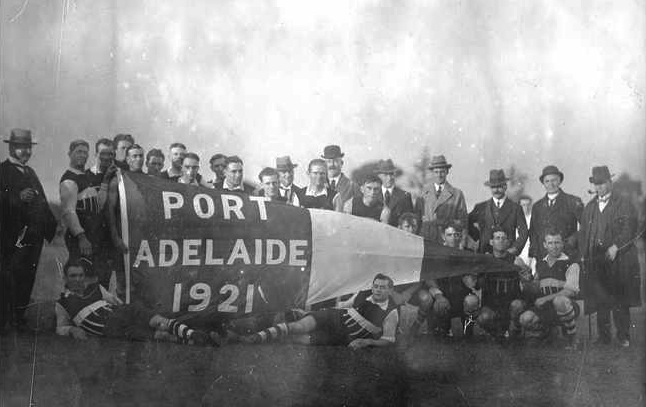
Oliver captained Port Adelaide's 1921 SAFL premiership.

Upon returning to Adelaide for the remainder of the season, he would lead the club to the 1921 SAFL premiership, defeating Norwood by 8 points in the 1921 SAFL Grand Final in front of 34,800 spectators at the Adelaide Oval. This would be Oliver's fourth and final premiership with Port Adelaide.

In 1922, after playing only 5 league matches for the season, his career at Port Adelaide finally came to an end due to commitments to his farm at Berri and disputes regarding game compensation. His contract termination meant he was paid £76 of £100 for the season.

== Return to Riverland football (1923–1932) ==
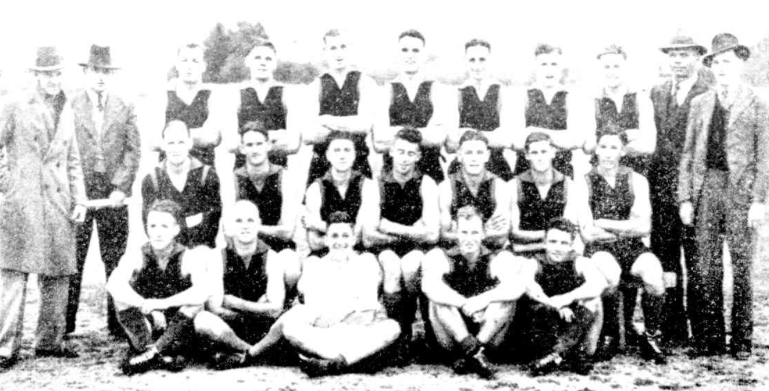
Harold Oliver, second from right, with the 1938 Berri Football Club URML premiers.

When Harold Oliver retired from league football, he returned to his fruit farm to settle with his wife Blanche in the South Australian Riverland town of Berri. He became captain-coach of the Berri Football Club in 1923.

During a match for Berri-Barmera in 1925, a drunken spectator by the name of John Purcell who, after previously shouting abuse at Oliver, went onto the playing field just before half-time and punched Harold in the jaw with a glancing blow. Oliver retaliated and punched Purcell in self-defence, as he was intimidated by Purcell, who was a "big" man. Purcell later died with meningitis, and Oliver was subsequently arrested. At Oliver's court hearing, the Jury retired for only five minutes and returned a verdict of "not guilty".

Berri Football Club replanted a new oval in 1927, and Harold Oliver worked as a groundskeeper. During that year, Oliver recommended Berri footballer John Wade to his old club Port Adelaide. Wade would successfully go on to play in Port Adelaide's 1928 premiership. In 1929, at the age of 38, Oliver had kicked 21 goals from the opening three games for the Upper Murray Association football team and averaged more than 10 goals at the club's Berri home ground for the season. He played his last-ever football game in 1931 when his club won the Upper Murray Association premiership by defeating Barmera. During the match, he kicked six goals from six shots at goal. Oliver coached Berri to premierships in 1937 and 1938. During the 1938 post-season, Oliver organised an exhibition match between Berri and his old club Port Adelaide.

== Personal life ==
Harold Oliver married Blanche Downer of Lyrup on 19 July 1913. He had three children: Beryl, James and Joyce.

In his retirement, Oliver lived in Cowandilla. He died on 15 November 1958, aged 67. The only club representatives at his funeral were Bob McLean and Charles Darwent, leading to the former to say in his book 100 Years with the Magpies that "There is a very true saying, when referring to the champions, that they are peacock's feathers today and feather dusters tomorrow ... How the mighty fall!".

== Legacy ==
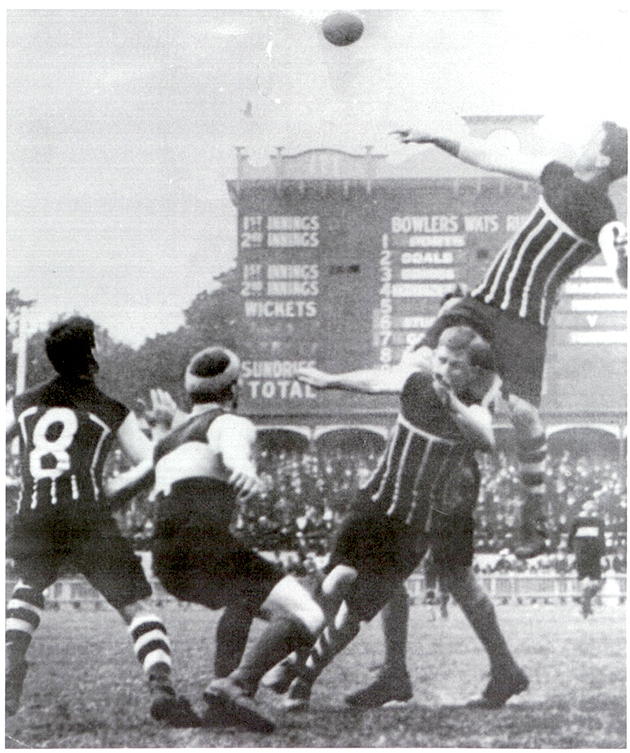
Oliver taking a spectacular mark during the 1914 SAFL Semi Final against Sturt at Adelaide Oval.

Harold Oliver is often considered one of the best South Australian players never to win the Magarey Medal. This is partially the result of the medal not being awarded for several years during World War I while the SAFL competition was suspended, along with being ineligible in 1912.

=== Spectacular mark ===
Within South Australia at the time, he was unanimously considered the best exponent of the spectacular high-flying mark. In 1935, Australian cricket umpire George Hele, whilst writing for The Sporting Globe in Melbourne, described Harold Oliver as the "[Roy] Cazaly of South Australia". When former South Adelaide champion Steve McKee was reminiscing about Oliver's debut in 1910, he wrote that "Harold Oliver, a highflier equal in skill to [Phil] Matson, but more certain in his leaping, burst like a meteor into the football firmament in that year."

=== Interstate reputation ===
The aforementioned Phil Matson, East Perth premiership player and coach, regarded Harold Oliver as the best centreman he had met during his football career. Tom Outridge Sr, winner of the inaugural Sandover Medal, said that one of his outstanding memories was of Harold Oliver, stating that when he was a boy he was "taken by his father to see Port play at Kalgoorlie in 1913. The memory of Oliver's brilliant game is as vivid in my mind today as it was when I left the ground that day. He was a wonderful player." After the 1911 Adelaide Carnival, Ralph Robertson praised the performance of Oliver. When retired Tasmanian footballer Charlie Goddard travelled to watch his son play for Tasmania at the 1914 Sydney Carnival, he stated how he was enraptured by Harold Oliver's play, saying he was "the noblest roman of them all".

=== Local reputation ===
Tom Leahy, Magarey Medalist and captain of North Adelaide, once stated after a game at Alberton Oval that "North Adelaide would certainly have won had Port not possessed a superman in Oliver." Vic Richardson, captain of the Sturt Football Club and Australian cricket team, described Harold Oliver as being "The finest all-round exponent of Australian football in my playing and watching experience of it". Charlie Checkett, long serving curator of the Adelaide Oval, considered Harold Oliver "The greatest footballer this state [South Australia] has produced". When James Matthews, captain of North Adelaide and South Australian cricketer, was asked in 1951, four decades after he retired, who he thought was the finest all-round Australian rules footballer, he stated Harold Oliver. In 1965, a publication covering 100 years of South Australian football written by Charles Knuckey included the state's all-time team; Harold Oliver was allocated the position of centre half-forward.

=== Port Adelaide reputation ===
Angelo Congear, whose career completely overlapped with Oliver, said that "As an all-round player, Harold Oliver is my pick. In his prime he played a wonderfully clever game anywhere. He is also the fairest player it has been my pleasure to play with." In 1924 after 40 years of involvement with training footballers Jack McGargill, former Port Adelaide head trainer, described Harold Oliver as "the finest footballer the state has produced". In 1948, Arthur Swain, the club's former chairman who had been associated with the club for 44 years at the time, stated that "Harold Oliver was the greatest footballer I have ever seen in my life", thereby ranking him ahead of the recently retired Bob Quinn. A section of the 1951 PAFC Annual Report paid tribute to Harold Oliver by stating that he "was a champion in any position on the field, being an outstanding high mark and a magnificent kick. He played with conspicuous brilliance in many interstate matches and will rank amongst the really great players of all time." Albert Tomlin, who played with Port Adelaide from 1888 to 1894, considered Harold Oliver to be Port Adelaide's best-ever player and the best all-rounder anywhere, alongside Tom MacKenzie.

=== Honours ===
Oliver was one of the first 18 inaugural members of Port Adelaide's Hall of Fame in 1998. In 2001, Harold Oliver was named in the Port Adelaide Football Club's greatest team of all time, placed on the half-forward flank. In 2002, Harold Oliver was inducted into the South Australian Football Hall of Fame. In 2020, the Adelaide Advertiser ranked Port Adelaide's best 50 players, with Harold Oliver coming in at number 11.
