= Port Adelaide vs South Australia (1914) =

Australian rules football match

Port Adelaide	South Australia
14.14 (98)	5.10 (40)
	1	2	3	4
PA	1.2 (8)	6.7 (43)	8.9 (57)	14.14 (98)
SA	2.3 (15)	2.7 (19)	5.10 (40)	5.10 (40)
- Date: 14 October 1914
- Stadium: Jubilee Oval
- Umpires: C.L. Cornish

Accolades
- Best on Ground: Harold Oliver (Port Adelaide)

The Port Adelaide v South Australia (1914) exhibition match played between Port Adelaide and the South Australian state team was an Australian rules football match played at the Jubilee Oval on 14 October 1914. The match saw one of seven South Australian Football League (SAFL) clubs in Port Adelaide take on a composite team of players from the remaining 6 clubs. Port Adelaide won the match by 58 points.

== Background ==
Prior to the match Port Adelaide had won the 1914 SAFL Grand Final after going through the season undefeated. In addition to winning the South Australian premiership the club also defeated the Victorian Football League (VFL) premier Carlton at Adelaide Oval for the 1914 Championship of Australia.

The match was held as the key attraction for the Eight Hours Day public holiday.

== Match summary ==
=== Weather conditions ===
A clear and sunny October day provided perfect, if slightly warm, conditions for the match.

=== First quarter ===
The wind in the first quarter was in favour of South Australia.

=== Second quarter ===
With the benefit of the wind in the second quarter Port Adelaide surged ahead kicking 5 goals 5 behinds to South Australia's 4 behinds.

=== Third quarter ===
The third quarter featured a tussle between Sampson Hosking and Albert Klose. Horrie Pope relieved Harold Oliver of centre duties for a period.

=== Fourth quarter ===
In the final quarter Port Adelaide's system and fitness overwhelmed South Australia kicking 6 goals 5 behinds to nothing.

=== Best on ground medal ===
The medal for the best player during the match was awarded to Harold Oliver of Port Adelaide.

== Teams ==
Port Adelaide
Charles Anderson	Jack Ashley	William Boon
Albert Chaplin	Angelo Congear	Roy Drummond
Henry Eaton	Sampson Hosking	Cuthbert Lincoln
Frank Magor	Alan Maynard	Alex McFarlane
John Middleton	Harold Oliver (c)	Horrie Pope
John W. Robertson	Joseph Watson	Leonard Wisdom
Clifford Cocks (EMG)		

South Australia
Bill Mayman (c) – Sturt	Harold Dwyer – West Adelaide	Frank Barry – South Adelaide
Victor Stephens – Norwood	Clarence Packham – Norwood	Stanley Patten – West Torrens
Albert Klose – North Adelaide	Frank Golding – Sturt	Frank Keen – South Adelaide
Dave Lowe – West Torrens	Guy Stephens – Norwood	Robert Dugan – South Adelaide
Frank Fitzgerald – West Adelaide	Jack Tredrea (vc) – South Adelaide	Darcy McDougall – Sturt
Tom Leahy – North Adelaide	William Dowling – West Adelaide	Jack Hanley – West Adelaide

== Scorecard ==
=== Port Adelaide vs. South Australia ===
Port Adelaide vs. South Australia
Wednesday, 14 October	Port Adelaide	def.	South Australia	Jubilee Oval
1.2 (8); 6.7 (43); 8.9 (57); 14.14 (98)	Q1; Q2; Q3; Final	2.3 (15); 2.7 (19); 5.10 (40); 5.10 (40)
Chaplin 4 Watson 3 Drummond, Congear, Wisdom, McFarlane, Andersen, Ashley, Oliver 1	Goals	2 Packham; 1 Barry, Stephens, Fitzgerald
A medal for best on ground was awarded to Harold Oliver of Port Adelaide.
