= 1915 SAFL season =

1915 season of SANFL

1915 SAFL premiership season
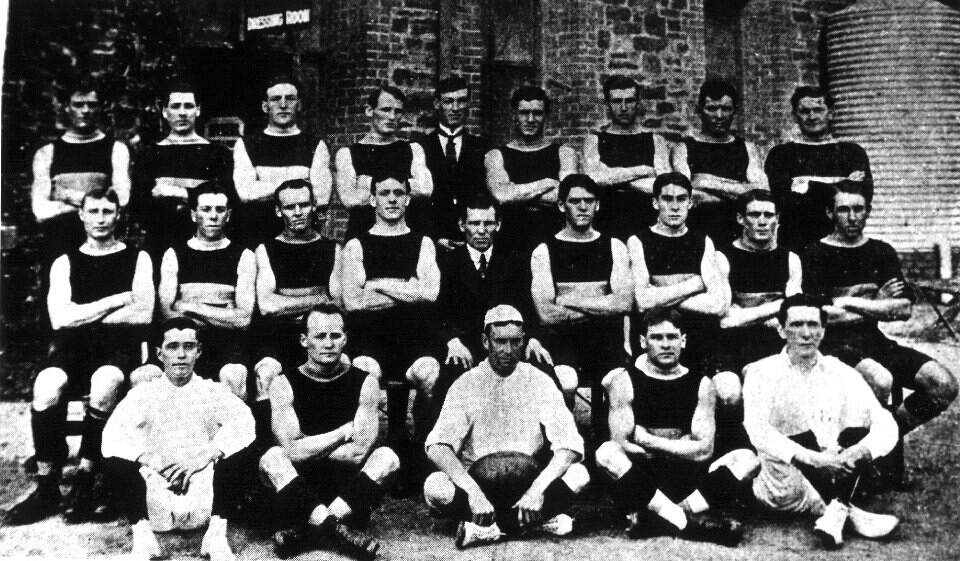
- 1915 Sturt premiership team
- Teams: 7
- Premiers: Sturt; 1st premiership
- Minor premiers: Port Adelaide; 12th minor premiership
- Magarey Medallist: Frank Barry; South Adelaide; Charlie Perry (Note: Awarded retrospectively and posthumously); Norwood; Sampson Hosking; Port Adelaide
- Leading goalkicker: F. Fitzgerald; West Adelaide (31 goals)
- Matches played: 45
- Highest: 13,000 (Grand Final, Port Adelaide vs. Sturt)

The 1915 South Australian Football League season was the 39th season of the top-level Australian rules football competition in South Australia.

This was the last season of the SAFL before the competition was suspended for three seasons due to the escalation of World War I. Many established players became entirely unavailable due to war service, including Port Adelaide premiership player Joseph Watson, North Adelaide's Le Messurier, Sturt's Bannigan and Baulderstone and several Norwood players, of whom Phil Robin would during June become the first SANFL player killed in the war.

Port Adelaide, nicknamed "The Invincibles", entered the season having won 25 consecutive competition games; no 1914 opponent, league or otherwise, had come within 20 points of them in a match. Before the season started, Port Adelaide was weakened by the loss of captain Londrigan to retirement, and lost to injury Jack Ashley and later Harold Oliver plus several players to war service as the season progressed, but still finished as minor premiers. By the end of the minor round, second-placed South Adelaide was favoured for the premiership in its first finals appearance since 1905, but they were eliminated by West Adelaide. Fourth-placed Sturt, after a very weak start to the season, won its first premiership after defeating minor premiers Port Adelaide in the challenge grand final.

== Minor Round ==
=== Round 1 ===
	Round 1
Saturday, 1 May 1915	South Adelaide 4.8 (32)	def. by	Port Adelaide 10.10 (70)	Adelaide Oval
Saturday, 1 May 1915	Norwood 9.11 (65)	def.	North Adelaide 6.12 (48)	Norwood Oval
Saturday, 1 May 1915	Sturt 8.12 (60)	def. by	West Adelaide 15.12 (102)	Unley Oval
	Bye; West Torrens

=== Round 2 ===
	Round 2
Saturday, 8 May 1915	West Torrens 9.11 (65)	def.	Norwood 4.10 (34)	Hindmarsh Oval
Monday, 10 May 1915	South Adelaide 6.15 (51)	def.	West Adelaide 5.6 (36)	Adelaide Oval
Monday, 10 May 1915	Sturt 5.11 (41)	def. by	Port Adelaide 8.14 (62)	Unley Oval
	Bye; West Adelaide

=== Round 3 ===
	Round 3
Saturday, 15 May 1915	North Adelaide 3.10 (28)	def.	West Adelaide 1.10 (16)	Adelaide Oval
Saturday, 15 May 1915	West Torrens 3.8 (26)	def. by	South Adelaide 5.8 (38)	Hindmarsh Oval
Saturday, 15 May 1915	Norwood 2.6 (18)	def. by	Sturt 7.4 (46)	Norwood Oval
	Bye; Port Adelaide

=== Round 4 ===
	Round 4
Saturday, 22 May 1915	North Adelaide 8.13 (61)	def.	West Torrens 4.8 (32)	Adelaide Oval
Saturday, 22 May 1915	Port Adelaide 12.13 (85)	def.	West Adelaide 3.3 (21)	Alberton Oval
Saturday, 22 May 1915	Sturt 8.8 (56)	def. by	South Adelaide 13.12 (90)	Unley Oval
	Bye; Norwood

=== Round 5 ===
	Round 5
Saturday, 5 June 1915	South Adelaide 8.5 (53)	def.	Norwood 6.6 (42)	Adelaide Oval
Monday, 7 June 1915	North Adelaide 3.12 (30)	def. by	Port Adelaide 7.6 (48)	Adelaide Oval
Monday, 7 June 1915	West Torrens 7.18 (60)	def.	Sturt 8.9 (57)	Hindmarsh Oval
	Bye; West Adelaide

=== Round 6 ===
	Round 6
Saturday, 12 June 1915	West Adelaide 8.15 (63)	def.	West Torrens 5.6 (36)	Adelaide Oval
Saturday, 12 June 1915	North Adelaide 8.10 (58)	def.	South Adelaide 7.15 (57)	Jubilee Oval
Saturday, 12 June 1915	Norwood 6.5 (41)	def. by	Port Adelaide 10.18 (78)	Norwood Oval
	Bye; Sturt

=== Round 7 ===
	Round 7
Saturday, 19 June 1915	North Adelaide 8.10 (58)	def. by	Sturt 8.12 (60)	Adelaide Oval
Saturday, 19 June 1915	Port Adelaide 13.15 (93)	def.	West Torrens 4.9 (33)	Alberton Oval
Saturday, 19 June 1915	Norwood 7.6 (48)	def. by	West Adelaide 8.8 (56)	Norwood Oval
	Bye; South Adelaide

=== Round 8 ===
	Round 8
Saturday, 26 June 1915	Port Adelaide 4.8 (32)	drew with	South Adelaide 4.8 (32)	Alberton Oval
Monday, 28 June 1915	West Adelaide 2.15 (27)	def. by	Sturt 4.7 (31)	Adelaide Oval
Monday, 28 June 1915	North Adelaide 7.17 (59)	def.	Norwood 3.8 (26)	Jubilee Oval
	Bye; West Torrens
South's draw with Port Adelaide ended a run of 31 consecutive wins by Port Adelaide; and ended Port Adelaide's run of 31 consecutive wins at Alberton Oval dating back to the middle of 1909.

=== Round 9 ===
	Round 9
Saturday, 3 July 1915	South Adelaide 7.9 (51)	def.	West Adelaide 5.10 (40)	Adelaide Oval
Saturday, 3 July 1915	Port Adelaide 9.15 (69)	def.	Sturt 3.13 (31)	Alberton Oval
Saturday, 3 July 1915	Norwood 7.4 (46)	def.	West Torrens 5.10 (40)	Norwood Oval
	Bye; North Adelaide

=== Round 10 ===
	Round 10
Saturday, 24 July 1915	West Torrens 5.9 (39)	def. by	South Adelaide 7.14 (56)	Hindmarsh Oval
Saturday, 24 July 1915	West Adelaide 7.14 (56)	def.	North Adelaide 7.6 (48)	Jubilee Oval
Saturday, 24 July 1915	Sturt 9.13 (67)	def.	Norwood 6.11 (47)	Unley Oval
	Bye; Port Adelaide
On the Saturdays between Round 9 and Round 10, two patriotic matches were held to raise money for the Wounded Australians Fund.

=== Round 11 ===
	Round 11
Saturday, 31 July 1915	South Adelaide 8.5 (53)	def.	Sturt 7.9 (51)	Adelaide Oval
Saturday, 31 July 1915	West Torrens 9.15 (69)	def.	North Adelaide 8.12 (60)	Hindmarsh Oval
Saturday, 31 July 1915	West Adelaide 7.10 (52)	def.	Port Adelaide 4.11 (35)	Jubilee Oval
	Bye; Norwood
West Adelaide's win against Port Adelaide inflicted Port Adelaide's first SAFL defeat since round 7, 1913.

=== Round 12 ===
	Round 12
Saturday, 7 August 1915	North Adelaide 6.13 (49)	def. by	Port Adelaide 10.10 (70)	Adelaide Oval
Saturday, 7 August 1915	Norwood 8.5 (53)	def.	South Adelaide 5.10 (40)	Norwood Oval
Saturday, 7 August 1915	Sturt 9.14 (68)	def.	West Torrens 6.8 (44)	Unley Oval
	Bye; West Adelaide

=== Round 13 ===
	Round 13
Saturday, 14 August 1915	South Adelaide 7.7 (49)	def.	North Adelaide 6.8 (44)	Adelaide Oval
Saturday, 14 August 1915	Port Adelaide 11.15 (81)	def.	Norwood 2.8 (20)	Alberton Oval
Saturday, 14 August 1915	West Torrens 6.13 (49)	def.	West Adelaide 6.5 (41)	Hindmarsh Oval
	Bye; Sturt

=== Round 14 ===
	Round 14
Saturday, 28 August 1915	West Adelaide 9.14 (68)	def.	Norwood 5.4 (34)	Adelaide Oval
Saturday, 28 August 1915	West Torrens 10.11 (71)	def.	Port Adelaide 10.9 (69)	Hindmarsh Oval
Saturday, 28 August 1915	Sturt 10.10 (70)	def.	North Adelaide 5.11 (41)	Unley Oval
	Bye; South Adelaide

== Ladder ==
1915 SAFL Ladder
Pos	Team	Pld	W	L	D	PF	PA	PP	Pts
1	Port Adelaide	12	9	2	1	792	453	63.61	19
2	South Adelaide	12	8	3	1	602	547	52.39	17
3	West Adelaide	12	6	6	0	578	556	50.97	12
4	Sturt (P)	12	6	6	0	638	671	48.74	12
5	West Torrens	12	5	7	0	564	686	45.12	10
6	North Adelaide	12	4	8	0	584	618	48.59	8
7	Norwood	12	3	9	0	474	701	40.34	6

Rules for classification: 1) points; 2) percentage; 3) number of points for.
(P) Premiers

== Major round ==
=== First semi-final ===
	1915 SAFL first semi-final
Saturday, 4 September 1915	Port Adelaide 5.7 (37)	def. by	West Adelaide 6.5 (41)	Adelaide Oval (crowd: 4,400)

=== Second semi-final ===
	1915 SAFL second semi-final
Saturday, 11 September 1915	South Adelaide 2.6 (18)	def. by	Sturt 5.4 (34)	Adelaide Oval

=== Final ===
	1915 SAFL final
Saturday, 18 September 1915	West Adelaide 2.13 (25)	def. by	Sturt 7.3 (45)	Adelaide Oval (crowd: 7,500)

=== Grand final ===
1915 SAFL Grand Final
Saturday, 2 October 1915	Port Adelaide	def. by	Sturt	Adelaide Oval (crowd: 13,000)
3.1 (19); 3.4 (22); 4.5 (29); 4.10 (34)	Q1; Q2; Q3; Final	2.1 (13); 3.5 (23); 6.7 (43); 6.10 (46)	Umpires: Reynolds
Congear 2, Andersen, Oliver	Goals	Noal 5, Hicks
Ashley, Eaton, Robertson, Channon, Congear,	Best	Noal, Kappler, Ryan, Rayner, Hicks, Limb, Nicol, Sharp
