= 1913 SAFL season =

1913 season of SANFL

1913 SAFL premiership season
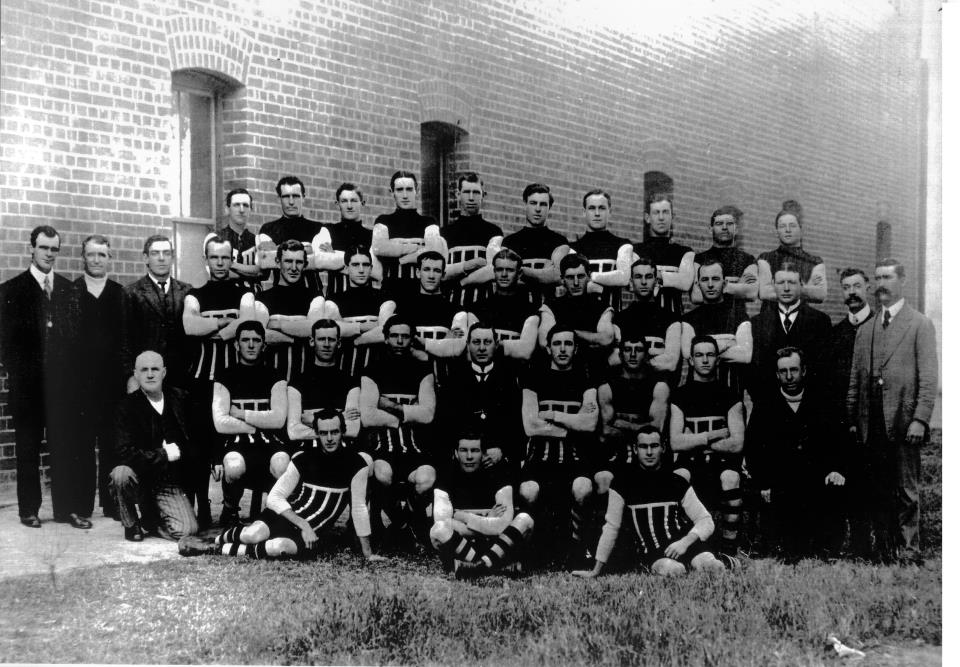
- 36th SAFL season Pictured above is the 1913 Port Adelaide premiership team.
- Teams: 7
- Premiers: Port Adelaide; 7th premiership
- Minor premiers: Port Adelaide; 10th minor premiership
- Magarey Medallist: Tom Leahy; North Adelaide
- Leading goalkicker: Frank Hansen; Port Adelaide (39 goals)
- Matches played: 45
- Highest: 22,000 (Grand Final, Port Adelaide vs. North Adelaide)

The 1913 South Australian Football League season was the 37th season of the top-level Australian rules football competition in South Australia. It saw Port Adelaide win the minor premiership with a 10–2 record – its least impressive minor round record since 1909 – win the premiership without requiring a challenge final, and comfortably defeat VFL premier Fitzroy to win its second Championship of Australia. As they had done in 1910, Port Adelaide toured Western Australia, but this time without a few key players including Hansen, new captain Londrigan, and Oliver, lost against East Fremantle and Subiaco in wet conditions.

== Attempts at an eighth club to remove bye ==
Because the SAFL constitution provided for an eight-club competition, but only seven clubs had actually competed since 1901, there had long been pressure to admit an eighth club.

=== Gawler admission and withdrawal ===
When Mr. E. Johns Senior a delegate from North Adelaide was transferred to Gawler by the Postal Department he was soon elected to chairman and became instrumental in the Gawler Football Association applying for admission to the South Australia Football League.

On 2 December 1912, the South Australian Football League granted Gawler admission to the senior competition in Adelaide as the eighth club, whose zone would cover the Electoral District of Barossa. Its colours were registered as follows: Black jersey with pink hoop, white knickers and black-and-pink hose. However, just before the start of the 1913 season Gawler withdrew due to loss of a number of prominent players from the district and the depressed condition of the sport locally.

=== University application rejected again ===
The University Club, premiers of the Amateur League, again applied for affiliation with the league to fill the vacant eighth berth. On the motion of Mr J. J. Woods, seconded by Mr. A. W. Barry, it was decided that the application should be refused. Adelaide University had previously applied and was rejected in 1910.

== Minor round ==
=== Round 1 ===
	Round 1
Saturday, 3 May 1913	North Adelaide 3.3 (21)	def. by	West Adelaide 8.14 (62)	Adelaide Oval
Saturday, 3 May 1913	West Torrens 6.8 (44)	def. by	Sturt 10.15 (75)	Hindmarsh Oval
Saturday, 3 May 1913	Norwood 8.8 (56)	def. by	South Adelaide 8.11 (59)	Norwood Oval
	Bye; Port Adelaide
Port Adelaide toured Murray Bridge during this opening week.

=== Round 2 ===
	Round 2
Saturday, 10 May 1913	North Adelaide 9.11 (65)	def.	Norwood 3.10 (28)	Adelaide Oval
Monday, 12 May 1913	South Adelaide 8.4 (52)	def.	Sturt 5.9 (39)	Adelaide Oval
Monday, 12 May 1913	West Torrens 5.18 (48)	def. by	Port Adelaide 13.17 (95)	Hindmarsh Oval
	Bye; West Adelaide

=== Round 3 ===
	Round 3
Saturday, 17 May 1913	South Adelaide 6.9 (45)	def.	West Torrens 0.8 (8)	Adelaide Oval
Saturday, 17 May 1913	Port Adelaide 10.11 (71)	def.	Norwood 5.2 (32)	Alberton Oval
Saturday, 17 May 1913	Sturt 8.12 (60)	def.	West Adelaide 5.12 (42)	Unley Oval
	Bye; North Adelaide
West Torrens score of 0.8 (8) was the last instance of a team being held goalless until 2021.

=== Round 4 ===
	Round 4
Saturday, 24 May 1913	South Adelaide 4.12 (36)	def. by	Port Adelaide 11.11 (77)	Adelaide Oval
Saturday, 24 May 1913	Norwood 5.10 (40)	def. by	West Adelaide 5.16 (46)	Norwood Oval
Saturday, 24 May 1913	Sturt 11.9 (75)	def.	North Adelaide 4.15 (39)	Unley Oval
	Bye; West Torrens

=== Round 5 ===
	Round 5
Saturday, 31 May 1913	West Adelaide 8.9 (57)	def.	West Torrens 3.10 (28)	Adelaide Oval
Saturday, 31 May 1913	South Adelaide 9.17 (71)	def.	North Adelaide 8.4 (52)	Jubilee
Saturday, 31 May 1913	Sturt 9.13 (67)	def.	Port Adelaide 4.5 (29)	Unley Oval
	Bye; Norwood

=== Round 6 ===
	Round 6
Saturday, 7 June 1913	North Adelaide 10.9 (69)	def.	West Torrens 2.6 (18)	Adelaide Oval
Monday, 9 June 1913	West Adelaide 4.8 (32)	def. by	Port Adelaide 7.5 (47)	Adelaide Oval
Monday, 9 June 1913	Norwood 3.12 (30)	def. by	Sturt 6.11 (47)	Norwood Oval
	Bye; South Adelaide

=== Round 7 ===
	Round 7
Saturday, 14 June 1913	North Adelaide 8.13 (61)	def.	Port Adelaide 6.9 (45)	Adelaide Oval
Saturday, 14 June 1913	West Torrens 9.11 (65)	def.	Norwood 8.12 (60)	Hindmarsh Oval
Saturday, 14 June 1913	West Adelaide 11.9 (75)	def.	South Adelaide 7.11 (53)	Jubilee
	Bye; Sturt

=== Round 8 ===
	Round 8
Saturday, 21 June 1913	Port Adelaide 13.9 (87)	def.	Norwood 7.9 (51)	Adelaide Oval
Monday, 23 June 1913	West Adelaide 4.15 (39)	def.	Sturt 4.4 (28)	Adelaide Oval
Monday, 23 June 1913	West Torrens 11.8 (74)	def.	South Adelaide 5.16 (46)	Hindmarsh Oval
	Bye; North Adelaide

=== Round 9 ===
	Round 9
Saturday, 28 June 1913	North Adelaide 5.10 (40)	def.	Sturt 4.9 (33)	Adelaide Oval
Saturday, 28 June 1913	Port Adelaide 7.7 (49)	def.	South Adelaide 4.15 (39)	Alberton Oval
Saturday, 28 June 1913	West Adelaide 7.17 (59)	def.	Norwood 8.7 (55)	Jubilee
	Bye; West Torrens

=== Round 10 ===
	Round 10
Saturday, 5 July 1913	South Adelaide 8.6 (54)	def. by	North Adelaide 8.10 (58)	Adelaide Oval
Saturday, 5 July 1913	Port Adelaide 9.11 (65)	def.	Sturt 6.5 (41)	Alberton Oval
Saturday, 5 July 1913	West Torrens 8.6 (54)	def. by	West Adelaide 7.15 (57)	Hindmarsh Oval
	Bye; Norwood

=== Round 11 ===
	Round 11
Saturday, 19 July 1913	West Torrens 6.11 (47)	def. by	North Adelaide 11.9 (75)	Hindmarsh Oval
Saturday, 19 July 1913	Sturt 7.8 (50)	def. by	Norwood 8.9 (57)	Unley Oval
Saturday, 30 August 1913	West Adelaide 7.10 (52)	def. by	Port Adelaide 10.12 (72)	Adelaide Oval
	Bye; South Adelaide
Port Adelaide's game with West Torrens was played after the last round to allow for Port Adelaide's tour of Western Australia.

=== Port Adelaide tour of Western Australia ===
East Fremantle v Port Adelaide
Saturday, 12 July 1913	East Fremantle	def.	Port Adelaide	Subiaco Oval
1.2 (8); 5.5 (35); 6.5 (41); 7.6 (48)	Q1; Q2; Q3; Final	1.6 (12); 2.7 (19); 3.11 (29); 5.12 (42)
Brown 3, Hesketh 2, Charles Doig, Turnbull	Goals	Watson 2, Congear, Hosking, Chaplin
Sharpe, Heinrichs, N. Wrightson, Dix, Charles Doig, Brown, Riley, Truscott, Hesketh	Best	Maynard, Ashley, McFarlane, Watson, Congear, Chaplin

Subiaco v Port Adelaide
Wednesday, 16 July 1913	Subiaco	def.	Port Adelaide	WACA Ground
3.3 (21); 4.4 (28); 5.7 (37); 8.14 (62)	Q1; Q2; Q3; Final	2.1 (13); 2.4 (16); 3.7 (25); 3.7 (25)
Limb 4, Orr 3, Cain	Goals	Magor, Chaplin (Note: The kicker of Port's third goal was not recognised by observers)
Diprose, Cain, Matson, Scaddan, Short, Thomas	Best	Ashley, O'Grady, Maynard, Congear, Chaplin
Injuries	Middleton (fractured nose)

Combined WAFL v Port Adelaide
Saturday, 19 July 1913	Combined WAFL	def. by	Port Adelaide	Fremantle Oval (crowd: 9,000 est.)
0.3 (3); 4.4 (28); 5.5 (35); 6.10 (46)	Q1; Q2; Q3; Final	3.4 (22); 4.8 (32); 10.14 (74); 11.19 (85)
Matson 2, Hesketh 2, Halliday 2	Goals	Congear 4, Magor 2, Ashley, Linklater, Dickson, Watson, Chaplin
Balme, Matson, Banks, Truscott, Sullivan	Best	Ashley, Magor, Congear, Watson, Chaplin, Linklater

=== Round 12 ===
	Round 12
Saturday, 26 July 1913	South Adelaide 3.8 (26)	def.	Norwood 3.5 (23)	Adelaide Oval
Saturday, 26 July 1913	West Adelaide 13.10 (88)	def.	North Adelaide 5.9 (39)	Jubilee
Saturday, 26 July 1913	Sturt 8.8 (56)	def.	West Torrens 2.8 (20)	Unley Oval
	Bye; Port Adelaide

=== Round 13 ===
	Round 13
Saturday, 2 August 1913	South Adelaide 7.1 (43)	def. by	West Adelaide 6.10 (46)	Adelaide Oval
Saturday, 2 August 1913	Port Adelaide 12.18 (90)	def.	North Adelaide 2.8 (20)	Alberton Oval
Saturday, 2 August 1913	Norwood 4.12 (36)	def. by	West Torrens 5.11 (41)	Norwood Oval
	Bye; Sturt

=== Round 14 ===
	Round 14
Saturday, 9 August 1913	Sturt 12.12 (84)	def.	South Adelaide 7.8 (50)	Unley Oval
Saturday, 23 August 1913	Port Adelaide 9.22 (76)	def.	West Torrens 3.6 (24)	Alberton Oval
Saturday, 23 August 1913	Norwood 9.15 (69)	def.	North Adelaide 9.8 (62)	Norwood Oval
	Bye; West Adelaide

== Ladder ==
1913 SAFL Ladder
Pos	Team	Pld	W	L	D	PF	PA	PP	Pts
1	Port Adelaide (P)	12	10	2	0	803	501	61.58	20
2	West Adelaide	12	9	3	0	655	540	54.81	18
3	Sturt	12	7	5	0	655	507	56.37	14
4	North Adelaide	12	6	6	0	599	680	46.83	12
5	South Adelaide	12	5	7	0	574	641	47.24	10
6	West Torrens	12	3	9	0	471	747	38.67	6
7	Norwood	12	2	10	0	537	678	44.20	4

Rules for classification: 1) points; 2) percentage; 3) number of points for.
(P) Premiers

== Major round ==
=== First semi-final ===
1913 SAFL first semi-final
Saturday, 6 September 1913	Port Adelaide	def.	Sturt	Adelaide Oval (crowd: 10,500)
4.2 (26); 5.5 (35); 6.5 (41); 7.8 (50)	Q1; Q2; Q3; Final	1.1 (7); 2.5 (17); 3.6 (24); 4.7 (31)	Umpires: Hickey
Hansen 3, Drummond 2, Watson, Crowley	Goals	Golding 2, Robinson, Smith
Hosking, Ashley, Crowley, Oliver, Eaton, Boon, Chaplin, Maynard, Londrigan	Best	Geinrichs, Miller, Mayman, Robinson, Nicolle, Bamnigan, Hal, McDougall

=== Second semi-final ===
1913 SAFL second semi-final
Saturday, 13 September 1913	West Adelaide	def. by	North Adelaide	Adelaide Oval (crowd: 12,000)
0.3 (3); 1.4 (10); 3.5 (23); 3.6 (24)	Q1; Q2; Q3; Final	2.5 (17); 4.7 (31); 7.9 (51); 8.14 (62)	Umpires: Carter
Hale, Dowling, Oakley	Goals	Lewis 3, O'Brien 2, Johns 2, Threadgold
Head, Baker, Arthur Conlin, Alec Conlin, Dowling	Best	Leahy, Klose, Thomas, Tuckey, Le Messurier, O'Brien, Threadgold, Wainwright, Lewis
West's weakness in the ruck against former Blood Leahy ensures the two-time defending premiers, lacking first-choice followers Moore and Dwyer, have no chance whatsoever

=== Final ===
1913 SAFL Final (Note: This is usually referred to as the grand final, although the winner possessed a right to challenge if defeated)
Saturday, 20 September (3:15 pm)	Port Adelaide	def.	North Adelaide	Adelaide Oval (crowd: 22,000)
3.1 (19); 6.4 (40); 6.9 (45); 7.12 (54)	Q1; Q2; Q3; Final	1.4 (10); 2.4 (16); 2.4 (16); 5.10 (40)	Umpires: Carter
F. Hansen 3, W. Oliver 2, W. Ashby, A. Congear	Goals	Wainwright 2, T. Leahy, Lewis, Johns
H. Eaton, J. Robertson, W. Boon, W. Ashby, J. Dickson, A. McFarlane	Best	T. Leahy, Le Messurier, O'Brien, Wainwright, Johns, Secombe, McKail, Thomas, Pratten, Klise, Tuckey

== Championship of Australia ==
1913 Championship of Australia
Wednesday, 8 October 1913	Port Adelaide	def.	Fitzroy	Adelaide Oval (crowd: 6,000)
1.5 (11); 2.7 (19); 8.12 (60); 13.16 (94)	Q1; Q2; Q3; Final	1.1 (7); 3.5 (23); 3.6 (24); 4.7 (31)	Umpires: Carter
Congear 4, Hansen 2, Chaplin 2, Oliver, Dickson, Drummond, Ashley, Watson	Goals	Freake 2, Lethbridge, Parratt
Drummond, Congear, Tapping, Maynard, Pope, Ashley, Hosking, Eaton, Robertson, Oliver, Londrigan, Hosking	Best	Lethbridge, Holden, Cooper, Freake, Johnson, Martin
A Fitzroy team missing six key players from its grand final team was overrun after half time in hot, dusty 88.0 °F (31.1 °C) weather with dust jumping from the turf
