= Sinclair Dickson =

Australian rules footballer

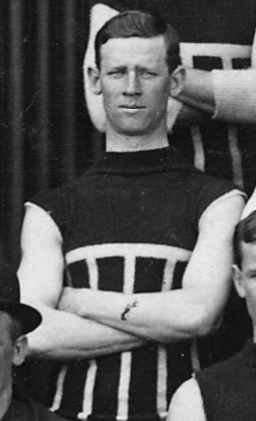

Personal information
- Full name: James Sinclair Dickson
- Nickname: Sinc
- Born: 2 March 1884; Goolwa, South Australia
- Died: 3 January 1961 (aged 76)
- Original team: Semaphore Central
- Position: Ruck Rover

Playing career
Years	Club	Games (Goals)
1906-1913	Port Adelaide	102 (38)

Representative team honours
Years	Team	Games (Goals)
1908-1910	South Australia	7

Career highlights
- 2x Champion of Australia (1910, 1913); 3x Port Adelaide premiership player (1906, 1910, 1913); 2x Port Adelaide best and fairest (1908, 1909); Port Adelaide Life Member (1928); Magarey Medal runner up (1909)

James Sinclair Dickson (2 March 1884 – 3 January 1961) was an Australian rules footballer for the Port Adelaide Football Club.

== Football ==
Sinclair Dickson was a member of three Port Adelaide premiership teams in the South Australian Football League. He also won the Port Adelaide best and fairest in consecutive years in 1908 and 1909. Sinclair Dickson was runner up for the 1909 Magarey Medal. Dickson represented South Australia on seven occasions between 1908 and 1910.

Sinclair Dickson served as the treasurer of the Port Adelaide Football Club during the 1920s. In 1924 Sinclair Dickson took part in a charity match that pitted retired champions against a league eighteen of mostly current state carnival players with the former side winning. In 1928 Sinclair Dickson was made a life member of the Port Adelaide Football Club.

== Outside football ==
In the 1930s Sinclair Dickson was the president of the Alberton Bowling Club.

== Family ==
The son of William Dickson, and Helen Dickson, née Sinclair, James Sinclair Dickson was born at Goolwa, South Australia on 2 March 1884.

He married Muriel Mary Playfair (-1928) on 11 October 1910.

== See also ==
- 1908 Melbourne Carnival
