= 1913 Championship of Australia =

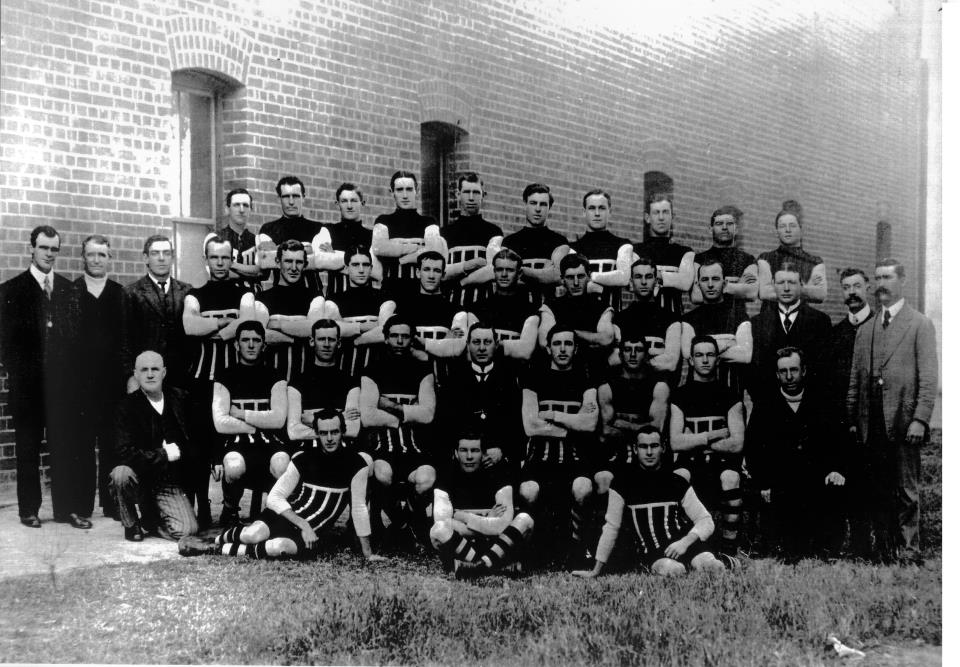
Port Adelaide	Fitzroy
13.16 (94)	4.7 (31)
	1	2	3	4
PTA	1.5 (11)	2.7 (19)	8.12 (60)	13.16 (94)
FTR	1.1 (7)	3.5 (23)	3.6 (24)	4.7 (31)
- Date: Saturday, 3 October
- Stadium: Adelaide Oval
- Attendance: 6,000

The 1913 Championship of Australia was an Australian rules football match that took place on 8 October 1913.

The championship was contested by the premiers of the VFL, Fitzroy and the premiers of the SAFL, Port Adelaide.

The match was played at Adelaide Oval in Adelaide, South Australia.

The match, played in front of 6,000, was won by Port Adelaide by a margin of 63 points, giving Port Adelaide its 3rd Championship of Australia Title.

== Match details ==
Championship of Australia
8 October 1913	Port Adelaide	def.	Fitzroy	Adelaide Oval (crowd: 6,000)
1.5 (11); 2.7 (19); 8.12 (60); 13.16 (94)	Q1; Q2; Q3; Final	1.1 (7); 3.5 (23); 3.6 (24); 4.7 (31)	Umpires: S Carter
A Congear 5 A Chaplin, F Hansen 2 S Dickson, W Drummond, J Ashley, W Oliver 1	Goals	J Freake 2 P Parratt, C Lethbridge 1
