= 1910 SAFL season =

34th edition of the South Australian Football League

1910 SAFL premiership season
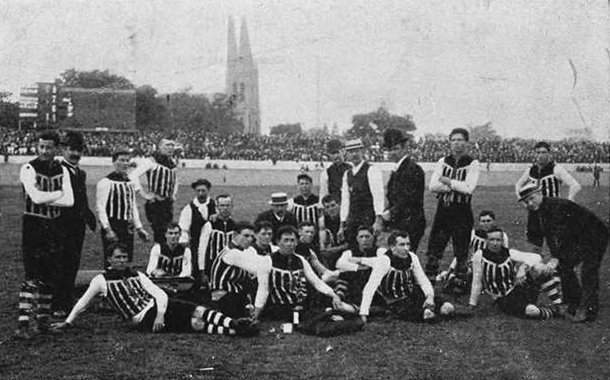
- 34th SAFL season Pictured above is the 1910 SAFL premiers Port Adelaide.
- Teams: 7
- Premiers: Port Adelaide; 6th premiership
- Minor premiers: Sturt; 1st minor premiership
- Magarey Medallist: Sampson Hosking; Port Adelaide
- Leading goalkicker: Frank Hansen; Port Adelaide (46 goals)
- Matches played: 48
- Highest: 22,000 (Final, Sturt vs. Port Adelaide)

The 1910 South Australian Football League season was the 34th season of the top-level Australian rules football competition in South Australia.

During the season there was a brief but sharp decline of reigning premier West Adelaide, who were affected by losing eight players before the season due to an internal upheaval; the club fell to the bottom of the ladder early in the season but recovered somewhat ahead of what would prove to be another rise in 1911. With the establishment in its team of "Dempsey's Immigrants" – a nickname for the group of recruits brought to the club by benefactor John Dempsey, among which were Vic Cumberland, Phil Matson and Bert Renfrey – Sturt won its first minor premiership only two years after having suffered a winless season; Sturt failed in its first grand final against the Port Adelaide, who won its sixth SAFL premiership and, by defeating Collingwood, its second Championship of Australia. Port Adelaide also made the first interstate trip by an SAFL club, when they visited Western Australia for three weeks after 23 July, and began a five-season streak of domiance which ultimately resulted in finishing as Australian champions three times.

For this season only, the league modified its schedule by adding a qualifying round, in which, for premiership points, the first-placed team after twelve games played the second team and the third played the fourth to determine positions for the major round proper. This was not viewed as a success as attendances fell even with the extra two games. There was an umpires' strike which resulted in umpire Noseda, brought across from Victoria, controlling all finals games.

== Minor round ==
=== Round 1 ===
	Round 1
Saturday, 14 May 1910	West Adelaide 7.8 (50)	def. by	Norwood 11.12 (78)	Adelaide Oval
Saturday, 14 May 1910	Port Adelaide 8.10 (58)	def.	Sturt 7.7 (49)	Alberton Oval
Saturday, 14 May 1910	West Torrens 12.7 (79)	def.	North Adelaide 7.16 (58)	Hindmarsh Oval
	Bye; South Adelaide

=== Round 2 ===
	Round 2
Saturday, 21 May 1910	South Adelaide 6.6 (42)	def. by	Port Adelaide 5.23 (53)	Adelaide Oval
Saturday, 21 May 1910	Norwood 10.15 (75)	def.	North Adelaide 5.9 (39)	Norwood Oval
Saturday, 21 May 1910	Sturt 13.21 (99)	def.	West Torrens 6.2 (38)	Unley Oval
	Bye; West Adelaide

=== Round 3 ===
	Round 3
Saturday, 28 May 1910	South Adelaide 4.5 (29)	def. by	Norwood 12.20 (92)	Adelaide Oval
Saturday, 28 May 1910	West Adelaide 4.7 (31)	def. by	West Torrens 10.16 (76)	Jubilee Oval
Saturday, 28 May 1910	Sturt 6.9 (45)	def.	North Adelaide 5.5 (35)	Unley Oval
	Bye; Port Adelaide

=== Round 4 ===
	Round 4
Saturday, 4 June 1910	South Adelaide 2.10 (22)	def. by	North Adelaide 8.13 (61)	Adelaide Oval
Saturday, 4 June 1910	West Torrens 11.16 (82)	def.	Norwood 8.18 (66)	Hindmarsh Oval
Monday, 6 June 1910	West Adelaide 7.9 (51)	def. by	Port Adelaide 11.7 (73)	Adelaide Oval
	Bye; Sturt

=== Round 5 ===
	Round 5
Saturday, 11 June 1910	South Adelaide 4.10 (34)	def.	West Adelaide 4.6 (30)	Adelaide Oval
Saturday, 11 June 1910	West Torrens 7.13 (55)	def.	Port Adelaide 7.9 (51)	Hindmarsh Oval
Saturday, 11 June 1910	Norwood 5.11 (41)	def. by	Sturt 12.9 (81)	Norwood Oval
	Bye; North Adelaide

=== Round 6 ===
	Round 6
Saturday, 25 June 1910	South Adelaide 8.4 (52)	def. by	West Torrens 8.5 (53)	Adelaide Oval
Saturday, 25 June 1910	North Adelaide 4.10 (34)	def. by	Port Adelaide 7.13 (55)	Jubilee Oval
Saturday, 25 June 1910	Sturt 14.10 (94)	def.	West Adelaide 8.12 (60)	Unley Oval
	Bye; Norwood

=== Round 7 ===
	Round 7
Monday, 27 June 1910	North Adelaide 2.13 (25)	def. by	West Adelaide 4.5 (29)	Adelaide Oval
Monday, 27 June 1910	Sturt 9.15 (69)	def.	South Adelaide 3.7 (25)	Unley Oval
Saturday, 3 September 1910	Port Adelaide 10.7 (67)	def.	Norwood 6.11 (47)	Adelaide Oval
	Bye; West Torrens
These matches were originally scheduled for 7 May, but were postponed after the death of King Edward VII.

=== Round 8 ===
	Round 8
Saturday, 2 July 1910	Port Adelaide 6.22 (58)	def.	West Adelaide 2.4 (16)	Alberton Oval
Saturday, 2 July 1910	North Adelaide 6.14 (50)	def.	West Torrens 5.13 (43)	Jubilee Oval
Saturday, 2 July 1910	Sturt 5.6 (36)	def.	Norwood 4.10 (34)	Unley Oval
	Bye; South Adelaide

=== Round 9 ===
	Round 9
Saturday, 9 July 1910	Port Adelaide 12.19 (91)	def.	South Adelaide 3.6 (24)	Alberton Oval
Saturday, 9 July 1910	West Adelaide 8.16 (64)	def.	North Adelaide 6.9 (45)	Jubilee Oval
Saturday, 9 July 1910	Norwood 8.14 (62)	def.	West Torrens 6.10 (46)	Norwood Oval
	Bye; Sturt

=== Round 10 ===
	Round 11
Saturday, 16 July 1910	Port Adelaide 7.6 (48)	def.	West Torrens 2.4 (16)	Alberton Oval
Saturday, 16 July 1910	South Adelaide 7.12 (54)	def. by	Sturt 15.3 (93)	Jubilee Oval
Saturday, 16 July 1910	Norwood 3.5 (23)	def. by	West Adelaide 5.17 (47)	Norwood Oval
	Bye; North Adelaide

=== Round 11 ===
	Round 11
Saturday, 23 July 1910	West Adelaide 3.7 (25)	def. by	Sturt 11.4 (70)	Adelaide Oval
Saturday, 23 July 1910	Port Adelaide 9.17 (71)	def.	North Adelaide 5.8 (38)	Alberton Oval
Saturday, 23 July 1910	Norwood 9.12 (66)	def.	South Adelaide 7.7 (49)	Norwood Oval
	Bye; West Torrens

=== Port Adelaide tour of Western Australia ===
East Fremantle v Port Adelaide
Wednesday, 3 August 1910	East Fremantle	def. by	Port Adelaide	WACA Ground
2.1 (13); 2.1 (13); 4.4 (28); 5.4 (34)	Q1; Q2; Q3; Final	2.1 (13); 4.6 (30); 5.8 (38); 6.10 (46)	Umpires: Crapp
Charles Doig 2, Bailey, Robinson, Sweetman	Goals	Hansen 2, Woollard 2, Callinan, Cavanagh
Sharpe, Charles Doig, Parsons, Sweetman, Clive Doig, Craig, C. Wrightson	Best	Oliver, Curnow, Congear, Dewar, Hansen, Magor, Dempster

WAFL v. Port Adelaide
Saturday, 6 August 1910	WAFL	def. by	Port Adelaide	Fremantle Oval (crowd: 6,000 est.)
2.3 (21); 4.8 (32); 4.9 (33); 6.12 (48)	Q1; Q2; Q3; Final	1.4 (10); 1.9 (15); 5.16 (46); 6.17 (53)
Morgans 2, McKenzie, Orr, Rogers, Waugh	Goals	Hansen 2, Oliver 2, Callinan, Mack
Parsons, Hesford, Spence, Oakley, Beswick, Willoughby	Best	Hosking (best on ground), Oliver, Hansen, Magor, Rose, Dempster, Mason
The combined WAFL team failed to get a goal in the dying minutes that could have tied or won a tight match. Reporters saw the Port Adelaide combination as the finest to have ever toured Western Australia

=== Round 12 ===
	Round 12
Saturday, 6 August 1910	North Adelaide 4.7 (31)	def. by	Norwood 5.15 (45)	Adelaide Oval
Saturday, 6 August 1910	West Torrens 12.10 (82)	def. by	Sturt 12.11 (83)	Hindmarsh Oval
Saturday, 6 August 1910	West Adelaide 13.11 (89)	def.	South Adelaide 5.18 (48)	Jubilee Oval
	Bye; Port Adelaide

=== Round 13 ===
	Round 13
Saturday, 20 August 1910	South Adelaide 3.3 (21)	def. by	North Adelaide 5.13 (43)	Adelaide Oval
Saturday, 20 August 1910	West Torrens 8.13 (61)	drew with	West Adelaide 8.13 (61)	Hindmarsh Oval
Saturday, 20 August 1910	Sturt 7.12 (54)	def. by	Port Adelaide 9.4 (58)	Unley Oval
	Bye; Norwood

=== Round 14 ===
	Round 14
Saturday, 27 August 1910	North Adelaide 8.6 (54)	def. by	Sturt 11.8 (74)	Adelaide Oval
Saturday, 27 August 1910	West Torrens 13.19 (97)	def.	South Adelaide 8.10 (58)	Hindmarsh Oval
Saturday, 27 August 1910	Norwood 9.9 (63)	def. by	Port Adelaide 10.7 (67)	Norwood Oval
	Bye; West Adelaide

=== Qualifying Round ===
	Qualifying Round
Saturday, 10 September 1910	Port Adelaide 3.7 (25)	def. by	Sturt 5.7 (37)	Adelaide Oval
Saturday, 10 September 1910	Norwood 9.16 (70)	def.	West Torrens 7.10 (52)	Jubilee Oval

== Ladder ==
1910 SAFL Ladder
Pos	Team	Pld	W	L	D	PF	PA	PP	Pts
1	Sturt	13	11	2	0	884	589	60.01	22
2	Port Adelaide (P)	13	11	2	0	775	526	59.57	22
3	Norwood	13	7	6	0	750	676	52.59	14
4	West Torrens	13	6	6	1	780	789	49.71	13
5	West Adelaide	12	4	7	1	553	673	45.11	9
6	North Adelaide	12	3	9	0	513	623	45.16	6
7	South Adelaide	12	1	11	0	458	837	35.37	2

Rules for classification: 1) points; 2) percentage; 3) number of points for.
(P) Premiers

== Major round ==
=== First semi-final ===
1910 SAFL first semi-final
Saturday, 17 September	Port Adelaide	def.	West Torrens	Adelaide Oval
2.2 (14); 4.7 (31); 5.13 (43); 9.13 (67)	Q1; Q2; Q3; Final	3.2 (20); 3.3 (21); 4.7 (31); 7.9 (51)	Umpires: Noseda
Hansen 6, Woollard, Congear, Pope	Goals	Adcock 2, Wainwright 2, Waye, Smith, Drummond
McFarlane, Mason, Magor, Cocks, Congear, Curnow, Callinan, Hansen	Best	Gluyas, Geddes, Adcock, Wainwright, Smith, Kersley, Willett, Muller

=== Second semi-final ===
1910 SAFL second semi-final
Saturday, 24 September	Sturt	def.	Norwood	Adelaide Oval (crowd: 9,000 est.)
2.4 (16); 5.6 (36); 8.9 (57); 8.9 (57)	Q1; Q2; Q3; Final	2.1 (13); 3.3 (21); 5.7 (37); 6.13 (49)	Umpires: Noseda
Golding 3, Osborn 2, H. Limb, Cumberland, Wickens	Goals	W. Miller 3, Chamberlain 2, Buist
Walsh, Hewett, Londrigan, McDougall, Cumberland, A. Limb	Best	Robin, Bennett, Mitchell, H. Miller, Lewis

=== Final ===
1910 SAFL final
Saturday, 1 October	Sturt	def. by	Port Adelaide	Adelaide Oval (crowd: 22,000)
3.3 (21); 4.7 (31); 5.8 (38); 6.9 (45)	Q1; Q2; Q3; Final	1.5 (11); 2.6 (18); 5.8 (38); 6.13 (49)	Umpires: Noseda
Golding 3, Cumberland 2, H. Limb	Goals	Hansen 3, Congear 2, Magor

=== Grand final ===
1910 SAFL Grand Final
Saturday, 8 October	Sturt	def. by	Port Adelaide	Adelaide Oval (crowd: 20,000)
0.4 (4); 2.6 (18); 4.7 (31); 5.11 (41)	Q1; Q2; Q3; Final	1.5 (11); 2.8 (20); 6.11 (47); 8.12 (60)	Umpires: Noseda
Golding 2, Dunne, Wickens, Bannigan	Goals	Hansen 2, Curnow 2, Dickson, Woollard, Dewar, Oliver
Walsh, Renfrey, Cumberland, Heinrichs, A. Limb, Golding, Dunne	Best	Curnow, Hosking, Oliver, Magor, Dickson, Congear, Middleton, Dewar

== Championship of Australia ==
1910 Championship of Australia
Saturday, 15 October	Port Adelaide	def.	Collingwood	Adelaide Oval (crowd: 8,000 est.)
3.6 (24); 4.11 (35); 9.15 (69); 15.20 (110)	Q1; Q2; Q3; Final	2.1 (13); 5.4 (34); 6.7 (43); 7.9 (51)	Umpires: Elder
Oliver 5, Hansen 4, Woollard 3, McFarlane, Hosking, Curnow	Goals	Lee 3, Hughes, Jones, Gilchrist, Lumsden
Dickson, Oliver, Cocks, McFarlane, Dempster, Curnow, Congear, Dewar, Hosking	Best
On a very warm 82.4 °F (28.0 °C) day, Collingwood, without a match for two weeks and lacking several premiership players, was completely outplayed after half-time by Port Adelaide's highly systematic attacking play. There were major complaints about the lack of public interest.
