= 1910 SAFL Grand Final =

- Vic Cumberland (left) of Sturt and Sampson Hosking (right) of Port Adelaide on Adelaide Oval before the 1910 SAFL Grand Final.

Port Adelaide	Sturt
8.12 (60)	5.11 (41)
	1	2	3	4
PTA	1.5 (11)	2.8 (20)	6.11 (47)	8.12 (60)
STU	0.4 (4)	2.6 (18)	4.7 (27)	5.11 (41)
- Date: Saturday, 1 October (2:50 pm)
- Stadium: Adelaide Oval
- Attendance: 20,000

The 1910 SAFL Grand Final was an Australian rules football championship match. Port Adelaide beat Sturt 60 to 41 to claim the 1910 SAFL season premiership.
