= Sheffield (running) =

Running event in England

The Sheffield is a running event over 130 yards (118.872 meters). The discipline is said to have originated in the town of Sheffield in England with contestants running from one pub to another pub in the town 130 yards away. The event is reported to have been first held in Sheffield in the early 1860s.
