= Joseph Watson (footballer) =

Australian rules footballer

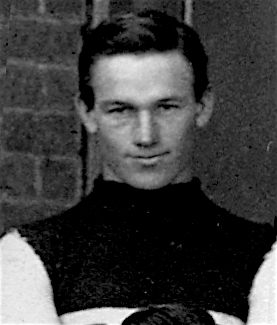

Personal information
- Full name: Joseph Charles Watson
- Nickname: Joe
- Died: 12 May 1917 (aged 23–24); France

Playing career
Years	Club	Games (Goals)
1911, 1913-1914	Port Adelaide	36 (19)

Representative team honours
Years	Team	Games (Goals)
1914	South Australia	5

Career highlights
- 2x Championship of Australia (1913, 1914); 2x Port Adelaide premiership player (1913, 1914)

Joseph Charles Watson was an Australian rules footballer.

He served with the 10th Battalion, seeing combat at Gallipoli and in France, but dying from wounds in May 1917.
