= 1933 SANFL Grand Final =

1933 Australian football competition

| West Torrens | Norwood |
|---|---|
| 13.10 (88) | 9.11 (65) |
| | 1 | 2 | 3 | 4 |
|---|---|---|---|---|
| WT | 3.2 (20) | 8.3 (51) | 9.5 (59) | 13.10 (88) |
| NOR | 4.5 (29) | 6.5 (41) | 8.8 (56) | 9.11 (65) |
- Date: Saturday, 14 October (2:10 pm)
- Stadium: Adelaide Oval
- Attendance: 33,444

The 1933 SANFL Grand Final was an Australian rules football competition. West Torrens beat Norwood 88 to 65.
