= Frank Hansen (Australian footballer) =

Australian rules footballer

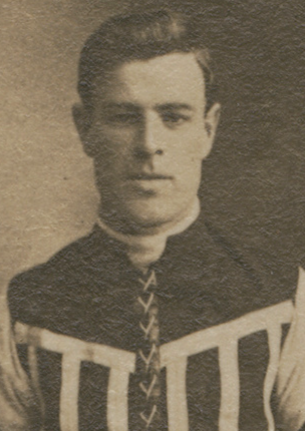
- Hansen in 1910

Personal information
- Full name: Francis Ivor Hansen
- Born: 4 February 1884; Adelaide, South Australia
- Died: 5 May 1975 (aged 91)
- Position: Full Forward

Playing career
Years	Club	Games (Goals)
1903–1909	South Adelaide	
1910–1914	Port Adelaide	60 (168)

Representative team honours
Years	Team	Games (Goals)
1911, 1913	South Australia	7 (19)

Coaching career
Years	Club	Games (W–L–D)
1919–1920	Port Adelaide	26 (14–11–1)

Career highlights
- 2x Championship of Australia team member (1910, 1913); 2x Port Adelaide premiership player (1910, 1913); 3x South Adelaide leading goal kicker (1907, 1908, 1909); 4x Port Adelaide leading goal kicker (1910–1913); 4x SANFL leading goal kicker (1910–1913)

Frank Ivor Hansen (4 February 1884 – 5 May 1975) was an Australian Rules footballer who played for South Adelaide and Port Adelaide in the South Australian Football League.

== Early life ==
He was the son of James Hansen and Briget Neesen, Norwegian and Scottish immigrants.

== South Adelaide ==
Frank Hansen debuted for South Adelaide in the 1903 SAFL season. He would lead the club in goal kicking in 1907 with 24 goals, 1908 with 28 and 1909 with 20.

== Port Adelaide ==
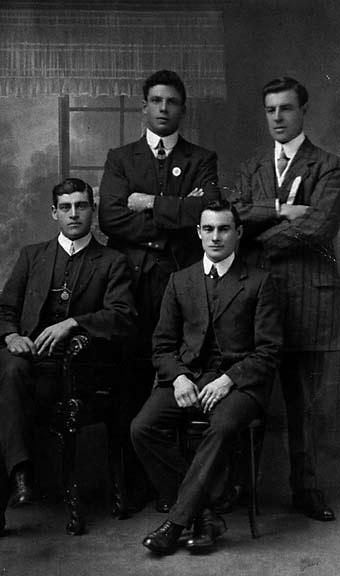
Hansen with fellow Port Adelaide players who represented South Australia in the states victorious National football carnival in 1911 ( Congear, Oliver and Hosking).

He led the competitions goal tally for four consecutive seasons between 1910 and 1913. He would play only one game in 1914 retiring at the age of 29.

== Coaching ==
Frank Hansen was coach of Port Adelaide from 1919–1923 in varying capacities.

== Personal life ==
Frank Hansen married during 1914 and died during 1975 at the age of 91.
