= Clifford Cocks (footballer) =

Australian rules footballer

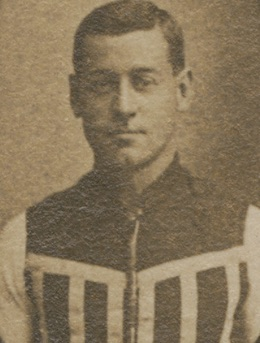

Personal information
- Full name: Clifford Trevelyan Cocks
- Born: 29 November 1883; Exeter, South Australia
- Died: 6 April 1974 (aged 90); South Australia

Playing career
Years	Club	Games (Goals)
1907–1914	Port Adelaide	75

Clifford Trevelyan Cocks (29 November 1883 – 6 April 1974) was an Australian rules footballer for Port Adelaide. He captained the club in 1912.
