= Vic Cumberland =

Australian rules footballer (1877–1927)

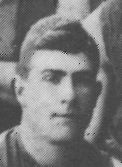

Personal information
- Full name: Harold Vivian Cumberland
- Born: 4 July 1877; Toorak, Victoria
- Died: 15 July 1927 (aged 50); Brighton, Victoria
- Original team: Brighton (Tasmania)
- Height: 6 ft 0 in (182 cm)
- Weight: 13 st 9 lb (86.5 kg)

Playing career^{1}
Years	Club	Games (Goals)
1898–1901	Melbourne	50 (15)
1903–04, 1907–08, 1912–15, 1920	St Kilda	126 (72)
1909–11	Sturt	37 (33)
Total		213 (120)

Representative team honours
Years	Team	Games (Goals)
	Victoria	3 (3)
	South Australia	9
- ^{1} Playing statistics correct to the end of 1920.

Career highlights
- VFL premiership player: 1900; Magarey Medal: 1911; Rick Davies Medal: 1911; Australian Football Hall of Fame; Sturt Team of the Century

Harold Vivian "Vic" Cumberland (4 July 1877 – 15 July 1927), also known as Harry Cumberland, was an Australian rules footballer in the Victorian Football League (VFL) and the South Australian National Football League (SANFL).

== Early life ==
The youngest son of Peregrine and Lillian Cumberland, he was born in Toorak, Victoria, on 4 July 1877. His older, much taller and much heavier brother, Cec Cumberland, played five senior VFL games for Melbourne in 1899 alongside Vic – and, due to his brother's size, weight and seniority, Vic was often referred to as "Little" Cumberland.

== Melbourne (1898 – 1901) ==
Initially playing senior football in Tasmania, Cumberland returned to Victoria and played with VFL club Melbourne from 1898 to 1901. In early 1902, Cumberland was cleared to play in Western Australia, but there is no record of him playing senior football there. He instead played for Collegians in the Metropolitan Junior Football Association (MJFA), including in the club's 1902 grand final victory against Brighton.

== St Kilda (1903 – 1904) ==
In 1903 Cumberland resumed his senior career at VFL club St Kilda and was a leading player over the next two seasons. His presence was one of the factors that enabled St Kilda to rise from bottom of the ladder in a winless 1902 season to narrowly missing the finals in fifth position in 1903.

== Auckland Imperial (1905 – 1906) ==
In 1905 and 1906 Cumberland spent time in New Zealand and played for the Auckland Imperial Football Club in the Australian Football League of Auckland.

== St Kilda (1907 – 1908) ==
After returning to Australia he started a second stint with St Kilda FC and was again widely recognised as one of the leading players in the competition. He was part of the first St Kilda FC team to qualify for the Finals in club history in 1907, playing in the Semi-Final, backed up with a second consecutive Finals series in 1908, where he again played in the Semi-Final.

== Sturt (1909 – 1911) ==
Sampson Hosking (right) standing next to Vic Cumberland (left) of Sturt on Adelaide Oval before the 1910 SAFL Grand Final.

Cumberland moved to South Australia in 1909 and played with SANFL club Sturt for three seasons, winning the league's Magarey Medal award as the fairest and most brilliant in 1911, his final year with the club. He was also a member that same year of his adopted state's victorious carnival team.

== St Kilda (1912 – 1915; 1920) ==
In 1912 Cumberland returned for a third stint at St Kilda and was a key member of their 1913 VFL Grand Final team, the first St Kilda FC team to qualify for a Grand Final. Although part of a losing side, Cumberland was reported to have been one of his side's better players. He remained a leading player until 1915, when St Kilda was one of the clubs that ceased playing due to World War I.

Cumberland played his last season with St Kilda after returning from war. He was 43 years of age when he finally retired from top-level football, the oldest player ever to have appeared in the VFL.

== Playing style ==
Although only 6 feet 0 inches (182 cm), Cumberland was a natural running ruckman. He was a strong mark and an excellent long kick, especially renowned for his place-kicks, with the skill to grab the ball from the ruck and handpass to a teammate.

== World War I ==
He enlisted to serve in World War I in January 1916 and embarked for France in April. He was part of the 29th Battalion (Australia) and was wounded three times during fighting in France. He returned to Australia in November 1919.

== Death ==
In 1927, Cumberland was involved in an accident when he was riding his motorbike in Ferntree Gully, Victoria, and hit a cow. He died in hospital several months later, on 15 July 1927.
