= Frank Barry (footballer) =

Australian rules footballer

Personal information
- Full name: Francis Martin Barry
- Nickname: Dinky
- Born: 11 August 1892; Adelaide, South Australia
- Died: 19 June 1963 (aged 70); Adelaide, South Australia
- Height: 5 ft 8 in (172 cm)
- Weight: 10 st 12 lb (69 kg)

Playing career^{1}
| Years | Club | Games (Goals) |
| 1911–1915 | South Adelaide | 41 (-) |
- ^{1} Playing statistics correct to the end of 1915.

Career highlights
- Magarey Medal: 1915

Francis Martin Barry (11 August 1892 – 19 June 1963) was an Australian rules footballer who played with South Adelaide in the South Australian Football League (SAFL) from 1911 to 1915.

A rover, Barry was a joint winner of the Magarey Medal in his final league season, and also represented South Australia twice at interstate football. The Great War caused the SAFL to be suspended from 1916 to 1918, and by this stage Barry had travelled overseas to take part on the frontline. Barry never played football again.

In 2019, South Adelaide inaugurated the Frank Barry Medal for the player adjudged best afield in their annual Anzac Round match.
