= 1913 SAFL Grand Final =

Port Adelaide	North Adelaide
7.12 (54)	5.10 (40)
	1	2	3	4
PTA	3.1 (19)	6.4 (40)	6.9 (45)	7.12 (54)
NTH	1.4 (10)	2.4 (18)	3.6 (24)	5.10 (40)
- Date: Saturday, 20 September
- Stadium: Adelaide Oval
- Attendance: 22,000

The 1913 SAFL Grand Final was an Australian rules football competition. Port Adelaide beat North Adelaide by 54 to 40.
