= Tom Leahy (Australian footballer) =

Australian rules footballer

Personal information
- Full name: Thomas Joseph Leahy
- Born: 13 January 1888; Goodwood, South Australia
- Died: 7 May 1964 (aged 76); Adelaide, South Australia
- Height: 193 cm (6 ft 4 in)

Playing career^{1}
Years	Club	Games (Goals)
1905–1909	West Adelaide	58 (21)
1910–1915, 1919-1921	North Adelaide	111 (60)

Representative team honours
Years	Team	Games (Goals)
	South Australia	31

Coaching career
Years	Club	Games (W–L–D)
1922–1924	Norwood	
- ^{1} Playing statistics correct to the end of 1921.

Career highlights
- 3x SANFL Premiership (1908, 1909, 1920); Magarey Medalist: 1913; 3x North Adelaide best and fairest (1911, 1914, 1919); South Australian Football Hall of Fame inductee; 2x Norwood premiership coach (1922, 1923); Australian Football Hall of Fame: Inductee 2023

Thomas Joseph Leahy (13 January 1888 – 7 May 1964) was an Australian rules footballer who played 111 games with North Adelaide and 58 games with West Adelaide in the SAFL.

== Family ==
The son of George Joseph Leahy (1861–1910), and Annie Mary Leahy (1860–1929), née McKenzie, Thomas Joseph Leahy was born at Goodwood, South Australia on 13 January 1888.

He married Agnes Shannon on 29 November 1917.

== Education ==
He was educated at the Christian Brothers College in Wakefield Street, Adelaide. He played football for the school (he was captain of the team), as well as for Albert Park in the (Junior) Adelaide and Suburban Youths' Association competition.

== Football ==
=== West Adelaide ===
The Leahy family lived in Gouger Street in the city and thus Tom was tied to the West Adelaide Football Club under the electorate or district system. Tom and his brother Bernie debuted for West Adelaide on 27 May 1905 against Port Adelaide on the Jubilee Oval. Tom was 17 years and 4 months old at the time. Despite West Adelaide's lowly position in the competition Tom established himself as a ruckman of some note, and made his state debut one year later on 23 June 1906 against Victoria on the Adelaide Oval. He was named in the back pocket and second ruck. He finished the season by being awarded West Adelaide's best and fairest.

In 1908 Jack Reedman who had recently left North Adelaide as a player took the coaching position at West Adelaide and took the side to not only SAFL Premiers but also the club was dubbed Champions of Australia after they defeated VFL Premiers Carlton on the Adelaide Oval by 29 points, on 3 October 1908. Tom had an outstanding season being named in South Australian Carnival Side, and finishing second in the Magarey Medal. West Adelaide went back to back after defeating Port Adelaide in the 1909 SAFL Grand Final by 18 points.

=== North Adelaide ===
A rift in the West Adelaide Football Club at the end of the 1909 season saw Tom and his two brothers, Bernie and Vinnie, seek clearances to North Adelaide. All three lined up for North Adelaide in the first round of 1910, and Bernie was voted Captain of the side by his teammates. In 1911 Tom played a vital role in South Australia's winning side at the 1911 Adelaide Carnival.

After being runner up three times in the Magarey Medal in 1908, 1909 & 1911, Tom finally won the award in 1913. He also led North's Rucks in the Grand Final that year against Port Adelaide. Another fine season followed in 1914 with him taking out North Adelaide's best and fairest award, but he missed a spot in North Adelaide's Grand Final side that year due to a controversial suspension in the finals series. In 1915 Tom was unanimously voted Captain of the side after the retirement of longtime servant of the club Ernie Johns.

From 1916 to 1918 the SAFL went into recess and a Patriotic League was played. Tom didn't play football during these years until 1918 when he joined the West Adelaide patriotic side. Prospect (who was loosely aligned with North Adelaide in this league) had left the competition early in the 1918 season due to lack of numbers. West Adelaide made the Grand Final against the West Torrens Patriotic side, and while West lost to Torrens Tom was named West's best player if not the best player on ground.

In 1919 the SAFL returned and Tom again took up his role as North Adelaide's Captain, as well as the State Captain. Tom again had an outstanding season taking out North's Best and Fairest award and leading the side in what turned out to be a marathon finals series. North played in five games (having drawn two) and fell narrowly at the last hurdle to Sturt by 5 points.1919 SAFL Grand Final. In 1920 North Adelaide, led by Tom Leahy, went one better and took out the Premiership against Norwood 1920 SAFL Grand Final. Tom also captained the South Australian side that took on the Victorian side on the MCG and claimed a rare "away" victory against Victoria, 10-12(72)to 9-11(65).

Tom was again North Captain and State captain in 1921. He retired early in 1922 before the season started, after having played 169 league games.

Leahy represented South Australia at interstate football on 31 occasions during his career, including four carnivals. The only Interstate matches he missed since making his State debut in 1906 was in 1910 when his uncle died, and he missed the Western Australia match in the 1921 Perth Carnival after being injured in the opening match against Victoria. Considering that in four years encompassed by his career (1915–1918) there was no State football at all this number of games is no mean feat.

=== Norwood Coach ===
When his retirement was announced in April 1922 the Norwood Football Club approached him to ask him to coach that side. Tom repaid their faith in him with two premierships in a row (1922 and 1923) and a Grand Final appearance (1924) in his three years as coach there.

== After football ==
After leaving coaching Tom wrote about Football in the Adelaide press. In 1935 he accepted a position on the tribunal which heard charges against reported players, so that he could protect them from unwarranted suspensions. He was belatedly appointed a life member of the South Australian National Football League in 1945 and in 1944-64 was the resident officer at Football House, Hindmarsh Square. In 1946 he helped to form the Past Players and Officials Association.

== Legacy ==
=== North Adelaide Football Club (Team of the Century) ===
In October 2000, Leahy was named in the first ruck in North Adelaide's official "Team of the Century". He was also one of the first twenty inductees into North Adelaide's Hall of Fame in 2015.

=== South Australian Football Hall of Fame ===
In 2002, Leahy was among the inaugural group of 113 inductees into the South Australian Football Hall of Fame.

=== Australian Football Hall of Fame ===
Despite being considered by many as the best ruckman from South Australia in the sport's history, Leahy was for a longtime, absent from the Australian Football Hall of Fame. He was finally inducted in 2023.

== See also ==
- 1908 Melbourne Carnival
- 1911 Adelaide Carnival
- 1914 Sydney Carnival
- 1921 Perth Carnival
