= Jubilee Oval (Adelaide) =

Former sports venue in Adelaide, South Australia

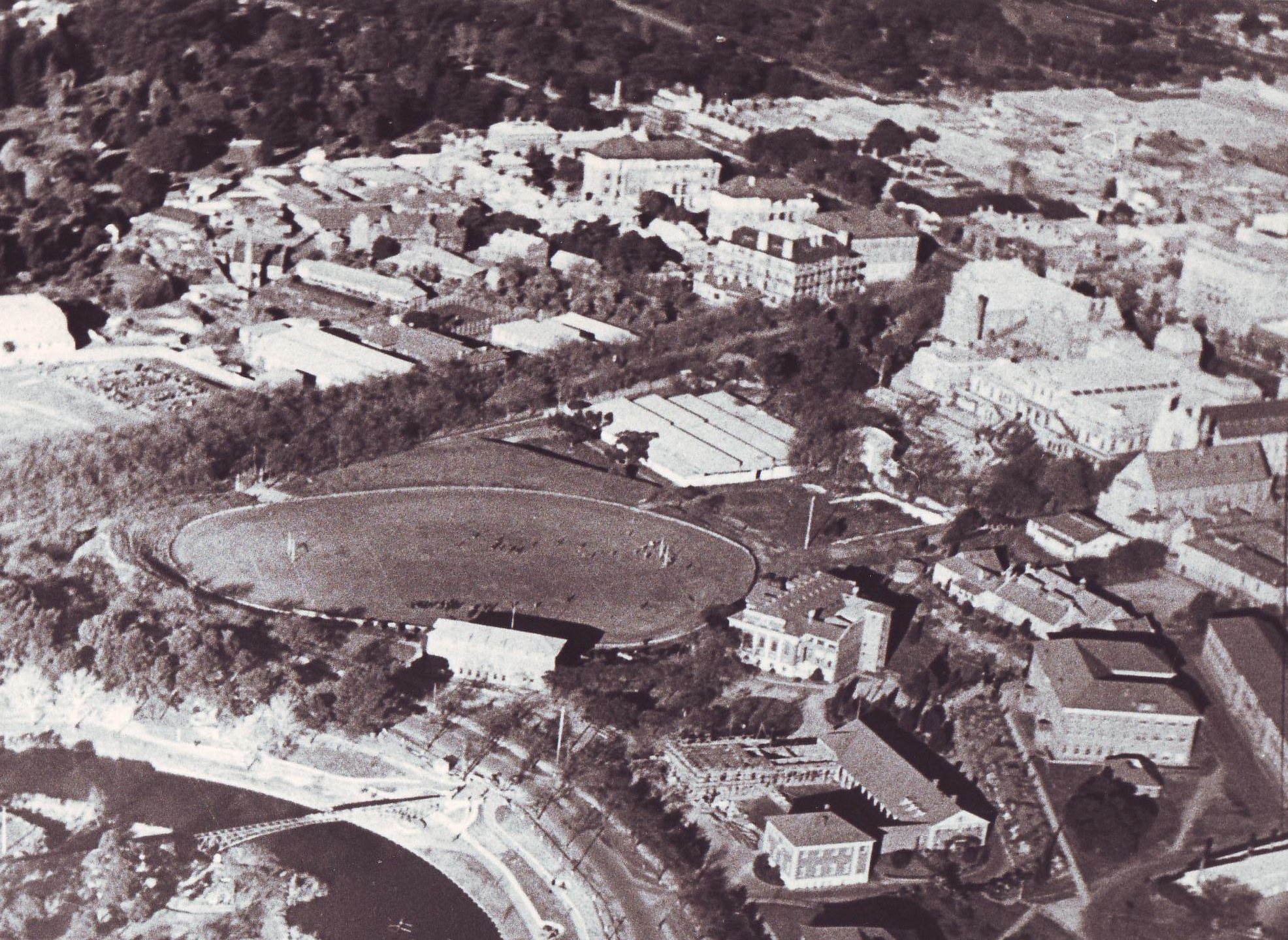
- View of the former Jubilee Oval from an aeroplane (c. 1936)
- Interactive map of Jubilee Oval
- Location: Adelaide, South Australia
- Coordinates: 34°55′06″S 138°36′19″E
- Surface: Grass

Construction
- Groundbreaking: 1894
- Opened: 1895
- Demolished: 1945

Tenants
- North Adelaide Football Club 1898-1901, 1904; Norwood Football Club 1898-1900; West Adelaide Football Club (1898-1906); South Adelaide Football Club Home Ground (1904), Training (1904-1914, 1916-1926)

The Jubilee Oval was a sporting ground created in 1895 between the Jubilee Exhibition Building and the River Torrens. It was located next to the railway station at the end of the Jubilee Exhibition Railway line, which operated from 1887 to 1927. It incorporated a (banked) cycle racing track, and a new grandstand and seating on the mound were built in 1896.

It was created, in part for the Royal Agricultural and Horticultural Society as a venue for the Royal Adelaide Show, replacing their "Old Exhibition Grounds", which had been home to the Show for fifty years. The Autumn Show was held at the Jubilee Building in May 1895, with the horse events being held on the Oval. In 1896 the first Live Stock Show was held at the new site.

The first sporting contest held on the oval may have been the cricket "friendly" between two Government departments: the Land Titles Office and Treasury in February 1895, using a matting wicket. The following month saw a match between two departments of the South Australian Register, though the condition of the ground was hardly conducive to an enjoyable game, a horse show having been held on the oval a week before. The first race on the cycle track took place in July 1895, and was praised, but very few spectators were present.

The first League football match held on the oval was Norwood v. West Adelaide on 7 May 1898.

It also held the 1904 SAFA Grand Final between Port Adelaide and Norwood, with the latter winning the match. This is the only instance where the SANFL premiership grand final was not decided at either Adelaide Oval or Football Park.

The oval was later deemed too small for SA league football, with the last game there being played on July 16, 1921, with South Adelaide defeating West Adelaide.

On Saturday 6 October 1923, Australia played China in an association football match at Jubilee Oval in front of a crowd of approximately 9000 people, with the match finishing in a 2-all draw.

On Saturday 6 October 1924, a football match organised by Sports and Games Committee of Adelaide was played between the Gawler Football Association and a team of Aborigines from Murray and Point Pearce stations. The aboriginal team playing with bare feet won a good game of football by 12.19 to 10.17.

The oval was demolished in 1945 to allow for new buildings for the University of Adelaide.

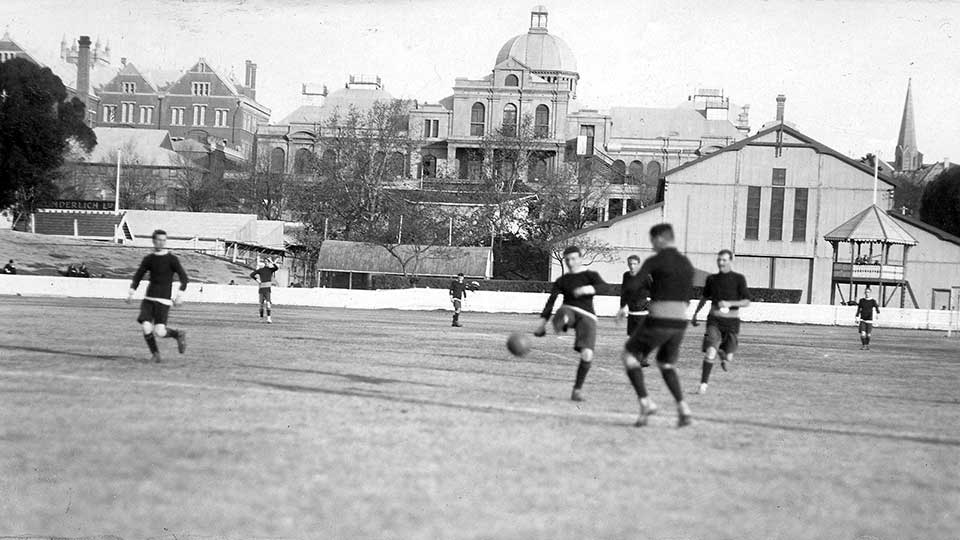
An association football match being played at Jubilee Oval in 1915.

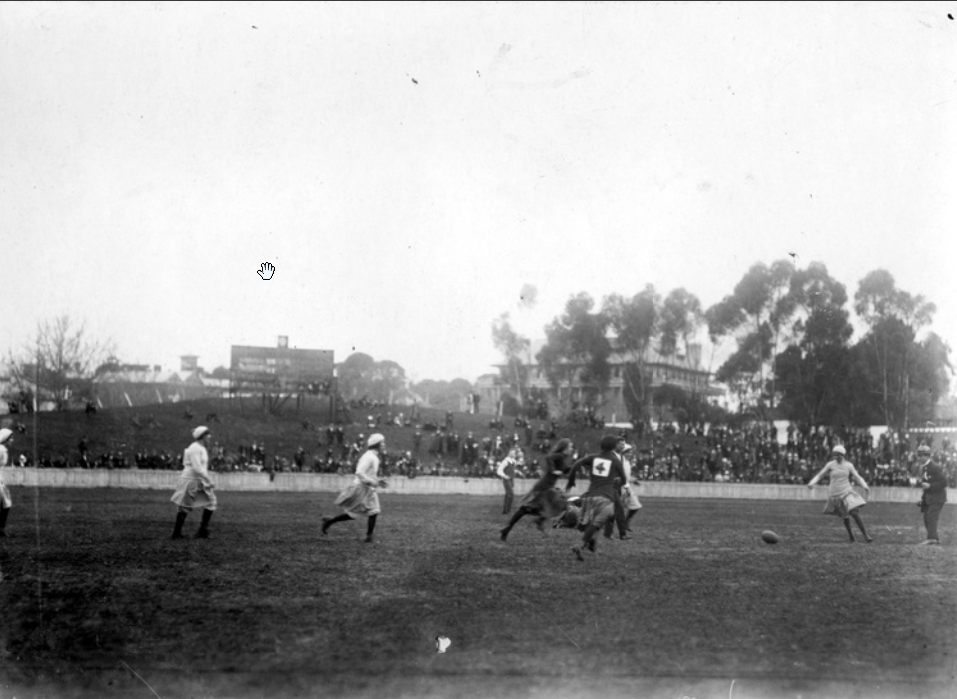
Women's Australian rules football. North vs South. September 21, 1918

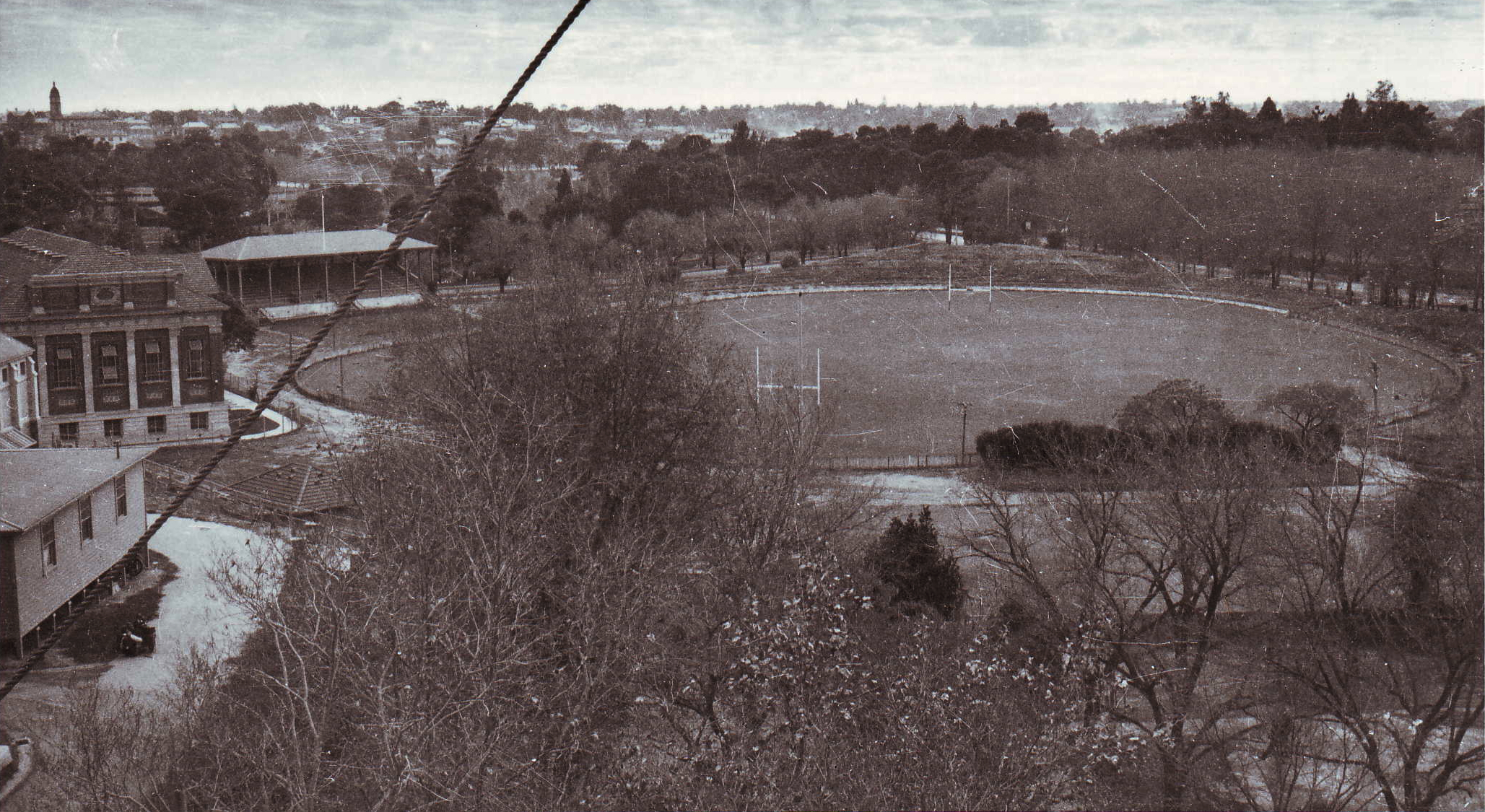
Overlooking Jubilee Oval with the Barr Smith Library to the left (c. 1934)
