= Angelo Congear =

Australian rules footballer

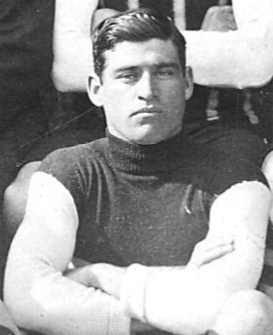
- Congear in 1912

Personal information
- Full name: Angelo Nicholas Goucar Congear
- Nickname: Congy
- Born: 5 May 1885; Glanville, South Australia
- Died: 9 August 1986 (aged 101)
- Original teams: Australs (1902–1906); Semaphore Centrals (1908)
- Position: Rover

Playing career
Years	Club	Games (Goals)
1908–1922	Port Adelaide	160 (222)

Representative team honours
Years	Team	Games (Goals)
1910–1919	South Australia	15 (35)

Career highlights
- Club: 3x Champions of Australia team member (1910, 1913, 1914); 4x Port Adelaide premiership player (1910, 1913, 1914, 1921); 2x Port Adelaide leading goal-kicker (1909, 1915); Representative: 15 games for South Australia; 1911 Carnival series championship (South Australia)

Angelo Nicholas Goucar Congear (5 May 1885 – 9 August 1986) was an Australian rules footballer who played for the Port Adelaide Football Club in the South Australian National Football League between 1908 and 1922.

== Junior football (1902–1908) ==
Congear started playing football in 1902 with the Australs Football Club. In 1908 he started playing for Semaphore Centrals, an affiliate of the Port Adelaide Football Club who he would debut for later that year.

== Port Adelaide (1908–1922) ==
Angelo Congear debuted in Port Adelaide's fifth match of the 1908 SAFL season against Norwood at Adelaide Oval. In front of a then record crowd of 25,000 at Adelaide Oval, Congear would kick a goal on debut but Port Adelaide would end up losing the match by 13 points.

During his career at Port Adelaide he played in seven Grand finals and won three Championships of Australia. Upon his induction into the Port Adelaide Football Club Hall of Fame he was listed as having played over 150 games.

A reporter for the Daily Herald of Adelaide considered him to be the best player during Port Adelaide's 1914 Championship of Australia victory over Fitzroy.

== Reputation ==
Angelo Congear was considered to be one of the finest rovers in South Australia in his era.

== Personal life ==
The Australian-born son of a Greek immigrant father from Kea, Cyclades Islands, Greece, John Angelo Congear, who migrated to Australia in 1861 and lived to be 101 years old. For work Congear would do manual labour on the Port Adelaide wharves, including on the mornings of days he played football.
