= 1910 Championship of Australia =

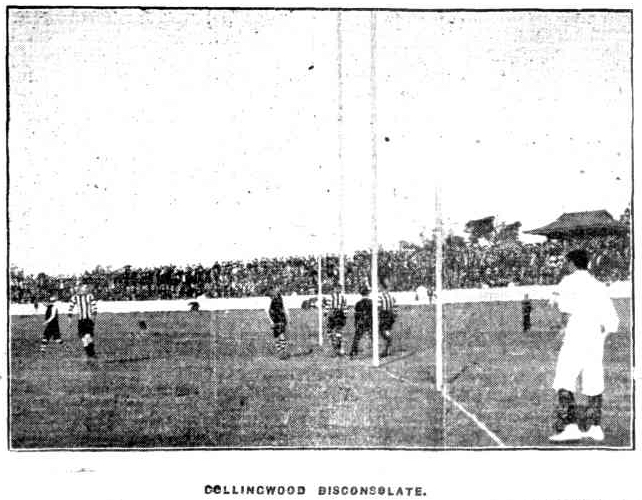
| Port Adelaide | Collingwood |
|---|---|
| 15.20 (110) | 7.9 (51) |
| | 1 | 2 | 3 | 4 |
|---|---|---|---|---|
| PA | 3.6 (24) | 4.11 (35) | 9.15 (69) | 15.20 (110) |
| COL | 2.1 (13) | 5.4 (34) | 6.7 (43) | 7.9 (51) |
- Date: 15 October 1910
- Stadium: Adelaide Oval
- Attendance: 7,000

The 1910 Championship of Australia was an Australian rules football match that took place on 15 October 1910.

The championship was contested by the premiers of the VFL, Collingwood and the premiers of the SAFL, Port Adelaide.

The match was played at Adelaide Oval in Adelaide, South Australia.

To avoid a clash of guernsey designs Port Adelaide offered to wear its jumpers inside out resulting in an "all-black" appearance.

The match, played in front of 7,000, was won by Port Adelaide by a margin of 59 points, giving Port Adelaide its 2nd Championship of Australia Title.

== Teams ==
Port Adelaide
| John Woollard (captain) | Clifford Cocks | Angelo Congear |
| Cecil Curnow | Henry Dewar | Sinclair Dickson |
| Frank Hansen | Sampson Hosking | Frank Magor |
| Harold McEwen | Philip O'Grady | Alex McFarlane |
| Harold Oliver | Horrie Pope | Herman Rose |
| John Middleton | Edward Callinan | George Dempster |
Coach: Archibald Hosie

Collingwood
| Dick Lee (captain) | Jock McHale | Percy Wilson |
| Les Hughes | Dan Minogue | Jim Jackson |
| Percy Gribb | Charlie Norris | Ernie Lumsden |
| Joe Scadden | Marshall Herbert | Paddy Gilchrist |
| Duncan McIvor | Richard Daykin | Horrie Jones |
| Charlie Hackett | Jack Furness | Roy Crisp |
Coach: George Angus

== Scorecard ==
Championship of Australia
15 October 1910 | Port Adelaide | def. | Collingwood | Adelaide Oval (crowd: 7,000)
3.6 (24); 4.11 (35); 9.15 (69); 15.20 (110) | Q1; Q2; Q3; Final | 2.1 (13); 5.4 (34); 6.7 (43); 7.9 (51) | Umpires: Jack Elder
W Oliver 5 F Hansen 4 J Woollard 3 A McFarlane, S Hosking, F Curnow 1 | Goals | D Lee 3 L Hughes, H Jones, P Gilchrist, E Lumsden 1
