= 1914 SAFL Grand Final =

Port Adelaide	North Adelaide
13.15 (93)	1.8 (14)
	1	2	3	4
PTA	2.1 (13)	5.7 (37)	7.8 (50)	13.15 (93)
NTH	0.3 (3)	0.4 (4)	0.8 (8)	1.8 (14)
- Date: Saturday, 19 September
- Stadium: Adelaide Oval
- Attendance: 11,000
- Umpires: O'Connor

Accolades
- Best on Ground: Stanley Seccombe (Adelaide Journal)

The 1914 SAFL Grand Final was an Australian rules football competition. Port Adelaide beat North Adelaide by a margin of 79 points (93 to 14).

== Teams ==
Teams were announced the morning of the match.

Port Adelaide
B:	William Boon	Horace Pope	Alex McFarlane
HB:	Jack Londrigan (c)	John W. Robertson	Henry Eaton
C:	Joseph Middleton	Harold Oliver (vc)	Sampson Hosking
HF:	Joseph Watson	Frank Magor	Albert Chaplin
F:	Charles Anderson	John Dunn	Angelo Congear
Foll:	Alan Maynard	John Ashley	William Drummond
Coach:	Jack Londrigan		

North Adelaide
B:	David Cole	Glyn Trescowthick	Tymons
HB:	Guy Pratten	Percy Lewis	Stanley Secombe
C:	Leslie Thomas	Charles Fullarton	Alby Klose (vc)
HF:	Albert Murch	Albert Sandrey	James Wainwright
F:	Stanley Williams	Ernie Johns (c)	Dan O'Brien
Foll:	Charles Tuckey	Michael Cronin	Arthur Russell
Coach:	Ernie Johns		

== Scorecard ==
Grand Final
Saturday, 19 September	Port Adelaide	def.	North Adelaide	Adelaide Oval (crowd: 11,000)	Report
2.1 (13); 5.7 (37); 7.8 (50); 13.15 (93)	Q1; Q2; Q3; Final	0.3 (3); 0.4 (4); 0.8 (8); 1.8 (14)
Congear 4 Chaplin 3 Drummond, Andersen 2 Dunn, McFarlane 1	Goals	1 Thomas
Congear, Chaplin, Watson, Magor, Drummond, Andersen, Londrigan, Boon, Pope, Oliver, Robertson	Best	Secombe, Klose, Lewis, O'Brien, Pratten, Thomas, Wainwright, Russell, Trescowthick, Murch
