= 1915 VFL grand final =

Grand final of the 1915 Victorian Football League season

1915 VFL Grand Final
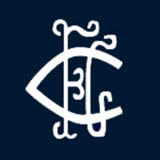

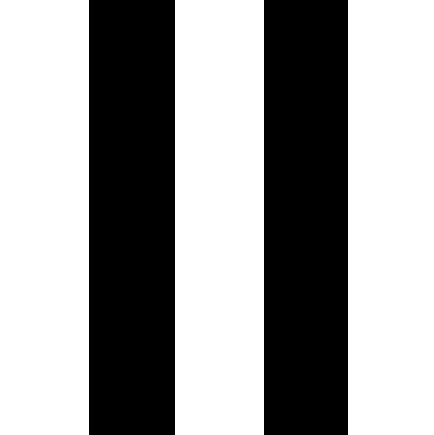
Carlton	Collingwood
11.12 (78)	6.9 (45)
	1	2	3	4
CAR	2.5 (17)	6.6 (42)	6.8 (44)	11.12 (78)
COLL	3.0 (18)	4.2 (26)	5.9 (39)	6.9 (45)
- Date: 18 September 1915
- Stadium: Melbourne Cricket Ground
- Attendance: 39,343

The 1915 VFL Grand Final was an Australian rules football game contested between the Collingwood Football Club and Carlton Football Club, held at the Melbourne Cricket Ground in Melbourne on 18 September 1915. It was the 18th annual Grand Final of the Victorian Football League, staged to determine the premiers for the 1915 VFL season. The match, attended by 39,343 spectators, was won by Carlton by a margin of 33 points, marking that club's fifth premiership victory and second in succession.

== Teams ==
Carlton	Collingwood

Carlton
B:	Paddy O'Brien	Ernie Jamieson	Andy McDonald
HB:	Alf Baud (c)	Billy Robinson	Ted Brown
C:	Jimmy Morris	Rod McGregor	George Challis
HF:	Herb Burleigh	Percy Daykin	Charlie Fisher
F:	Gordon Green	Vin Gardiner	Athol Sharp
Foll:	Charlie Hammond	Harry Haughton	Viv Valentine
Coach:	Norm Clark		

Collingwood
B:	Alec Mutch	Ted Rowell	Sam Mortimer
HB:	Jack Green	Dan Minogue (c)	George Anderson
C:	Tom Clancy	Jock McHale	Jim Sadler
HF:	Paddy Rowan	Mal Seddon	Charlie Laxton
F:	Harry Curtis	Dick Lee	Gus Dobrigh
Foll:	Les Hughes	Pen Reynolds	Percy Wilson
Coach:	Jock McHale		

- Umpire – Norden

== Statistics ==
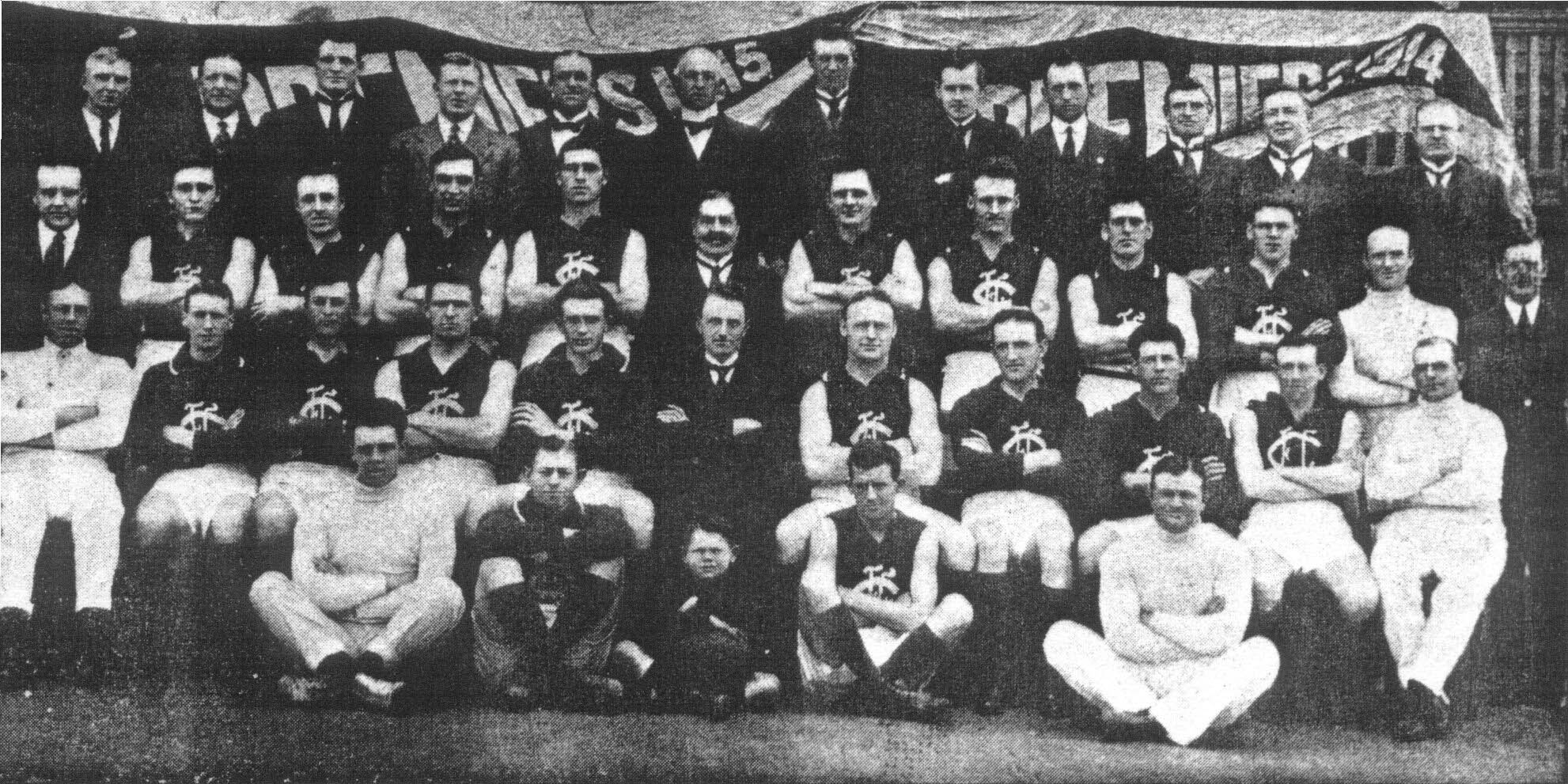
Carlton FC, Premiers

=== Goalkickers ===
Carlton:

- H Burleigh 4
- V Gardiner 3
- C Hammond 2
- P Daykin 1
- G Green 1

Collingwood:

- D Lee 3
- G Dobrigh 1
- L Hughes 1
- M Seddon 1

== See also ==
- 1915 VFL season
