= 1914 Sydney Carnival =

Third annual Australian Rules football national competition

Tournament information
- Sport: Australian football
- Location: Sydney, Australia
- Dates: 5 August 1914–15 August 1914
- Administrator: Australian National Football Council
- Format: Round-robin
- Teams: 6

Final champion
- Victoria

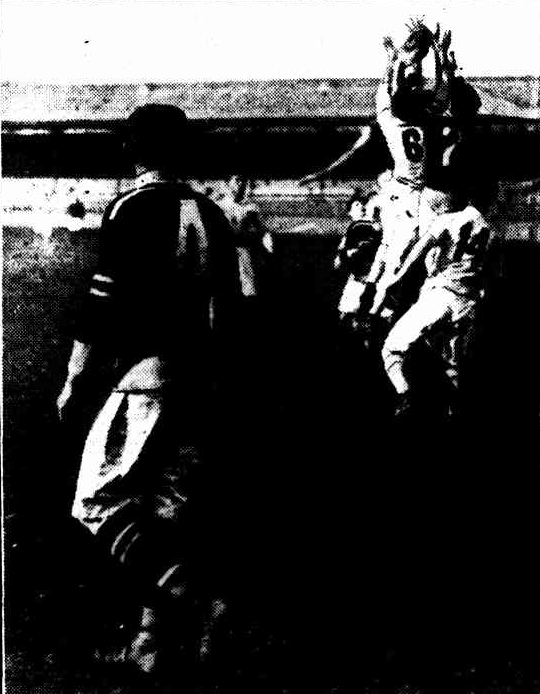
New South Wales vs South Australia at the SCG

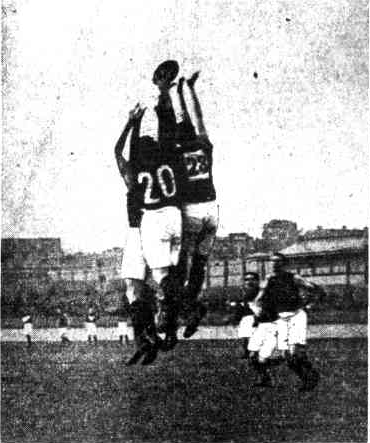
Victoria vs Western Australia at the SCG

The 1914 Sydney Carnival was the third edition of the Australian National Football Carnival, an Australian football interstate competition. It was held between Wednesday 5 August and Saturday 15 August 1914. As in previous competitions, players could represent the state that they were playing in at the time. Victoria was the winning state, going undefeated through the competition.

The carnival, which was the first to take place in New South Wales, was contested by teams from each of the six states: Victoria, South Australia, Western Australia, Tasmania, New South Wales and Queensland. Interest in the event was overshadowed by the declarations of war by Britain on Germany on 4 August, and the opening manoeuvres of World War I which followed. Ultimately, the event made a loss, drawing at the gate enough to cover approximately half of its operating expenses.

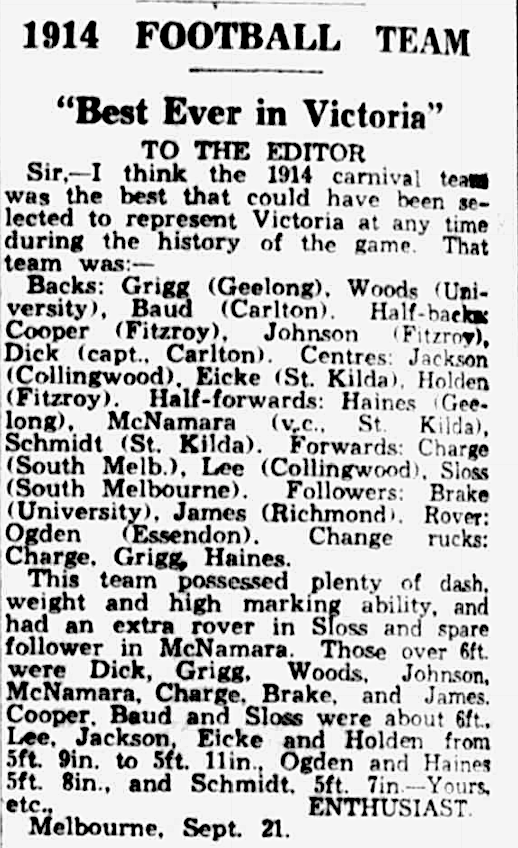
Enthusiast's Letter to the Editor The Herald, 21 September 1934.

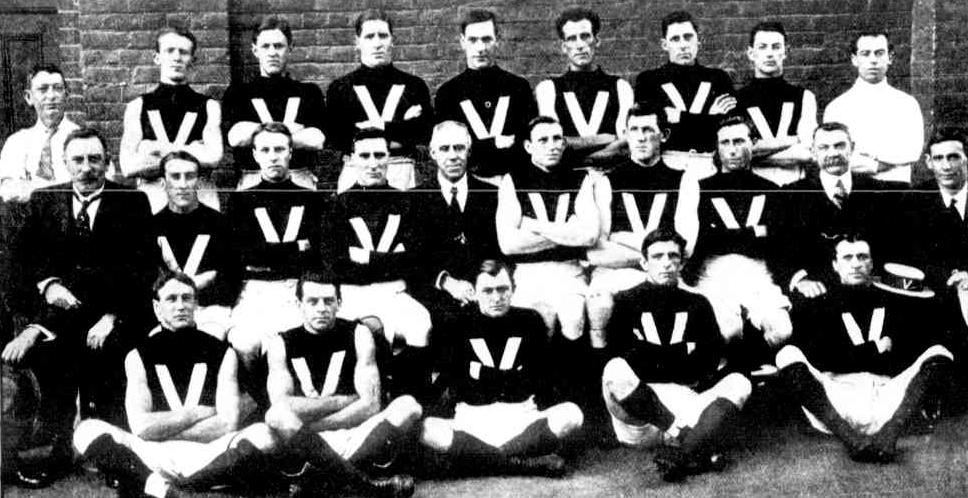
Victorian team winners of the Sydney Carnival

== Teams ==
Six teams competed at the Carnival.

=== New South Wales ===
Walter Abotomey, Desmond Baird, Francis Ernest "Frank" Beaver, Reginald Horace Blackburn, John "Con" Cannon, Leslie Glen Clarke, Walter Davis, Albert Herbert "Bert" Ellis, Albert V. Erickson, John "Jack" Fisher, Walter Harris, Eric Emerson Hughes, Allan Raymond "Sacko" Jackson, William Henry Kumnick, Vincent "Bing" McCann, Harry A. McCullagh, Frederick Roy "Freddy Mack" McGargill, Francis Leo "Frank" McDonald, Edward Alexander McFadden, Michael "Mick" McInerney, Frederick Arthur "Sailor" Meadows, James Howarth "Jim" Munro, Cornelius J. Murphy, Brutus E. "Bruce" O'Grady, George Parr, S.V. Peace, Andrew Thomas P. "Andy" Ratcliffe, Ralph "Robby" Robertson, Robert Sands, E. Stevens, R.W. Stevenson, Gerald Stewart, William "Billy" Thomas, E. Tyson, Albert Henry Vincent, William "Jack" Webb. Coach, Dick Condon; manager and assistant coach, Bill Strickland.

=== Queensland ===
D. Arnall, G. Beech, E. Bliss, E. Crouch, W. H. Cooke, A. J. Cowley, D. Duffy, W. East, A. Grieves, J. H. Hawke, P. W. Jones, C. Lawrence, S. McKinley, A. McPherson, A. C. McCaul, J. Minus, W. Maroney, D. Ogilvy, A. C. Roberts, A. E. Skuce, P. R. Willshire, G. Wilson, L. Wilson.

=== South Australia ===
W. Mayman, F. H. Golding, D. V. McDougall (Sturt), W. H. Oliver; J. C. Watson, F. G. Magor, J. W. Robertson, A. McFarlane, J. Ashley, A. Congear (Port Adelaide). F. H. Keen, J. J. Tredrea, F. M. Barry (South Adelaide), S. Patten, D. Low (West Torrens). A. Klose, E. Johns, T. Leahy, L. Thomas (North Adelaide), W. H. Dowling, J. R. Hanley, H. R. Head (West Adelaide), Manager, Mr. J. Hodge.

=== Tasmania ===
E. Absolom, G. Aulsebrook (North Hobart), Roy Bailey (Lefroy) (captain), J. Barnett, W. Bastick, Lionel Bennison (Cananore), F. Burton, R. Coogan. R. Cooper, C. Dunn (vice-captain), J. Dunn, J. Flanagan, G. Goddard (Cananore), Cecil Hanigan (Cananore), W. Jack, Ivor Margetts (Lefroy), C. Morrison, J. Pennicott, J. "James" Pugh (City), E. Randall (Cananore), L. Russell, Alf Whitney (North Hobart).

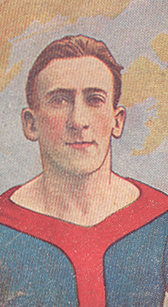
George Heinz, voted Victoria's best player

=== Victoria ===
Alf Baud, Billy Dick, Harry Haughton (Carlton), Jack Green, Jim Jackson, Dick Lee (Collingwood), Cyril Gove, Percy Ogden (Essendon), George Holden, Jack Cooper, Wally Johnson (Fitzroy), Dick Grigg, George Heinz, Harry Marsham (Geelong), Dave McNamara, Wels Eicke, Billy Schmidt (St Kilda), Charlie Lilley (Melbourne), Les Charge, Bruce Sloss (South Melbourne), Jack Brake, Eric Woods (University), Hugh James (Richmond).

=== West Australia ===
Smith, Hebbard, Robinson, Dan Scullion, Hurley, Daly, Sullivan, Slattery, Eddy (Goldfields), Burns, Limb, Sellars, Doig, Tapping, Youlden, Truscott, Thomas, McIntosh, Cain, Tomkins, Fisher, Oakley, Matson, Mose (Coastal League).

=== Umpires ===
Jack Elder from Victoria, Henry "Ivo" Crapp from West Australia, S.F. Carter from South Australia, and L.J. Pitcher (New South Wales).

== Results ==
	1914 Sydney Carnival
Wednesday, 5 August (12:45pm)	New South Wales 13.15 (93)	def.	Queensland 2.4 (16)	Sydney Cricket Ground
Wednesday, 5 August (3:00pm)	South Australia 12.16 (88)	def.	Western Australia 12.11 (83)	Sydney Cricket Ground
Thursday, 6 August (3:00pm)	Victoria 28.20 (188)	def.	Tasmania 8.9 (57)	Sydney Cricket Ground
Friday, 7 August (3:00pm)	South Australia 32.18 (210)	def.	Queensland 2.9 (21)	Sydney Cricket Ground
Saturday, 8 August (1:30pm)	New South Wales 15.14 (104)	def.	Tasmania 5.13 (43)	Sydney Cricket Ground (crowd: 8,000 C-R))
Saturday, 8 August (3:00pm)	Victoria 13.16 (94)	def.	Western Australia 11.14 (80)	Sydney Cricket Ground (crowd: 8,000)
Monday, 10 August (1:30pm)	Tasmania 15.17 (107)	def.	Queensland 4.5 (29)	Sydney Cricket Ground
Monday, 10 August (3:30pm)	South Australia 16.20 (106)	def.	New South Wales 10.3 (63)	Sydney Cricket Ground
Tuesday, 11 August (1:30pm)	Western Australia 33.31 (229)	def.	Queensland 6.5 (41)	Sydney Cricket Ground
Tuesday, 11 August (3:00pm)	Victoria 24.20 (164)	def.	New South Wales 4.7 (31)	Sydney Cricket Ground
Wednesday, 12 August (3:00pm)	South Australia 18.23 (131)	def.	Tasmania 5.7 (37)	Sydney Cricket Ground
Thursday, 13 August (1:30pm)	Western Australia 29.14 (188)	def.	Tasmania 12.8 (80)	Sydney Cricket Ground
Thursday, 13 August (3:00pm)	Victoria 28.22 (190)	def.	Queensland 4.3 (27)	Sydney Cricket Ground
Saturday, 15 August (12:40pm)	Western Australia 23.24 (162)	def.	New South Wales 8.10 (58)	Sydney Cricket Ground (crowd: 12,000 C-R))
Saturday, 15 August (3:00pm)	Victoria 11.11 (77)	def.	South Australia 5.10 (44)	Sydney Cricket Ground (crowd: 12,000)

=== Ladder ===
1914 Sydney Carnival ladder
Pos	Team	Pld	W	L	D	Pts
1	Victoria	5	5	0	0	20
2	South Australia	5	4	1	0	16
3	Western Australia	5	3	2	0	12
4	New South Wales	5	2	3	0	8
5	Tasmania	5	1	4	0	4
6	Queensland	5	0	5	0	0

=== Other awards and events ===
At the completion of the tournament, the best player from each state was awarded a gold medal, also known as Referee Medals, named after the Sydney newspaper. The winners were:

- George Heinz (Victoria)
- John W. Robertson (South Australia)
- Albert Tapping (Western Australia)
- Ralph Robertson (New South Wales)
- Jack Pennicott (Tasmania)
- P.W. Jones (Queensland).

Additional events held as part of the carnival included a series of junior and schoolboys' representative matches, played in timeslots not occupied by senior matches, as well as a goalkicking competition and a long-distance kicking competition, in both of which the best Australian rules football players in each discipline faced off against rugby league star Dally Messenger.

- In the goalkicking competition, Herbert Limb (Western Australia) won the preliminary round amongst the Australian rules footballers. Messenger then defeated Limb in the final.
- In the distance kicking competition, Dave McNamara (Victoria) won with a distance of 67yds 8in from a place kick (before later kicking 76 yards in an out-of-competition kick); Alex Robinson (Western Australia) was second with a distance of 65 yards.
