= 1914 Port Adelaide Football Club season =

Port Adelaide Football Club
1914 season
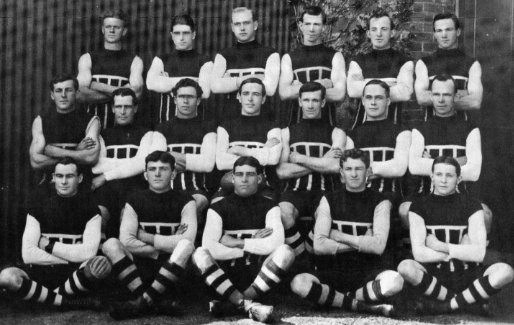
- President: Dr Alexander Benson
- Coach: Jack Londrigan
- Captain: Jack Londrigan
- Home ground: Alberton Oval
- Best and Fairest: Jack Ashley
- Highest home attendance: 8,500 (Round 6 vs. West Torrens)

The 1914 Port Adelaide Football Club season was the club's 37th year in the South Australian Football League.

== 1914 list changes ==
=== New recruits ===
New recruits
Player	Former Club
John Dunn	West Torrens
Leonard Wisdom	Port Adelaide B
Cuthbert Lincoln	Port Adelaide B

=== Retirements and delistings ===
Retirements and delistings
Player	Note
Francis Hansen	retired mid season
Albert Chaplin	
Joseph Middleton	
John Londrigan	retired at end of season
Joseph Watson	after season went to serve in World War I
Clifford Cock	

== 1914 squad ==
Due to World War I, many Port Adelaide players enlisted to take part in the conflict at season's end. Of the 1914 squad, Albert Chaplin, Joseph Watson and William Boon would be killed in action.

Port Adelaide Football Club
1914 Senior list		Coaching staff
3 Angelo Congear; Jack Londrigan (c); 9 Sampson Hosking; 14 Harold Oliver; Jack Ashley; John Dunn; Francis Hansen; Cuthbert Lincoln; Leonard Wisdom; Samuel Howie; William Drummond; Alan Maynard	Henry Eaton; Joseph Watson; Alex McFarlane; Francis Magor; Charles Andersen; Clifford Cock; Horace Pope; Joseph Middleton; Albert Chaplin; John Robertson; William Boon	Head coach: Jack Londrigan; Legend: (c) Captain(s); (vc) Vice-captain(s); Updated: 14 October 1914; Source(s): Playing list, Coaching staff

== 1914 pre-season ==
=== Game 1 ===
	Game 1
Saturday, 4 April	Port Adelaide 14.10 (94)	def.	Semaphore Central 5.3 (33)	Alberton Oval

=== Game 2 ===
	Game 2
Saturday, 11 April	Port Adelaide 17.10 (112)	def.	Port Adelaide B 3.2 (20)	Alberton Oval

=== Game 3 ===
	Game 2
Saturday, 18 April	Port Adelaide 11.19 (85)	def.	Semaphore/Port B 4.7 (27)	Alberton Oval

=== Game 4 ===
	Game 4
Saturday, 25 April	Port Adelaide 25.25 (175)	def.	West Torrens B 4.1 (25)	Alberton Oval

== 1914 home-and-away season ==
=== Round 1 ===
Round 1
Saturday, 2 May	South Adelaide	def. by	Port Adelaide	Adelaide Oval (crowd: 10,500)
1.1 (7); 2.5 (17); 4.6 (30); 7.8 (50)	Q1; Q2; Q3; Final	3.3 (21); 6.6 (42); 8.10 (56); 10.13 (73)	Umpires: S. Coleman
C. Tredrea, J. Tredrea, Waye, Windsor, Jones, Young, Foale 1	Goals	3 Dunn, Ashley; 2 Magor, Congear
Mahoney, Dugan, Mueller, Foale. C. Tredrea; McKee, Barry, Wallace, J. Tredrea	Best	Ashley, Oliver, Magor, Pope, Eaton; Londrigan, Middleton, Maynard, McFarlane
Record: 1 Win, 0 Losses, 0 Draws (146.00%); Ladder Position: 1st

=== Round 2 ===
Round 2
Bye; Port Adelaide

=== Round 3 ===
Round 3
Saturday, 16 May	Port Adelaide	def.	Sturt	Alberton Oval (crowd: 5,000)
3.5 (23); 7.10 (52); 8.14 (62); 14.16 (100)	Q1; Q2; Q3; Final	0.2 (2); 2.4 (16); 3.4 (22); 4.5 (29)	Umpires: Mr Hackey (replacing Mr Coleman)
Dunn 6 Magor 4 Congear 2 Chaplin, Watson 1	Goals	2 Offe; 1 Sellick, Bannigan
Drummond, Middleton, Ashley, Watson, Oliver; Dunn, Robertson, Magor	Best	Bannigan, Hewett, Kappler, Mayman, Sharpe; Smith, Mowatt, Nicolle, Baulderstone.
Record: 2 Win, 0 Losses, 0 Draws (218.99%); Ladder Position: 1st

=== Round 4 ===
Round 4
Saturday, 23 May	Port Adelaide	def.	West Torrens	Alberton Oval
2.3 (15); 6.5 (41); 8.9 (57); 13.11 (89)	Q1; Q2; Q3; Final	1.1 (7); 1.2 (8); 2.4 (16); 2.9 (21)
Anderson 3 Drummond, Ashley, Dunn 2 McFarlane, Chaplin, Congear, Watson 1	Goals	2 Gibbons
Watson, Congear, Robertson, Pope, Ashley; Oliver, Drummond	Best	Patten, Hutton, Waite, Richmond, Rimes; Scott, Miller
Record: 3 Win, 0 Losses, 0 Draws (262.00%); Ladder Position: 1st

=== Round 5 ===
Round 5
Saturday, 30 May	Norwood	def. by	Port Adelaide	Norwood Oval (crowd: 9,000)
1.2 (8); 2.5 (17); 5.5 (35); 8.5 (53)	Q1; Q2; Q3; Final	4.3 (27); 5.5 (35); 9.8 (62); 13.13 (91)
Chamberlain 3 Packham 1 Short, Trembath, Kearney 1	Goals	4 Ashley; 3 Congear; 2 Magor, Dunn; 1 Anderson, Druminond
Packham, Robin, Trembath, Short, Crawford, Chamberlain, Millhouse, Grantley, Kearney	Best	Oliver, Ashley, Robertson, Anderson, Maynard, McFarlane, Drummond, Pope.
Record: 4 Win, 0 Losses, 0 Draws (230.72%); Ladder Position: 1st

=== Round 6 (Queen's Birthday) ===
Round 6
Monday, 8 June	North Adelaide	def. by	Port Adelaide	Adelaide Oval (crowd: 15,000)
1.1 (7); 2.2 (14); 3.8 (26); 6.10 (46)	Q1; Q2; Q3; Final	4.4 (28); 6.4 (40); 9.4 (58); 11.8 (74)
Johns, LeMessurier, Lewis, Leahy, Wainwright, Jones 1	Goals	4 Dunn; 2 Magor, Congear, Chaplin; 1 Anderson, Watson
LeMessurier, Leahy, O'Brien, Johns, Pratten, Secombe, Sandrey, Thomas, Wainwright.	Best	Ashley, Maynard, McFarlane, Anderson, Watson, Magor, Oliver, Robertson, Lendgrigan, Hoskin.
Record: 5 Win, 0 Losses, 0 Draws (214.57%); Ladder Position: 1st

=== Round 7 ===
Round 7
Saturday, 13 June	Port Adelaide	def.	West Adelaide	Alberton Oval (crowd: 5,000)
3.5 (23); 6.12 (48); 10.16 (76); 14.21 (105)	Q1; Q2; Q3; Final	0.3 (3); 1.5 (11); 3.6 (24); 4.6 (30)
Dunn 4 McFarlane, Congear, Ashley 2 Magor, Chaplain, Anderson, Drummond 1	Goals	Hanley, Scott, Dowling, Keegan 1
Oliver, Ashley, Hoskin, Congear, Drummond, Robertson, Lendgrigan, Pope, Watson, Magor	Best	A'Court, Dwyer, Hanley, Mills, Pierce, Stearnes, Keegan
Record: 6 Win, 0 Losses, 0 Draws (232.31%); Ladder Position: 1st

=== Round 8 ===
Round 8
Saturday, 20 June	Port Adelaide	def.	South Adelaide	Alberton Oval (crowd: 5,000 to 6,000)
2.5 (17); 3.10 (28); 6.10 (46); 9.15 (69)	Q1; Q2; Q3; Final	0.1 (1); 4.4 (28); 5.5 (35); 5.7 (37)
Watson 3 Chaplain, Congear 2 Magor, Anderson 1	Goals	Job 2 Tredrea, Waye, Barry 1
Congear, McFarlane, Oliver, Watson, Pope	Best	Tredrea, Waye, Dugan, McKee, Muller, Barry
Record: 7 Win, 0 Losses, 0 Draws (225.94%); Ladder Position: 1st

=== Round 9 ===
Round 9
Saturday, 27 June	Port Adelaide	def.	West Torrens	Adelaide Oval (crowd: 8,500)
4.0 (24); 5.7 (37); 6.11 (47); 11.15 (81)	Q1; Q2; Q3; Final	3.1 (19); 3.1 (19); 5.2 (32); 9.5 (59)
Hansen 4 Chaplain, Congear, Anderson 2 Drummond 1	Goals	A. A. Miller 3 Johnson, Conole 2 Woite, Rimes 1
Robertson, Ashley, Oliver, Hosking, Anderson, Drummond, Watson, Maynard, Congear, Lowe	Best	Fooks, Conole, Johnson, Hutton, Patten, Geddes, A. A. Miller, Richmond, Woite
Record: 8 Win, 0 Losses, 0 Draws (209.85%); Ladder Position: 1st

=== Round 10 ===
Round 10
Bye; Port Adelaide

=== Round 11 ===
Round 11
Saturday, 11 July	Sturt	def. by	Port Adelaide	Unley Oval (crowd: 7,000)
2.0 (12); 6.3 (39); 6.5 (41); 6.5 (41)	Q1; Q2; Q3; Final	3.4 (22); 3.5 (23); 10.7 (67); 13.10 (88)
Sellick, Robinson 2 Neate, Golding 1	Goals	3 Dunn, Chaplain; 2 Robertson, Congear, Ashley; 1 Watson
McDougall, Robinson, Edwards, Baulderstone, Hewitt, Kappler	Best	Oliver, Ashley, Watson, Robertson, Congear
Record: 9 Win, 0 Losses, 0 Draws (210.38%); Ladder Position: 1st

=== Round 12 ===
Round 12
Saturday, 18 July	Port Adelaide	def.	Norwood	Alberton Oval (crowd: 5,000)
4.1 (25); 11.3 (69); 15.7 (97); 19.17 (131)	Q1; Q2; Q3; Final	2.2 (14); 2.5 (17); 5.6 (36); 7.8 (50)
Congear 7 Chaplain, Dunn, Ashley, Magor, Anderson 2 Watson, Drummond 1	Goals	Stephens 4 P. Miller 2 Packham 1
Ashley, Congear, Oliver, Watson, Robertson, McFarlane	Best	Stephens, E. F. Beams, Crawford, Grantley, Nash, White
Record: 10 Win, 0 Losses, 0 Draws (216.59%); Ladder Position: 1st

=== Round 13 ===
Round 13
Saturday, 22 August	North Adelaide	def. by	Port Adelaide	Adelaide Oval (crowd: 9,000)
3.1 (19); 3.4 (22); 5.7 (37); 8.11 (59)	Q1; Q2; Q3; Final	3.2 (20); 7.6 (48); 9.11 (65); 11.14 (80)
Williams 3 Sandery, Johns 2 O'Brien 1	Goals	2 Dunn, Chaplain, Ashley; 1 Drummond, Congear, Watson, Oliver, Magor
Leahy, Klose, O'Brien, Lewis, Threadgold, Trescowthick, Williams	Best	Robertson, Drummond, Oliver, Lincoln, Chaplain, Watson, Ashley
Record: 11 Win, 0 Losses, 0 Draws (206.53%); Ladder Position: 1st

=== Round 14 ===
Round 14
Saturday, 29 August	West Adelaide	def. by	Port Adelaide	Adelaide Oval (crowd: 6,500)
0.0 (0); 3.2 (20); 4.4 (28); 5.5 (35)	Q1; Q2; Q3; Final	5.5 (35); 5.6 (36); 10.12 (72); 12.15 (87)
Hanley 2 Hele, Dwyer, Fitzgerald 1	Goals	3 Watson; 2 Dunn, Ashley; 1 Chaplain, Congear, Magor, Pope, Anderson
a'Court, Baker, Dowling, Hanley, Head, Stearnes, Walsh	Best	Drummond, Chaplain, Hosking, Watson, Oliver, Ashley, Robertson
Record: 12 Win, 0 Losses, 0 Draws (209.41%); Ladder Position: 1st

== Ladder ==
1914 SAFL Ladder
Pos	Team	Pld	W	L	D	PF	PA	PP	Pts
1	Port Adelaide (P)	12	12	0	0	1068	510	67.68	24
2	North Adelaide	12	6	6	0	723	769	48.46	12
3	Sturt	12	6	6	0	665	799	45.42	12
4	West Torrens	12	5	6	1	715	786	47.63	11
5	West Adelaide	12	4	7	1	621	767	44.74	9
6	South Adelaide	12	4	8	0	692	722	48.94	8
7	Norwood	12	4	8	0	656	787	45.46	8

Rules for classification: 1) points; 2) percentage; 3) number of points for.
(P) Premiers

== Finals ==
=== Semi-final ===
1914 SAFL Semi-final
Saturday, 5 September	Port Adelaide	def.	Sturt	Adelaide Oval (crowd: 8,000)	Report
3.7 (25); 3.11 (29); 6.13 (49); 12.17 (89)	Q1; Q2; Q3; Final	0.0 (0); 4.3 (27); 5.3 (33); 5.5 (35)	Umpires: O'Connor
Dunn 4 Chaplin, Drummond 2 Ashley, Magor, Watson, Congear 1	Goals	2 Smith; 1 Golding, Sellick, Neate

=== Grand Final ===
1914 SAFL Grand Final
Saturday, 19 September	Port Adelaide	def.	North Adelaide	Adelaide Oval (crowd: 11,200)	Report
2.1 (13); 5.7 (37); 7.8 (50); 13.15 (93)	Q1; Q2; Q3; Final	0.3 (3); 0.4 (4); 0.8 (8); 1.8 (14)
Congear 4 Chaplin 3 Drummond, Andersen 2 Dunn, McFarlane 1	Goals	1 Thomas
Congear, Chaplin, Watson, Magor, Drummond, Andersen, Londrigan, Boon, Pope, Oliver, Robertson	Best	Secombe, Klose, Lewis, O'Brien, Pratten, Thomas, Wainwright, Russell, Trescowthick, Murch

== Postseason ==
=== Championship of Australia ===
1914 Championship of Australia
Saturday, 3 October	Port Adelaide	def.	Carlton	Adelaide Oval (crowd: 5,000)
2.4 (16); 5.6 (36); 6.9 (45); 9.16 (70)	Q1; Q2; Q3; Final	1.3 (9); 3.3 (21); 4.4 (28); 5.6 (36)	Umpires: O'Connor
Congear 4 Watson 2 Chaplin, Drummond, Wisdom 1	Goals	McKenzie 2 Baud, Morris, Sharp 1

=== Port Adelaide Patriotic Fund Match ===
Port Adelaide vs. Semaphore Central (SA Amateur Premiers)
Saturday, 10 October	Port Adelaide	def.	Semaphore Central	Alberton Oval	Report
1.2 (8); 4.12 (36); 6.12 (48); 9.17 (71)	Q1; Q2; Q3; Final	5.1 (31); 5.1 (31); 8.3 (51); 8.4 (52)	Umpires: Curtain

=== Port Adelaide vs. South Australia ===
Port Adelaide vs. South Australia
Wednesday, 14 October	Port Adelaide	def.	South Australia	Jubilee Oval
1.2 (8); 6.7 (43); 8.9 (57); 14.14 (98)	Q1; Q2; Q3; Final	2.3 (15); 2.7 (19); 5.10 (40); 5.10 (40)
Chaplin 4 Watson 3 Drummond, Congear, Wisdom, McFarlane, Andersen, Ashley, Oliver 1	Goals	2 Packham; 1 Barry, Stephens, Fitzgerald
A medal for best on ground was awarded to Harold Oliver of Port Adelaide.
