= 1914 SAFL season =

1914 SAFL premiership season
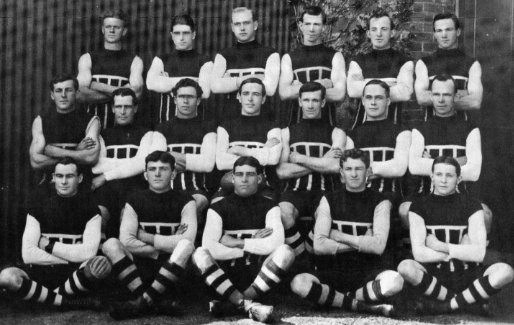
- 37th SAFL season. The 1914 Port Adelaide premiership team.
- Teams: 7
- Premiers: Port Adelaide; 8th premiership
- Minor premiers: Port Adelaide; 11th minor premiership
- Magarey Medallist: Jack Ashley; Port Adelaide
- Leading goalkicker: Jack Dunn; Port Adelaide (33 goals)
- Matches played: 45
- Highest: 15,000 (Round 6, Port Adelaide vs. North Adelaide)

The 1914 South Australian Football League season was the 38th season of the top-level Australian rules football competition in South Australia.

The season opened on 2 May, and concluded on 19 September with the grand final, in which minor premiers Port Adelaide won its eighth premiership, defeating North Adelaide by 79 points. West Torrens and Sturt also made the top four teams and participated in the finals series. West Adelaide, South Adelaide and Norwood all missed the top four.

Port Adelaide was undefeated throughout the 1914 season, the only team in the league's history ever to achieve the feat. In addition, Port Adelaide beat a composite team of all the other SAFL sides and Carlton in the Champions of Australia match played at Adelaide Oval.

== 1914 SAFL minor rounds ==
=== Round 1 ===
| | Round 1 |
| Saturday, 2 May | South Adelaide 7.8 (50) | def. by | Port Adelaide 10.13 (73) | Adelaide Oval (crowd: 10,500) |
| Saturday, 2 May | Norwood 8.14 (62) | def. | West Adelaide 6.7 (43) | Norwood Oval (crowd: 5,000) |
| Saturday, 2 May | Sturt 9.4 (58) | def. | North Adelaide 6.8 (44) | Unley Oval |
| | Bye; West Torrens |

=== Round 2 ===
| | Round 2 |
| Saturday, 9 May | North Adelaide 9.9 (63) | def. | West Adelaide 8.9 (57) | Adelaide Oval (crowd: 7,300) |
| Monday, 11 May | Norwood 11.12 (78) | def. | West Torrens 4.9 (33) | Adelaide Oval (crowd: 12,000) |
| Monday, 11 May | Sturt 8.11 (59) | def. | South Adelaide 8.9 (57) | Unley Oval |
| | Bye; Port Adelaide |

=== Round 3 ===
| | Round 3 |
| Saturday, 16 May | North Adelaide 11.15 (81) | def. | South Adelaide 8.6 (54) | Adelaide Oval |
| Saturday, 16 May | West Torrens 9.8 (62) | drew with | West Adelaide 8.14 (62) | Hindmarsh Oval (crowd: 5,000) |
| Saturday, 16 May | Port Adelaide 14.16 (100) | def. | Sturt 4.5 (29) | Alberton Oval (crowd: 5,000) |
| | Bye; Norwood |

=== Round 4 ===
| | Round 4 |
| Saturday, 23 May | South Adelaide 4.7 (31) | def. by | West Adelaide 4.10 (34) | Adelaide Oval |
| Saturday, 23 May | Port Adelaide 13.11 (89) | def. | West Torrens 2.9 (21) | Alberton Oval |
| Saturday, 23 May | Norwood 5.7 (37) | def. by | Sturt 5.15 (45) | Norwood Oval (crowd: 7,000) |
| | Bye; North Adelaide |

=== Round 5 ===
| | Round 5 |
| Saturday, 30 May | North Adelaide 8.12 (60) | def. | West Torrens 8.8 (56) | Adelaide Oval (crowd: 4,200) |
| Saturday, 30 May | Norwood 8.5 (53) | def. by | Port Adelaide 13.13 (91) | Norwood Oval (crowd: 9,000) |
| Saturday, 30 May | Sturt 7.7 (49) | def. by | West Adelaide 8.11 (59) | Unley Oval |
| | Bye; South Adelaide |

=== Round 6 ===
| | Round 6 |
| Saturday, 6 June | South Adelaide 7.15 (57) | def. | Norwood 5.11 (41) | Adelaide Oval (crowd: 7,000) |
| Saturday, 6 June | West Torrens 11.11 (77) | def. by | Sturt 13.5 (83) | Hindmarsh Oval |
| Monday, 8 June | North Adelaide 6.19 (46) | def. by | Port Adelaide 11.8 (74) | Adelaide Oval (crowd: 15,000) |
| | Bye; West Adelaide |

=== Round 7 ===
| | Round 7 |
| Saturday, 13 June | North Adelaide 7.17 (59) | def. | Norwood 8.9 (57) | Adelaide Oval |
| Saturday, 13 June | Port Adelaide 14.21 (105) | def. | West Adelaide 4.6 (30) | Alberton Oval (crowd: 5,000) |
| Saturday, 13 June | South Adelaide 10.8 (68) | def. | West Torrens 7.11 (53) | Jubilee Oval |
| | Bye; Sturt |

=== Round 8 ===
| | Round 8 |
| Saturday, 20 June | North Adelaide 9.10 (64) | def. by | Sturt 10.11 (71) | Adelaide Oval (crowd: 6,500) |
| Saturday, 20 June | Port Adelaide 9.15 (69) | def. | South Adelaide 5.7 (37) | Alberton Oval (crowd: 5,500) |
| Saturday, 20 June | West Adelaide 8.19 (67) | def. | Norwood 8.9 (57) | Jubilee Oval (crowd: 3,000) |
| | Bye; West Torrens |

=== Round 9 ===
| | Round 9 |
| Saturday, 27 June | Port Adelaide 11.15 (81) | def. | West Torrens 9.5 (59) | Adelaide Oval (crowd: 8,500) |
| Monday, 29 June | South Adelaide 11.10 (76) | def. | West Adelaide 5.7 (37) | Adelaide Oval (crowd: 10,200) |
| Monday, 29 June | Sturt 10.9 (69) | def. | Norwood 6.3 (39) | Unley Oval (crowd: 6,000) |
| | Bye; North Adelaide |

=== Round 10 ===
| | Round 10 |
| Saturday, 4 July | North Adelaide 8.16 (64) | def. | West Adelaide 8.7 (55) | Adelaide Oval |
| Saturday, 4 July | West Torrens 13.9 (87) | def. | Norwood 9.12 (66) | Hindmarsh Oval (crowd: 5,000) |
| Saturday, 4 July | South Adelaide 11.6 (72) | def. | Sturt 10.11 (71) | Jubilee Oval (crowd: 6,500) |
| | Bye; Port Adelaide |

=== Round 11 ===
| | Round 11 |
| Saturday, 11 July | North Adelaide 12.9 (81) | def. | South Adelaide 12.8 (80) | Jubilee Oval (crowd: 4,000) |
| Saturday, 11 July | Sturt 6.5 (41) | def. by | Port Adelaide 13.10 (88) | Unley Oval |
| Tuesday, 14 July | West Adelaide 6.15 (51) | def. by | West Torrens 9.8 (62) | Adelaide Oval (crowd: 6,000) |
| | Bye; Norwood |

=== Round 12 ===
| | Round 12 |
| Saturday, 18 July | Port Adelaide 19.17 (131) | def. | Norwood 7.8 (50) | Alberton Oval (crowd: 4,500) |
| Saturday, 18 July | West Torrens 8.21 (69) | def. | North Adelaide 6.15 (51) | Hindmarsh Oval (crowd: 5,000) |
| Saturday, 18 July | West Adelaide 13.13 (91) | def. | Sturt 5.19 (49) | Jubilee Oval |
| | Bye; South Adelaide |
Port Adelaide's score of 19.17 (131) was the highest any club had kicked in a match since Port Adelaide's record 29.12 (186) in round 14, 1903.

=== Round 13 ===
| | Round 13 |
| Saturday, 22 August | North Adelaide 8.11 (59) | def. by | Port Adelaide 11.14 (80) | Adelaide Oval (crowd: 9,000) |
| Saturday, 22 August | Norwood 8.10 (58) | def. | South Adelaide 8.6 (54) | Norwood Oval |
| Saturday, 22 August | Sturt 5.11 (41) | def. by | West Torrens 10.11 (71) | Unley Oval |
| | Bye; West Adelaide |

=== Round 14 ===
| | Round 14 |
| Saturday, 29 August | West Adelaide 5.5 (35) | def. by | Port Adelaide 12.15 (87) | Adelaide Oval |
| Saturday, 29 August | West Torrens 10.5 (65) | def. | South Adelaide 7.14 (56) | Hindmarsh Oval |
| Saturday, 29 August | Norwood 8.10 (58) | def. | North Adelaide 7.9 (51) | Norwood Oval (crowd: 2,000) |
| | Bye; Sturt |

== Ladder ==
1914 SAFL ladder
| Pos | Team | Pld | W | L | D | PF | PA | PP | Pts |
|---|---|---|---|---|---|---|---|---|---|
| 1 | Port Adelaide (P) | 12 | 12 | 0 | 0 | 1068 | 510 | 67.68 | 24 |
| 2 | North Adelaide | 12 | 6 | 6 | 0 | 723 | 769 | 48.46 | 12 |
| 3 | Sturt | 12 | 6 | 6 | 0 | 665 | 799 | 45.42 | 12 |
| 4 | West Torrens | 12 | 5 | 6 | 1 | 715 | 786 | 47.63 | 11 |
| 5 | West Adelaide | 12 | 4 | 7 | 1 | 621 | 767 | 44.74 | 9 |
| 6 | South Adelaide | 12 | 4 | 8 | 0 | 692 | 722 | 48.94 | 8 |
| 7 | Norwood | 12 | 4 | 8 | 0 | 656 | 787 | 45.46 | 8 |

Rules for classification: 1) points; 2) percentage; 3) number of points for
(P) Premiers

=== Win/loss table ===
| + | Win | Qualified for finals |
| − | Loss | Eliminated |

Bold – Home game
X – Bye
Opponent for round listed above margin

| Team | 1 | 2 | 3 | 4 | 5 | 6 | 7 | 8 | 9 | 10 | 11 | 12 | 13 | 14 | F1 | F2 | GF |
|---|---|---|---|---|---|---|---|---|---|---|---|---|---|---|---|---|---|
| Port Adelaide | SthA; 23 | X | Stu; 71 | **WT**; **68** | Nor; 38 | NthA; 28 | **WstA**; **75** | **SthA**; **32** | **WT**; **22** | X | Stu; 47 | **Nor**; **81** | NthA; 21 | WstA; 52 | **Stu**; **54** | X | **NthA**; **79** |
| North Adelaide | Stu; 14 | **WstA**; **6** | **SthA**; **27** | X | **WT**; **4** | **Port**; **28** | **Nor**; **2** | **Stu**; **7** | X | **WstA**; **9** | **SthA**; **1** | WT; 18 | **Port**; **21** | Nor; 7 | X | **WT**; **9** | Port; 79 |
| Sturt | **NthA**; **14** | **SthA**; **2** | Port; 71 | Nor; 8 | **WstA**; **10** | WT; 6 | X | NthA; 7 | **Nor**; **30** | SthA; 1 | **Port**; **47** | WstA; 42 | **WT**; **30** | X | **Port**; **54** | | |
| West Torrens | X | Nor; 45 | **WstA**; **0** | Port; 68 | NthA; 4 | **Stu**; **6** | SthA; 15 | X | Port; 22 | **Nor**; **21** | WstA; 11 | **NthA**; **18** | Stu; 30 | **SthA**; **9** | X | NthA; 9 | |
| West Adelaide | Nor; 19 | NthA; 6 | WT; 0 | SthA; 3 | Stu; 10 | X | Port; 75 | **Nor**; **10** | SthA; 39 | NthA; 9 | **WT**; **11** | **Stu**; **42** | X | **Port**; **52** | | | |
| South Adelaide | **Port**; **23** | Stu; 2 | NthA; 27 | **WstA**; **3** | X | **Nor**; **16** | WT; 15 | Port; 32 | **WstA**; **39** | Stu; 1 | NthA; 1 | X | Nor; 4 | WT; 9 | | | |
| Norwood | **WstA**; **19** | **WT**; **45** | X | **Stu**; **8** | **Port**; **38** | SthA; 16 | NthA; 2 | WstA; 10 | Stu; 30 | WT; 21 | X | Port; 81 | **SthA**; **4** | **NthA**; **7** | | | |
| Team | 1 | 2 | 3 | 4 | 5 | 6 | 7 | 8 | 9 | 10 | 11 | 12 | 13 | 14 | F1 | F2 | GF |

== 1914 SAFL Finals ==
=== Week 1 ===
| | Semi Final |
| Saturday, 5 September | Port Adelaide 12.17 (89) | def. | Sturt 5.5 (35) | Adelaide Oval (crowd: 8,000) |

=== Week 2 ===
| | Qualifying Finals |
| Saturday, 12 September | North Adelaide 5.10 (40) | def. | West Torrens 3.13 (31) | Adelaide Oval (crowd: 8,000) |

=== Week 3 (1914 SAFL Grand Final) ===
Grand Final
Saturday, 19 September | Port Adelaide | def. | North Adelaide | Adelaide Oval (crowd: 11,000) | Report
2.1 (13); 5.7 (37); 7.8 (50); 13.15 (93) | Q1; Q2; Q3; Final | 0.3 (3); 0.4 (4); 0.8 (8); 1.8 (14)
Congear 4 Chaplin 3 Drummond, Andersen 2 Dunn, McFarlane 1 | Goals | 1 Thomas
Congear, Chaplin, Watson, Magor, Drummond, Andersen, Londrigan, Boon, Pope, Oliver, Robertson | Best | Secombe, Klose, Lewis, O'Brien, Pratten, Thomas, Wainwright, Russell, Trescowthick, Murch

== Awards ==
- The Magarey Medal was awarded to Jack Ashley of Port Adelaide, who received the most votes.
- The leading goal kicker was Jack Dunn of Port Adelaide, who kicked 33 goals during the home and away season.
- The wooden spoon was awarded to Norwood for the second time.

=== Best and fairest ===
| Club | Player |
|---|---|
| North Adelaide | Tom Leahy |
| Norwood | Sidney White |
| Port Adelaide | Jack Ashley |
| South Adelaide | —N/a |
| Sturt | William Mayman |
| West Adelaide | —N/a |
| West Torrens | Stan Patten |

== Club leadership ==
| Club | Coach | Captain(s) |
|---|---|---|
| North Adelaide | —N/a | Johns, EEB |
| Norwood | Algy Millhouse | Algy Millhouse |
| Port Adelaide | Jack Londrigan | Jack Londrigan |
| South Adelaide | Jack Tredrea | Bert Renfry |
| Sturt | William Mayman | William Mayman |
| West Adelaide | —N/a | Joseph Dailey |
| West Torrens | Stewart Geddes | William Hutton |

== Post-season ==
=== 1914 Championship of Australia ===
| | 1914 Championship of Australia |
| Wednesday, 3 October | Port Adelaide 9.16 (70) | def. | Carlton 5.6 (36) | Adelaide Oval |

=== 1914 SAFL Combined State Game ===
| | South Australia vs. Port Adelaide |
| Wednesday, 14 October | South Australia 5.10 (40) | def. by | Port Adelaide 14.14 (98) | Jubilee Oval |
