= Ernie Johns =

Australian rules footballer

Personal information
- Full name: Ernest Edwin Burgess Johns
- Born: 22 August 1884
- Died: 25 September 1956 (aged 72)

Playing career^{1}
Years	Club	Games (Goals)
1902-1914	North Adelaide	162 (216)
Total		162 (216)

Representative team honours
Years	Team	Games (Goals)
1907-1914	South Australia	20 (62)
- ^{1} Playing statistics correct to the end of 1914.

Career highlights
- 2x North Adelaide premiership player 1902, 1905; North Adelaide Best and Fairest 1905; North Adelaide Captain 1914; 3x North Adelaide leading goalkicker 1911, 1913-1914; Played eight seasons without missing a match (NAFC record); North Adelaide Life Member 1919; North Adelaide Hall of Fame inaugural inductee 2015

Ernie Johns was an Australian rules footballer who played for North Adelaide Football Club in the South Australian Football Association/League (SAFA/SAFL). A leading forward in the period leading up to the First World War, Johns led the goal-kicking for North Adelaide for three seasons, played in two premierships and captained the club to a Grand Final loss in 1914. Johns hold a long-standing record for North Adelaide of playing eight consecutive seasons without missing a match. Johns excelled in representative matches for South Australia, playing 22 matches and kicking 62 goals, including appearances at the 1908 Melbourne, 1911 Adelaide and 1914 Sydney Carnivals. In 2015, Johns was an inductee into the newly established North Adelaide Football Club Hall of Fame.
