= Eric Wood (disambiguation) =

Eric Wood (born 1986) is a former American football center.

Eric Wood may also refer to:

- Eric Fisher Wood (1888–1962), American engineer and co-founder of the American Legion
- Eric Wood (footballer) (1920–2000), English footballer
- Eric Franklin Wood (1947–2021), Canadian-American hydrologist
- Eric Wood (baseball) (born 1992), Canadian baseball player

== See also ==
- Eric McWoods (born 1995), American soccer player
- Eric Woods (1892–1936), Australian rules footballer
