= Alby Matheson =

Australian rules footballer

Personal information
- Full name: Albert Donald Matheson
- Born: 19 March 1885; Laen, Victoria
- Died: 27 October 1934 (aged 49); Prahran, Victoria

Playing career^{1}
Years	Club	Games (Goals)
1905	Essendon	1 (0)
- ^{1} Playing statistics correct to the end of 1905.

Albert Donald Matheson (19 March 1885 – 27 October 1934) was an Australian rules footballer who played for the Essendon Football Club in the Victorian Football League (VFL).

== See also ==
- 1911 Adelaide Carnival
