= A Wink from the Universe =

Book by Martin Flanagan

- Author: Martin Flanagan
- Language: English
- Publisher: Penguin Random House
- Publication date: 26 February 2018
- Publication place: Australia
- Media type: Print
- Pages: 336
- ISBN: 978-0143790525
- OCLC: 1024070909

A Wink from the Universe is a 2018 non-fiction book by Australian journalist and author Martin Flanagan about the 2016 Western Bulldogs season, where the team went on to win that year's Australian Football League Grand Final. Flanagan had previously written Southern Sky, Western Oval, a book about the 1993 season of the club then named as "Footscray Football Club".
