= The Line (memoir) =

2005 memoir by Arch Flanagan and Martin Flanagan

- Author: Arch Flanagan and Martin Flanagan
- Cover artist: Craig Russell (design); Australian War Memorial (photograph)
- Language: English
- Genre: Memoir, War
- Publisher: One Day Hill
- Publication date: 2005
- Publication place: Australia
- Media type: Print Paperback
- Pages: 194
- ISBN: 0-9757708-1-0

The Line: a man's experience; a son's quest to understand is a memoir written by Arch and Martin Flanagan. It details Arch Flanagan's experiences as an Australian prisoner of war of Imperial Japan during World War II. The Line is broken up into different parts, with areas written by Martin italicised, whilst areas written by Arch are not.

It is currently being studied by many VCE students across Victoria. For Victorians, it is one of the books which is studied in Encountering Conflict a theme which is presented in the end of year exams for VCE students (2008 -).

== Summary ==
=== Cleveland 1914-1928 ===
A short history of Arch's childhood growing up in rural Tasmania

=== The War Years 1940-1945 and Long Long Ago ===
Most of the memoir is composed of these sections which contain various situations that Arch remembers from his time in the war.

=== Tribute to Weary ===
A tribute written by Arch in memory of Edward (Weary) Dunlop.

=== Brother's Keeper ===
A short work of fiction written by Arch.
