= George Heinz =

Australian rules footballer and coach

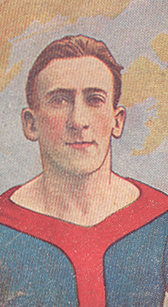

Personal information
- Full name: George Victor Heinz
- Born: 8 October 1891; Ballarat, Victoria
- Died: 3 October 1966 (aged 74); Mount Eliza, Victoria
- Original team: Geelong College
- Height: 169 cm (5 ft 7 in)
- Weight: 73 kg (161 lb)
- Position: Rover

Playing career^{1}
Years	Club	Games (Goals)
1910–1914	Geelong	87 (71)
1919–1925	Melbourne	106 (97)
1927	St Kilda	1 (1)
Total		194 (169)

Coaching career
Years	Club	Games (W–L–D)
1919	Melbourne	16 (0–16–0)
1927	St Kilda	18 (8–10–0)
Total		34 (8–26–0)
- ^{1} Playing statistics correct to the end of 1927.

Career highlights
- Melbourne leading goalkicker: 1919; Melbourne captain: 1919–1920; VFL representative captain: 1920; St Kilda captain: 1927

George Victor Heinz (8 October 1891 – 3 October 1966) was an Australian rules footballer who played for the Geelong Football Club, the Melbourne Football Club, and the St Kilda Football Club in the Victorian Football League (VFL).

== Family ==
The son of George Heinz (1861–1900), licensee of the Athletic Club Hotel, in Ballarat, Victoria, and Louisa Heinz (1866–1950), née Booth, George Victor Heinz was born at Ballarat on 8 October 1891 — although he was born George Heinz, he later chose to be known as Haines, due to the general feeling towards Germany during World War I.

He married Olive Laura Jane Keown (1894–1963) on 2 April 1918.

== Education ==
He was educated at the Geelong College. He played in the school's First XVIII in 1908 and 1909.

== Football ==
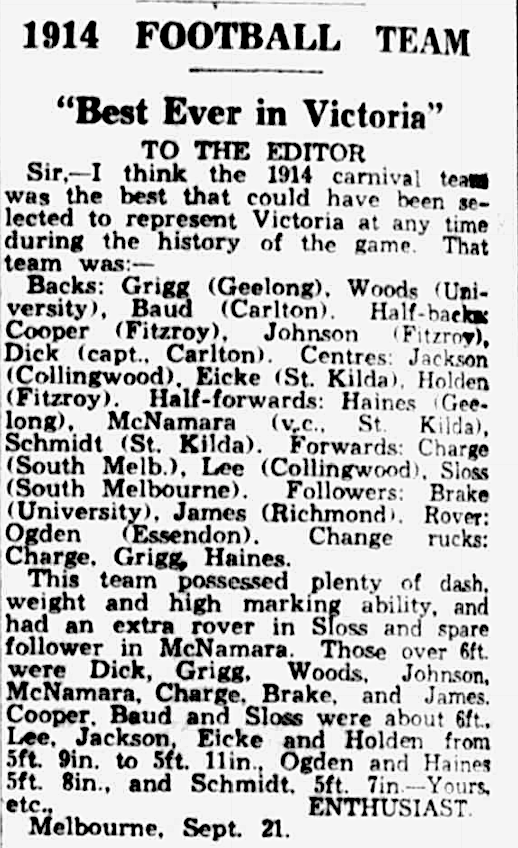
Enthusiast's Letter to the Editor The Herald, 21 September 1934.

=== Geelong (VFL) ===
Heinz played as a rover and made his debut in 1910 for his local club Geelong. The following season he represented Victoria at the Adelaide Carnival. He played his last game for Geelong in 1914 before joining the AIF and missing the next four seasons due to war commitments.

=== Melbourne (VFL) ===
When he returned in 1919 it was with Melbourne and he was named as captain-coach. The club did not win a game all season and he lost his coaching job, although he remained captain for 1920.

=== Representative football ===
He played in VFL representative teams in 1911, 1914, 1920 (he was the team's captain), 1921, 1922, 1923, and 1924.

=== St Kilda (VFL) ===
In 1927 he was appointed non-playing coach of St Kilda, but played and captained them once when they were a player short.

== Death ==
He died at Mount Eliza, Victoria on 3 October 1966.

== See also ==
- 1911 Adelaide Carnival
- 1914 Sydney Carnival
