= Tom Dickson (Australian footballer) =

Australian rules footballer

Personal information
- Full name: Thomas Meiklejohn Dickson
- Born: 9 June 1888; Yarroweyah, Victoria
- Died: 9 April 1958 (aged 69); Melbourne, Victoria
- Original team: Geelong College

Playing career^{1}
Years	Club	Games (Goals)
1908	Geelong	2 (0)
- ^{1} Playing statistics correct to the end of 1908.

Thomas Meiklejohn Dickson (9 June 1888 – 9 April 1958) was an Australian rules footballer who played with Geelong in the Victorian Football League (VFL).

== See also ==
- 1911 Adelaide Carnival
