= Ralph Robertson (Australian footballer) =

Australian rules footballer

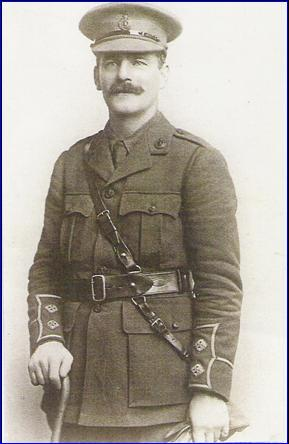

Personal information
- Full name: Ralph Robertson
- Born: 5 August 1882; Aylestone, Leicestershire, England
- Died: 11 May 1917 (aged 34); Abu Qir, Egypt
- Original team: South Beach
- Height: 171 cm (5 ft 7 in)
- Weight: 68 kg (150 lb)
- Position: Rover

Playing career^{1}
Years	Club	Games (Goals)
1899–1900	St Kilda	14 (1)
- ^{1} Playing statistics correct to the end of 1900.

Ralph Robertson (5 August 1882 – 11 May 1917) was an Australian rules footballer who played with St Kilda in the Victorian Football League (VFL) and had a noted career in New South Wales.

Robertson was inducted in the Australian Football Hall of Fame in 2024.

== Family ==
The seventh child of Richard Porteous Robertson (1855–1900), and Jane Abbey Robertson (1851–1912), née Flowers, Ralph Robertson was born at Aylestone, Leicestershire, England on 5 August 1882. He migrated to Australia with his family, arriving in Australia on 5 July 1885, in the S.S. Chimborazo, when he was three years old.

== Football ==
=== St Kilda (VFL) ===
After playing for South Beach in the St Kilda League, he debuted for the Saints' VFL side against South Melbourne, at the Junction Oval, on 2 September 1899.

The only victory in his 14 senior games at St Kilda, was the team's one point win over Melbourne, at the Junction Oval, on 5 May 1900. Although primarily a rover, Robertson could also play as a centreman and up forward.

=== Rugby Union (Fitzroy) ===
Robertson came to Sydney in 1902 — with his employment as the country representative of the wheat merchants John Darling and Son — and, as there was no substantial Australian rules football competition at the time, he took up rugby union, playing with the Fitzroy Club in the City and Suburban Rugby Union. In June 1902, he played in a representative City and Suburban team against a combined Bega District Union team.

=== East Sydney ===
The NSW Australian Football Association began its competition in 1903, and Robertson was appointed vice captain of East Sydney for the club's inaugural season — in which they won the premiership.

"Robertson, of East Sydney, has fully earned the title of "champion of the [1903] season". Not a bad game can be debited to him, and his play has been invariably characterised by fairness, brilliancy, and cleverness. ... [with] [Bertie] Loel (North Shore) [being] the nearest approach to Robertson for all-round excellence. — The Referee, 16 September 1903.

=== North Shore ===
He transferred to North Shore in 1909 and the following season played in another premiership team.

=== Interstate football ===
Among his 41 interstate matches for New South Wales (1903–1914), he captained the state at the 1908 Melbourne, 1911 Adelaide and 1914 Sydney carnivals; and, for his performance at the Sydney Carnival, Robertson was awarded a Referee Medal as the NSW team's best player. Reports at the time suggested that Robertson would have been among those selected for an All-Australian team had they been selected at the time, especially in 1914.

== Military service ==
=== AN&MEF ===
Robertson enlisted in the Australian Naval & Military Expeditionary Force on 11 August 1914, the day enlistments opened. He served in German New Guinea from 12 September, returning to Australia as a corporal in early 1915. He was discharged on 4 March 1915.

=== AIF ===
He enlisted in the AIF in April 1915, and was discharged, at his own request 10 days later.

=== British Army ===
He went to England, enlisted there, initially with the Hampshire Regiment as a second lieutenant, and, eventually, serving with the Royal Flying Corps.

== Death ==
He was killed on 11 May 1917, on active service, in Egypt, when the plane he was flying, crashed directly into another over Egypt.

Robertson, an experienced pilot, flying his Bristol Scout directly into the setting sun, was blinded, and met the other plane, piloted by a novice (on his second-only flight), coming in the opposite direction, nose to nose (with an estimated aggregate speed of 140 mph/225 kph), and both were killed instantly.

=== Burial ===
He was buried at the Alexandria (Hadra) War Memorial Cemetery, in Egypt.

== Recognition ==
In 2003 he was honoured as one of the inaugural members of the official Sydney AFL Hall of Fame, and was an inaugural inductee into the NSW Australian Football Hall of Fame in 2024.

In 2024, Robertson was inducted into the Australian Football Hall of Fame, after former Sydney Swans president Richard Colless had been advocating for his nomination for many years: "He was a pioneer because he demonstrated that it was possible to play the game in Sydney and match it with the best in the country."

== See also ==
- List of Victorian Football League players who died on active service
- 1908 Melbourne Carnival
