= Herb Burleigh =

Australian rules footballer

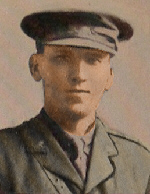
- Burleigh in his WWI uniform

Personal information
- Full name: Herbert Burleigh
- Born: 14 June 1892; Nirranda, Victoria
- Died: 2 November 1975 (aged 83); Ceduna, South Australia
- Original team: Morwell
- Debut: Round 3, 1914, Carlton vs. University, at MCG
- Height: 184 cm (6 ft 0 in)
- Weight: 80 kg (176 lb)

Playing career^{1}
Years	Club	Games (Goals)
1914–1919	Carlton	32 (55)
- ^{1} Playing statistics correct to the end of 1919.

Herbert Burleigh (14 June 1892 – 2 November 1975) was an Australian rules footballer in the Victorian Football League (VFL).

Burleigh made his debut for the Carlton Football Club in Round 3 of the 1914 season. In 1915 he played as centre half forward and was Carlton's leading goalkicker for the season. He enlisted during the 1915 season but deferred his call up until after Carlton had won the 1915 VFL Grand Final.

In September 1917 his right forearm was severely injured and, despite surgery, it was clear that his front-line military service was over. In January, 1918, he returned to Australia and was later discharged from the army as medically unfit.

Despite his injury, Burleigh was determined to return to football and he managed three more games in the 1919 season before his war injury forced him into retirement.

Burleigh returned to his original career of teaching in 1920, and spent the rest of his life teaching, mainly in rural communities.
