= John Dunn (Australian rules footballer) =

Playing career
Years	Club	Games (Goals)
1914–1919	Port Adelaide	

Career highlights
- Port Adelaide premiership player (1914); SAFL leading goal-kicker (1914); Port Adelaide leading goal-kicker (1914)

John Dunn was an Australian rules footballer for the Port Adelaide Football Club.
