= 1915 VFL season =

19th season of the Victorian Football League (VFL)

1915 VFL premiership season
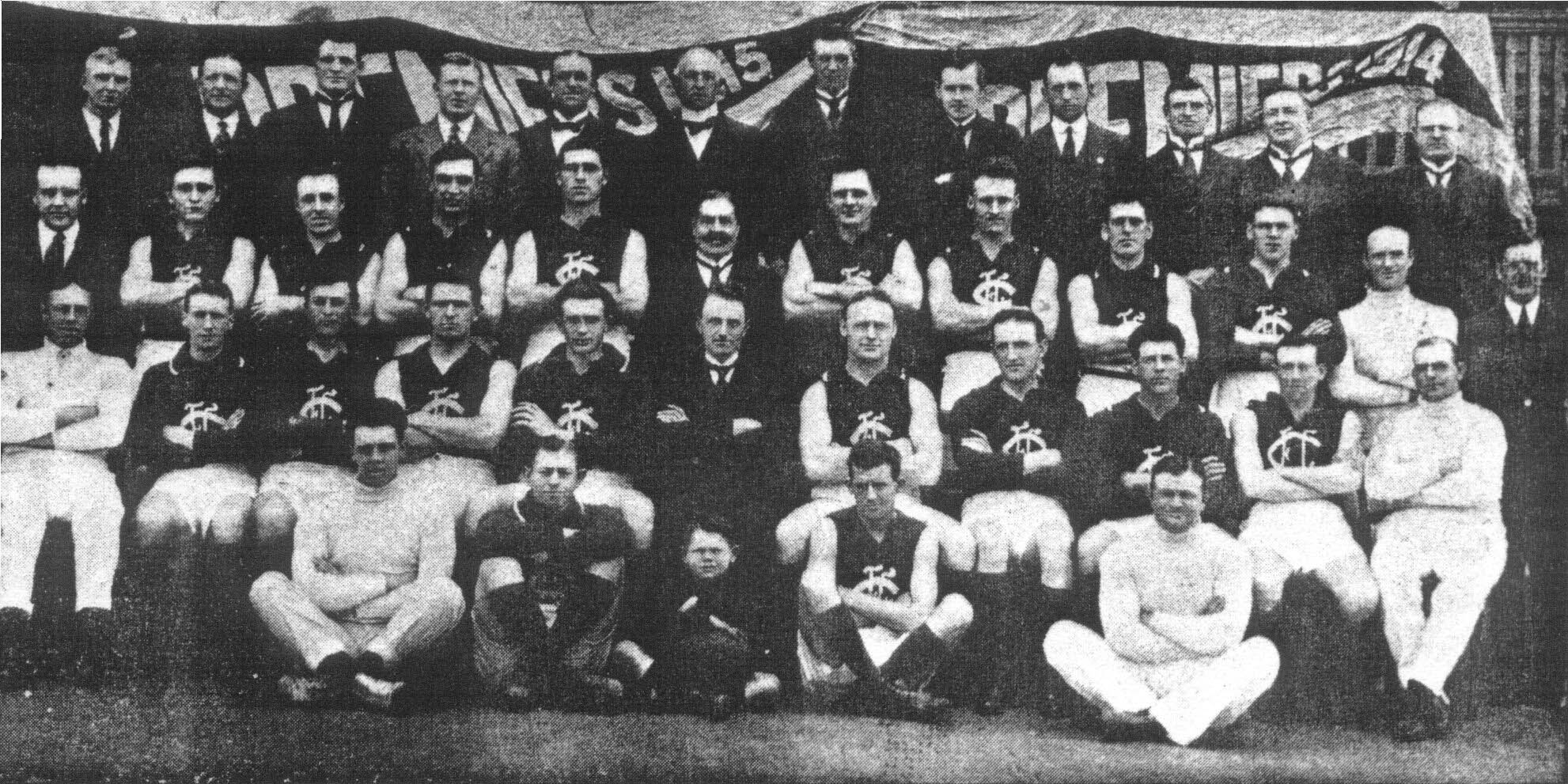
- Carlton 1915 VFL premiership team
- Date: 24 April – 18 September 1915
- Teams: 9
- Premiers: Carlton; 5th premiership
- Minor premiers: Collingwood; 4th minor premiership
- Leading goalkicker medallist: Jimmy Freake (Fitzroy); 65 goals
- Matches played: 76

The 1915 VFL season was the 19th season of the Victorian Football League (VFL), the highest-level senior Australian rules football competition in Victoria. The season featured nine clubs and ran from 24 April to 18 September, comprising a 16-match home-and-away season followed by a four-week finals series featuring the top four clubs.

Carlton won the premiership, defeating Collingwood by 33 points in the 1915 VFL grand final; it was Carlton's second consecutive premiership and fifth VFL premiership overall. Collingwood won the minor premiership by finishing atop the home-and-away ladder with a 14–2 win–loss record. Fitzroy's Jimmy Freake won the leading goalkicker medal as the league's leading goalkicker.

== Background ==
In 1915, the VFL competition consisted of nine teams of 18 on-the-field players each, with no "reserves", although any of the 18 players who had left the playing field for any reason could later resume their place on the field at any time during the match. With the VFL being reduced to nine clubs, a bye was required in the fixture for the first time in the league's history. Each team played each other twice in a home-and-away season of 18 rounds (i.e., 16 matches and 2 byes); once the 18 round home-and-away season had finished, the 1915 VFL Premiers were determined by the specific format and conventions of the amended "Argus system".

== Home-and-away season ==
=== Round 1 ===
Home team	Home team score	Away team	Away team score	Venue	Date
St Kilda	8.16 (64)	South Melbourne	4.13 (37)	Junction Oval	24 April 1915
Melbourne	12.10 (82)	Richmond	11.7 (73)	MCG	24 April 1915
Collingwood	7.10 (52)	Essendon	3.8 (26)	Victoria Park	24 April 1915
Carlton	5.11 (41)	Fitzroy	6.5 (41)	Princes Park	24 April 1915

=== Round 2 ===
Home team	Home team score	Away team	Away team score	Venue	Date
Geelong	7.14 (56)	St Kilda	6.18 (54)	Corio Oval	1 May 1915
Fitzroy	14.17 (101)	Melbourne	9.2 (56)	Brunswick Street Oval	1 May 1915
Richmond	4.6 (30)	Collingwood	12.11 (83)	Punt Road Oval	1 May 1915
South Melbourne	6.11 (47)	Carlton	8.12 (60)	Lake Oval	1 May 1915

=== Round 3 ===
Home team	Home team score	Away team	Away team score	Venue	Date
Richmond	9.15 (69)	South Melbourne	8.19 (67)	Punt Road Oval	8 May 1915
Essendon	4.10 (34)	Fitzroy	16.6 (102)	EMCG	8 May 1915
Melbourne	15.12 (102)	Geelong	12.11 (83)	MCG	8 May 1915
St Kilda	7.14 (56)	Collingwood	10.16 (76)	Junction Oval	8 May 1915

=== Round 4 ===
Home team	Home team score	Away team	Away team score	Venue	Date
Geelong	4.10 (34)	Richmond	10.11 (71)	Corio Oval	15 May 1915
Fitzroy	5.19 (49)	St Kilda	2.6 (18)	Brunswick Street Oval	15 May 1915
Collingwood	9.13 (67)	Melbourne	5.9 (39)	Victoria Park	15 May 1915
Carlton	3.13 (31)	Essendon	8.8 (56)	Princes Park	15 May 1915

=== Round 5 ===
Home team	Home team score	Away team	Away team score	Venue	Date
Essendon	7.10 (52)	St Kilda	6.4 (40)	EMCG	22 May 1915
Collingwood	8.14 (62)	Geelong	3.12 (30)	Victoria Park	22 May 1915
South Melbourne	8.8 (56)	Fitzroy	6.4 (40)	Lake Oval	22 May 1915
Melbourne	8.3 (51)	Carlton	10.12 (72)	MCG	22 May 1915

=== Round 6 ===
Home team	Home team score	Away team	Away team score	Venue	Date
Essendon	8.7 (55)	South Melbourne	8.16 (64)	EMCG	29 May 1915
St Kilda	9.11 (65)	Melbourne	13.11 (89)	Junction Oval	29 May 1915
Richmond	7.12 (54)	Fitzroy	8.12 (60)	Punt Road Oval	29 May 1915
Geelong	5.10 (40)	Carlton	9.13 (67)	Corio Oval	29 May 1915

=== Round 7 ===
Home team	Home team score	Away team	Away team score	Venue	Date
Essendon	12.6 (78)	Geelong	12.8 (80)	EMCG	5 June 1915
Carlton	11.9 (75)	Collingwood	10.13 (73)	Princes Park	5 June 1915
Richmond	7.6 (48)	St Kilda	5.20 (50)	Punt Road Oval	7 June 1915
South Melbourne	7.5 (47)	Melbourne	10.8 (68)	Lake Oval	7 June 1915

=== Round 8 ===
Home team	Home team score	Away team	Away team score	Venue	Date
Carlton	15.17 (107)	Richmond	8.5 (53)	Princes Park	12 June 1915
South Melbourne	14.17 (101)	Geelong	13.5 (83)	Lake Oval	12 June 1915
Melbourne	10.12 (72)	Essendon	6.17 (53)	MCG	12 June 1915
Fitzroy	6.14 (50)	Collingwood	11.8 (74)	Brunswick Street Oval	12 June 1915

=== Round 9 ===
Home team	Home team score	Away team	Away team score	Venue	Date
Essendon	5.6 (36)	Richmond	5.8 (38)	EMCG	19 June 1915
Collingwood	5.13 (43)	South Melbourne	3.10 (28)	Victoria Park	19 June 1915
Geelong	4.12 (36)	Fitzroy	10.12 (72)	Corio Oval	19 June 1915
St Kilda	1.1 (7)	Carlton	5.15 (45)	Junction Oval	19 June 1915

=== Round 10 ===
Home team	Home team score	Away team	Away team score	Venue	Date
South Melbourne	9.11 (65)	St Kilda	7.5 (47)	Lake Oval	26 June 1915
Richmond	8.12 (60)	Melbourne	10.11 (71)	Punt Road Oval	26 June 1915
Essendon	5.12 (42)	Collingwood	11.12 (78)	EMCG	26 June 1915
Fitzroy	7.8 (50)	Carlton	5.8 (38)	Brunswick Street Oval	26 June 1915

=== Round 11 ===
Home team	Home team score	Away team	Away team score	Venue	Date
Collingwood	10.20 (80)	Richmond	6.7 (43)	Victoria Park	3 July 1915
Carlton	7.15 (57)	South Melbourne	7.5 (47)	Princes Park	3 July 1915
St Kilda	12.17 (89)	Geelong	8.7 (55)	Junction Oval	3 July 1915
Melbourne	12.13 (85)	Fitzroy	10.13 (73)	MCG	3 July 1915

=== Round 12 ===
Home team	Home team score	Away team	Away team score	Venue	Date
Geelong	5.9 (39)	Melbourne	11.13 (79)	Corio Oval	10 July 1915
Collingwood	17.20 (122)	St Kilda	3.6 (24)	Victoria Park	10 July 1915
South Melbourne	10.12 (72)	Richmond	7.11 (53)	Lake Oval	10 July 1915
Fitzroy	6.12 (48)	Essendon	5.5 (35)	Brunswick Street Oval	10 July 1915

=== Round 13 ===
Home team	Home team score	Away team	Away team score	Venue	Date
Richmond	12.15 (87)	Geelong	12.7 (79)	Punt Road Oval	17 July 1915
St Kilda	7.7 (49)	Fitzroy	14.14 (98)	Junction Oval	17 July 1915
Melbourne	8.6 (54)	Collingwood	12.21 (93)	MCG	17 July 1915
Essendon	5.15 (45)	Carlton	12.15 (87)	EMCG	17 July 1915

=== Round 14 ===
Home team	Home team score	Away team	Away team score	Venue	Date
Fitzroy	8.6 (54)	South Melbourne	7.6 (48)	Brunswick Street Oval	24 July 1915
Carlton	11.8 (74)	Melbourne	5.15 (45)	Princes Park	24 July 1915
St Kilda	10.10 (70)	Essendon	3.13 (31)	Junction Oval	24 July 1915
Geelong	7.9 (51)	Collingwood	13.13 (91)	Corio Oval	24 July 1915

=== Round 15 ===
Home team	Home team score	Away team	Away team score	Venue	Date
Melbourne	9.19 (73)	St Kilda	7.6 (48)	MCG	31 July 1915
Fitzroy	18.17 (125)	Richmond	7.7 (49)	Brunswick Street Oval	31 July 1915
Carlton	9.20 (74)	Geelong	8.12 (60)	Princes Park	31 July 1915
South Melbourne	13.19 (97)	Essendon	6.4 (40)	Lake Oval	31 July 1915

=== Round 16 ===
Home team	Home team score	Away team	Away team score	Venue	Date
Melbourne	4.12 (36)	South Melbourne	5.13 (43)	MCG	7 August 1915
St Kilda	6.18 (54)	Richmond	4.6 (30)	Junction Oval	7 August 1915
Geelong	7.11 (53)	Essendon	6.9 (45)	Corio Oval	7 August 1915
Collingwood	9.8 (62)	Carlton	9.9 (63)	Victoria Park	7 August 1915

=== Round 17 ===
Home team	Home team score	Away team	Away team score	Venue	Date
Geelong	7.10 (52)	South Melbourne	10.14 (74)	Corio Oval	14 August 1915
Essendon	10.15 (75)	Melbourne	7.14 (56)	EMCG	14 August 1915
Collingwood	8.13 (61)	Fitzroy	8.11 (59)	Victoria Park	14 August 1915
Richmond	7.7 (49)	Carlton	17.15 (117)	Punt Road Oval	14 August 1915

=== Round 18 ===
Home team	Home team score	Away team	Away team score	Venue	Date
Fitzroy	18.13 (121)	Geelong	4.7 (31)	Brunswick Street Oval	21 August 1915
Carlton	14.16 (100)	St Kilda	6.8 (44)	Princes Park	21 August 1915
Richmond	14.15 (99)	Essendon	6.11 (47)	Punt Road Oval	21 August 1915
South Melbourne	4.9 (33)	Collingwood	7.9 (51)	Lake Oval	21 August 1915

== Ladder ==
(P)	Premiers
	Qualified for finals

#	Team	P	W	L	D	PF	PA	%	Pts
1	Collingwood	16	14	2	0	1168	703	166.1	56
2	Carlton (P)	16	13	2	1	1108	770	143.9	54
3	Fitzroy	16	11	4	1	1143	765	149.4	46
4	Melbourne	16	9	7	0	1058	1066	99.2	36
5	South Melbourne	16	8	8	0	926	872	106.2	32
6	Richmond	16	5	11	0	906	1164	77.8	20
7	St Kilda	16	5	11	0	779	1026	75.9	20
8	Essendon	16	3	13	0	750	1067	70.3	12
9	Geelong	16	3	13	0	862	1267	68.0	12

Rules for classification: 1. premiership points; 2. percentage; 3. points for
Average score: 60.4
Source: AFL Tables

== Finals series ==
All of the 1915 finals were played at the MCG so the home team in the semi-finals and Preliminary Final is purely the higher ranked team from the ladder but in the Grand Final the home team was the team that won the Preliminary Final.

=== Semi finals ===
Home team	Score	Away team	Score	Venue	Date
Carlton	11.12 (78)	Melbourne	10.7 (67)	MCG	28 August
Fitzroy	9.16 (70)	Collingwood	4.12 (36)	MCG	4 September

=== Preliminary Final ===
Home team	Score	Away team	Score	Venue	Date
Carlton	6.18 (54)	Fitzroy	5.8 (38)	MCG	11 September

== Season notes ==
- Prior to the season, VFL delegates voted in favour of rule changes to bring the game closer to a hybridisation of Australian rules football and rugby league: specifically the addition of a crossbar to the goal posts over which goals were to be kicked, disallowing forward handpasses, and rules to allow stronger rugby-style tackling between the shoulders and the hips. The rules could not come into immediate effect as they required approval at a vote of Australasian Football Council delegates, and this vote never took place due to the war, so none of these changes were ever implemented.
- The first round of the 1915 was played on Saturday 24 April 1915, one day before the forces of the Australian and New Zealand Army Corps landed at ANZAC Cove in their first hostile action in World War I.
- As a result of World War I St Kilda changed its traditional colours of red, white, and black (the colours of the German Empire) to red, yellow, and black, the colours of Australian ally Belgium.
- On 12 March 1915, responding to intense public pressure, a motion was put to a VFL meeting (proposed by the Geelong delegate, seconded by the Melbourne delegate) to suspend the VFL competition for the entire season (in March 1915, nobody expected the war to last for as long as it did). The votes were Geelong, Melbourne, Essendon, St Kilda, and South Melbourne "for", and the inner-Melbourne clubs of Carlton, Fitzroy, Collingwood, and Richmond "against". In the absence of the required three-quarters majority, the motion was lost.
- At the instigation of the SAFL, interstate matches were suspended.
- At 2:00PM on Saturday 29 May 1915, Essendon centreman and 1914 Victorian State wingman, Cyril Gove, rode the racehorse Menthe into third place in the Springbank Corinthian Handicap. a race for amateur riders, at Moonee Valley Racecourse. Immediately the race was over, he caught a fast cab down Mount Alexander Road, Melbourne to the East Melbourne Cricket Ground, where he played a full game for Essendon in its round 6 match against South Melbourne.

== Awards ==
- The 1915 VFL Premiership team was Carlton.
- The VFL's leading goalkicker were Dick Lee of Collingwood and Jimmy Freake of Fitzroy with 66 goals each.
- Geelong took the "wooden spoon" in 1915.

== Sources ==
- 1915 VFL season at AFL Tables
- 1915 VFL season at Australian Football
