= Cecil Curnow =

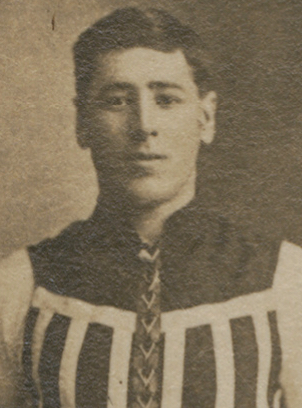

Personal information
- Full name: Frederick Cecil Curnow
- Born: 13 April 1887; East Moonta, South Australia
- Died: 12 May 1958 (aged 71)
- Position: Ruckman

Playing career
Years	Club	Games (Goals)
1906–1908	Waihi (NZ)	
1909	South Adelaide	8 (6)
1910–1911	Port Adelaide	17 (10)
1912–1915	Sturt	50 (11)
1919–1923	North Adelaide	63 (33)

Representative team honours
Years	Team	Games (Goals)
1908	North Island (NZ)	
1910, 1921	South Australia	2 (0)

Career highlights
- Championship of Australia (1910); Port Adelaide premiership player (1910); Sturt premiership player (1915); North Adelaide premiership player {1920}

Frederick Cecil Curnow (13 April 1887 – 12 May 1958) was an Australian rules footballer who played in New Zealand for Waihi, whilst also representing the North Island, and also played in the South Australian Football League for South Adelaide, Port Adelaide, Sturt and North Adelaide, also representing South Australia in interstate football.
