= William Boon (footballer) =

Personal information
- Full name: William Irving Boon
- Born: 1892
- Died: 24 April 1918 (aged 26); Maricourt, Somme, France

Playing career
Years	Club	Games (Goals)
1913–1915	Port Adelaide	40

Career highlights
- 2x Port Adelaide premiership player (1913, 1914); 2x Champion of Australia (1913, 1914)

William Boon (1892 – 24 April 1918) was an Australian rules footballer for the Port Adelaide Football Club in the South Australian Football League. Boon was killed whilst serving Australia in Maricourt, France during World War I.
