= The Game in Time of War =

- Author: Martin Flanagan
- Publisher: Pan Macmillan
- ISBN: 0330364502

The Game in Time of War is a collection of essays and newspaper articles written by Australian journalist Martin Flanagan about Australian rules football. The theme of the content is analysis of the relation between Australian football and the participation of Australian people in wars.

Ross Fitzgerald wrote that the book's first essay described the impact of 9/11 on Australian football in compelling terms, but that it was a disjointed "Stream of consciousness" in the other essays. In a 2019 opinion piece Australian politician Tony Buti called the book "excellent" and noted that included mentions of Alf Baud
