= Jack Dawson (Australian rules footballer) =

Australian rules footballer

Personal information
- Full name: John Dawson
- Born: 4 October 1885; Hobart, Tasmania
- Died: 23 June 1964 (aged 78); Sydney, NSW
- Height: 170 cm (5 ft 7 in)

Playing career^{1}
Years	Club	Games (Goals)
1907	Fitzroy	13 (0)
- ^{1} Playing statistics correct to the end of 1907.

Jack Dawson (4 October 1885 – 23 June 1964) was an Australian rules footballer who played with Fitzroy in the Victorian Football League (VFL).

== See also ==
- 1911 Adelaide Carnival
