= Dave Greenham =

Australian rules footballer (1889–1945)

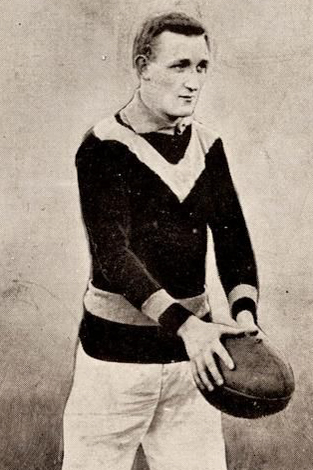
- Greenham in 1910

Personal information
- Full name: David Peter Greenham
- Born: 14 February 1889; Dartmoor, Victoria
- Died: 4 January 1945 (aged 55); Richmond, Victoria
- Original team: Wesley College

Playing career^{1}
Years	Club	Games (Goals)
1909–12	University	51 (9)
- ^{1} Playing statistics correct to the end of 1912.

David Peter Greenham (14 February 1889 – 4 January 1945) was an Australian rules footballer who played with University in the Victorian Football League (VFL).

== Family ==
The son of James Greenham (1850–1921), and Margaret Greenham (1847–1928), née Iverach, David Peter Greenham was born at Dartmoor, Victoria on 14 February 1889.

He married Amelia "Millie" Susan Gray (1888–1961) on 15 January 1920.

== Education ==
He attended Wesley College, and went on to study medicine at the University of Melbourne, where he was a resident at Queen's College. He graduated, Bachelor of Medicine and Bachelor of Surgery, on 23 December 1911.

== Military service ==
He enlisted in the First AIF in November 1917, and served overseas with the Australian Army Medical Corps.

== Death ==
He died, in a private hospital, in Melbourne, on 4 January 1945.

== See also ==
- 1911 Adelaide Carnival

== Sources ==
- Holmesby, Russell & Main, Jim (2007). The Encyclopedia of AFL Footballers. 7th ed. Melbourne: Bas Publishing.
- First World War Nominal Roll: Captain David Peter Greenham collection of the Australian War Museum.
- First World War Embarkation Roll: Captain David Peter Greenham collection of the Australian War Museum.
- First World War Service Record: Captain David Peter Greenham, National Archives of Australia.
- Group portrait of medical officers at No. 1 Australian Auxiliary Hospital collection of the Australian War Museum: Greenham is third from left, back row.
