= Cyril Gove =

Australian rules footballer

Personal information
- Full name: Cyril George Gove
- Born: 10 January 1890; St Kilda, Victoria
- Died: 28 August 1973 (aged 83); Deniliquin, New South Wales
- Original team: Collegians
- Height: 168 cm (5 ft 6 in)
- Weight: 55 kg (121 lb)
- Position: Wingman

Playing career^{1}
Years	Club	Games (Goals)
1913–15, 1918	Essendon	28 (3)
- ^{1} Playing statistics correct to the end of 1918.

Cyril George Gove (10 January 1890 – 28 August 1973) was an Australian rules footballer who played with Essendon in the Victorian Football League (VFL).

== Family ==
The son of Julius Gove (1854–1922), and Catherine Gove (1860–1923), née Blyth, Cyril George Gove was born on 10 January 1890. He married Olga Macaw (1907–1984) on 27 October 1932.

== Football ==
Gove, from St Thomas' Grammar School, Essendon, played his early football for the Collegians. A wiry wingman, he played 16 games in the 1914 VFL season and was chosen to represent the VFL in the Sydney Carnival.

== Amateur jockey ==
April, 1914

In April 1914, Gove rode five winners at the Southern Riverina Turf Club Picnic Meeting in Deniliquin.

29 May 1915

At 2:00 p.m. on Saturday 29 May 1915, Gove rode the racehorse Menthe into third place in the Springbank Corinthian Handicap, a race for amateur riders, at Moonee Valley Racecourse. Immediately the race was over, he caught a fast cab down Mount Alexander Road, Melbourne to the East Melbourne Cricket Ground, and by 3:00 p.m. he was playing for Essendon (and was one of its best players) in its round 6 match against South Melbourne.

== Death ==
He died in Deniliquin, New South Wales on 28 August 1973, aged 83.

== See also ==
- 1914 Sydney Carnival
