= Charles Anderson (Australian footballer) =

Playing career
Years	Club	Games (Goals)
1909, 1912–1915	Port Adelaide	35 (24)

Career highlights
- Port Adelaide premiership player (1914)

Charles Anderson was an Australian rules footballer for the Port Adelaide Football Club in the South Australian Football League.
