= Horrie Jones =

Australian rules footballer

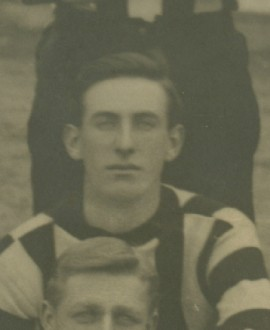
- Jones in 1910

Personal information
- Full name: Horace Stanley Jones
- Born: 10 June 1888; Prahran, Victoria
- Died: 4 October 1967 (aged 79); Canterbury, Victoria
- Original team: Caulfield
- Height: 180 cm (5 ft 11 in)
- Weight: 81 kg (179 lb)

Playing career^{1}
| Years | Club | Games (Goals) |
| 1910–11 | Collingwood | 14 (2) |
- ^{1} Playing statistics correct to the end of 1911.

Horace Stanley Jones (10 June 1888 – 4 October 1967) was an Australian rules footballer who played with Collingwood in the Victorian Football League (VFL).
