= Eric Woods =

Australian rules footballer

Personal information
- Full name: Eric William Beresford Woods
- Born: 12 December 1892; Albury, New South Wales
- Died: 12 August 1936 (aged 43); Melbourne
- Original team: Scotch College
- Position: Defender

Playing career^{1}
| Years | Club | Games (Goals) |
| 1911–1914 | University | 34 (0) |
- ^{1} Playing statistics correct to the end of 1914.

Eric William Beresford Woods MC (12 December 1892 – 12 August 1936) was an Australian rules footballer who played with University in the Victorian Football League (VFL). Away from football he was a medical student, and after serving in World War I he returned to Australia and did not continue his VFL career.

== Family ==
The son of William Cleaver Woods (1852–1943), and Margaret Mollie Woods (1864–1944), née Grieve, Eric William Beresford Woods was born at Albury, New South Wales on 12 December 1892.

He married Mary Elizabeth Nugent (1898–1986) in 1923. They had twin sons, born in 1924.

== Education ==
He was educated at Scotch College, Melbourne, and at the University of Melbourne, where he studied medicine, graduating Bachelor of Medicine and Bachelor of Surgery (M.B.B.S.) on 8 April 1916.

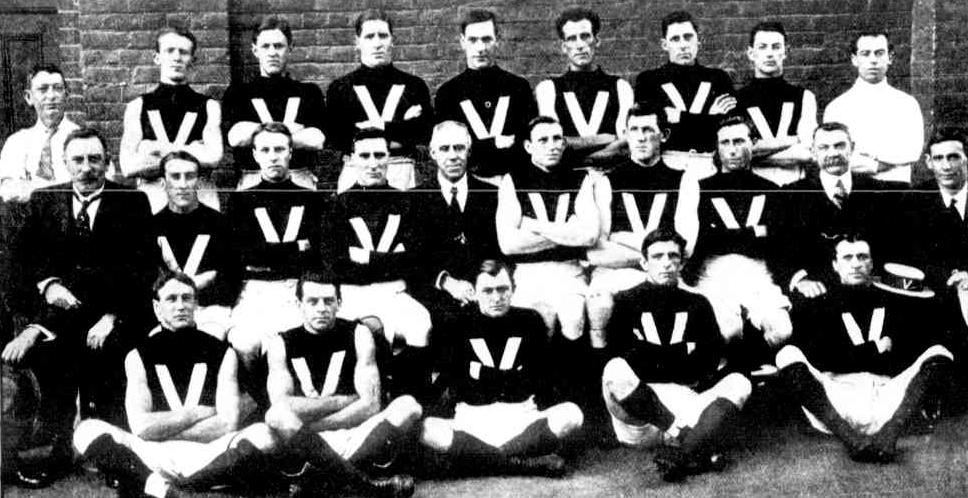
Victorian Football Team (1914). Woods is second player from left, back row.

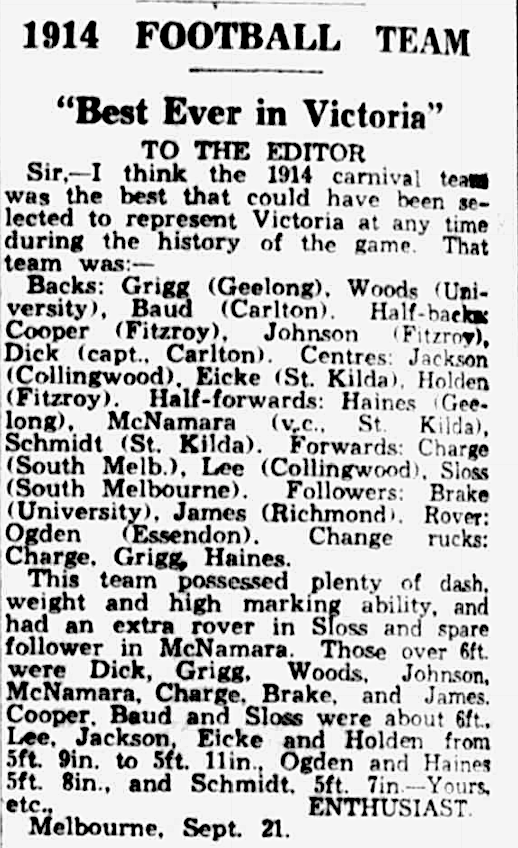
Enthusiast's Letter to the Editor The Herald, 21 Sept. 1934.

== Football ==
Dr. Eric W. B. Woods, formerly of Hay, and a medical officer in the A.I.F., who died in a private hospital in Melbourne yesterday was one of Victoria's outstanding footballers in the years immediately preceding the war. He was the University full back between the years 1910 and 1914, when that team played in the League, and was selected as full back for Victoria in the Sydney carnival of 1914. ... In the opinion of Gerald Brosnan, who coached University at that time and was a selector of the Victorian team, Woods was one of the greatest full backs the game has known. He was not only one of the longest drop kicks in living memory, but a brilliant mark. — Sun News-Pictorial, 13 August 1936.

He played inter-university football for Melbourne University, and, in addition to playing in 34 matches for the University in the VFL competition over four seasons (1911 to 1914), he also played for the VFL at the 1914 Sydney Carnival.

== Military service ==
He enlisted in the First AIF in November 1914, served overseas (as Sergeant Woods, 1455), and returned to Australia to complete his medical degree, graduated, re-enlisted, served overseas (now, as Captain Woods), and returned to Australia on 23 September 1919.

=== Military Cross ===
In August 1918 he was awarded the Military Cross:

Captain ERIC WILLIAM BERESFORD WOODS, A.M.C.
For conspicuous gallantry and devotion to duty. For several days he worked at his aid post under very heavy shell fire, attending to all stretcher cases in the open with great courage and complete disregard of danger. His untiring energy and organization saved many lives.

The original recommendation for the award of the Military Cross, dated 2 October 1917, by Lieutenant Colonel Charles Stewart Davies, read as follows:

Captain E.W.B. Woods, A.A.M.C. was in charge of the aid post of my Battalion [viz., 32nd Australian Infantry Battalion] when in the front line. At Polygon Wood near Hooge from the 28th. September to 1st. October 1917 the Pill-box was under heavy shell fire. Captain Woods had to treat all stretcher cases in the open which he did with great courage. His arrangements for getting extra men as stretcher bearers from Battalion at the right moment and his untiring energy undoubtedly saved many lives. He set a splendid example to all ranks. — collection of the Australian War Museum.

== Death ==
He died at a private hospital in Melbourne on 12 August 1936.

== See also ==
- 1914 Sydney Carnival
