= Sam Mortimer =

Australian rules footballer

Personal information
- Full name: Samuel Alan Mortimer
- Born: 18 November 1892; Melbourne, Victoria
- Died: 8 November 1967 (aged 74); Perth, Western Australia
- Original team: Queenscliff
- Height: 180 cm (5 ft 11 in)
- Weight: 71 kg (157 lb)

Playing career^{1}
Years	Club	Games (Goals)
1911	St Kilda	1 (1)
1912	Brunswick (VFA)	1 (0)
1915	Collingwood	10 (0)
- ^{1} Playing statistics correct to the end of 1915.

Samuel Alan Mortimer (18 November 1892 – 8 November 1967) was an Australian rules footballer who played with St Kilda and Collingwood in the Victorian Football League (VFL).
