= Marshall Herbert =

Australian rules footballer

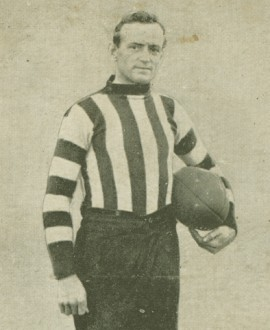
- Herbert in 1910

Personal information
- Full name: Marshall Embleton Herbert
- Born: 3 August 1877; Brighton, Victoria
- Died: 26 May 1953 (aged 75); St Kilda, Victoria
- Original team: Redfern
- Height: 179 cm (5 ft 10 in)
- Weight: 83 kg (183 lb)

Playing career^{1}
Years	Club	Games (Goals)
1908–10	Collingwood	51 (8)
- ^{1} Playing statistics correct to the end of 1910.

Marshall Embleton Herbert (3 August 1877 – 26 May 1953) was an Australian rules footballer who played with Collingwood in the Victorian Football League (VFL).
