= Horrie Pope =

Australian rules footballer (1887-1949)

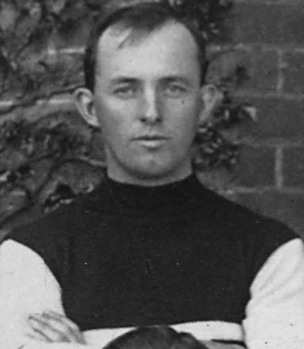

Personal information
- Full name: Horace Victor Pope
- Born: 5 June 1887; North Adelaide, South Australia
- Died: 19 June 1949 (aged 62); Franklin, South Australia

Playing career
Years	Club	Games (Goals)
1905–1920	Port Adelaide	156 (46)

Career highlights
- 3× Port Adelaide premiership player (1906, 1913, 1914); 3× Championship of Australia (1910, 1913, 1914)

Horace Victor Pope (5 June 1887 – 19 June 1949) was an Australian rules footballer who played for Port Adelaide. He captained the club in the second half of 1919.

== Family ==
The son of Rev. Henry James Pope (1844–1919), and Grace Holman Pope (1857–1920), née Temby, Horace Victor Pope was born in North Adelaide on 5 June 1887.

He married Eliza Hilda Williams (1880–1957) on 1 July 1912, They had three children: a stillborn daughter, and two sons, Kenneth Charles Pope (1917–1944), and Richard Horace Pope (1919–1942).

== Football ==
From 1905 to 1919, Horrie Pope played 155 games for Port Adelaide; and he also played in one additional game in 1920. When Alex "Bandy" McFarlane resigned mid-way through the 1919 season, Pope was appointed captain of the team.

== Death ==
Horrie Pope died at his home at Franklin (now known as Pennington, South Australia) on 19 June 1949, and was buried at the Cheltenham Cemetery on 21 June 1949.
