= Charlie Hackett (footballer) =

Australian rules footballer

Personal information
- Full name: Charles Ernest Hackett
- Born: 16 April 1885; Brunswick, Victoria
- Died: 27 March 1963 (aged 77); Yarrambat, Victoria
- Original team: Abbotsford
- Height: 174 cm (5 ft 9 in)
- Weight: 80 kg (176 lb)

Playing career^{1}
Years	Club	Games (Goals)
1910	Collingwood	9 (0)
- ^{1} Playing statistics correct to the end of 1910.

Charles Ernest Hackett (16 April 1885 – 27 March 1963) was an Australian rules footballer who played with Collingwood in the Victorian Football League (VFL).
