= Martin Flanagan (journalist) =

Australian journalist and author

- Born: Martin Joseph Flanagan; 1955 (age 70–71); Launceston, Tasmania, Australia
- Education: University of Tasmania
- Occupations: Sportswriter, journalist, columnist
- Relatives: Richard Flanagan (brother)

Martin Joseph Flanagan (born 1955) is an Australian journalist and author. He writes on sport, particularly Australian rules football. Flanagan also writes opinion pieces, some of which are examinations of Australian culture and the relationship between Indigenous and non-Indigenous Australians.

== Life and career ==
Martin Flanagan is one of six children of Arch Flanagan, a survivor of the Burma Death Railway. He is descended from Irish convicts transported to Van Diemen's Land in the 1840s. He grew up in Tasmania, graduated in Law at the University of Tasmania, and now lives in Melbourne. One of his three brothers is Tasmanian author, historian and film director Richard Flanagan. He attended secondary school at Marist Regional College in Burnie.

Flanagan has written 16 books, including the novel The Call (1998), an "historical imagining" into the life of Tom Wills, the enigmatic father of Australian rules football and captain-coach of the first Aboriginal cricket team. Flanagan portrays Wills as a tragic figure caught between white and black Australia, and postulates that the Aboriginal game of Marngrook influenced his conception of Australian rules football. Flanagan subsequently became embroiled in football's "history wars" which received significant coverage in the national media in 2008, the year of the game's 150th anniversary celebrations. He and Bruce Myles adapted The Call into a stage play of the same name, which premiered at Melbourne's Malthouse Theatre in 2004.

The Game in Time of War (2003) is a collection of essays Flanagan wrote on the role that Australian rules football plays during wartime. He co-authored the non-fiction books The Line (2005) with his father Arch Flanagan, and The Fight (2006) with Tom Uren. Flanagan has also written biographies of Australian rules footballers: Richo (2010) on Matthew Richardson and The Short Long Book (2015) on Michael Long. In 2023 he published a memoir, The Empty Honour Board.

== Bibliography ==
=== Novels ===
- Going Away (1993)
- The Call (1998)

=== Poetry ===
- Shorts: Poems (1984)

=== Children's ===
- Archie's Letter: An ANZAC Story (2012)

=== Non-Fiction ===
- One of the Crowd (1990)
- Family Matters (1993)
- Southern Sky, Western Oval (1994)
- 1970 (1999)
- In Sunshine or in Shadow (2002)
- The Game in Time of War (2003)
- Faces in the Crowd (2005)
- The Line: A Man's Experience: A Son's Quest to Understand Arch Flanagan (2005)
- The Fight (2006) with Tom Uren
- Richo (2010) with Matthew Richardson
- The Short Long Book (2015) with Michael Long
- A Wink from the Universe (2018)
- The Tom Wills Picture Show (2018)
- The Art of Pollination: A Year with the Irrepressible Jane Tewson (2020)
- The Empty Honour Board: A School Memoir (2023)

=== Drama ===
- The Call (2004)
