= Harry Haughton =

Australian rules footballer and coach

Personal information
- Full name: Henry Irwin Haughton
- Born: 2 January 1886; Whanganui, New Zealand
- Died: 19 January 1958 (aged 72); South Australia
- Original team: Northcote
- Height: 182 cm (6 ft 0 in)
- Weight: 83 kg (183 lb)
- Position: Defender/Ruck

Playing career^{1}
Years	Club	Games (Goals)
1908–10	Northcote (VFA)	18 (4)
1912–19	Carlton (VFL)	113 (49)

Representative team honours^{2}
Years	Team	Games (Goals)
1913–14	Victoria	? (?)
- ^{1} Playing statistics correct to the end of 1922.^{2} Representative statistics correct as of 1914.

Henry Irwin Haughton (2 January 1886 – 19 January 1958) was an Australian rules footballer who played for Carlton in the Victorian Football League (VFL) during the 1910s.

== Football ==
=== Northcote (VFA) ===
A versatile player from Northcote, Haughton was already 26 when recruited by Carlton but still managed to play for eight seasons.

=== Carlton (VFL) ===
He was a dual premiership player at Carlton, appearing in their winning 1914 and 1915 Grand Final teams. In the first Grand Final he was used on a half back flank but played in the ruck the following year. Haughton, a New Zealander by birth, was also a member of the side which lost the 1916 Grand Final.

=== Representative teams ===
While at Carlton he represented the VFL at interstate football in 1913 and at the 1914 Sydney Carnival.

=== Williamstown (VFA) ===
He finished his career back in the Victorian Football Association where he was appointed captain-coach of Williamstown in 1920. He stepped down from the coaching role in 1921 but stayed on as a player and starred at centre half-forward in Williamstown's premiership victory over Footscray at Fitzroy's Brunswick St Oval, where Williamstown defeated Footscray by 3 goals, 8.9 to 5.9. He played on at age 36 until half-way through 1922 before taking up a country coaching position. He played a total of 45 games and kicked 72 goals during his time at Williamstown.

== See also ==
- 1914 Sydney Carnival
