= Darcy McDougall =

Australian rules footballer

Personal information
- Full name: D'Arcy Vincent McDougall
- Nickname: Doug
- Born: 16 April 1886; Clifton Hill, Victoria
- Died: 7 April 1952 (aged 65); Petersham, New South Wales
- Original team: All Saints
- Height: 177 cm (5 ft 10 in)
- Weight: 72 kg (159 lb)

Playing career^{1}
Years	Club	Games (Goals)
1904	Collingwood	1 (0)
1907–1909	South Adelaide	33 (1)
1910–1915	Sturt	74 (0)
- ^{1} Playing statistics correct to the end of 1904.

Darcy Vincent McDougall (16 April 1886 – 7 April 1952) was an Australian rules footballer who played with Collingwood in the Victorian Football League (VFL).
