= Pen Reynolds =

Australian rules footballer

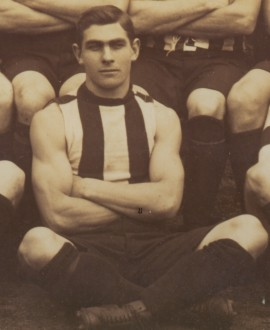
- Reynolds in 1914

Personal information
- Full name: Alfred Pendarves Reynolds
- Born: 4 May 1892; Fairfield, Victoria
- Died: 24 November 1979 (aged 87); Fairfield, Victoria
- Original team: Alphington
- Height: 173 cm (5 ft 8 in)
- Weight: 76 kg (168 lb)

Playing career^{1}
| Years | Club | Games (Goals) |
| 1913–1919 | Collingwood | 87 (16) |
- ^{1} Playing statistics correct to the end of 1919.

Alfred Pendarves 'Pen' Reynolds (4 May 1892 – 24 November 1979) was an Australian rules footballer who played for Collingwood in the VFL during the 1910s.

Pen Reynolds, who attended Wesley College, was mainly a follower but could also play as a defender and in attack. He appeared in a total of four VFL Grand Finals, winning the 1917 and 1919 premiership deciders. The 1919 Grand Final win was his last game in the league.
