= John Robertson (Australian footballer, born 1892) =

Australian rules footballer

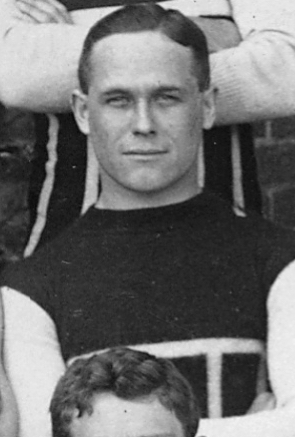

Personal information
- Full name: John William Robertson
- Born: 15 July 1892; Semaphore South, South Australia
- Died: 8 September 1982 (aged 90); Plenty, Victoria
- Height: 175 cm (5 ft 9 in)
- Weight: 77 kg (170 lb)
- Position: Centre half-back

Playing career
Years	Club	Games (Goals)
1912–1915	Port Adelaide	59
1919–1920	Port Adelaide	3
Total		62

Representative team honours
Years	Team	Games (Goals)
1914	South Australia	5

Career highlights
- Referee Newspaper Medal – South Australia's best player (1914); 2× Championship of Australia (1913, 1914); 2× Port Adelaide premiership player (1913, 1914); Port Adelaide captain (1920)

John William Robertson (15 July 1892 – 8 September 1982) was an Australian rules football player for Port Adelaide. His career was cut short due to World War I and the injuries obtained in the conflict.

== Family ==
The son of John George Robertson (1868-), and Elizabeth Lucy Robertson (1865-1940), née Tuttle, John William Robertson was born in Semaphore South, South Australia on 15 July 1892.

He married Ruby Mary Emily Kelsey (1895-1975) in 1919. They had one child: a daughter, Joan Mary Robertson (born 1921).

== Football ==
=== Port Adelaide (SAFL) ===
Robertson made his South Australian National Football League (SANFL) senior debut for Port Adelaide Football Club in 1912.

=== Interstate football ===
He quickly became a leading player in South Australia and was chosen for the South Australian squad for the 1914 ANFC Carnival, held in Sydney.

The best player from each state in the carnival was awarded a gold medal — known as the Referee Medal (after the sporting newspaper The Referee — and Robertson was awarded the South Australian gold medal.

== Military service ==
He enlisted in the First AIF, and served overseas in France during World War One; and was wounded in action. He returned to Australia on the S.S. Swakopmund on 29 July 1919.

== Death ==
He died at his residence at Plenty, Victoria on 8 September 1982.

== See also ==
- 1914 Sydney Carnival
- 1916 Pioneer Exhibition Game
