= 1911 Adelaide Carnival =

Tournament details
- Country: Australia
- City: Adelaide
- Dates: 2–11 August 1911
- Format: Round-robin
- Teams: 5

Final positions
- Champions: South Australia

The 1911 Adelaide Carnival was the second edition of the Australasian Football Carnival, an Australian football interstate competition. It took place from 2 to 12 August at Adelaide Oval.

A crowd of 20,000 witnessed South Australia convincingly defeat Victoria in the final to win the championship.

== Organisation ==
Home state South Australia was joined by teams representing Victoria, Western Australia, Tasmania and New South Wales. Two teams which had competed in the 1908 Melbourne Carnival – Queensland and New Zealand – did not send teams in 1911.

The five teams competed in a single division, each playing the others once. The state with the best record from those games would win the tournament; or, if two teams shared the best record, a final would have been staged. All games were played at Adelaide Oval.

The carnival made a small profit, taking £1,100 at the gate across six days of play, compared with the visiting teams' expenses of £1,025.

== Squads ==
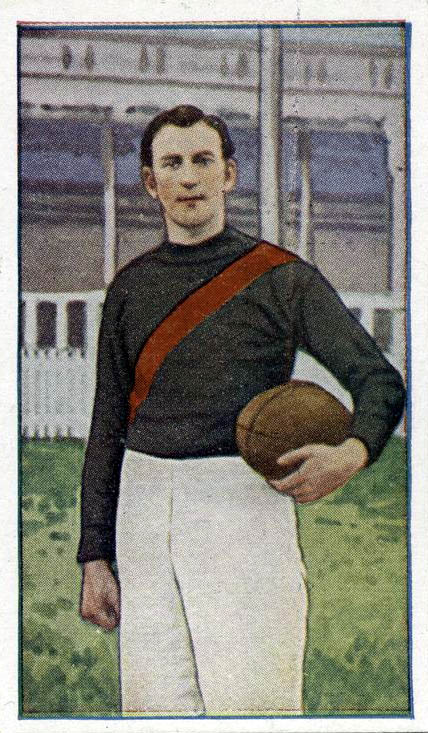
Fred Baring

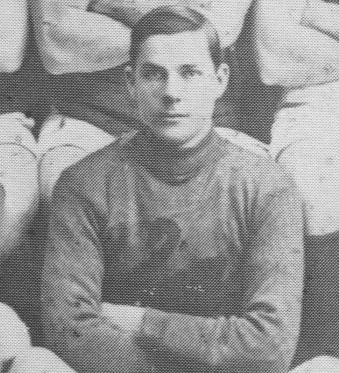
Charles Doig

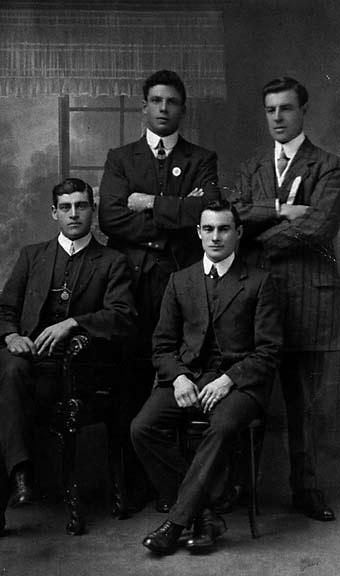
Port Adelaide's 1911 State Representatives: Angelo Congear, Harold Oliver, Sampson Hosking and Frank Hansen.

=== Victoria ===
Victoria Carnival Squad
Manager: T. Fleming Cooke
Carlton: T. A. Clancy, V. S. Gardiner, E. Jamieson, V. G. Valentine, J. Wells

Collingwood: W. H. Lee, J. F. McHale (vice-capt.), E. M. Rowell, J. M. Sadler, J. Sharp
Essendon: F. A. Baring, A. Belcher, E. J. Cameron, D. Smith
Fitzroy: J. Cooper, G. Holden
Geelong: W. Eason (capt.), R. R. Grigg, G. V. Heinz
Richmond: B. V. Herbert, L. Incigneri
St Kilda: R.B. Pierce
University: G. S. Elliott, D. Greenham.

Sharp was not selected in the original squad, but was called up due to injuries and absences in the primary squad. Sharp was in Adelaide because Collingwood and North Adelaide played an exhibition match during the week of the carnival.

=== Western Australia ===
Western Australian Carnival Squad

Boulder City: J. Baker, H. Denton, H. Gavin, R. Hebbard, T. Puddy

East Fremantle: W. Craig, C. Doig, E. Riley, A. Strang
North Fremantle: P. Matson, G. Toohey
Mines Rovers: A. Daykin, W. Mayman, W. Truscott
Perth: W.D. Moffat, C. Waugh, T. R. Willoughby
Railways: A. J. Aldridge, W. Smith, G. Tyson
South Fremantle: E. Ralston
Warriors: W. Tremberth
West Perth: G. Balme, G. Barnes.

The Western Australian chose its squad from an even split of twelve players from the West Australian Football League and twelve players from the Goldfields Football League.

=== South Australia ===
South Australian Carnival Squad
Managers: J. Hodge (Port Adelaide), A. C. Thomas (Sturt)
North Adelaide: E. Johns, T. Leahy

Norwood: L. A. Lewis, P. Robin
Port Adelaide: A. Congear, F. J. Hansen, S. Hosking, H. W. Oliver
South Adelaide: A. Job, E. Jones, J. J. Treadrea (vice-capt.)
Sturt: H. V. Cumberland, E. L. Renfrey (capt.)
West Adelaide: A. Conlin, W. Dowling, G. Oakley, H. R. Read
West Torrens: S. D. Geddes, D. Low, A. Taylor.

=== Tasmania ===
Tasmanian Carnival Squad

TFL (Hobart): E. Absolom, R. Bailey, T. Bastick, L. Bennison, C. Bryan, T. Carroll, C. Dunn, C. Edwards, J. Gardiner (capt.), H. Hay, P. Jory, H. Kelly, G. Morrissey, J. Mulross, J. Pennicott, B. Reardon, H. Reid, E. Russell, E.J. Tudor.

NTFA (Launceston): G. Challis, R.H.P. Hutchinson, M. S. McKenzie, A. D. Tynan, H. Webster.

=== New South Wales ===
New South Wales Carnival Squad
Manager: E.W. Butler
Broken Hill: J. Lord

East Sydney: J. Ashley, H. Welsh
Newtown: J. Dawson, H.P. Hortin, A. Provan
North Broken Hill: A. Beck, J. Incoll, A. Matheson, R. Monroe, A. Pincombe
North Shore: R. Robertson (capt.), H. Teague
Paddington: F. Beaver, G. Parr
South Broken Hill: C. Zeugofsge
Sydney: J. Lynch, F.R. McCargill , W. Muggivan, R. Pascoe, A. Vincent (vice-capt.)
West Broken Hill: J. Yuill
Y.M.C.A.: T. Dickson, R. Ellis, P. McCann, A. Rial.

The New South Wales squad comprised seventeen players from Sydney and eight players from Broken Hill.

== Results ==
=== Matches ===
==== Saturday 2 August ====
	Day 1
Wednesday, 2 August (2:45pm)	Victoria 13.18 (96)	def.	New South Wales 11.6 (72)	Adelaide Oval (crowd: 4,000)

==== Saturday 5 August ====
	Day 2
Saturday, 5 August (1:15pm)	Victoria 8.22 (70)	def.	Tasmania 6.3 (39)	Adelaide Oval (crowd: 18,000 (C-R))
Saturday, 5 August (3:15pm)	South Australia 13.18 (96)	def.	Western Australia 3.5 (23)	Adelaide Oval (crowd: 18,000)

==== Monday 7 August ====
	Day 3
Monday, 7 August (1:15pm)	Western Australia 9.13 (67)	def.	New South Wales 8.18 (66)	Adelaide Oval (crowd: 2,500 (C-R))
Monday, 7 August (3:15pm)	South Australia 13.13 (91)	def.	Tasmania 3.6 (24)	Adelaide Oval (crowd: 2,500)

==== Wednesday 9 August ====
	Day 4
Wednesday, 9 August (1:15pm)	South Australia 12.20 (92)	def.	New South Wales 2.9 (21)	Adelaide Oval (crowd: 3,000 (C-R))
Wednesday, 9 August (3:00pm)	Victoria 10.15 (75)	def.	Western Australia 8.9 (57)	Adelaide Oval (crowd: 3,000)

==== Thursday 10 August ====
	Day 5
Thursday, 10 August (3:00pm)	Tasmania 15.11 (101)	def.	New South Wales 3.9 (27)	Adelaide Oval (crowd: 300)

==== Saturday 12 August ====
	Day 6
Saturday, 12 August (1:00pm)	Tasmania 8.14 (62)	def.	Western Australia 8.9 (57)	Adelaide Oval (crowd: 20,000 (C-R))
Saturday, 12 August (3:00pm)	South Australia 11.11 (77)	def.	Victoria 5.4 (34)	Adelaide Oval (crowd: 20,000)

=== Ladder ===
1911 Adelaide Carnival ladder
Pos	Team	Pld	W	L	D	PF	PA	Pts
1	South Australia	4	4	0	0	356	102	8
2	Victoria	4	3	1	0	275	245	6
3	Tasmania	4	2	2	0	225	245	4
4	Western Australia	4	1	3	0	204	299	2
5	New South Wales	4	0	4	0	186	356	0
