= George Challis (Australian rules footballer) =

Australian rules footballer

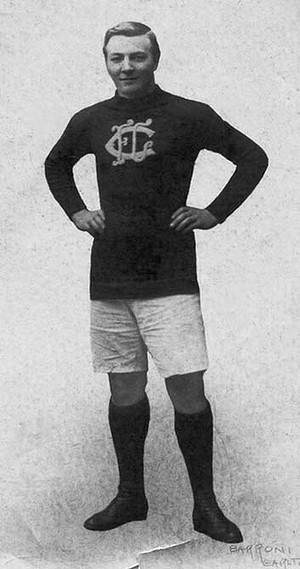
- Challis during his Carlton career

Personal information
- Full name: George David Challis
- Born: 9 February 1891; Cleveland, Tasmania
- Died: 15 July 1916 (aged 25); Armentières, France
- Original team: Launceston
- Height: 177 cm (5 ft 10 in)
- Weight: 79 kg (174 lb)
- Position: Wingman

Playing career^{1}
Years	Club	Games (Goals)
1912–15	Carlton	70 (16)
- ^{1} Playing statistics correct to the end of 1915.

George David Challis (9 February 1891 – 15 July 1916) was an Australian rules footballer who played for Carlton in the Victorian Football League (VFL) during the early 1910s.

== Family ==
The son of Michael Charles Challis (1865–1928), and Margaret Challis (1868–1943), née McGregor, George David Challis was born at Cleveland in the Northern Midlands of Tasmania on 9 February 1891.

He is the great-great-uncle of Levi Casboult.

== Education ==
He attended Launceston Church Grammar School.

== Football ==
Challis was a Tasmanian and started his career at Launceston, where he was a premiership player in 1909 and regular NTFA representative at the State Championships. He also represented Tasmania at the 1911 Adelaide Carnival, participating in their famous win over Western Australia. During this time he played mainly as a half forward or rover but when he was lured to Carlton in 1912 he soon established himself as a wingman. It was in that position that he starred in Carlton's 1915 premiership team.

He almost missed out on the chance to win a premiership as he had attempted to join the army at the beginning of the season, only to be refused because his toes overlapped.

== Hall of Fame ==
The Tasmanian Football Hall of Fame was established in 2005; and among all of those who had played football in Tasmania over more than a century, Challis was one of the 130 former players chosen to be in the initial list of inductees.

== Military service ==
A teacher by profession, and a committed Esperantist, he was eventually signed up and served with the 58th Infantry Battalion on the Western Front.

== Death ==
Challis, by then a Sergeant, was killed in action, on 15 July 1916, when a heavy-calibre German artillery shell dropped into his trench in Armentières, France.

He is buried at the Rue-du-Bois Military Cemetery, in Pétillon, near Fleurbaix, in France.

== See also ==
- List of Victorian Football League players who died on active service
- 1911 Adelaide Carnival
