= Algy Millhouse =

Australian rules footballer (1887–1948)

Personal information
- Full name: Algernon Edward Millhouse
- Born: 13 May 1887; Mount Gambier, South Australia
- Died: 1 October 1948 (aged 61); Richmond, Victoria
- Original team: West Broken Hill
- Height: 173 cm (5 ft 8 in)
- Weight: 79 kg (174 lb)
- Position: Rover

Playing career^{1}
Years	Club	Games (Goals)
1911–1912, 1914	Norwood	27 (14)
1913	Melbourne	10 (4)
1913	St Kilda	10 (5)

Coaching career^{3}
Years	Club	Games (W–L–D)
1914	Norwood	12 (4–8–0)
- ^{1} Playing statistics correct to the end of 1914.^{3} Coaching statistics correct as of 1914.

Algernon Edward Millhouse (13 May 1887 – 1 October 1948) was an Australian rules footballer who played for the Melbourne Football Club and St Kilda Football Club in the Victorian Football League (VFL). He also played for the Norwood Football Club in the South Australian Football League (SAFL). He was captain-coach of Norwood for the 1914 season.

== Family ==
The son of Joseph Edward Millhouse (1860-1920), and Mary Jane Millhouse (1862-1944), née Mahood, Algernon Edward Millhouse was born in Mount Gambier, South Australia on 13 May 1887.

He married Muriel Elizabeth Cheek (1887-1947), in Adelaide, on 14 May 1912. An accomplished soprano, she was always known professionally (at the Melbourne University Conservatorium, Melbourne Harmonic Society, etc.) as Miss Muriel Cheek.

Millhouse died in Richmond on 1 October 1948.

== Football ==
=== Port Pirie (South Australia) ===
In Port Pirie, he played football for the Port Pirie Rovers.

=== Broken Hill (New South Wales) ===
He played for the West Broken Hill Football Club, until he was transferred with his employment to Adelaide in February 1911.

- 1908: Represented New South Wales at the Jubilee Australasian Football Carnival.
- 1910: captain of the West Broken Hill team.
- 1910: captain of the combined Broken Hill team that played against a combined Ballarat League team.

=== Melbourne (VFL) ===
In 1913, having transferred to Melbourne with his employment, and having been sought by both Carlton and St Kilda, he was granted a clearance from Norwood to Melbourne in April 1913: "the [Melbourne] club has a prize in Millhouse, the great South Australian all-round athlete, whose particular forte is football".

He played ten senior matches with Melbourne before transferring, mid-season, to St Kilda. His last match was against Collingwood in round 10).

=== St Kilda (VFL) ===
Midway through the 1913 season, Millhouse was granted a clearance to St Kilda, and played his first match for St Kilda in round 12 against University. His form improved significantly with his move to St Kilda, and he played in ten consecutive senior matches for St Kilda, including the losing Grand Final team, against Fitzroy on 27 September 1913.

== Military service ==
He enlisted in the First AIF in August 1915. Having served overseas, he returned to Australia on 28 August 1919 in the TSS Kanowna, and was discharged not long after that.

== See also ==
- 1908 Melbourne Carnival
