= Alf Baud =

Australian rules footballer

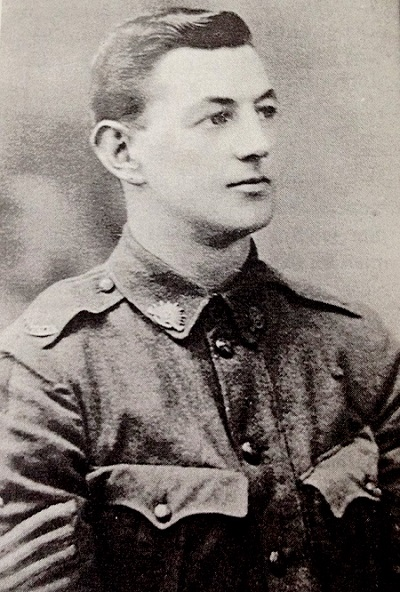
- Baud in 1917

Personal information
- Full name: Alfred Miller Baud
- Born: 20 September 1892; Nagambie, Victoria
- Died: 5 December 1986 (aged 94); Heidelberg West, Victoria
- Original teams: Nagambie, Eaglehawk (BFL)
- Height: 178 cm (5 ft 10 in)
- Weight: 74 kg (163 lb)
- Position: Half forward / Half back

Playing career^{1}
Years	Club	Games (Goals)
1913–1915	Carlton	53 (16)

Representative team honours
Years	Team	Games (Goals)
1913–1914	Victoria	? (?)
- ^{1} Playing statistics correct to the end of 1915.

Career highlights
- Carlton premiership player 1914, 1915; Carlton premiership captain 1915

Alfred Miller Baud (20 September 1892 – 5 December 1986) was an Australian rules footballer who played with Carlton in the Victorian Football League (VFL).

== Family ==
Baud was born in Nagambie on 20 September 1892.

He was married twice: to Clara Evelyn Thomson (1894–1940) in 1920, and to Margery Waterstrom (1913–2002) in 1960.

== Employment ==
He went to school at Nagambie; and, after leaving school, he went to Bendigo for his first job in the Post Office, and later moved to Melbourne. After the war he resumed work with the Post Office, and served for 50 years as a telegraphist and postmaster including long terms at the Ascot Vale and North Melbourne Post Offices.

== Football ==
A Football Sensation
Another great Carlton player was Alf Baud. He could play anywhere. The younger generation are proud to speak of the amazing balance of Haydn Bunton. I think that Baud, by comparison, would have made Bunton look ordinary. Baud would have been a football sensation had it not been for the war. That finished his career. His war injuries were severe.
You would have stopped Baud one minute, or should I say you thought you had stopped him; then in a flash he was past you. He was a thinker. Every counter you met him with was in turn countered by this most elusive footballer. Baud was one of the greatest players we have produced. I don't think he ever reached his top. — Roy Cazaly, 5 June 1937.

=== Nagambie ===
Baud originally played with Nagambie, prior to signing with Eaglehawk Football Club in 1911.

=== Carlton (VFL) ===
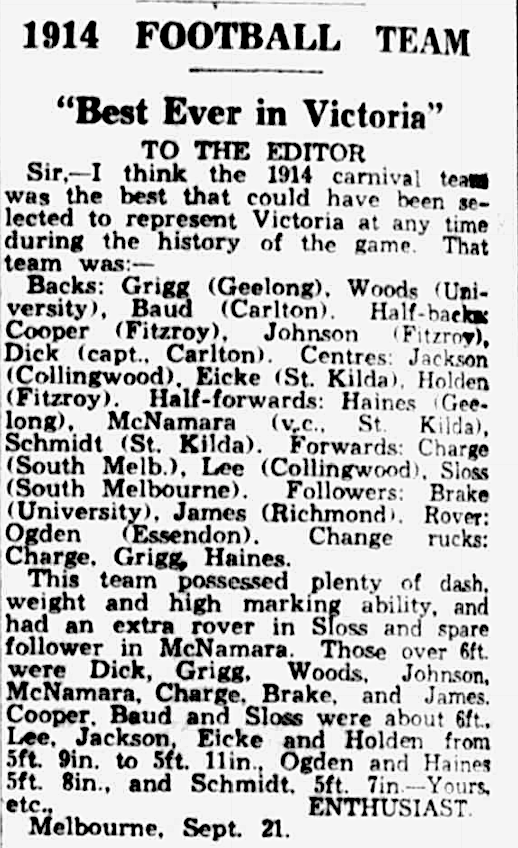
Enthusiast's Letter to the Editor The Herald, 21 September 1934.

Baud first played with Carlton with 1913; and, during his three-season career, was a member of two premiership sides. The first came in 1914 when he played on the wing in the club's Grand Final victory and the other came the following season. Selected on the half-back flank, he was Carlton's captain in the 1915 VFL grand final, replacing the suspended Billy Dick.

== Military service ==
On 31 July 1915, he enlisted in the First AIF, and served with the 5th Division as a signaller. After serving in Egypt and France, he was seriously wounded with a shrapnel injury to the head at Anzac Ridge on 30 September 1917, leaving him with reduced sight. The surgeons put a silver plate in his head that stayed in place for the remainder of his life. He was repatriated to Australia in 1918.

Baud's war service and injury is mentioned in sports journalist Martin Flanagan's 2003 collection of essays The Game in Time of War.

== Carlton selector ==
In 1937 he served as chairman of selectors for Carlton Football Club, and they won their first VFL Premiership since 1915.

== VFL Tribunal ==
His interest with football continued with Baud spending 19 years on the VFL tribunal.

== Death ==
He died at the Heidelberg Repatriation Hospital, Heidelberg, Victoria, on 5 December 1986.
