= Paddy Gilchrist =

Australian rules footballer

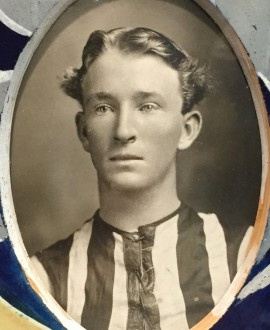
- Gilchrist in 1910

Personal information
- Full name: Patrick Gilchrist
- Born: 10 November 1889; Richmond, Victoria
- Died: 7 August 1970 (aged 80); Heidelberg, Victoria
- Original team: Mitcham
- Debut: Round 13, 23 July 1910, Collingwood vs. Essendon, at Victoria Park

Playing career^{1}
Years	Club	Games (Goals)
1910–1913	Collingwood	37 (31)
- ^{1} Playing statistics correct to the end of 1913.

Career highlights
- 1910 premiership team

Paddy Gilchrist (10 November 1889 – 7 August 1970) was an Australian rules footballer who played for Collingwood in the Victorian Football League (VFL).

Gilchrist played as the ruckman in 37 games over four years with Collingwood, including the 1910 Grand Final win over Carlton. Gilchrist won a premiership in his first season in the VFL.

Gilchrist played only one game in his last season in the VFL, a win against Melbourne in round one, 1913.
