= Jack Londrigan =

Australian rules footballer

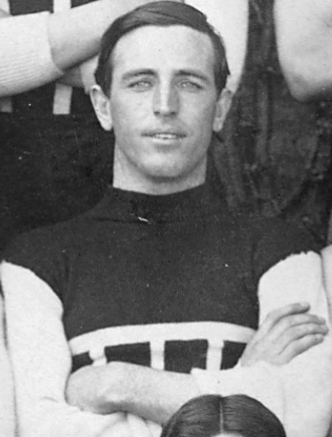

Personal information
- Full name: John William Londrigan
- Nickname: Jack
- Born: 3 February 1890; Goodwood, South Australia
- Died: 22 August 1937 (aged 47); North Adelaide, South Australia
- Original team: Christian Brothers College
- Position: Defender

Playing career^{1}
Years	Club	Games (Goals)
1907–1910	Sturt	46 (0)
1911	Adelaide University (SAAFL)	? (?)
1912–1914	Port Adelaide	42 (0)
Total		88 (0)

Representative team honours
Years	Team	Games (Goals)
	South Australia	1
- ^{1} Playing statistics correct to the end of 1910.

Career highlights
- 2× Champions of Australia player (1913, 1914); 2× Port Adelaide premiership player (1913, 1914); Port Adelaide club captain (1913, 1914)

John William Londrigan (3 February 1890 – 22 August 1937) was an Australian rules football player from South Australia.

== Sturt (1907–1910) ==
Initially Londrigan played for Sturt but after strong rumours that University would soon be admitted to the SAFL, thereby eliminating the bye, he left the club.

== Adelaide University (1911) ==
However, after it became apparent that University would not be admitted to the SAFL he left to join Port Adelaide in 1912.

== Port Adelaide (1912–1914) ==
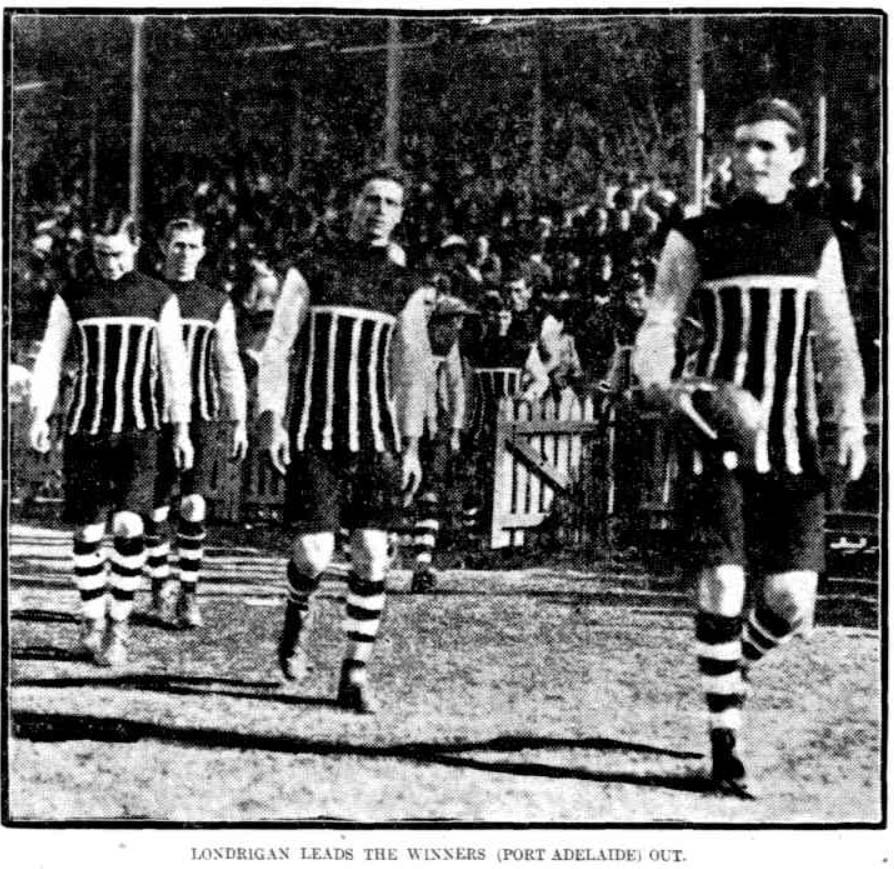
John Londrigan leads Port Adelaide out onto Adelaide Oval for the first game of the club's 1914 season.

Impressing in his first year he was appointed captain in 1912. Subsequently, he was captain of the 1913 and 1914 Port Adelaide side who were one of the sport's greatest ever teams. He is the only player to twice captain victorious Champions of Australia teams. His career ended with the onset of World War I.
