= Frank Magor =

Australian rules footballer

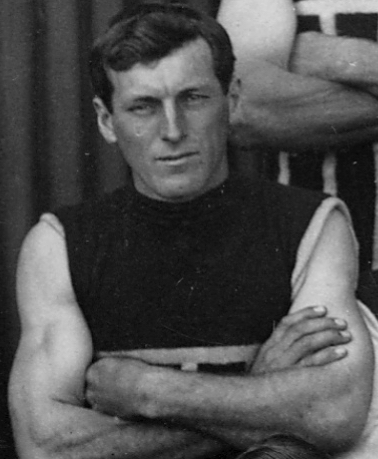

Personal information
- Full name: Francis James Magor
- Nickname: Sheeny
- Born: 28 June 1886; East Moonta, South Australia
- Died: 12 April 1951 (aged 64)

Playing career
Years	Club	Games (Goals)
1909–1915	Port Adelaide	87 (50)

Career highlights
- 2× SAFL premiership player (1910, 1914)

Francis James Magor (28 June 1886 – 12 April 1951) was an Australian rules footballer who played for the Port Adelaide Football Club in the South Australian Football League (SAFL).
