= Alex McFarlane =

Australian rules footballer (1887–1952)

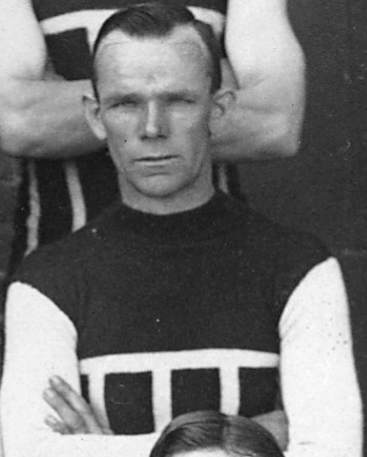

Personal information
- Full name: Thomas Alexander Hugh McFarlane
- Nickname: Bandy
- Born: 2 May 1887; Semaphore, South Australia
- Died: 1 November 1952 (aged 65); Alice Springs, Northern Territory
- Weight: 76 kg (168 lb)

Playing career^{1}
Years	Club	Games (Goals)
1909–1915, 1919	Port Adelaide	100 (28)

Representative team honours
Years	Team	Games (Goals)
1914	South Australia	5

Coaching career
Years	Club	Games (W–L–D)
1915	Port Adelaide	14 (9-4-1) 64.29%
- ^{1} Playing statistics correct to the end of 1919.

Career highlights
- Club: 3× SAFA premiership player (1910, 1913, 1914); 3× Champion of Australia (1910, 1913, 1914); Port Adelaide captain (1915, 1919); Honours: Port Adelaide life member (1929)

Thomas Alexander Hugh McFarlane (2 May 1887 – 1 November 1952) was an Australian rules footballer who played for Port Adelaide.

== Football ==
McFarlane debuted for Port Adelaide during the 1909 SAFL season. He would captain the club in the South Australian Football League seasons immediately before and after World War I.

== Personal life ==
McFarlane was the 15th child of Alexander Macfarlane, an immigrant from Scotland, and Mary Ann Tyzack who was born in Port Adelaide.

His uncle, Samuel Tyzack, was a foundation player for Port Adelaide in 1870.

Alex was the uncle of Bill McFarlane who played over 100 games for Port Adelaide during the 1940s.

He married Olive May Hobbs on 18 December 1911 at St. Aiden’s Church, Marden South Australia.

Olive and Alex had seven children. Alexander Steer McFarlane 1913; Daphne May McFarlane (1914-1917); Ronald George McFarlane 1916; Olive Valerie McFarlane 1917; Harold McFarlane (1919-1921); Kenneth Malcom 1924; and Joan Louise McFarlane 1925.

== Death ==
Alex McFarlane died in Alice Springs on 1 November 1952.

== Reputation ==
Tom Leahy described him as being "Tremendously strong, played very fairly, but very hard. I was against him many times, and he was a tough man to beat."
