= George Bower (footballer) =

Australian rules footballer (1884–1964)

Personal information
- Full name: George Buxton Bower
- Born: 18 June 1884; South Melbourne, Victoria
- Died: 5 February 1964 (aged 79); Brighton, Victoria
- Original team: Leopold
- Height: 175 cm (5 ft 9 in)
- Weight: 75 kg (165 lb)

Playing career^{1}
Years	Club	Games (Goals)
1909–1914	South Melbourne	75 (11)
- ^{1} Playing statistics correct to the end of 1914.

Career highlights
- AIF Pioneer Exhibition Game, London, 28 October 1916

George Buxton Bower (18 June 1884 – 5 February 1964) was an Australian rules footballer who played with South Melbourne in the Victorian Football League (VFL).

== Family ==
His older brother, Harold Carlyle Bower (1878–1954) also played for South Melbourne.

== Football ==
=== South Melbourne (VFL) ===
Bower made his debut in round one, 1909, against Geelong, at Corio Oval on 1 May 1909.

He was a member of a premiership team in his very first season, playing as a centreman in the 1909 VFL Grand Final. In 1912, South Melbourne made another grand final, but Bower didn't play as he had received a four-week suspension in the semi-final, for striking Essendon's Fred Baring.

He played his last senior match, against Geelong, on 2 May 1914, in which he was one of the best on the ground.

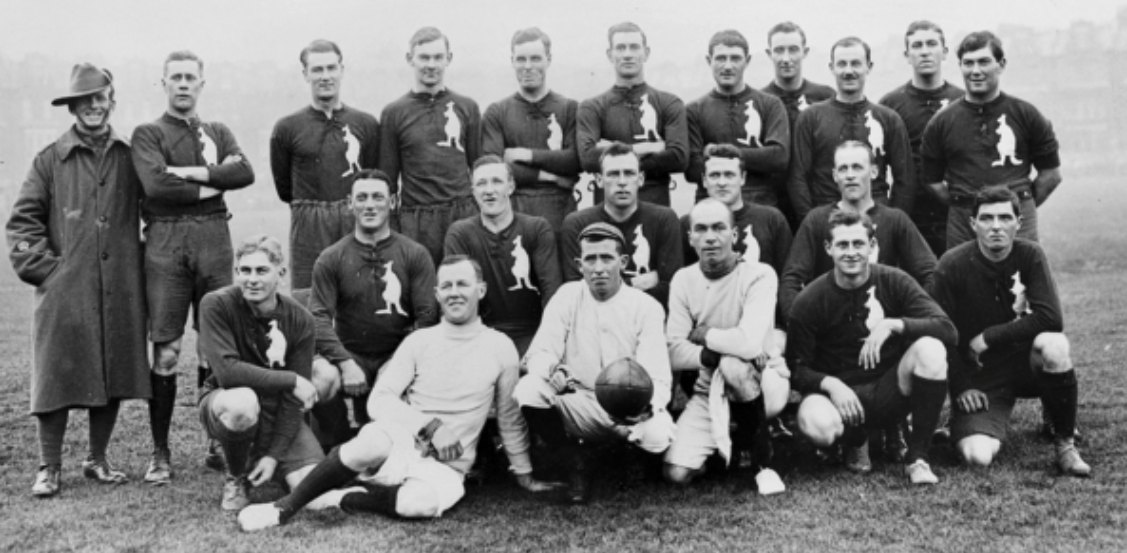
The Australian Training Units Team: 28 October 1916. George Bower is the player at extreme left of back row.

=== Training Units Team (AIF) ===
While serving overseas he played for the (losing) Australian Training Units team in the famous "Pioneer Exhibition Game" of Australian Rules football, held in London, in October 1916. A news film was taken at the match.

== Military service ==
Bower's career ended when he enlisted in the First AIF; he served overseas with the 13th Light Horse Regiment

== See also ==
- 1916 Pioneer Exhibition Game
