= Leo Little =

Australian rules footballer

Personal information
- Full name: Leopold Paul Little
- Born: 22 February 1892; Bacchus Marsh
- Died: 19 November 1956 (aged 64); Mercy Hospital, East Melbourne
- Original team: Port Melbourne

Playing career^{1}
Years	Club	Games (Goals)
1912–13	University	34 (20)
1919–20	Melbourne	12 (4)
Total		46 (24)
- ^{1} Playing statistics correct to the end of 1920.

Career highlights
- AIF Pioneer Exhibition Game, London, 28 October 1916

Leopold Paul Little (22 February 1892 – 19 November 1956) was an Australian rules footballer who played with Melbourne and University in the Victorian Football League (VFL).

== Family ==
The son of David Armstrong Little (1864-1926), and Annie Mary Little (1856-1944), née Hanigan, Leopold Paul Little was born at Bacchus Marsh on 22 February 1892.

He married Doris Speck (1899-1984) in 1920.

== Education ==
He was attended St Patrick's College, Ballarat as a boarder from 1906 to 1910; and, in January 1910, it was announced that (as "Leopold Francis Paul Little", No.1812) he had passed the Junior Public Examination.

In January 1910 he sat for the Commonwealth Public Service Examination for Appointment as a Clerk, Class 5, and (as "Leopold Francis Paul Little") was 18th of all the 600 candidates.

== Football ==
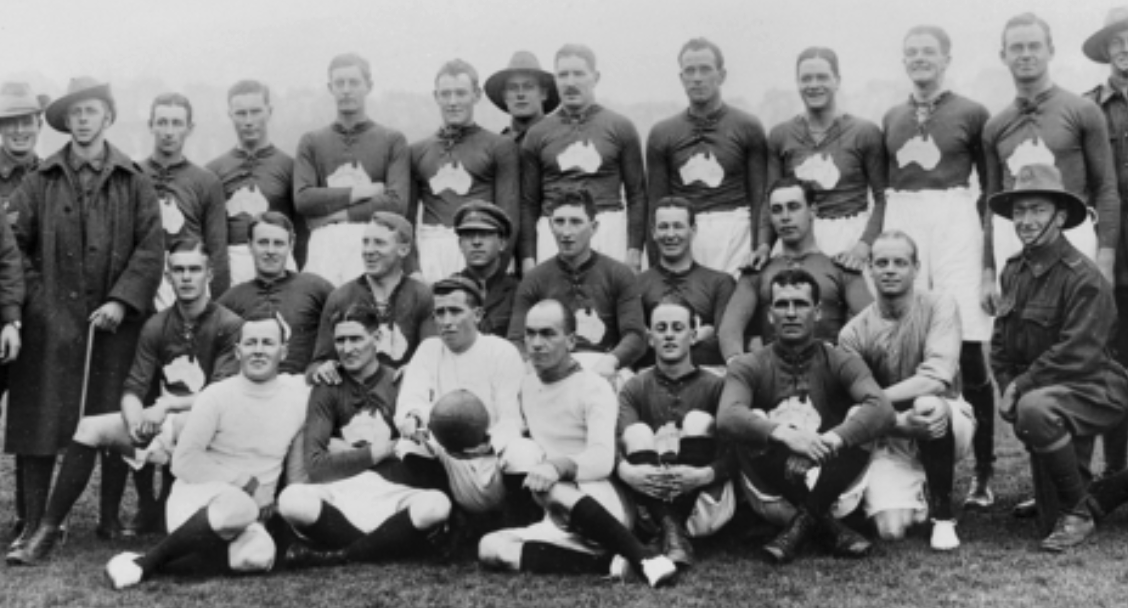
The Third Australian Divisional Team: 28 October 1916. Leo Little is the second player from right, back row.

He played for University in 1912 and 1913. In 1914, as a member of the Commonwealth Public Service, he moved to Canberra.

On 17 October 1914,

"L.P. Little, late of Melbourne University, and of football fame, won the 120 yards hurdle, the high jump, and the 440 yards championship of the territory (open to all comers)".

He was not linked with the Melbourne Football Club until 1919 (on his return to Australia from active service)

== Military service ==
He enlisted in the First AIF, as "Leo Paul Little", on 8 January 1916.

He played for the (winning) Third Australian national Divisional team in the famous "Pioneer Exhibition Game" of Australian Rules football, held in London, in October 1916. A news film was taken at the match.

He was wounded in action in 1917.

== Death ==
He died on 19 November 1956 at the Mercy Hospital, in East Melbourne.

== See also ==
- 1916 Pioneer Exhibition Game
