= Les Lee =

Australian rules footballer (1894–1917)

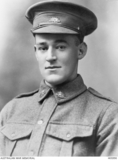

Personal information
- Full name: Edward Leslie Barnes Cooper, known as Leslie Edward Lee
- Born: 21 November 1894; Parkside, South Australia
- Died: 8 June 1917 (aged 22); Messines, Belgium

Playing career^{1}
Years	Club	Games (Goals)
1913	Richmond	2 (0)
- ^{1} Playing statistics correct to the end of 1913.

Career highlights
- AIF Pioneer Exhibition Game, London, 28 October 1916

Leslie Edward "Leggo" Lee (21 November 1894 – 8 June 1917) was an Australian rules footballer from South Australia who played with Richmond in the Victorian Football League (VFL) and with Williamstown in the Victorian Football Association (VFA).

He played in the famous services match in London, but was killed whilst serving in Belgium during World War I.

== Family ==
The son of Isabella Turner Barnes (1862-1948), later Mrs. Arthur James Roberts, Edward Leslie Barnes Cooper, known as Leslie Edward Lee, was born at Parkside, South Australia on 21 November 1894.

== Football ==
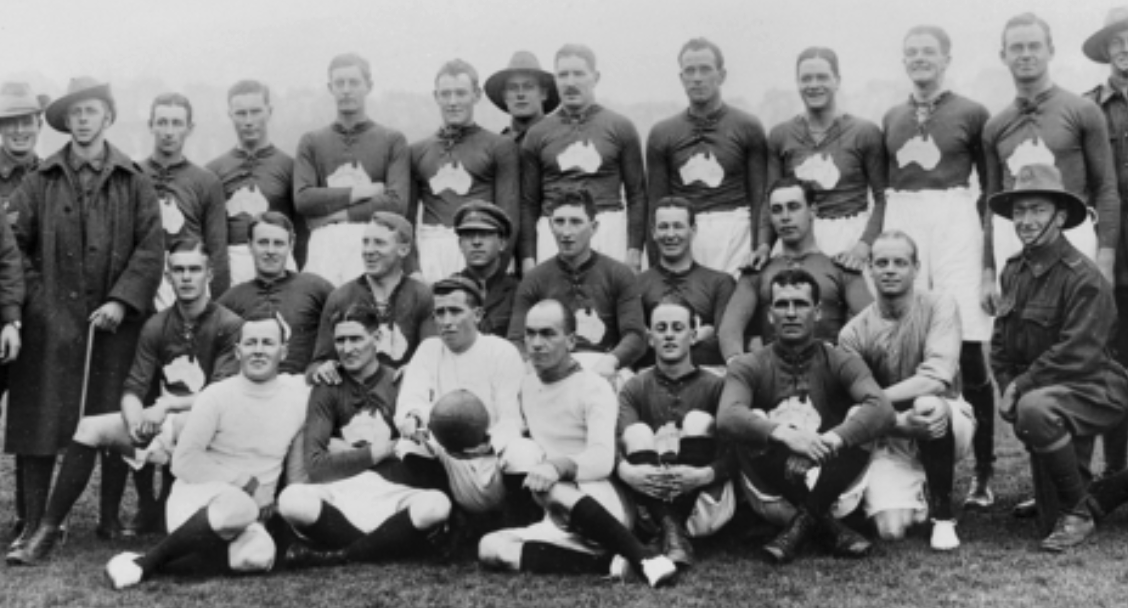
The Third Australian Divisional Team. Les Lee is the fourth player from the left in the back row.

=== Richmond (VFL) ===
At 18 years of age, he played for Richmond in the last two games of the 1913 season: against Melbourne on 23 August 1913, and against University on 30 August 1913.

=== Balmain (RDJFA) ===
In 1914 he played with the Balmain Football Club, one of the association's foundation clubs (in 1913), in the Richmond District Junior Football Association.

=== Williamstown (VFA) ===
Although he was training with Richmond in early May 1915, he was cleared from Richmond to Williamstown Football Club in the Victorian Football Association (VFA) on 12 May 1915, and played the first of his 12 matches with Williamstown, against Hawthorn on 15 May 1915. His last match was in the Second Semi-Final, against North Melbourne, on 31 July 1915.

=== "Pioneer Exhibition Game" (London, 28 October 1916) ===
On Saturday 28 October 1916, Lee participated in an Australian Rules football match – the "Pioneer Exhibition Game of Australian Football in London" – between two teams of Australian servicemen, the Australian Training Units and The Third Australian Divisional Team, conducted in aid of the British and French Red Cross, at Queen's Club, West Kensington. Lee played for the Third Australian Divisional Team, kicking one of the team's six goals.

Twenty years later, the team's vice-captain, the former Collingwood footballer, Dan Minogue, who would go on to play for, and captain, Richmond after the war, noting that Lee "marked magnificently", recalled that the comparatively unknown (having only played two VFL games, and only 21 years of age) Lee's performance in that game was outstanding:

"The star of that unforgettable match in London 21 years ago was young [Les] Lee. the unknown Richmond lad. He was only a boy, but he was of the Jack Dyer build and spirit. And could he play! He was a champion in the ruck that day of days. Unfortunately, he was killed in action later."

== Military service ==
Having undergone several operations to correct and straighten (otherwise excluding conditions) several toes and remove varicose veins, Lee enlisted in the First AIF and served overseas in the 10th Australian Machine Gun Company.

== Death ==
Originally reported wounded and missing in action, he was killed in action on 8 June 1917.

He has no known grave, and is commemorated at the Menin Gate Memorial to the Missing, in Ypres, Belgium.

== See also ==
- List of Victorian Football League players who died on active service
- 1916 Pioneer Exhibition Game

== Sources ==
- Hogan P: The Tigers of Old, Richmond FC, (Melbourne), 1996. ISBN 0-646-18748-1
- Holmesby, Russell & Main, Jim (2007). The Encyclopedia of AFL Footballers. 7th ed. Melbourne: Bas Publishing.
- Main, J. & Allen, D., "Lee, Leslie", pp. 101–105 in Main, J. & Allen, D., Fallen – The Ultimate Heroes: Footballers Who Never Returned From War, Crown Content, (Melbourne), 2002. ISBN 1-74095-010-0
- Richardson, Nick, The Game of Their Lives, Pan Macmillan, (Sydney), 2016. ISBN 978-1-7435-3666-7
- Australia's Roll of Honor: 384th Casualty List: Victoria: Killed in Action: "Lee, L. E., Richmond", The Age, (Tuesday, 26 February 1918), p.8.
- First World War Embarkation Roll: Private Leslie Edward Lee (224), collection of the Australian War Memorial.
- First World War Nominal Roll: Private Leslie Edward Lee (224), collection of the Australian War Memorial.
- First World War Service Record: Private Leslie Edward Lee (224), National Archives of Australia.
- Australian Red Cross Society Wounded and Missing Enquiry Bureau files, 1914-18 War: 1DRL/0428: 224 Private Leslie Edward Lee, collection of the Australian War Memorial.
- Private Leslie Edward Lee (224), Commonwealth War Graves Commission.
- Roll of Honour: Private Leslie Edward Lee (224), Australian War Memorial.
