= Stan Martin =

Australian rules footballer

Personal information
- Full name: Stanley Carlton Martin
- Born: 23 November 1889; Dunolly, Victoria
- Died: 3 May 1917 (aged 27); Bullecourt, France
- Original team: Wesley College
- Position: Wing

Playing career^{1}
Years	Club	Games (Goals)
1909–14	University	65 (4)
- ^{1} Playing statistics correct to the end of 1914.

Career highlights
- AIF Pioneer Exhibition Game, London, 28 October 1916

Stanley Carlton Martin (23 November 1889 – 3 May 1917) was an Australian rules footballer who played with the Melbourne University Football Club in the Victorian Football League.

== Family ==
The son of Irvine Martin and Mary Jane Martin, née Conron, he was born on 23 November 1889 at Dunolly, in Victoria. He was engaged to Olive Ruth Weaver in November 1915.

He was killed in action during his military service, at Bullecourt, France on 3 May 1917.

Mabel Alice Martin (1879–1953) was his sister, and Hector Martin (1877–1952) and Arthur Robert Martin (1883–1916) were his older brothers.

== Education ==
Educated at Wesley College, he began a dental degree at the University of Melbourne in 1910.

== Football ==
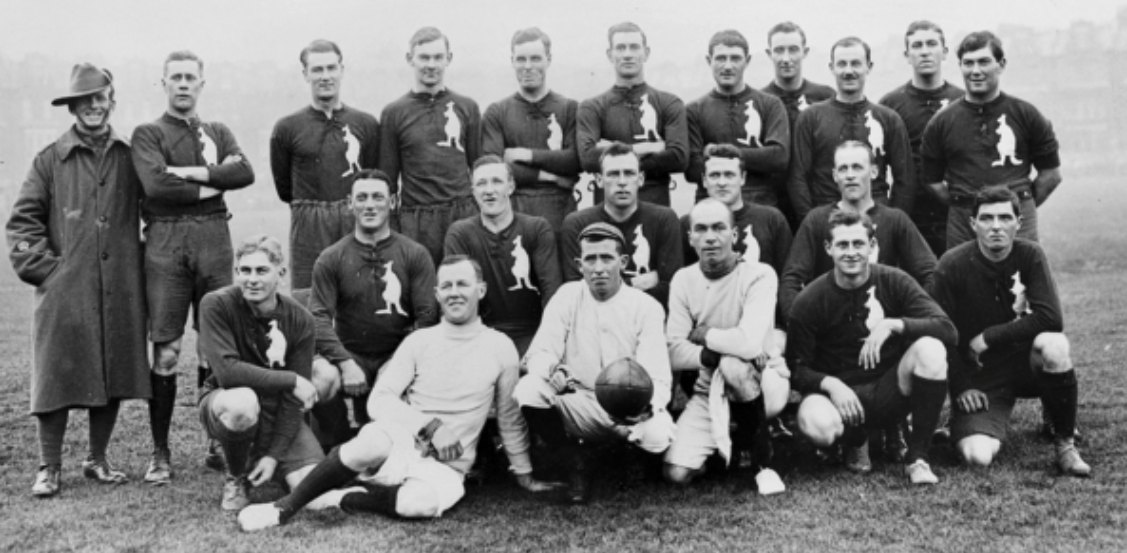
The Australian Training Units Team: 28 October 1916. Stan Martin is the third from the right in the back row.

=== University (VFL) ===
While at university he was awarded a full blue in football.

Stan Martin was for three or four years a noted wing player for the University Football Club, and was one of the finest exponents of the running drop-kick that I have ever seen. Being fast, quick and clever, he played many a great game for 'Varsity, and for his open, breezy exhibitions, was a prime favorite with the spectators. The sympathy of all players and lovers of the game is extended to his relatives. (Gerald Brosnan. The Winner, 30 May 1917).

=== Training Units team (AIF) ===
He played for the (losing) Australian Training Units team in the famous "Pioneer Exhibition Game" of Australian Rules football, held in London, in October 1916. A news film was taken at the match.

== Military ==
Having served in the cadets at Wesley College, he enlisted in the First AIF in July 1915. A bayonet instructor, he was killed in action.

== See also ==
- List of Victorian Football League players who died on active service
- 1916 Pioneer Exhibition Game
