= Ossy Armstrong =

Australian rules footballer (1892–1958)

Personal information
- Full name: Oswald Robert Armstrong
- Born: 30 May 1892; Geelong, Victoria
- Died: 1 March 1958 (aged 65); Breamlea, Victoria
- Original team: Barwon
- Height: 166 cm (5 ft 5 in)
- Weight: 73 kg (161 lb)

Playing career^{1}
Years	Club	Games (Goals)
1915	Geelong	5 (0)
- ^{1} Playing statistics correct to the end of 1915.

Career highlights
- AIF Pioneer Exhibition Game, London, 28 October 1916

Oswald Robert Armstrong (30 May 1892 – 1 March 1958) was an Australian rules footballer who played with Geelong in the Victorian Football League (VFL).

== Family ==
The son of Thomas Armstrong (1855-1910), and Elizabeth Jane Armstrong (1859-1946), née Spinks, Oswald Robert Armstrong was born at Geelong on 30 May 1892.

He married Mary Veronica Betts (1893-1964) in 1911.

== Football ==
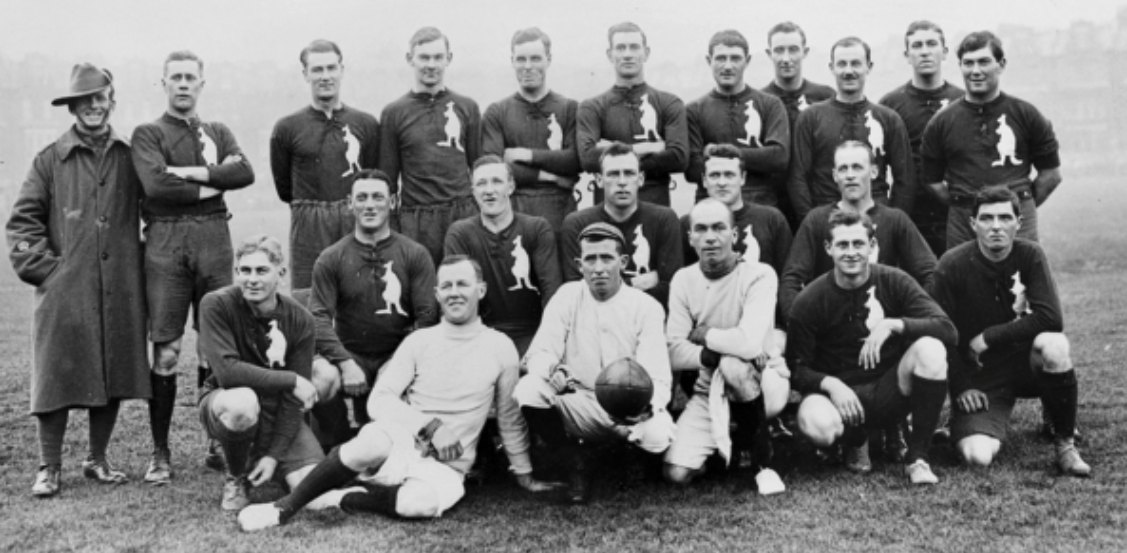
The Australian Training Units Team: 28 October 1916. Ossy Armstrong is the player at extreme right of back row.

=== Geelong (VFL) ===
Recruited from the Barwon Football Club, he played his first match for Geelong against St Kilda at the Junction Oval, on 3 July 1915. Overall, he played in five First XVIII games for Geelong, with his last game being that against Fitzroy, at the Brunswick Street Oval, on 21 August 1915, when Geelong was thrashed by Fitzroy, 18.13 (121) to 4.7 (31).

=== Training Units team (AIF) ===
He played for the (losing) Australian Training Units team in the famous "Pioneer Exhibition Game" of Australian Rules football, held in London, in October 1916. A news film was taken at the match.

=== Barwon Football Club ===
On his return from active overseas service with the First AIF, Geelong cleared Armstrong back to Barwon.

== Military service ==
He served overseas with the First AIF. He was captured by the Germans on 11 April 1917, and was a prisoner of war.

== Death ==
He died at Breamlea, Victoria on 1 March 1958.

== See also ==
- 1916 Pioneer Exhibition Game
