= Jack Watt (footballer, born 1890) =

Australian rules footballer

Personal information
- Full name: Jack Watt
- Born: 2 November 1890; Geelong
- Died: 19 December 1964 (aged 75); Brisbane
- Original team: Geelong College/East Geelong
- Height: 180 cm (5 ft 11 in)
- Weight: 80 kg (176 lb)
- Position: Follower

Playing career^{1}
Years	Club	Games (Goals)
1909, 1911–12	Geelong	31 (7)
1913–14	Melbourne	18 (7)
1914	St Kilda	5 (3)
Total		54 (17)
- ^{1} Playing statistics correct to the end of 1914.

John Watherston Watt (2 November 1890 – 19 December 1964) was an Australian rules footballer who played with Geelong, Melbourne and St Kilda in the Victorian Football League (VFL).

== See also ==
- 1916 Pioneer Exhibition Game
