= William Drummond (footballer) =

Australian rules footballer

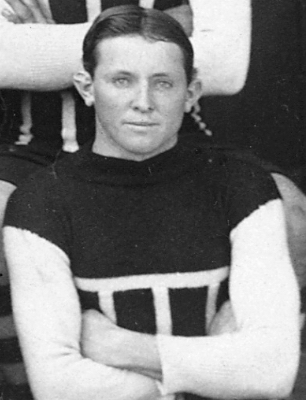

Personal information
- Full name: William Roy Sharp Drummond
- Nickname: Roy
- Born: 18 October 1890; Semaphore, South Australia
- Died: 15 December 1966 (aged 76); Largs Bay, South Australia
- Height: 164 cm (5 ft 5 in)
- Weight: 59 kg (130 lb)

Playing career
Years	Club	Games (Goals)
1913-1920	Port Adelaide	

Career highlights
- 2x Champion of Australia (1913, 1914); 2x Port Adelaide premiership player (1913, 1914)

William Roy Sharp Drummond (18 October 1890 – 15 December 1966), known as 'Roy', was an Australian rules footballer for the Port Adelaide Football Club.

== Family ==
The son of Andrew Drummond (1849–1926), and Nancy Jane Drummond (1853–1919), née Brookes, William Roy Sharp Drummond was born at Semaphore, South Australia on 18 October 1890.

He married Edith May Williams (1892–1949) on 18 August 1919.

He is the grandfather of Olympic basketballer Phil Smyth.

== Military Medal ==
William Drummond was awarded a Military Medal during World War I. He was awarded the medal for, as records state, taking '"control of his platoon (in battle at Hamel near Amiens on 7 July 1918) after almost all other non-commissioned officers were killed. He reorganised the platoon and led them to their objective that night. He also assisted with the wounded that night and showed great coolness and initiative throughout the operation."'

== Post Football ==
After returning from war William would spend time fishing off the Semaphore Jetty trying to catch fish to feed families struggling to obtain food.

== Death ==
He died at Largs Bay, South Australia on 15 December 1966.

== See also ==
- 1916 Pioneer Exhibition Game
