= Hugh Boyd (footballer) =

Australian rules footballer and dental surgeon

Personal information
- Full name: Hugh Julian Boyd
- Born: 24 April 1886; Bendigo
- Died: 8 August 1960 (aged 74); Sandringham, Victoria
- Original team: Caulfield Grammar

Playing career^{1}
Years	Club	Games (Goals)
1909	University	1 (2)
- ^{1} Playing statistics correct to the end of 1909.

Career highlights
- AIF Pioneer Exhibition Game, London, 28 October 1916

Hugh Julian Boyd MC (24 April 1886 – 8 August 1960) was a dental surgeon, and a former Australian rules footballer who played with University in the Victorian Football League (VFL). He served in the First AIF, and was awarded a Military Cross in 1917.

== Family ==
The son of Hugh Boyd, (1843-1916) M.D., and Julia Elizabeth Boyd (1855-1927), née Maddox, Hugh Julian Boyd was born in Bendigo on 24 April 1886. His brother, Erle Alwin Greglach Boyd (1892-1970) served in the Royal Australian Navy for 35 years.

He married Doris Norah Gosewinckel (1894-1952) on 8 August 1935. He died on 8 August 1960.

== Education ==
Educated at St. Andrew's College, Bendigo, at Caulfield Grammar School, and at the University of Melbourne. He commenced his dental surgery studies in 1905, and was awarded a Licentiate of Dental Surgery (LDS) in 1911. He graduated Bachelor of Dental Science (BDSc) in December 1928.

== Football ==
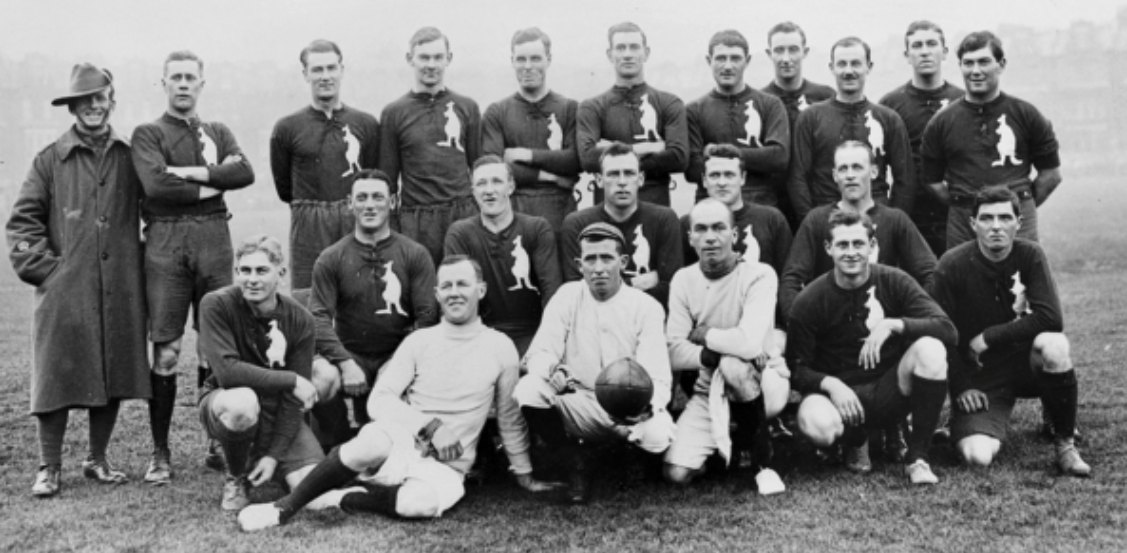
The Australian Training Units Team: 28 October 1916. Hugh Boyd is the fifth player from left, in middle row.

He played one match for the university team in the Victorian Football League (VFL) competition.

He played with the South Bendigo Football Club.

He also played for the Australian Training Units Team, in the famous "Pioneer Exhibition Game" of Australian Rules football, held in London, in October 1916 against the Third Australian Divisional Team. A news film was taken at the match.

== Military service ==
He enlisted in the First AIF in September 1915.

He was awarded a Military Cross (MC) in 1917:

At Polygon Wood on 25/9/17 this officer was in charge of "A" Coy the right company in the line. He was on the extreme right of the 15 Bde Sector. At 5:30 AM his line was heavily attacked by the enemy. By the vigorous resistance of his Coy the enemy was beaten back and the front line held intact. The enemy penetrated the front & support lines of the 1st Middlesex and enfiladed him by Machine Gun fire. This officer formed a defensive flank & foiled repeated attempts by the enemy to roll up his line. His personal work was magnificent & his courage inspired his men to hold out in a desperate situation. Had he failed to hold his line the success of the attack on the following morning would have been in jeopardy. It was largely owing to his celerity in appreciating the situation that the Brigade front was held intact. (29 September 1917)

== See also ==
- List of Caulfield Grammar School people
- 1916 Pioneer Exhibition Game
