= Les Turner (footballer) =

Australian rules footballer

Personal information
- Full name: Leslie Charles Turner
- Born: 6 March 1891; South Melbourne, Victoria
- Died: 2 October 1971 (aged 80); Brunswick, Victoria
- Original team: Prahran

Playing career^{1}
Years	Club	Games (Goals)
1915	South Melbourne	1 (1)
- ^{1} Playing statistics correct to the end of 1915.

Leslie Charles Turner (6 March 1891 – 2 October 1971) was an Australian rules footballer who played with South Melbourne in the Victorian Football League (VFL).

== Family ==
The son of Albert Turner (1865–1928), and Emmeline Turner, née McGill, Leslie Charles Turner was born at South Melbourne on 6 March 1891.

He married Jean Tayne (1892–1974) in 1921.

== Football ==
He played football for Essendon and Prahran in the VFA, and South Melbourne in the VFL. In 1921 he was captain of the Leopold Football Club.

== Military service ==
He served overseas with the First AIF.

== Death ==
He died at Brunswick, Victoria on 2 October 1971.

== See also ==
- 1916 Pioneer Exhibition Game
