= C. A. Keatinge Johnson =

Australian senior air force officer

Clarence Arnold Keatinge Johnson
- Born: 1870
- Died: 1937 (aged 66–67)
- Military career
- Allegiance: United Kingdom
- Branch: British Army; British India
- Rank: Lieutenant-Colonel
- Commands: Australian Overseas Base in Egypt, World War I Assistant Adjutant-General
- Conflicts: Black Mountain Expedition (1891); Boxer Rebellion; World War I

Lieutenant-Colonel Clarence Arnold Keatinge Johnson (1870–1937) was a senior officer in the First Australian Imperial Force. He was second in command of the 4th Light Horse, AIF, and part of the contingent in the 1st Expeditionary Force to Egypt. Keatinge Johnson later commanded the Australian Overseas base in Egypt, was Assistant Adjutant-General in England and in the final stage of his military career was cable censor at the British Military Intelligence Department.

== Family ==
Clarence Arnold Keatinge Johnson was born in England in 1870 and educated at Bedford Modern School.

In 1902 he married an Australian, Marjorie (née Brodribb), at St George's Hanover Square Church, London. According to his obituary in The Times, he was a sportsman who enjoyed big game hunting in the Himalayas and also a keen fisherman who caught big game fish in New Zealand and Queensland. Keatinge Johnson died in London in 1937. He was survived by his widow, a son and a daughter.

== Military career ==
In 1889 Keatinge Johnson was commissioned into the Royal Welsh Fusiliers at Lucknow and saw service with them in the Black Mountain Expedition of 1891. In August 1892 he left the Welsh Fusiliers to join the 1st Bengal Lancers (Skinner's Horse) and served in China during the Boxer Rebellion. Having been promoted Major in 1907, he was forced to retire in 1912 on the grounds of ill health and moved to Australia with his Australian wife.

At the outbreak of World War I, Keatinge Johnson offered his service to the Commonwealth Government and was made second in command of the 4th Light Horse, AIF, which was part of the contingent in the 1st Expeditionary Force to Egypt. Whilst in Egypt he Commanded reinforcement camps at Abbassia and was later in Command of the Australian Overseas base in Egypt.

After Egypt, Keatinge Johnson set off for the Dardanelles on the Southland, the vessel being torpedoed in the Aegean Sea off the coast of Mudros in 1915. He was subsequently sent back to England having been invalided and suffering from dysentery. It was not long before he was back in Egypt as Assistant Commandant at Tel-el-Kebir before returning to England as Assistant Adjutant-General in 1916. He was made Commander of the A Group Training Brigade on Salisbury Plain before resigning from the AIF in 1917 with the permanent rank of Lieutenant-Colonel. For the remainder of the War he was at the Military Intelligence Department as cable censor.

== See also ==
- 1916 Pioneer Exhibition Game
