= 1916 Pioneer Exhibition Game =

Australian Rules football charity match

1916 AIF Pioneer Exhibition Game
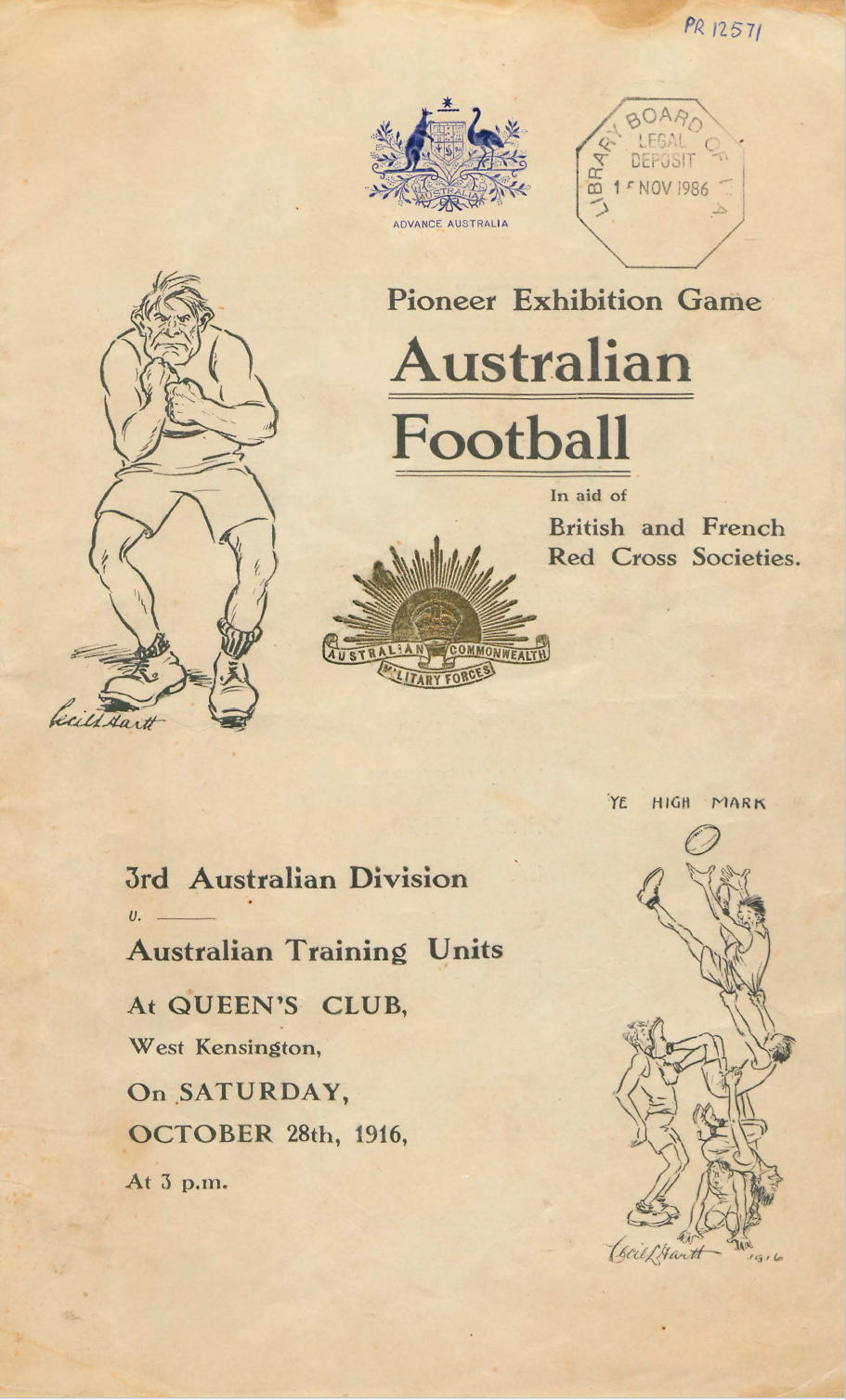
Third Australian Divisional Team	Australian Training Units Team
6.16 (52)	4.12 (36)
	1	2	3	4
DIV. TEAM	0.2 (2)	2.8 (20)	0.3 (3)	4.3 (27)
TR. UNITS	2.5 (17)	0.2 (2)	2.2 (14)	0.3 (3)
- Date: 28 October 1916
- Stadium: Queen's Club, West Kensington, London
- Attendance: 3,000 – 6,000 (various estimates)
- Umpires: S.R. Gray (first half); George Barry (second half)
- Coin toss won by: Australian Training Units Team
- Kicked toward: Northern end (kicked with the wind)

On Saturday 28 October 1916, the former Olympic champion swimmer and the later Lord Mayor of Melbourne, Lieutenant Frank Beaurepaire, organised an Australian Rules football match in aid of the British and the French Red Cross.

Promoted as the Pioneer Exhibition Game of Australian Football in London, and "believed to be the first exhibition of Australian football in London" (de Lacy, 1949), the match was contested between two teams of Australian servicemen who were stationed in the UK — the Australian Training Units Team and the Third Australian Divisional Team — all of whom were highly skilled footballers, and the majority of whom had already played senior football in their respective states prior to their enlistment.

The Third Australian Divisional team beat the Australian Training Units Team 6.16 (52) to 4.12 (36).

== Origin ==
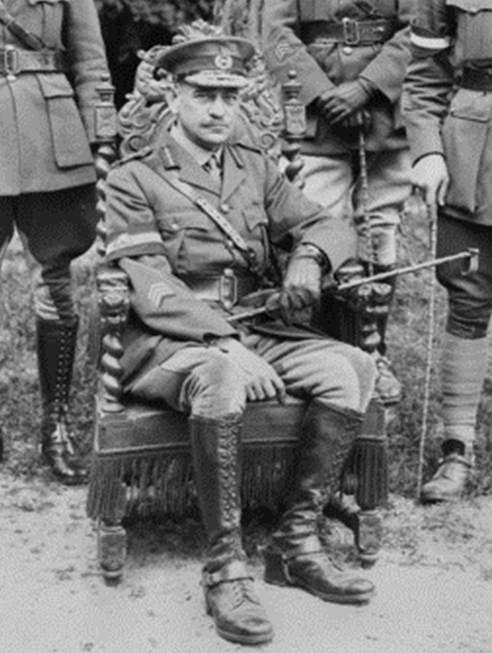
Monash during World War I

The match was suggested by Sir John Monash, then in command of the 3rd Australian Division, with the complete support of Brigadier-General Sir Newton Moore, former Premier of Western Australia and, at the time, General Officer Commanding Australian Imperial Force in the United Kingdom. Both agreed that, if at all possible, the game should be played in London, rather than on the Salisbury Plain:

Sir Frank Beaurepaire said today that the famous football match between the Third Divvy and the Training Units ... which is believed to be the first exhibition of Australian football in London ... held in Queen's Park, London, in 1916, would never have taken place but for the personal interest taken by the late Sir John Monash. ...
"General Monash was keen on sport for the troops", said Sir Frank. "There was a very strong side in the Third Divvy at Larkhill while the Training Units were at Tidmouth [sic] [viz., Tidworth]. We had decided to play at Larkhill until the suggestion came from Sir John that we should play in London.
"He made everything possible. The organisers had an office at Horseferry Road [viz., AIF Headquarters] and every difficulty was straightened out by Sir John." — The Sporting Globe, 27 August 1949.

=== Monash's views on the value of sport ===
Despite not being an athlete himself, Monash firmly believed in the power of sport to boost troop morale and keep his soldiers fit for war.

On the evening of Saturday, 17 January 1920, for instance, in his response on behalf of the Army to the toast "The Navy and Army" at a dinner at Scott's Hotel, Melbourne, hosted by the president of the Victorian Cricket Association, Donald Mackinnon, for the visiting AIF Cricket team, Monash made his position on the value of sport unequivocally clear:

"Sir John Monash, who was greeted with loud applause, said that all responsible commanders of the A.I.F. early in the war were impressed with the importance of sport, which was a powerful assistance. The Y.M.C.A. and the Australian Comforts Fund had sent liberal and adequate supplies of sporting material. (Hear, hear.) Every unit had its teams, and the keeping of the spirit of sport alive was an important factor in maintaining the [morale]. An appeal to the men that never failed was the appeal to their sportsmanship. (Hear, hear.) This was the inspiration which took them to many victories. The appeal "It's up to you to play for your side" always told. (Cheers.) The reason the Australians were recognised, as possessing the gift for keen work to a degree not exceeded by any other army in the war, was that they had the capacity for collective effort, which was due to the influence of sport in their life in Australia. (Cheers.)" — The Australasian, 24 January 1920.

== Planning ==
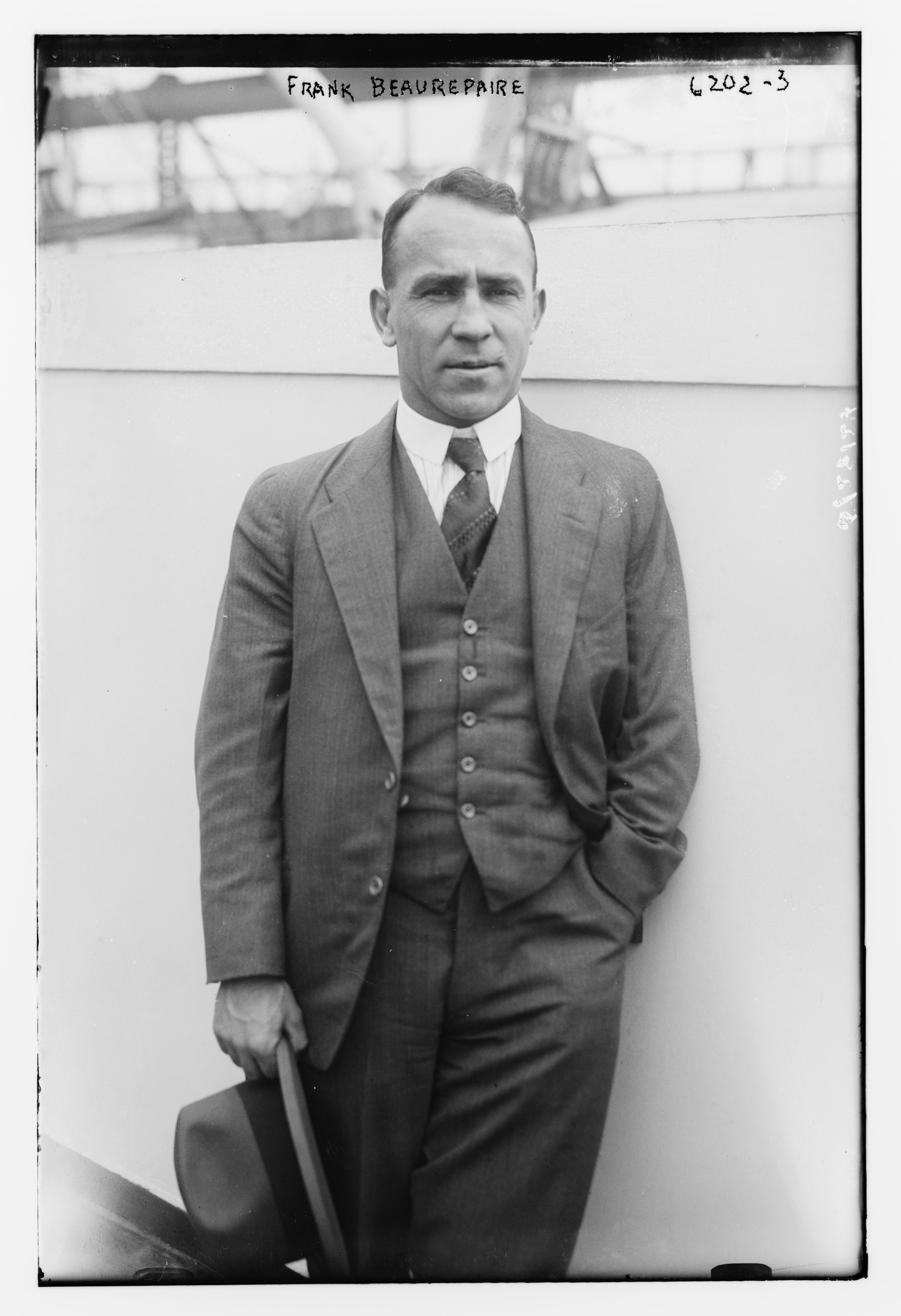
Frank Beaurepaire (c.1924)

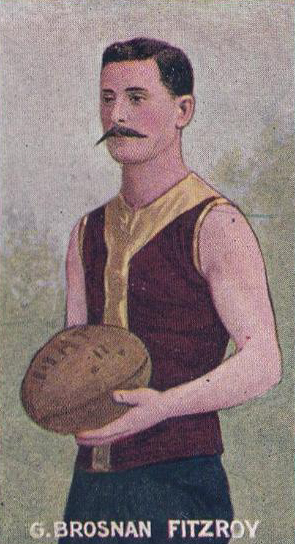
Gerald Brosnan (1906).

The two generals chose Lieutenant-Colonel C.A. Keatinge Johnson, then Commander of the A Group Training Brigade on Salisbury Plain, to be responsible for the arrangements; and, if possible, he was asked to select two first-class teams.

Keatinge-Johnson directed Major C.W. St John Clarke to begin the planning.

St. John-Clarke, in turn, appointed Lieutenant Frank Beaurepaire — who was in the UK at the time as a commissioner of the Young Men's Christian Association (YMCA), and serving with the 3rd Division — to be responsible for the 3rd Division, and Lieutenant H. Bartram of the 2nd Brigade, to be responsible for the 1st, 2nd, 4th, and 5th Divisions. Beaurepaire and Bartram immediately set to work and established an office in London. The match took almost three months to organise.

The principal organiser [of the event] turns out to be Frank Beaurepaire, the Y.M.C.A. official, and former swimming writer for The Winner.
To him is due the chief credit for the successful carrying out of all the innumerable details in connection with the undertaking — the getting together of the players, obtaining the necessary leave, arranging trial matches in order to get into some sort of form, the fixing on the ground, and having it marked off, arranging prices of admission, gatekeepers, etc., interviewing artists and others re programme, and the hundred and one other necessary items.
That the whole affair panned out so successfully speaks well for his organising ability.
But, then, we are used to expecting nothing but the best from any effort of Beaurepaire. — Gerald Brosnan, 10 January 1917.

=== Participants ===
The members of the team squads had been chosen on the basis of their footballing skills.

"On looking through the personnel of the teams the first thing that impresses one is the number of fine exponents of Australian football — men who have shown exceptional skill on the fields here [in Australia] before thousands — who took part in the match.
That the organisers hit on the physiological [sic] moment is evidenced by a glance at the names [of the players that took part].
Of course, there are any number of prominent footballers in the Army — enough to form a dozen or more teams — but to pick out a date on which such 36 first-class players as those who took part in the game could be brought together in London must be classed as nothing short of an inspiration.
Probably not once again during the currency of the war will such a galaxy of football talent be gathered in England at the one time . . . " — Gerald Brosnan, 20 December 1916.

The majority of those chosen had already played senior football in their respective states, and a number of them had also played interstate representative football:

- Three squad members — F.R. McGargill (New South Wales), P.J.H. Jory (Tasmania), and J.T. Cooper (Victoria) — had represented their respective States at the Second Australian National Football Carnival, in Adelaide, in August 1911.
- Three squad members — J. Brake, J.H. James, and W.I. Sewart — had represented Victoria in the interstate match against South Australia, at the MCG, on 6 July 1912, and three — J. Brake, J.T. Cooper, and W.I. Sewart — had represented Victoria in the return match, against South Australia, in Adelaide on 10 August 1912.
- Three squad members — J. Brake, J.T. Cooper, and B.M.F. Sloss — had represented Victoria in the interstate match against South Australia, in Adelaide, on 12 July 1913, and two — J.H. James and B.M.F. Sloss — had represented Victoria in the return match against South Australia at the MCG on 16 August 1913.
- Nine squad members — F.R. McCargill (New South Wales), J. Pugh (Tasmania), J.W. Robertson (South Australia), J. Brake, J.T. Cooper, C.H. Lilley, J.H. James, B.M.F. Sloss (Victoria), and D. Scullin (Western Australia) — had represented their respective States at the Third Australian National Football Carnival, in Sydney, in August 1914.
- One squad member, J.H. James, would go on (post-war) to represent Victoria in the interstate match against South Australia, in Adelaide, on 24 July 1920.
- One squad member, C.L. Hoft, would go on (post-war) to represent Western Australia at the Fourth Australian National Football Carnival, in Perth, in August 1921, South Australia at the Fifth Australian National Football Carnival, in Hobart, in August 1924, and, once again, South Australia at the Sixth Australian National Football Carnival, in Melbourne, in August 1927.

Despite their individual skills and expertise, those eventually chosen from the prospective squads to play on the day had not really been able to practice together as teams prior to the match.

== Promotion ==
The match was promoted as the "Pioneer Exhibition Game of Australian Football in London":

An Australian football match (an Australian Division v. Training Groups) will be played at Queen's Club, West Kensington, tomorrow, at 3 p.m., in aid of the British and French Red Cross Funds. The game, played by 18 players a side, will show how Australians have combined "Soccer" and Rugby. — The Times, Friday, 27 October 1916.

== The official programme ==
As well as providing a clear explanation of the game, which made it easy for spectators to follow, the official printed programme provided the names and numbers for the members of each squad's extended list of "possibles" — 25 for the Third Australian Division, and 26 for the Combined Training Units — from which the 18 players for the day in each team were to be selected.

Information provided in the official programme for new-to-the-game spectators

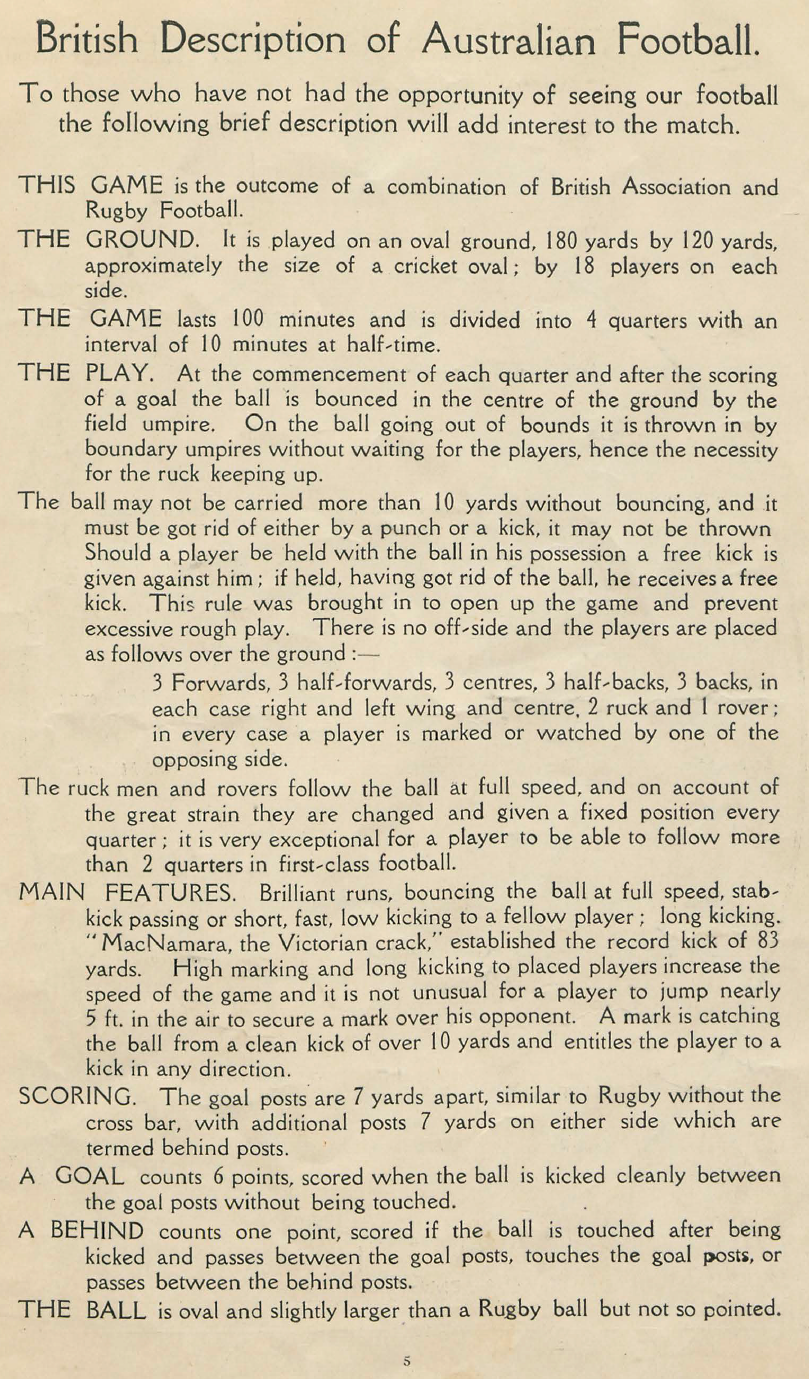
A brief description of
Australian Football (p. 5)

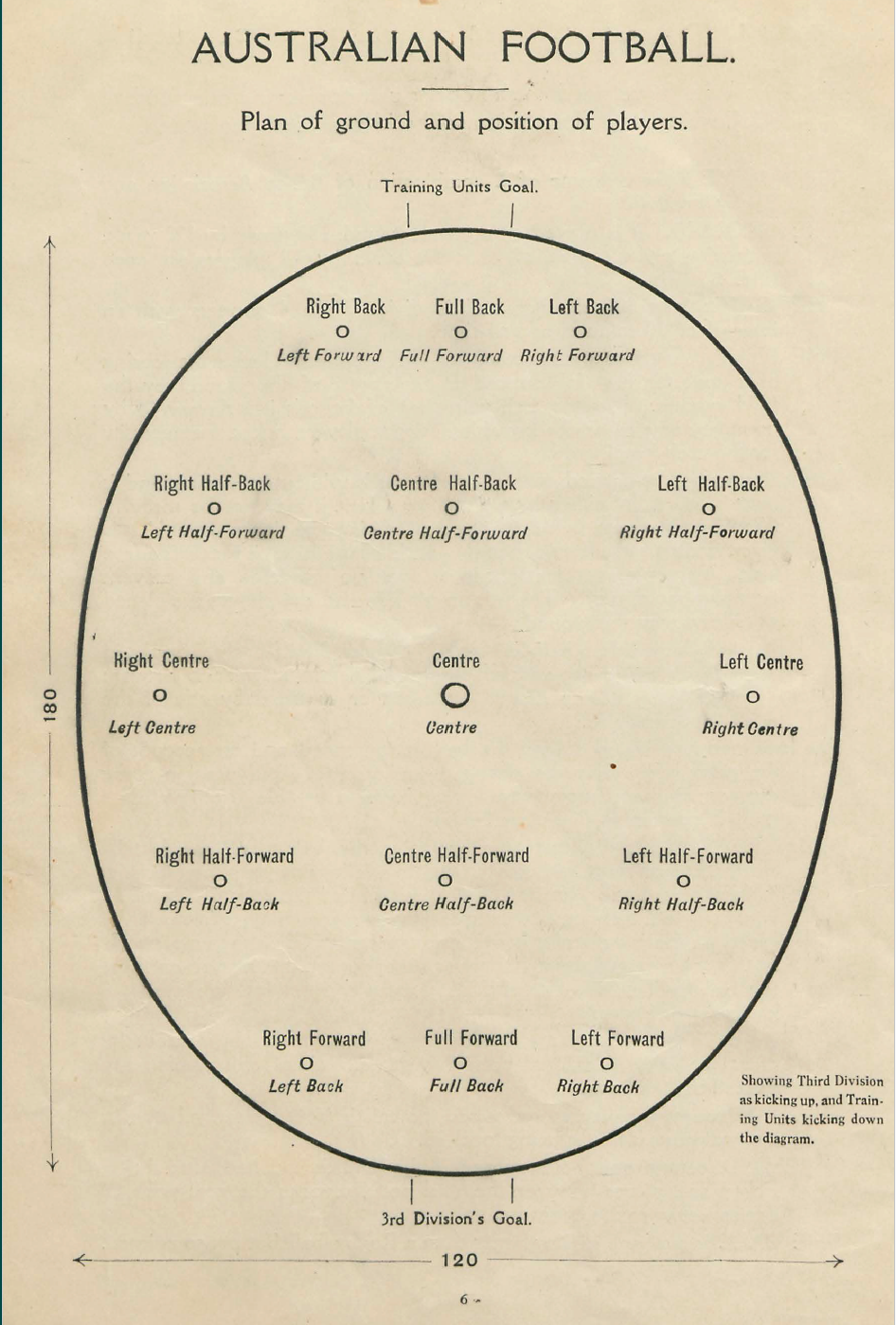
Plan of playing field and
the position of players (p. 6)

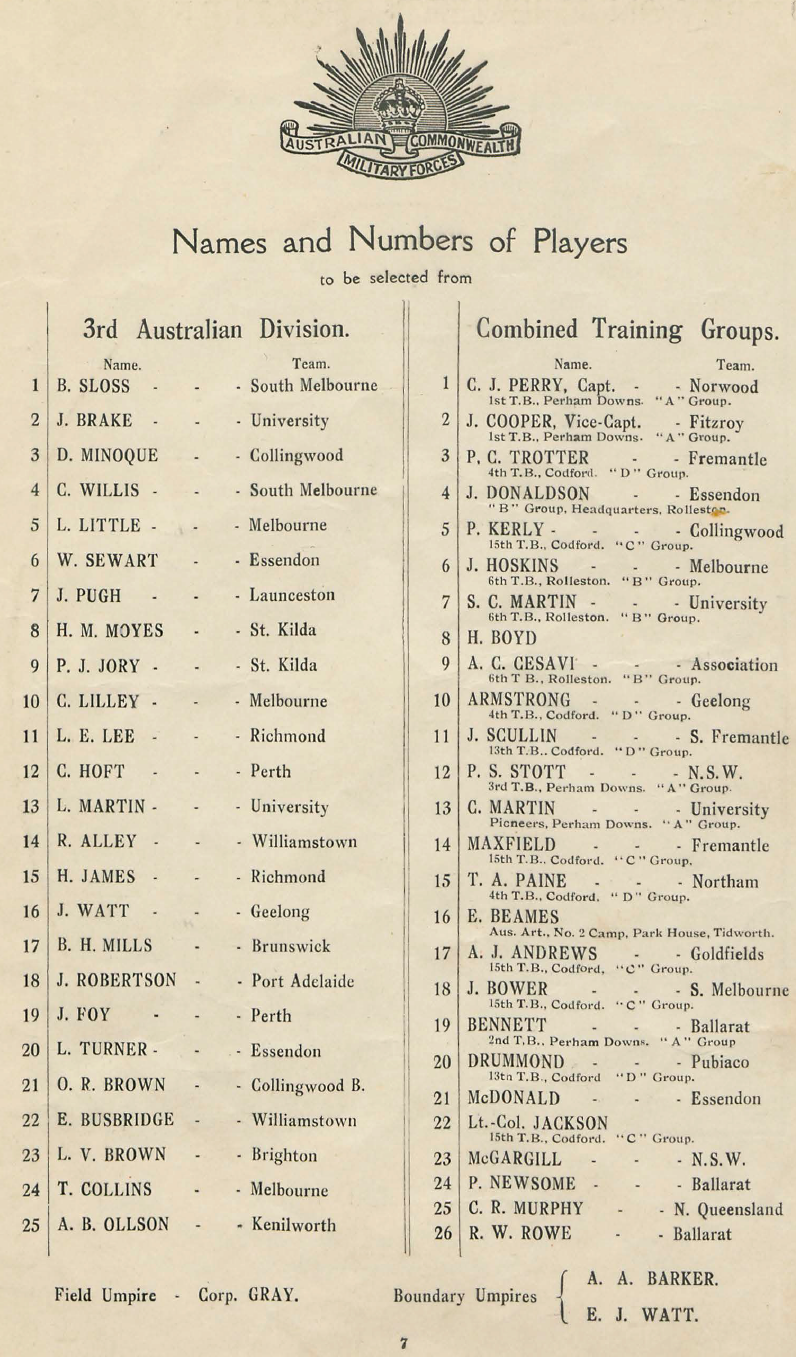
The names, numbers, and
the pre-war teams of those
"to be selected from" (p. 7)

=== Team lists ===
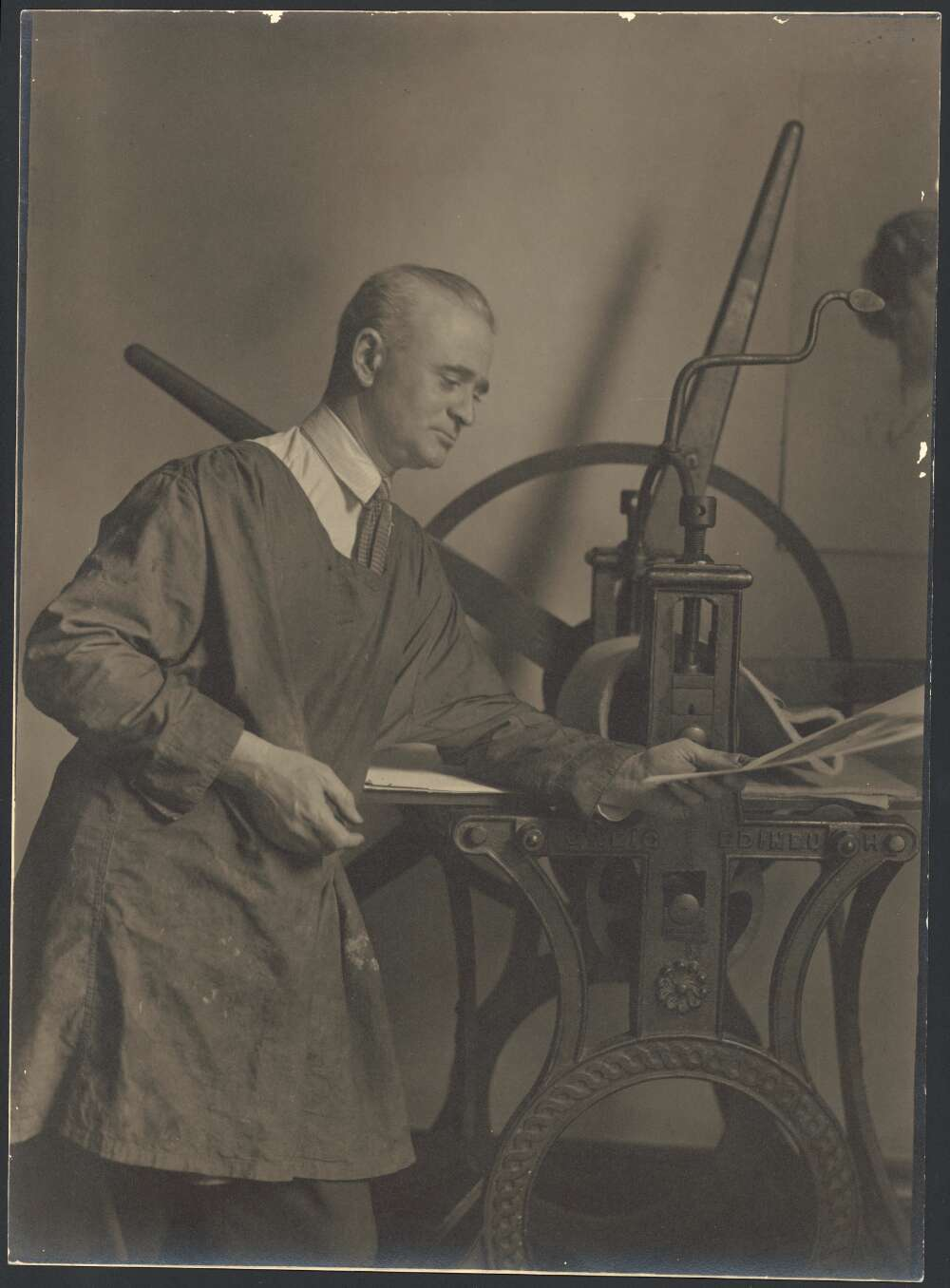
Will Dyson (1930s)

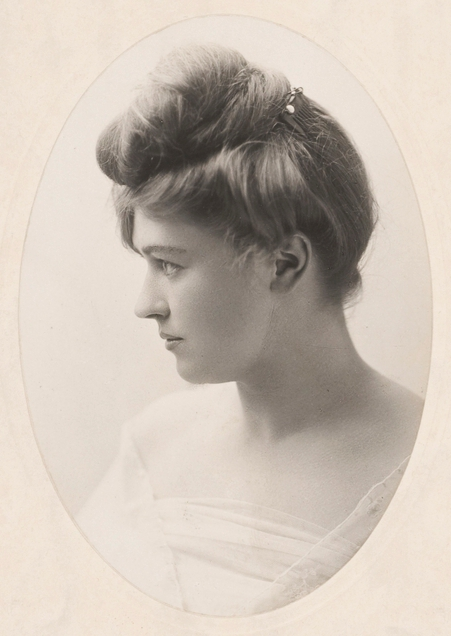
Ruby Lindsay (c.1908)

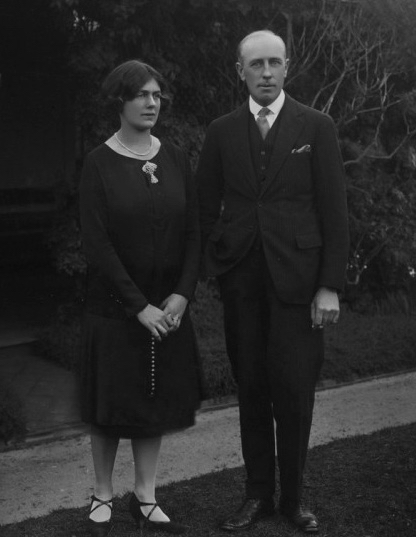
Joan and Daryl Lindsay (1925)

It is obvious from the differences in references to the same individual in various parts of the programme — for instance, "Fred Lindsay" (p. 2) vs. "Dan Lindsay" (p. 10); "Cecil Hart" (p. 2) vs. "Cecil J. Hartt" (p. 4), etc. — that, rather than a written draft of the programme having been created and cross-checked against all available artistic, sporting, and military records by a single, dedicated, and well-informed official, and the cluster of pages from which the programme was subsequently constructed having been imagined and, then, realised by a single creative designer, the entire programme was a set of associated fragments, each constructed by different individuals to whom various aspects of the various tasks involved had been delegated at different times, and all of which had been hurriedly aggregated together at last moment by some other person.

Consequently, the lists of squad members and match officials in the programme not only contain typographical errors (e.g., "Pubiaco" for "Subiaco"), but also some outright mis-identifications of specific individuals and/or their original football teams, all of which have been corrected and are accurately identified below — which, allowing for the changes due to differences in age, health, and physical fitness, and the consequences of their military service (such as being gassed while serving in France), are clearly those of the same individual that appears in the relevant team photograph taken on the day — except, that is, for the goal umpire "S.M Keen", the Third Division's [13] "L. Martin, University", and [23] "L.V. Brown, Brighton", and the Training Units' [14] "Maxfield, Fremantle", [19] "Bennett, Ballarat", and [21] "McDonald, Essendon", whose respective identification-puzzles (as of June 2022) seem impossible to resolve.

However, given that all of the players were serving soldiers whose stamina, current states of health (due to hepatitis, measles, meningitis, malaria, etc.), post-injury and post-wound levels of physical fitness-for-football, (post-gassing) respiratory capacities, and/or immediate demands of their military duties might make them suddenly available (or, not available) — for instance, Jack Cooper's condition had only just recovered enough from being gassed in France for him to be able to play for the Training Units team — it is not surprising that the names of two of the unexpectedly-available-on-the-day players (i.e., Alf Moore and Billy Orchard) were missing from their respective squad's list in the published programme.

=== Cartoon sketches by Australian artists ===
The official programme also presented a small collection of sketches by six well-known Australian artists resident in London at the time, all of whom "gave their services gratuitously":

- Will Dyson: William Henry Dyson (1880–1938), the husband of Ruby Lindsay. At the specific suggestion of the High Commissioner of Australia to the United Kingdom, the former Australian Prime Minister Andrew Fisher, Dyson was appointed as the first official Australian "war artist" in December 1916.
- Cecil L. Hartt: Cecil Lawrence Hartt (1884–1930), having enlisted in the AIF at the age of 30, he was seriously wounded in his right thigh and left ankle fighting with the Anzacs at Gallipoli on 28 August 1915. Invalided to England, he was recuperating in the Reading Military Hospital at the time of the match. He did not recover enough to resume active service, and was repatriated to Australia in June 1918, discharged as medically unfit for service in July 1918; and, in May 1930, most likely due to his on-going post-traumatic stress and the sequelae of his war injuries, he committed suicide.
- Fred Leist: Frederick William Leist (1873–1945), cartoonist, graphic artist, and painter; another official Australian "war artist", appointed later than Will Dyson.
- Ruby Lind: that is, Ruby Lindsay (1885–1919), the sister of Norman, Percy, Lionel, and Daryl Lindsay, painter, cartoonist, poster-designer, book illustrator, and the wife of Will Dyson. She died on 12 March 1919 during the Spanish flu pandemic.
- Dan Lindsay: that is, Daryl Ernest Lindsay (1889–1976) — N.B.: not the (otherwise) famous "Fred Lindsay" mistakenly listed as the cartoon's contributor on page 2 of the programme — the brother of Lionel, Norman, Percy, and Ruby Lindsay; the brother-in-law, and former batman of Will Dyson. Known to his friends as "Dan", he was the husband of Joan Lindsay, author of Picnic at Hanging Rock. His contribution to the programme was one of the first of his cartoons to be published, and its subject reflects the fact that, for at least four years prior to his enlistment, Lindsay had worked in remote Queensland as a jackaroo.
  - Although famous for his later production of a wide range of watercolours and other works of art relating to soldiers and warfare, Daryl Lindsay's art made a very substantial contribution to the advancement of military reconstructive surgery with the extensive set of images he produced for Sir Harold Gillies, while serving in 1918 and 1919 as the specialist, in-house "medical artist" at the specialist military hospital at Sidcup, in Kent.
- Laurie Tayler: Laurence Bush Tayler (1882–1972), painter, graphic artist, and illustrator.
Sketches especially drawn for the game's official programme

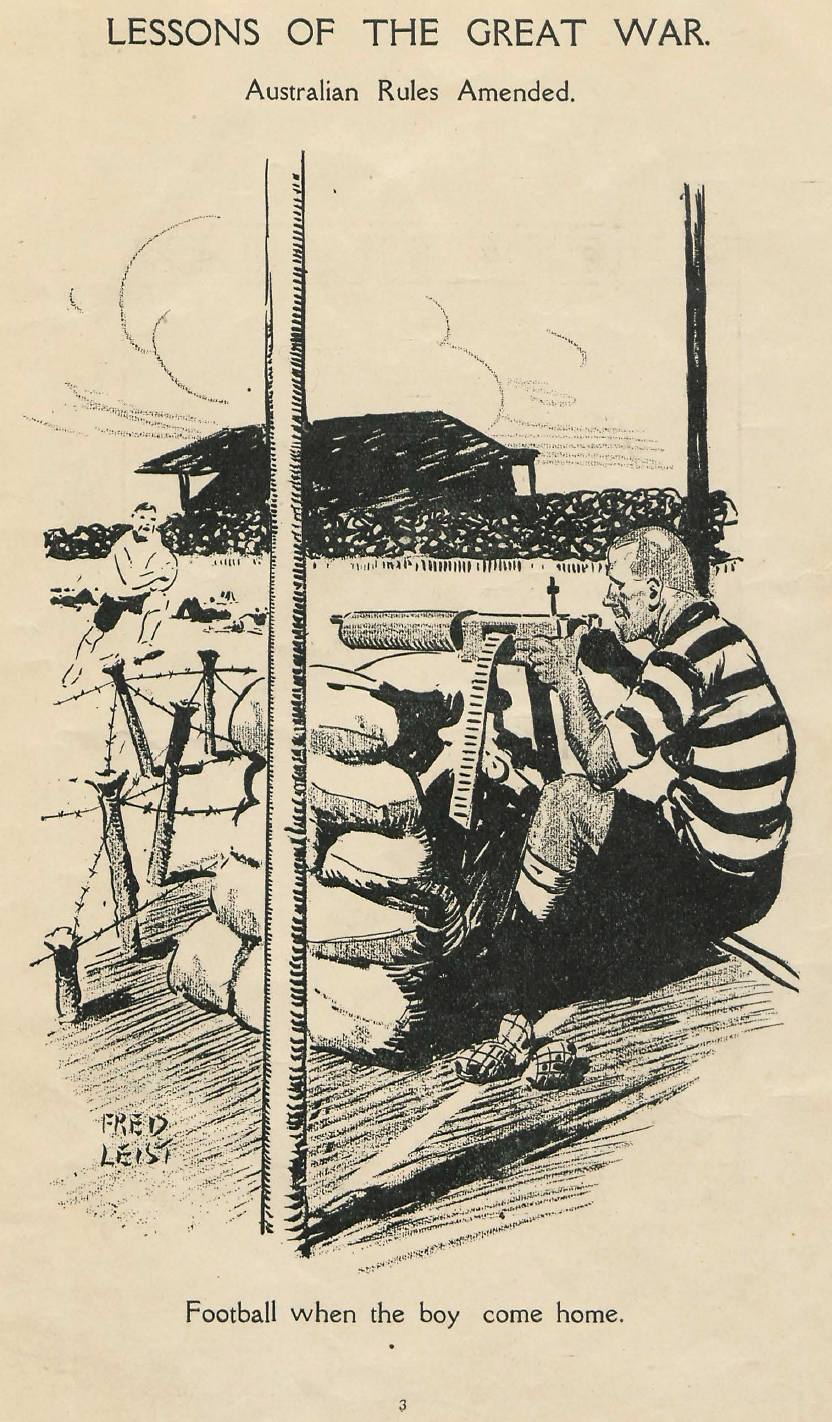
Fred Leist
(p. 3)

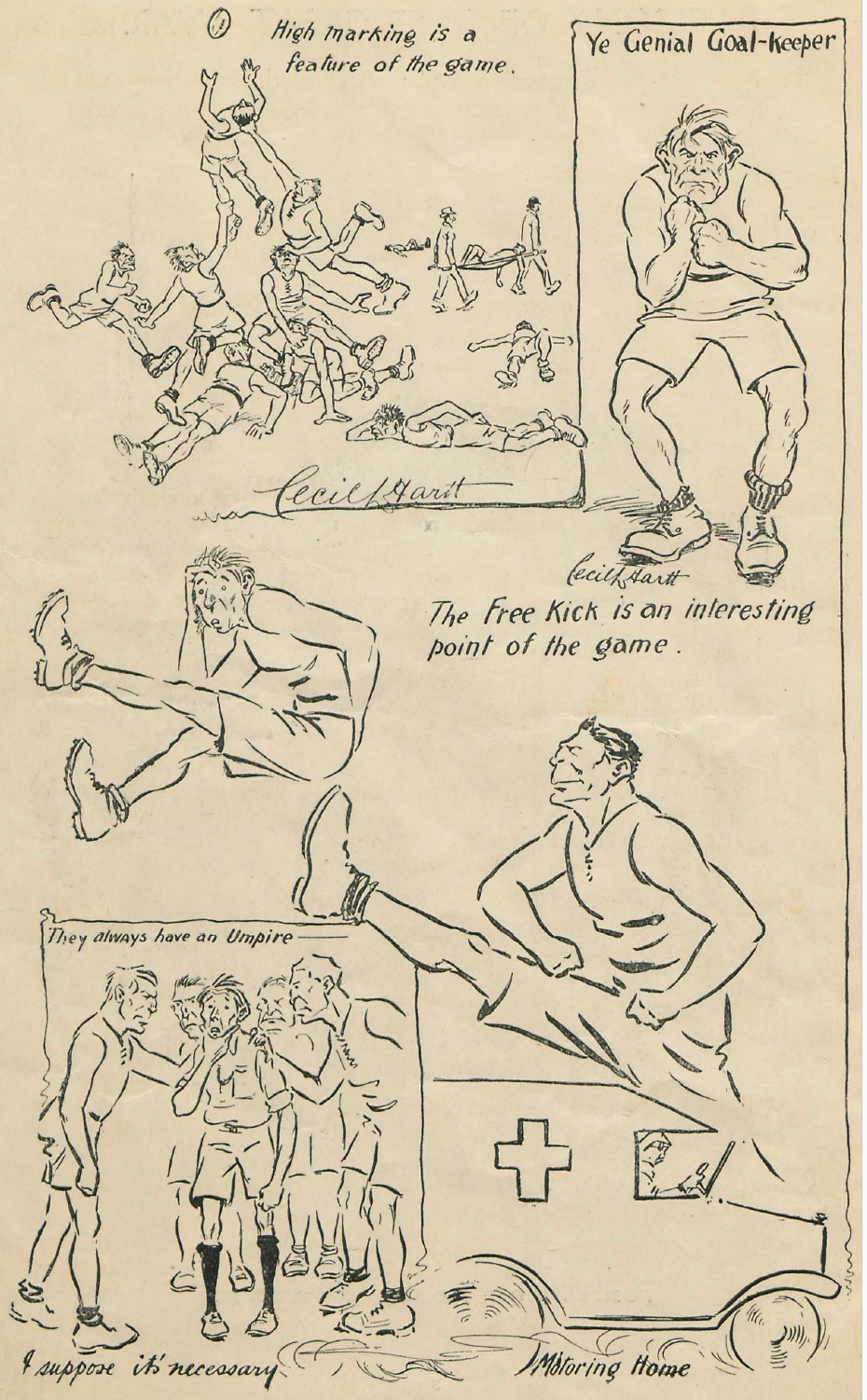
Cecil L. Hartt
(p. 4)

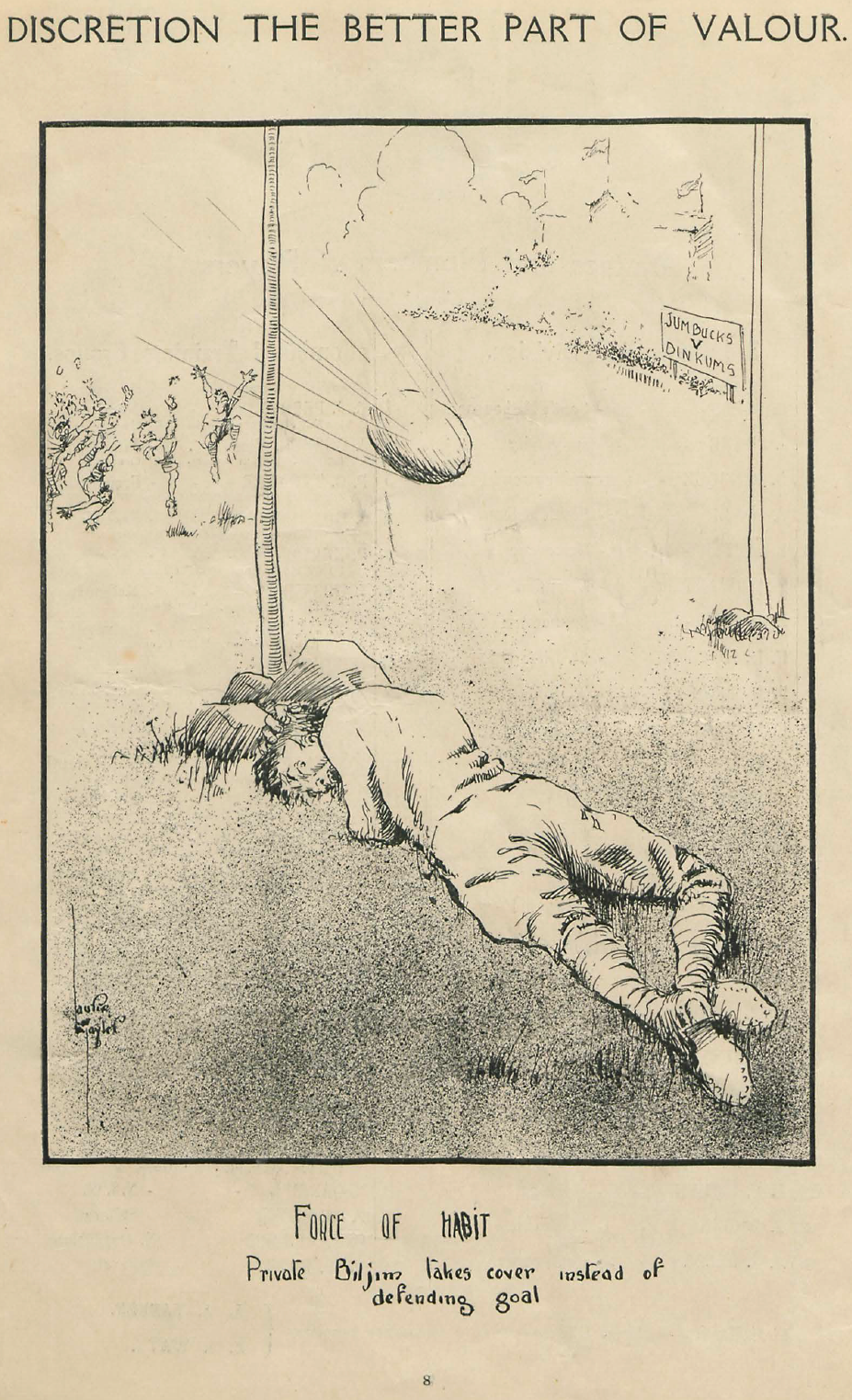
Laurie Tayler
(p. 8)

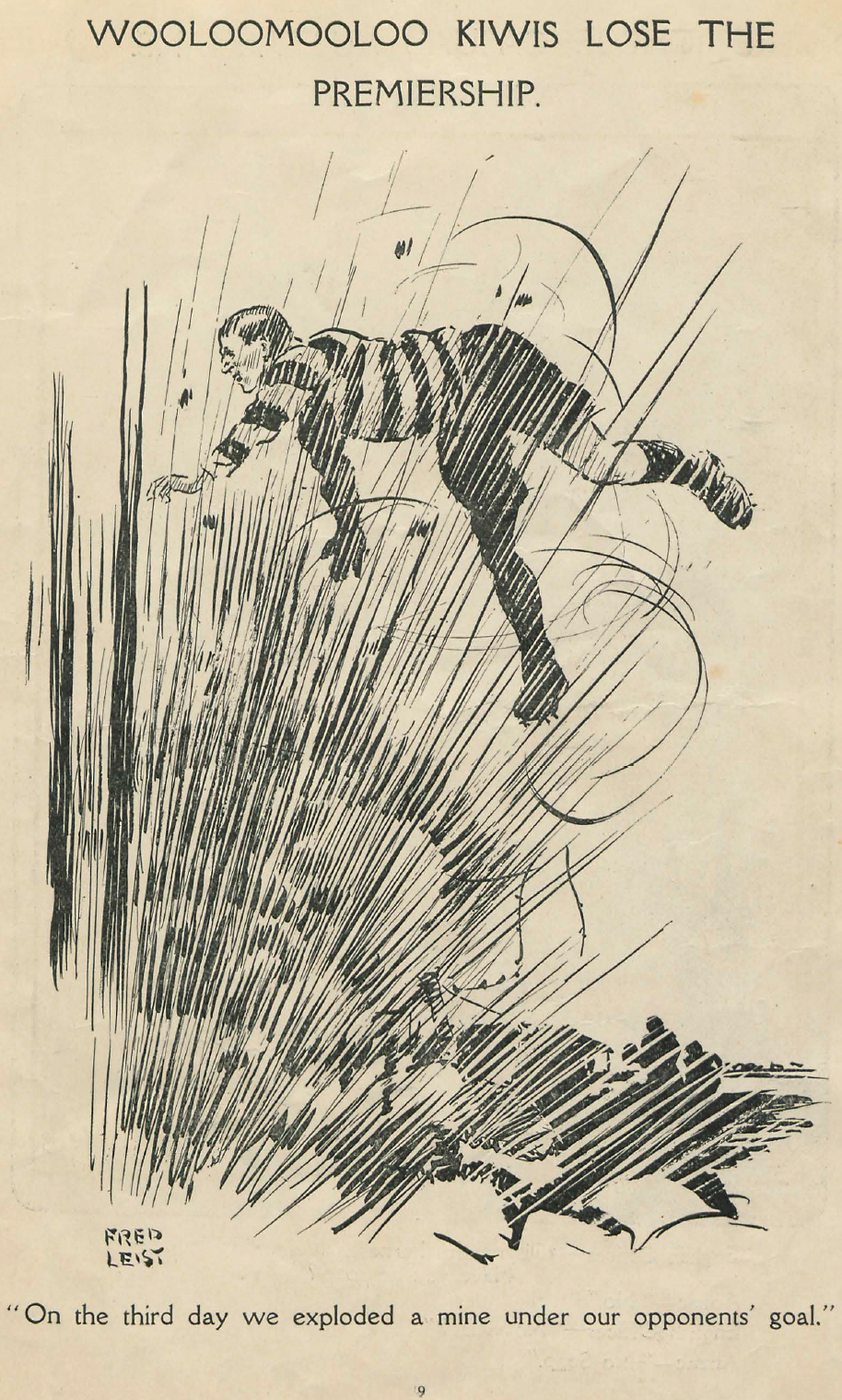
Fred Leist
(p. 9)

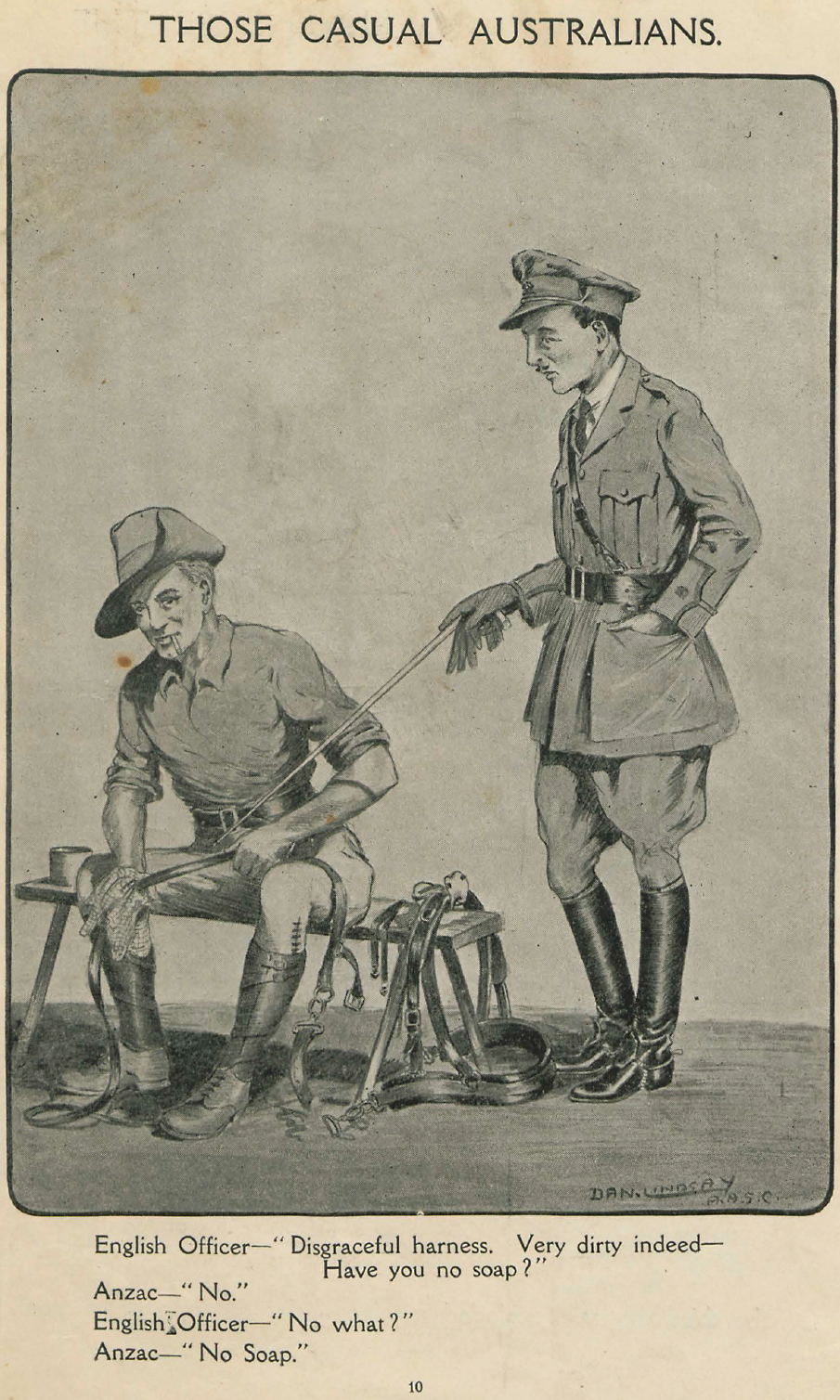
Dan Lindsay
(p. 10)

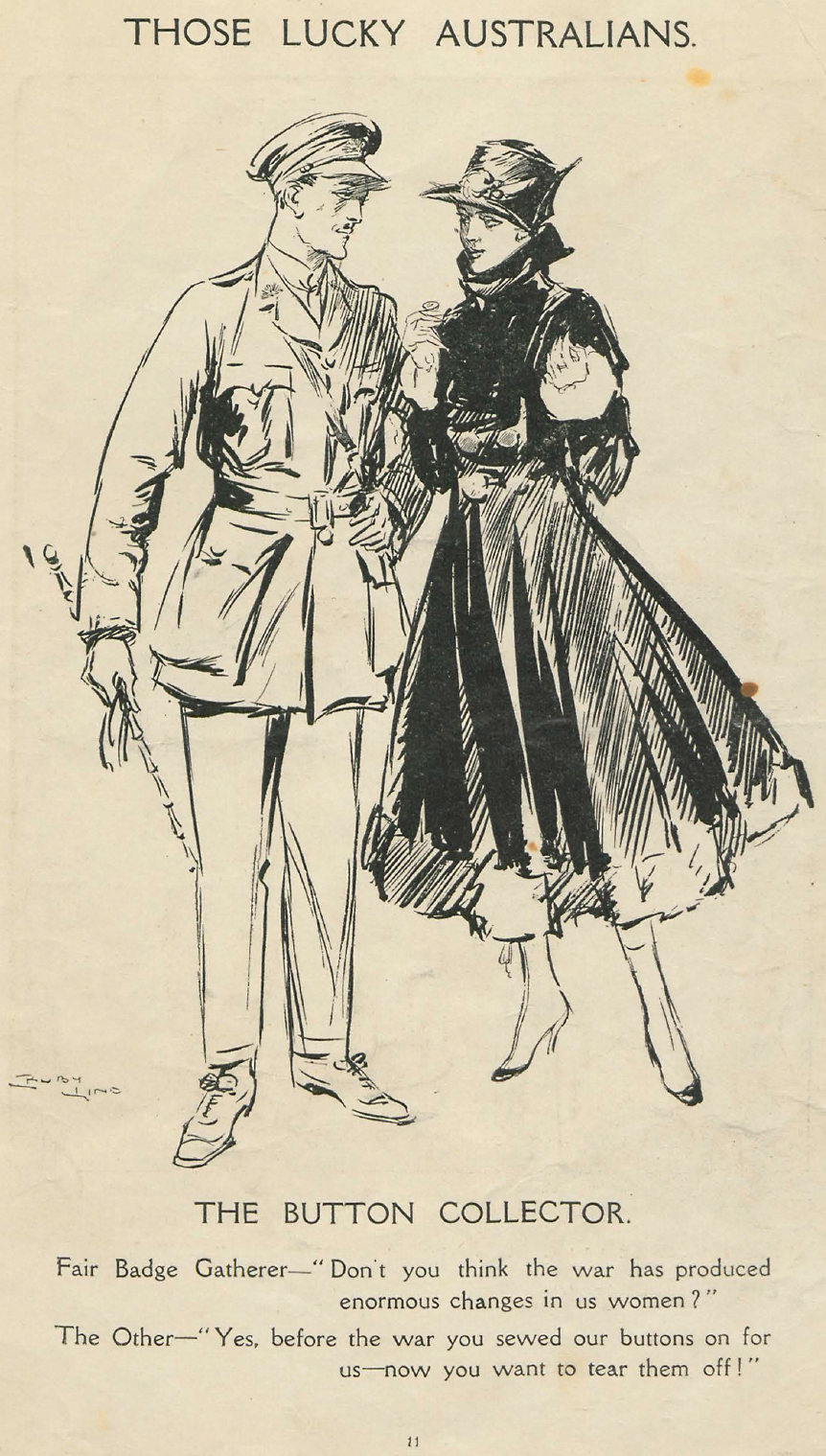
Ruby Lind
(p. 11)

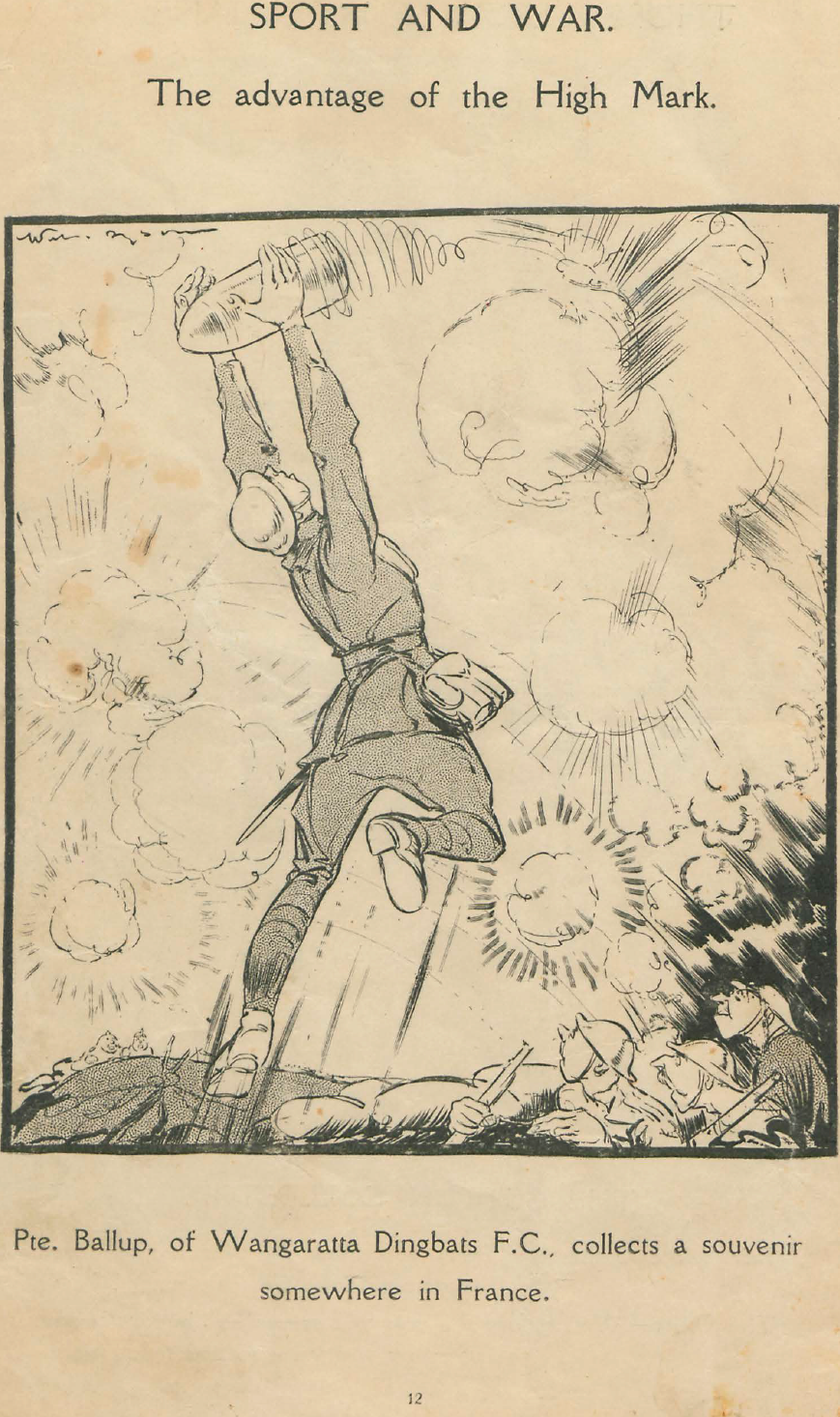
Will Dyson
(p. 12)

=== Sales ===
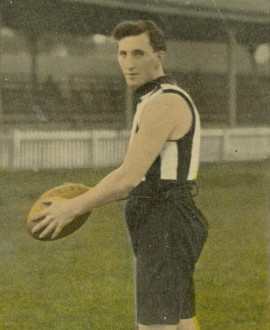
Dan Minogue, Collingwood.

No special sale price was fixed for the programmes. A staff of 80 girls, each of whom carried their allocation of programmes in a basket decorated with the green and gold colours of Australia, volunteered to dispose of them, and a prize was offered for the girl whose work netted the best returns. The winning girl handed in more than £70:

"[The] souvenir programmes, in aid of the French Red Cross funds sold like hot cakes, mainly because the sellers were pretty English girls. They did a roaring trade among the Diggers, though one more venturesome than the rest created a sensation when she walked into one of the dressing rooms at half-time and endeavoured to sell programmes to the players." — The Sporting Globe, 10 September 1930.
"With donations, the game raised close on £1000 for the British and French Red Cross. One girl alone collected £70 from the sale of programmes. She must have been the young lady who, in her eagerness to collect, unwittingly blundered into our dressing-room, to retire precipitantly in blushing confusion from the midst of big, hulking soldier-footballers in varying stages of dress — and undress!" — Dan Minogue's (1937) recollection of the match.

== The football ==
Two hand-stitched footballs were made for the match by Corporal C.C. McMullen, who had been a leatherworker at Henry Fordham's football factory in Sydney Road, Brunswick, prior to his enlistment in the First AIF. The Fordham footballs — i.e., contrasted with the "Sherrin" footballs (see the football held by Dan Minogue in the image above) that had been (c.1902) especially designed to facilitate the stab-kicking of the Collingwood footballers — were being used in the West Australian Goldfields League as early as 1907. Also, Fordham footballs were the official ball for the Victorian Football Association (VFA) for fourteen years in the 1920s and 1930s.

The balls that McMullen made for the match were marked "The AIF Ball" on one side, and "Match II" on the other. One of the balls is currently (as of June 2022) on display at the Dandenong/Cranbourne Sub Branch of the RSL.

- "Match II" (see the football held by Gerald Brosnan, in the image above, and by the George Barry, the umpire, in both team photographs) was a generic descriptor, used by Fordham, Ross Faulkner, the Melbourne Sports Depot, and other football manufacturers, to identify Australian Rules footballs that were of such quality that they could be used in First XVIII VFL matches.

== Match officials ==
- Field umpires: S.R. Gray (first half of the match), squatting, at the extreme right of the front row in the Divisional Team photograph, and George Barry (second half of the match), second umpire from the left, holding the ball, in the front row of each photograph.
- Boundary Umpires: Thomas Sinton Hewitt (replacing the programme's A.A. Barker), third umpire from the left in the front row of each photograph. and E.J. "Eddie" Watt, umpire at left in the front row of each photograph (wounded in action 7 June 1917).
- Goal Umpires: Lieutenant A.E. Olsson, and S.M. Keen.

== Third Australian Divisional Squad ==
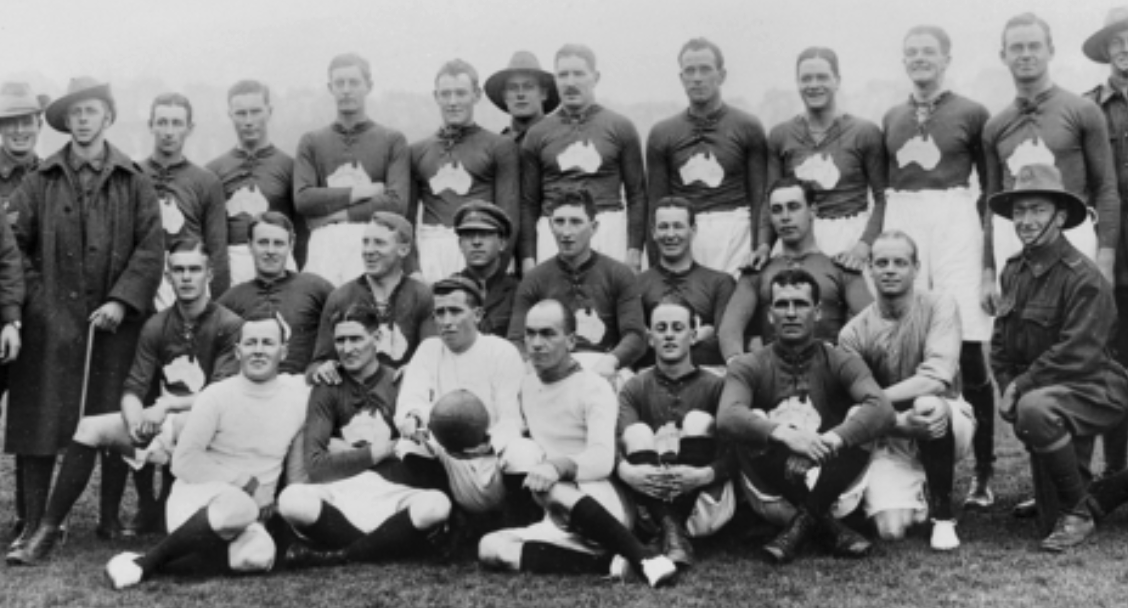
Third Divisional Team: 28 October 1916 (H.16689). Back Row (players only), left to right: [12] C.L. Hoft; [–] W.H. Orchard; [13] L. Martin; [11] L.E. Lee; [2] J.Brake; [15] J.H. James; [4] C.B. Willis; [5] L.P. Little; [19] J.F. Foy. Middle Row, left to right: [8] H.M. Moyes; [1] C.H. Lilley; [1] B.M.F. Sloss (c); F. Beaurepaire; [3] D.T. Minogue; [7] J. Pugh; [9] P.J.H. Jory. Front Row (players and umpires, kneeling and squatting), left to right: E.J. Watt; [6] W.I. Sewart; G. Barry; T.S. Hewitt; [17] B.H. Mills; [9] E.J. Alley; S.R. Gray.

The Divisional Team played in the blue guernsey which had been made in London especially for the match, that had a large white map of Australia (minus Tasmania) on the centre of its front, and in white shorts.

=== The team ===
The eighteen players that took the field were:

- E.J. "Ted" Alley [14] (Williamstown, formerly South Melbourne), player cross-legged at the hard right of the front row.
- Frank Beaurepaire, team manager, the man in uniform, middle of middle row.
- J. "Jack" Brake [2] (Melbourne, formerly University), fifth player from left, back row.
- J.F. "Jim" Foy [19] (Perth), player at extreme right, back row. He was killed in action, near Armentières, Northern France, on 14 March 1917.
- C.L. "Cyril" Hoft [12] (Perth), player at the extreme left, back row.
- J.H. "Hughie" James [15] (Richmond), fourth player from right, back row.
- P.J.H. "Percy" Jory [9] (St Kilda), at right of middle row, with Carl Willis' hands on his shoulders.
- L.E. "Les" Lee [11] (Richmond & Williamstown), fourth player from left, back row. Killed in action during the Battle of Messines (1917) on 8 June 1917.
- C.H. "Charlie" Lilley [10] (Melbourne), second from left, middle row.
- L.P. "Leo" Little [5] (University), second from right, back row.
- L. Martin [13] (University), third player from left, back row.
- B.H. "Ben" Mills [17] (Northcote), second player from the right, front row.
- D.T. "Dan" Minogue [3] (Collingwood), team vice-captain, seated at right of Frank Beaurepaire, middle row.
- H.M. "Harry" Moyes [8] (St Kilda), player at the extreme left of the middle row.
- W.H. "Billy" Orchard [–] (Geelong), second from left, in back row.
- J. "James" Pugh [7] (City), second from right, in middle row. Killed in action, in France, on 28 January 1917.
- W.I. "Bill" Sewart [6] (Essendon), first player from left, front row.
- B.M.F. "Bruce" Sloss [1] (South Melbourne), team captain, seated at left of Frank Beaurepaire, middle row. Killed in action at Armentières, Northern France, on 4 January 1917.
- C.J. "Carl" Willis [4] (University, and South Melbourne), third from right, back row; died of "pleurisy and pneumonia, accentuated by the effects of [First World War] gas" at the age of 37.

=== Squad members not selected ===
Eight of those listed in the official programme as members of the Third Division's squad; who, although "selected to go to London and hold themselves in readiness if required to play" (Minogue & Millar, 1937), did not take the field that day:

- L.V. Brown [23] (Brighton).
- O.R. Brown [21] (Collingwood Districts).
- E.J. "Ted" Busbridge [22] (Williamstown). Wounded in action in France on 11 April 1917, he was captured and spent the remainder of the war as a prisoner of war in Germany.
- T.J. "Tim" Collins [24] (Melbourne).
- A.E. Ollson [25] (Kenilworth), who served as one of the match's two goal umpires (see above).
- J.W. Robertson [18] (Port Adelaide).
- L.C. "Les" Turner [20] (Essendon Association, Prahran, and South Melbourne).
- J.W. "Jack" Watt [16] (Geelong).

== Australian Training Units Squad ==
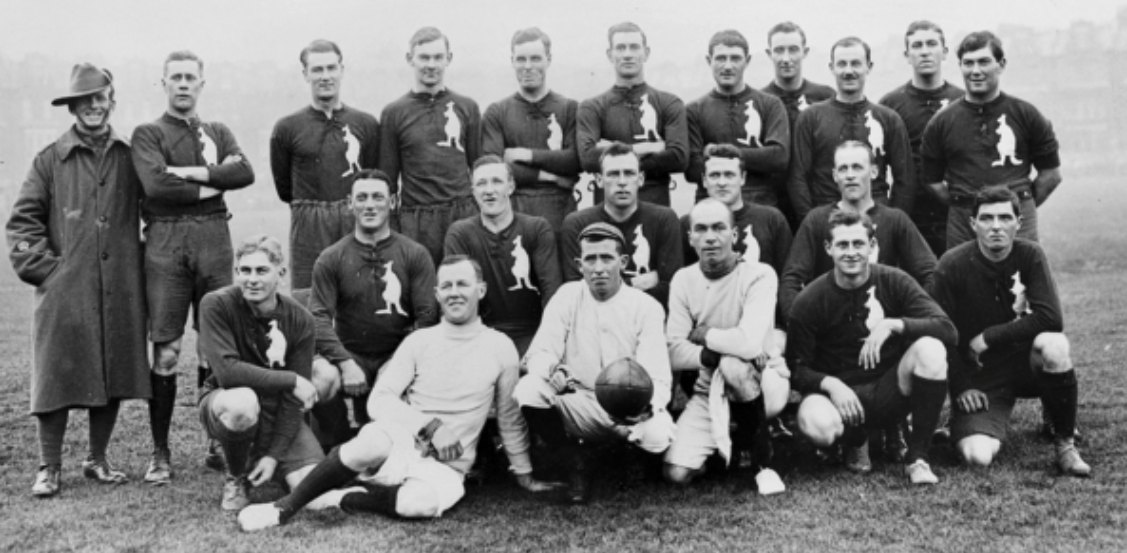
Training Units Team: 28 October 1916 (H.16688). Back Row (players only), left to right: [18] G.B. Bower; [6] T.P. Hosking; [4] C. Donaldson; [–] A.M. Moore; [16] E.F. Beames; [2] J.T. Cooper; [11] D. Scullin; [7] S.C. Martin; [5] H.C. Kerley; [10] O.R. Armstrong. Middle Row, left to right: [3] P.G. Trotter; — ; [1] C.J. Perry (c); [22] A. Jackson; [8] H.J. Boyd. Front Row (players and umpires, kneeling), left to right: [15] T. Paine; E.J. Watt; G. Barry; T.S. Hewitt; — ; [9] I. Cesari.

The Training Units played in the red guernsey which had been made in London especially for the match, that had a large white kangaroo on its left breast, and in white shorts.

=== The team ===
The eighteen players that took the field were:

- O.R. "Ossy" Armstrong [10] (Geelong), far right, back row. He was captured by the Germans on 11 April 1917, and was a prisoner of war.
- E.F. "Ernest" Beames [16] (Norwood), fifth player from left, back row.
- G.B. "George" Bower [18] (South Melbourne), player at the extreme left, back row.
- H.J. "Hugh" Boyd [8] (University/South Bendigo), extreme right, centre row.
- I. "Italo" Cesari [9] (Dromana, Peninsular Association), player kneeling at far right.
- J.T. "Jack" Cooper [2] (Fitzroy), vice-captain, fifth from right, back row. Killed in action during the Battle of Passchendaele on 20 September 1917.
- C. "Clyde" Donaldson [4] (Essendon), third player from left, top row.
- T.P. "Phil" Hosking [6] (Melbourne), second player from left, back row. Wounded twice in action: gassed (July 1918); gunshot wounds to thigh (fractured femur, etc., August 1918).
- A. "Alf" Jackson [22] (Essendon), second from right, middle row.
- H.C. "Harry" Kerley [5] (Collingwood), second from right, back row.
- S.C "Stan" Martin [7] (University), third from right, back row. Killed in action at Bullecourt, France on 3 May 1917.
- Maxfield [14] (Fremantle).
- McDonald [21] (Essendon).
- A.M. "Mac" Moore [–] (Norwood), fourth player from left, back row.
- T. "Thomas" Paine [15] (Union Football Club, Northam, Tasmania), player at left, front row. Wounded twice in action: gunshot wounds to hand (June 1917); gunshot wounds to head (September 1917).
- Chaplain-Captain C.J. "Charlie" Perry [1] (Norwood), third from left, middle row, team captain.
- D.F. "Dan" Scullin [11] (Mines Rovers FC, Kalgoorlie-Boulder), fourth from right, back row, killed in action, in France, on 26 September 1917.
- P.G. "Percy" Trotter [3] (East Fremantle), at extreme left, middle row.

=== Squad members not selected ===
Eight of those listed in the official programme as members of the Training Group's squad; who, although "selected to go to London and hold themselves in readiness if required to play" (Minogue & Millar, 1937), did not take the field that day:

- A.J. Andrews [17] (Goldfields).
- Bennett [19] (Ballarat).
- William "Roy" Drummond [20] (Port Adelaide).
- F.R. "Freddy" McGargill [23] (N.S.W.).
- C.R. Murphy [25] (N. Queensland).
- P. Newsome [24] (Ballarat).
- R.W. "Dick" Rowe [26] (Ballarat), as a member of the AIF's 6th Battalion Rowe was one of those who landed at Anzac Cove on 25 April 1915.
- P.S. "Phil" Stott [12] (Latrobe), as a member of the AIF's 12th Battalion Stott was one of those who landed at Anzac Cove on 25 April 1915; he was wounded in action three times (at Gallipoli on 26 April 1915, in France on 10 April 1917, and in France on 19 September 1918).

== Saturday, 28 October 1916 ==
The game was played at Queen's Club, West Kensington, on the cold, bleak, overcast, and windy late-Autumn afternoon of Saturday, 28 October 1916, before a crowd that was estimated at 3,000, by many, 5,000, by some, and as many as 6,000 by others. There's no doubt that the considerably smaller-than-expected crowd — almost exclusively limited to those expressly invited to the match, and those Australian servicemen who took advantage of the leave that Monash had granted them on the day — was entirely due to the consequences of the inclement weather.

A very strong goal-to-goal wind favoured one end of the ground, and the playing field itself was the wrong shape and the wrong size: it was considerably shorter and narrower than the sorts of field the players were accustomed to playing upon back in Australia — it measured at 120 yards (110 m) wide and 180 yards (165 m) long — and this significant reduction in the overall available playing area contributed to somewhat more congested play, at times, than usual.

The match began at 3PM local time. It was played over four 20-minute quarters — and, over and above those 80 minutes of elapsed playing time, the three additional breaks between the quarters meant that on such a gloomy day (sunset was at 4.42 PM) the final minutes of the match were played in very, very poor light conditions.

== The match ==
The Third Australian Divisional Team was the pre-match favourite; at the time of the match they were in much better shape, mainly because, unlike those of the First, Second, Fourth, and Fifth Divisions, the soldiers of the Third Division were the only ones who had not yet seen any active overseas service. The Divisional team beat the Australian Training Units Team 6.16 (52) to 4.12 (36).

=== Player positions ===
According to the records supplied to Vic Johnson by Italo Cesari in 1954, the Training Units players' positions were:

Australian Training Units Team: 28 October 1916.
Backs:	H.J. Boyd [8]	D. Scullin [11]	McDonald [21]
Half-Backs:	J.T. Cooper [2]	C.J. Perry [1] (c)	E.F. Beames [2]
Centres:	S.C. Martin [7]	G.B. Bower [18]	T. Paine [15]
Half-Forwards:	H.C. Kerley [5]	T.S. Hosking [6]	A.M. Moore [–]
Forwards:	Maxfield [14]	A. Jackson [22]	O.R. Armstrong [10]
Followers:	C. Donaldson [4]	I. Cesari [9]	P.G. Trotter [3]

=== First quarter ===
The two captains met in the centre of the ground. The Training Unit's captain, Charlie Perry, won the toss, and chose to kick with the wind to the northern end of the ground. The match started off at a brisk, enthusiastic pace, with both sides competing strongly and, to the spectator's delight, displaying the game's characteristic "high marking and long kicking". Although the Training Units team had the advantage of the strong wind, its inaccurate kicking resulted in just two goals (and 5 behinds), whilst the Divisional team was restricted to a score of two behinds — mainly due to the outstanding efforts of the training Unit's Percy Trotter and Clyde Donaldson.

=== Second quarter ===
Kicking with the strong wind, with Jack Brake, Hughie James, and Les Lee "marking magnificently", and with Cyril Hoft "sparkling" on the wing, the even-less-accurate Divisional team could only kick two goals (and 8 behinds), whilst the Training Units team was restricted to just 2 behinds. Percy Jory kicked a goal with a drop-kick. At half-time, the Divisional team was leading by 3 points.

=== Third quarter ===
The third quarter was considered to be "the best of the match". It was notable for the play moving rapidly backwards-and-forwards up and down the ground — the "play rocked to and fro in a buzzing, tense atmosphere", thrilling the crowd (who were "on their toes, roaring the players on") with the "strong ruck clashes", the "swift passing", the "long drop-kicking", and the "finger-tip marks" — and with the backlines of each team dominating their forward opponents. The Training Units team, which had kicked two goals (and 2 behinds) to the Divisional team's 2 behinds, had a lead of 8 points at the three-quarter time interval.

=== Last quarter ===
As the match progressed it was becoming increasingly obvious that the match fitness of the players (or the absence thereof), and not just the strong wind favouring one end of the ground, would play a large part in the final result of the match (Richardson, 2016, p. 171). Kicking with the wind, and in "a particularly fierce last quarter" that was "full of fire and color [sic]" in which "both sides [were] striving mightily", with "their military blood up, the 36 men played with fanatical fervor [sic]", Les Lee, Hughie James, and Dan Minogue gained ascendancy in the ruck, and the Divisional team drew away from the tiring Training Units team, scoring four goals (and 3 behinds) to 3 behinds, and winning the match by 16 points.

=== Post-match ===
In 1937, Dan Minogue recalled that, "the match was played on a Saturday afternoon. The soldiers who had taken part in it had leave in London till Sunday night. This they celebrated in true Digger style."

=== Progressive and final scores ===
Team	1	2	3	Final
Third Australian; Divisional Team	0.2 (2)	2.10 (22)	2.13 (25)	6.16 (52)
Australian Training; Units Team	2.5 (17)	2.7 (19)	4.9 (33)	4.12 (36)

- Goals:
  - Divisional: Moyes (2), Willis (2), Jory (1), and Lee (1).
  - Training Units: Moore (1), Paine (1), Maxfield (1), and Armstrong (1).
- Best Players:
  - Divisional: James, Moyes, Willis, Brake, Minogue, Alley, Lilley, Little, Mills, Foy, and Lee.
  - Training Units: Perry, Trotter, Cooper, Bower, Kerley, Paine, Armstrong, Martin, and Scullin.

== Profits ==
The admission charges to the match were 1/-, 2/6 and 10/-. The profits of the match — which included a donation of £5/5/- from Lord Stanfordham, the private secretary to King George, and a donation from the former Governor-General of Australia, Lord Denman — and the proceeds from the sales of programmes eventually came to £1000, all of which went to the British and Red Cross Societies.

== Press reports ==
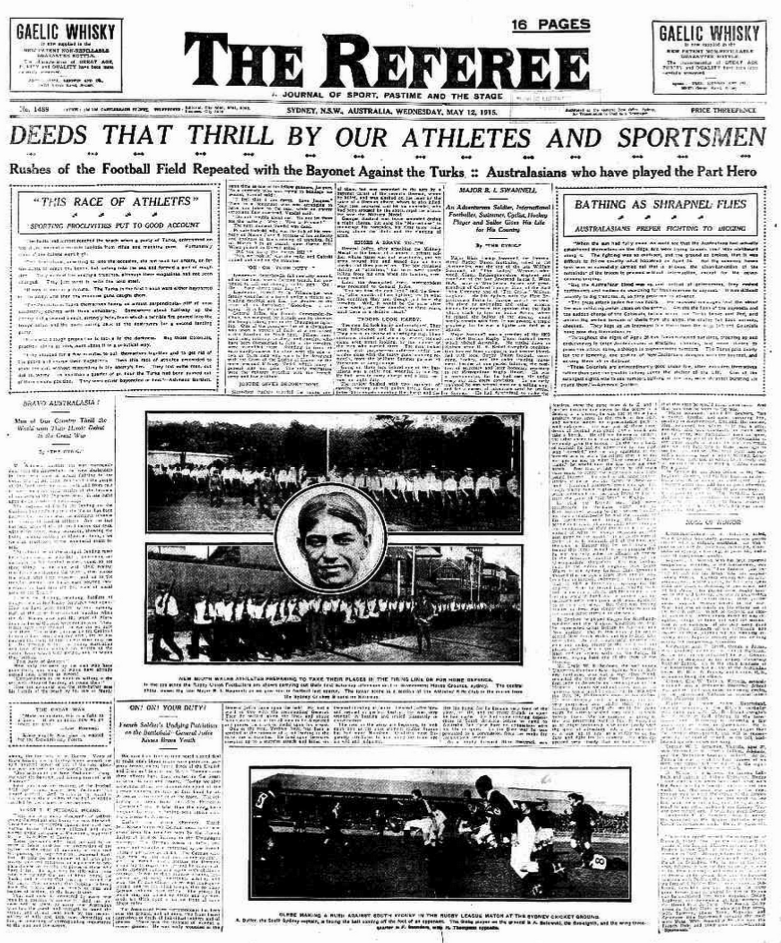
The Referee front page, 12 May 1915

Overall, the accurate, interesting, and matter-of-fact press reports of the exhibition match (collectively) provided a strong and long-overdue contrast to what Richardson usefully identifies (at 2016, p. 307) as the "misguided mythology" that was ever so firmly embedded in the questionable characterisation — echoing the widely quoted sentiments of Henry Newbolt's poem Vitaï Lampada — made early in the war, of the Australian "digger" as a fierce footballer playing on another field. See, for instance:

- The poem by George Shand (1863–1926), the Victorian lawn-tennis identity: "The Sportsmen's Brigade", at The Referee, (Wednesday, 13 January 1915), p.16.
- Ellis Ashmead-Bartlett's article "A Race of Athletes", written at Gallipoli, and reprinted at The Bendigonian, (Thursday, 13 May 1915), p.14.
- The article "Deeds that Thrill by our Athletes and Sportsmen: Rushes of the Football Field Repeated with the Bayonet Against the Turks: Australasians who have played the Part Hero ", at The Referee, (Wednesday, 12 May 1915), p.1.
- The headline references to how "Players of our National games heed Imperial Summon to Grandest Game of all—Bearing Arms", at The Referee, (Wednesday, 12 May 1915), p.16.
- The article ""Going into Battle is like Great Football Rush", says a Soldier: Invalided Home, Private Anderson tells of Colonial Sporting Grit in War", at The Referee, (Wednesday, 12 May 1915), p.16.

There were also the extraordinary claims, made in some quarters, that the footballers who had enlisted were somehow more robust and less likely to be injured than their non-footballer comrades; and Brosnan's remarks, made a year later, in relation to the manner in which the footballer's sporting background contributed to their value as a recruit, reflected similar views:

"Whether footballers or the authorities controlling the game in Victoria could not do more towards "Winning the War" than they are doing is a matter about which opinions differ, but that they have done their share in providing recruits is beyond doubt. After all, this is only what it should be. Owing to the training necessary to become an expert (and everyone aspires to be an expert), and the physical fitness and endurance required to take part in a game of football, our players should, and, from letters received, do, make the best soldiers. From all sides one hears glowing accounts of their discipline, ability to do long marches, and quickness and resource in dangers and difficulties. This is exactly what one would expect, but unfortunately these very qualities place them in positions of the greatest danger, and day by day the footballers' death roll grows until by now it assumes alarming proportions." — Gerald Brosnan, The Winner, 28 February 1917.

The match reports spoke of a hotly contested game of Australian football that was, without doubt, being enjoyed beyond measure by those who played on that special day when, just for a moment, they were elite footballers once again (albeit serving with the AIF at the time) — and, inescapably, many of whom would either die later or sustain lifelong injury, debilitating mental issues, and/or the ongoing physical sequelae of medical conditions (such as respiratory distress due to having been gassed) connected with their fight against a real enemy.

Beyond this, the match had quite a different significance for various sorts of individuals. Some treated it as just an event, others saw it as a sporting contest, many "imperial" Britons viewed it as a fascinating exhibition of an unusual and different "colonial" pastime — an obvious parallel to the (later) for-general-interest-only presentation of a demonstration sport, such as Basque pelota, at an Olympic Games — and, for most Australians, it was far more than just a social match: given the skill, experience, and background of those selected to play on the day, and the overall strength of the two teams, they afforded the match a status of at least the equal of an interstate representative game, if not an ANFC Carnival match.

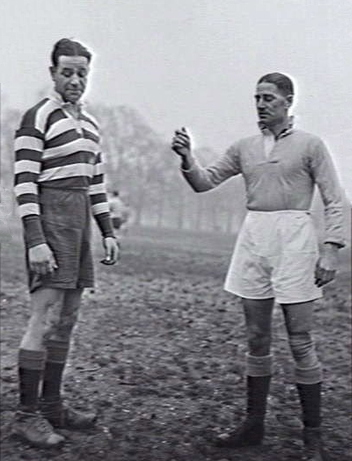
Jack Forrest and Bruce Andrew tossing the coin, Hyde Park, 8 January 1944.

The various press reports also reflected a wide range of different motivations. From one perspective (shared by Gerald Brosnan), the exhibition match of Australian football brought to mind the (abandoned) pre-war proposals by former St Kilda footballer and coach Jim Smith for a 25-match tour of the world — commencing with the Panama–Pacific International Exposition, in San Francisco, California, in March 1915 and, from thence, across America, and on to England, France and South Africa — with a squad of 45 Victorian footballers, to advertise and promote the Australian game; and, further, the 1916 match seemed to suggest the reasonable possibility of the game's successful promotion in the UK and overseas once the war was over. However, it was not until the match between the RAAF and HMAS Shropshire, at Hyde Park, London, organised by ex-Collinwood footballer and later ANFC secretary Bruce Andrew, that a second exhibition match was held in the UK. A third match, contested between RAAF HQ (captain, Bruce Andrew) and the RAAF's No.10 (Sunderland) Squadron (captain, Jack Forrest), took place, soon after, at Hyde Park on 8 January 1944.

=== The Australian press ===
In late September 1916, it was announced in the Australian press that "General Monash has granted a holiday [to his troops] for an exhibition of Australian football arranged to take place in London, early in October". A week before the match, the Australian press noted that, "Australian soldiers are introducing Australian football into Britain. Strong teams have been formed at Salisbury and London, and an exhibition game will be played in London on the 28th, when it is expected that Royalty will be present." Several days later, the press noted that, "Members of the competing teams in the Australian (football match, to be held on Saturday, are all senior players, and many have taken part in interstate matches. The captain of the third division team is Lieutenant B. Sloss, of South Melbourne, and the captain of the training groups team is Captain W.H. Perry, of Norwood (S.A.)".

Following the match, although a number of brief reports of the event were published immediately after the match, such as,

"An Australian football match was played on the Queens Club ground, London, on Saturday, between teams representing the Australian 3rd Division, and the Australian trainees at Salisbury Plain. The former won, scoring 6 goals 16 behinds to 4 goals 12 behinds",

the small number that did provide a match report, only supplied (at the most) a two paragraph description of the match itself, and failed to supply any detailed list of participants.

In his own brief report for The Winner on the match in the week following the match (1 November 1916), which was, to a considerable extent, embellished by the pre-match correspondence he had already received relating to the match's participants, Gerald Brosnan lamented the lack of relevant information in the cable reports, and observed that "[further] details by mail will be anxiously awaited".

Ten weeks later (20 December 1916), Brosnan's second article not only contained a detailed first-person account of the events of the day from The Winner's London-based correspondent, E.A. Bland, but, also, Bland's description of first-time spectators' impressions of Australian football. Observing that, notwithstanding the significant fact "that these were scratch teams which had few chances of getting together", the presence of "such a galaxy of stars" meant that "the individual play was at times brilliant and spectacular", and recording that he, Bland, as a first-time spectator, came away from the match with the strong impression that the game "was faster than either Soccer or Rugger", he also reported that "the "high marking" which seemed to be the feature of the game which attracted most [spectator] attention was extraordinarily good". Brosnan's article, which supplied a photograph of each team (i.e., [ADP.3], and [TUP.3]), also included extensive extracts taken directly from the four major British sporting papers, Sporting Life, The Sportsman, The Times, and The Weekly Despatch.

In his final article on the match (10 January 1917), published three weeks later, and unique in the level of match detail it contained (it also published three photographs taken at the game), Brosnan explained that "later details of the match, contained in letters from players, and from spectators, have since arrived, and will no doubt prove of interest to the great number of football followers as well as to the general body of sports-loving public here".

=== The New Zealand press ===
The reports that appeared in the New Zealand press took the form of brief, simple news items.

=== The British press ===
Although number of brief excerpts from the reports in Sporting Life, 'The Sportsman, The Times, and The Weekly Despatch were published from time to time in the Australian press — i.e., rather than being offered as sports reports of the match, they were presented as examples of the amusing British descriptions of Australian football — it seems that Brosnan's second (20 December 1916) article was the only place at which the relevant sections of all four of the British articles were published in the Australian press. The contents of an entirely different fifth article (apparently written on 29 October 1916), taken from The Referee of London, was published in The (Emerald Hill) Record of 6 January 1917.

The British reports concentrated on the match as an event, rather than a contest; and were, thus, devoid of the normal sorts of descriptions of the patterns of play, the performance of prominent individuals, particular match incidents, and the progression of the scores.

With the reasonable intention of providing their British readers with some sense of the experience they had missed in person, the reports described the similarities and differences between the Australian game and those their readers already knew: rugby union, rugby league, and soccer — the pitch upon with it was played, the layout of its goal-posts, its requisite skills, its rules, its scores, its four quarters, the standard player positions, the level of athleticism demanded of its players, etc.

Consequently, they tended to focus on the absence of the "off-side" rule, kicking long drop-kicks, and kicking long and accurate place-kicks. Also, unique features of the game, such as the stab-kick, high marks, bouncing the ball on the run, and being able to kick in any direction were stressed: and, in particular, the (to the British) extraordinary spectator practice, displayed on the day to some considerable extent by the Australians present: that of barracking.

"Those who had the good fortune to witness the match will be in agreement that it is a most exhilarating and exciting pastime, and it is played at such a pace throughout that it is unquestionably the fastest outdoor game, with the exception of lacrosse. With eighteen players on each side, each watched by an opponent, the chances for open, speedy exchanges would appear to be limited, but in practice the reverse is the case, for with no offside for players to worry about, with a ground width of some 120 yards, affording plenty of scope for manœuvring, with free kicks taken without a moment's time being wasted, with players permitted to run ten yards with the ball before bouncing it, and then bouncing it while going at full speed, with the right to knock-off, punt, or drop-kick in any direction, and without scrums, and the whistle seldom being heard, it will be understood that the Australian code lends itself to speed work. . . .
The ball, it should be mentioned, is slightly larger than the Rugby ball, but similar in shape, with the ends more flattened. Some of the players showed wonderful control, in their punches, and also in their kicking, but more noticeable, perhaps, than either was the high marking, players leaping in the air to make a fair catch from a pass, and this entitled them to a kick in any direction. Then, again, some of the long kicking to players on the same side was wonderfully accurate, while the pace at which the ball travelled about the field was at times almost bewildering."
Sporting Life, reprinted in The Winner of 20 December 1916.
"Long kicking and marking are two of the distinctive features. When the ball is caught from a clean kick of over ten yards the player is entitled to a free kick in any direction. If the angle is favorable he tries to drop or punt a goal, but if badly placed he endeavors to kick to a fellow player. There is much keen competition in jumping in the air to make a catch, and in this phase are very expert. The game is very fast, very open, very spectacular, and needs plenty of stamina and pace. The ruck men and rovers are required to be up and doing all the time, and on account of the strain they are changed and given fixed positions every quarter. There is also plenty of work for the field umpire who requires to be very quick to keep up with the play.
The Sportsman, reprinted in The Winner of 20 December 1916.
"One thing that is clearly apparent is the enormous amount of skill which is required, while physical fitness is also essential. There can be no doubt of it being a game of high value from an athletic point of view. As a spectacle, much can be said in its favor, for the fluctuations are rapid, brought about by the nimbleness, versatility, and dexterity of the players. . . . Pace is an important essential, but a still greater feature is high marking and long kicking. It is no unusual thing for several players to spring between 4ft. and 5ft. in the air to catch the ball from a kick over ten yards, which constitutes a mark and entitles the successful player to a free kick. Drop-kicking and place kicking are further salient points, and these reach a remarkably high standard for accuracy and length. There is great art in bouncing the ball while travelling at full speed, and also the stab jack passing, which is tantamount to short passing methods in the Association game [viz., soccer]."
The Referee of London, reprinted in The (Emerald Hill) Record of 6 January 1917.
"Football — Australian fashion — drew a big crowd to Queen's Club yesterday afternoon, when a team chosen from the Third Division beat the representatives of the Combined Training Groups by 52 points to 36.
It was the first time that the fast Australian game had ever been played by skilled exponents in London, and the onlookers could be readily grouped in two classes.
There were the partisans in slouched bats over hard-bitten Anzac faces, who had come to "barrack" for or against the "Fighting Third", the only Anzac Division which has not yet seen active service.
There were also curious sportsmen and sportswomen of all kinds, who had come out to get a glimpse of the game of which so much has been written here at one time and another. . . .
The section of the spectators unfamiliar with the Australian game agreed that it was fast rather than exciting, and had more admiration for the splendid condition of the men, their untiring energy through a long and trying game, and the huge drop kicks, of which they all seemed capable, than for the game itself as a rival to Rugby."
Weekly Despatch, reprinted in The Winner of 20 December 1916.
The spectators were also treated to their first exhibition of Australian "barracking". This barracking is a cheerful running comment, absolutely without prejudice, on the players, the spectators, the referee, the line umpires, and lastly the game itself. On Saturday it was mostly concerned with references to the military history of the teams engaged. When a catch was missed, for instance, a shrill and penetrating voice inquired of the abashed player "D'you think it's a bomb? It's not, it's a ball." On one side there was a colonel playing among the backs and the captain of the other side was a chaplain, and a popular one, to judge by the cheery advice that he got from the privates on the line and in the stand."
The Times of London, reprinted in The Winner of 20 December 1916.

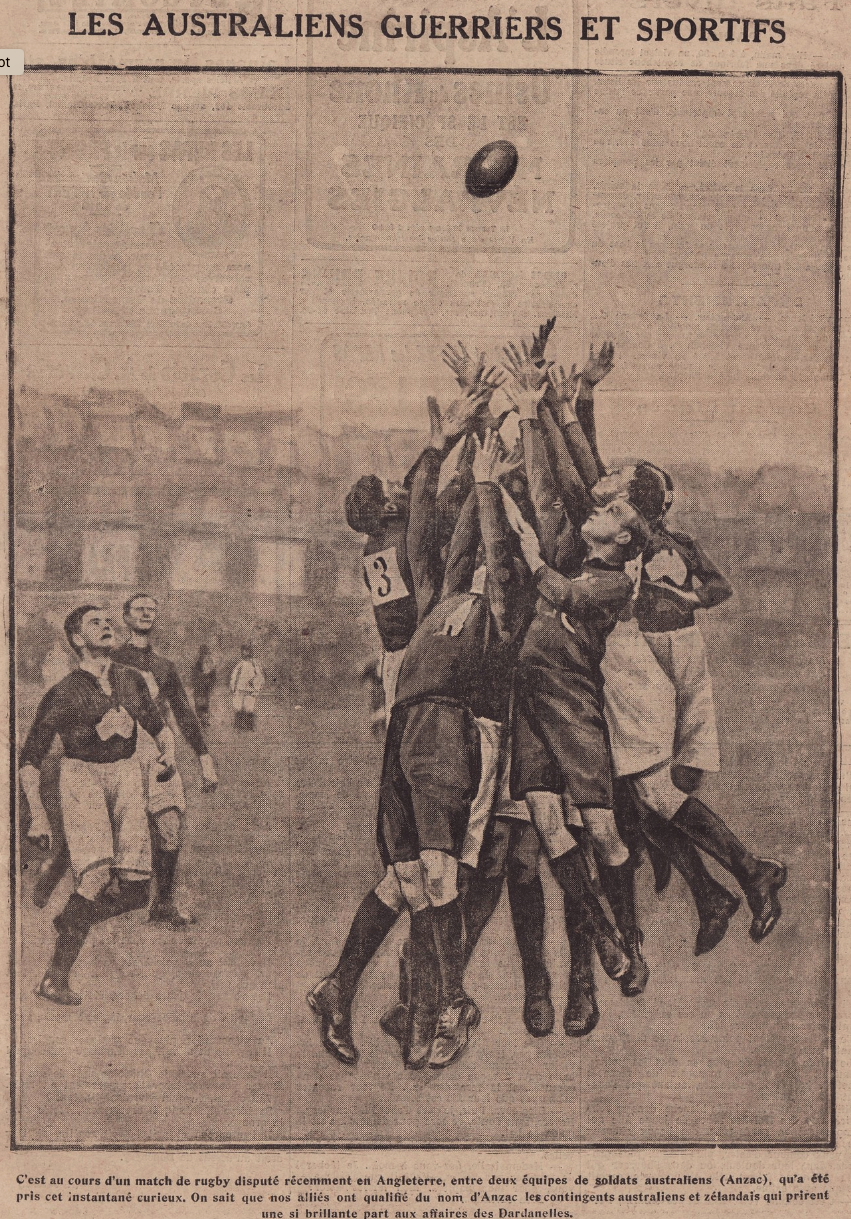
Australian Warriors and Sportsmen. (From Excelsior, 20 November 1916.)

=== The American press ===
On 19 November 1916, the New York Times published a photograph, taken during the match, of a large pack of players contesting for a mark.

=== The French press ===
On 20 November 1916 the French newspaper, "The Excelsior", published a version of a photograph (a different photograph from that published in the New York Times) that had been taken during the match of a large pack of players contesting for a mark, under the title "Les Australiens guerriers et sportifs" ('The Australian Warriors and Sportsmen').

== Records of the day ==
=== News film ===
A film ([NR.1]) was taken at the match. A remastered and colourised version ([NR.2]) of the original film was released in 2019.

=== Team photographs ===
Two official photographs were taken of each team prior to the match by the same photographer.

- Third Divisional Team
  - [ADP.1]: In the collection of the Australian War Memorial.
  - [ADP.2]: In the collection of the Australian Sports Museum (reprinted at [ADP.3] and [ADP.4]).
- Training Units Team
  - [TUP.1]: In the collection of the Australian War Memorial.
  - [TUP.2]: In the collection of the Australian Sports Museum (reprinted at [TUP.3]).

== Frank Beaurepaire's presentation set of team photographs ==
In celebration of the match, Frank Beaurepaire commissioned a souvenir set of the team photographs — displaying [TUP.2] and [ADP.2] — which he donated to the Collingwood football Club; and, as of June 2022, there is no evidence that any other football club received a similar souvenir set of photographs from Beaurepaire.

"Writing from the Y.M.C.A.'s quarters at 21 Bartholomew road, London, to Mr E. Copeland, secretary of Collingwood F.C., Frank Beaurepaire says: "Knowing of the fine collection of football and other photos, trophies, etc., that you have at Victoria Park, and being reminded of [same] by association here, with Dan Minogue, I thought you would like to have copies of the teams which recently played in London on 28/10/16, for Red Cross. It was, as you are probably aware, a pioneer game of first class Australian football, and went off well indeed. Crowd 4000 to 5000, Profit £260 or so. I had the honor of suggesting the game, and arranging much of the detail, particularly in the early stages. You will see me seated in uniform next to Dan Minogue, Vice-Captain, and Bruce Sloss, Captain. Third Division won by 6 goals 16 behinds, to 4 goals 12 behinds. If Dan has not sent you a souvenir programme so that you may list the names I shall have, I hope, the pleasure of doing so, on my return to Australia in the distant future, all going well . . ." – The Winner, 31 January 1917.

The mounting boards of the souvenir sets were decorated with a British Union Jack and an Australian Red Ensign, with "Australian Football in London. Pioneer Exhibition Game. At Queen's Club, West Kensington. Saturday 28 Oct. 1916" at their head, and "Organizer of Match & Donor of Photos to Club Lieut. Frank Beaurepaire" at their feet. They were mounted especially for presentation by the Allan Studio, of 318 Smith Street, Collingwood.

== Centenary match (2017) ==
On Saturday, 6 May 2017, at West London's Chiswick Rugby Club, the 1916 Pioneer match was commemorated, when the two 2016 AFL London Grand Final teams — West London Wildcats (premiers) and Wandsworth Demons (runners-up) — played each other in the opening round of the 2017 competition; with the West London Wildcats wearing navy blue guernseys featuring a large white map of Australia (with Tasmania included), and the Wandsworth Demons wearing red guernseys featuring a large white kangaroo.

== See also ==
- 1916 VFL season – 20th season of the Victorian Football League (VFL)
- Australian rules football exhibition matches
- List of Victorian Football League players who died on active service
- Australian rules football during the World Wars
