= Phil Hosking =

Australian rules footballer

Personal information
- Full name: Thornton Randall Philip Hosking
- Born: 4 May 1894; Albert Park, Victoria
- Died: 6 August 1949 (aged 55); Caulfield South, Victoria
- Height: 179 cm (5 ft 10 in)
- Weight: 68 kg (150 lb)

Playing career^{1}
Years	Club	Games (Goals)
1913	Melbourne	1 (0)
- ^{1} Playing statistics correct to the end of 1913.

Career highlights
- AIF Pioneer Exhibition Game, London, 28 October 1916

Thornton Randall Philip Hosking (4 May 1894 – 6 August 1949) was an Australian rules footballer who played with Melbourne in the Victorian Football League (VFL).

== Family ==
The son of John Andrew Hosking (1860-1936), and Sarah Letitia Hosking (1863-1928), née Pearson, Thornton Randall Philip Hosking was born at Albert Park, Victoria on 4 May 1894.

Two of his brothers, Albert Jeffrey Hosking (1885-1953), and John Bruce "Jack" Hosking (1898-1917), also served in the AIF. Jack died of the wounds he received in action, in France, on 22 July 1917.

He married Ettie Ruby Meade Menere (1891-1956), later Mrs. Bruce Duane, on 13 August 1913. They had one son. Following a divorce, he married Mona Gwenn Bromley Lloyd (1903-1984), later Mrs. Charles Trevor Turner, in 1939.

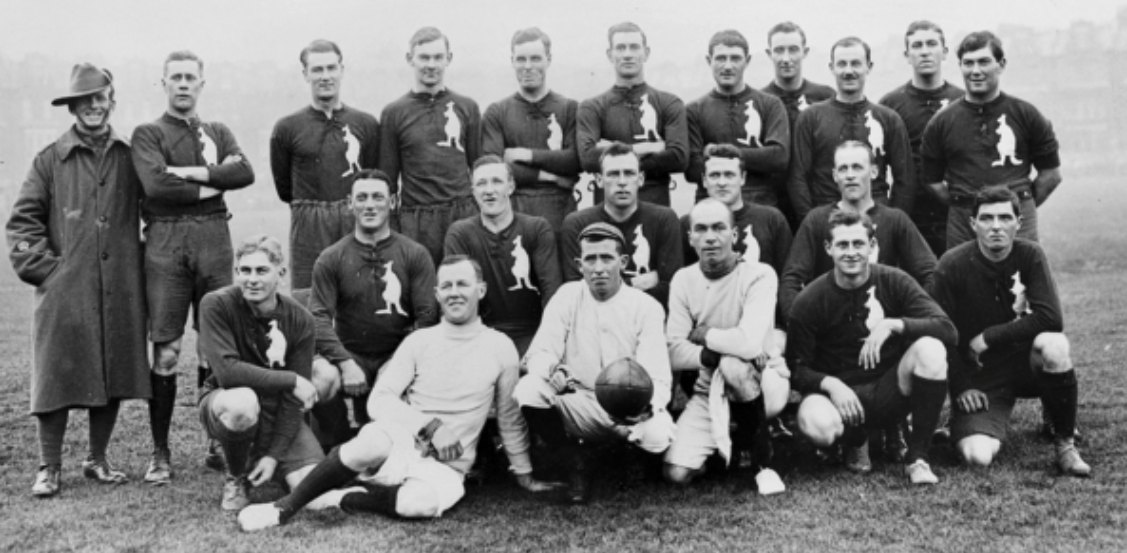
The Australian Training Units Team: 28 October 1916. Phil Hosking is the third man (second player) from the left, in the back row.

== Football ==
Recruited from South Yarra, he played of First XVIII for Melbourne, against Collingwood, at the MCG, on 26 April 1913.

== Military service ==
He served overseas with the First AIF: and, while in England, took part in the Pioneer Exhibition Game, at Queen's Club, West Kensington, on 28 October 1916.

== Death ==
He died at his residence in South Caulfield on 6 August 1949.

== See also ==
- 1916 Pioneer Exhibition Game
