= Sinton Hewitt =

Australian long-distance runner

Personal information
- Nationality: Australian
- Born: Thomas Sinton Hewitt; 31 July 1887 St Kilda, Victoria, Australia
- Died: 6 October 1976 (aged 89) Geelong, Victoria, Australia

Sport
- Sport: Long-distance running
- Events: Marathon, 10,000m

Thomas Sinton Hewitt (31 July 1887 – 6 October 1976) was an Australian long-distance runner.

== Athlete ==
He was the (pre-war) captain of the Malvern Harriers Athletic Club (and also, from this, a club-mate of Percy Cerutty), and a well-performed long distance runner. He represented Australia, running under the name of "Sinton Hewitt", in both the marathon (finishing 30th, in 3h 3m 27s) and the 10,000 metres (finishing tenth in his heat, time unknown) at the 1920 Olympic Games in Antwerp, Belgium.

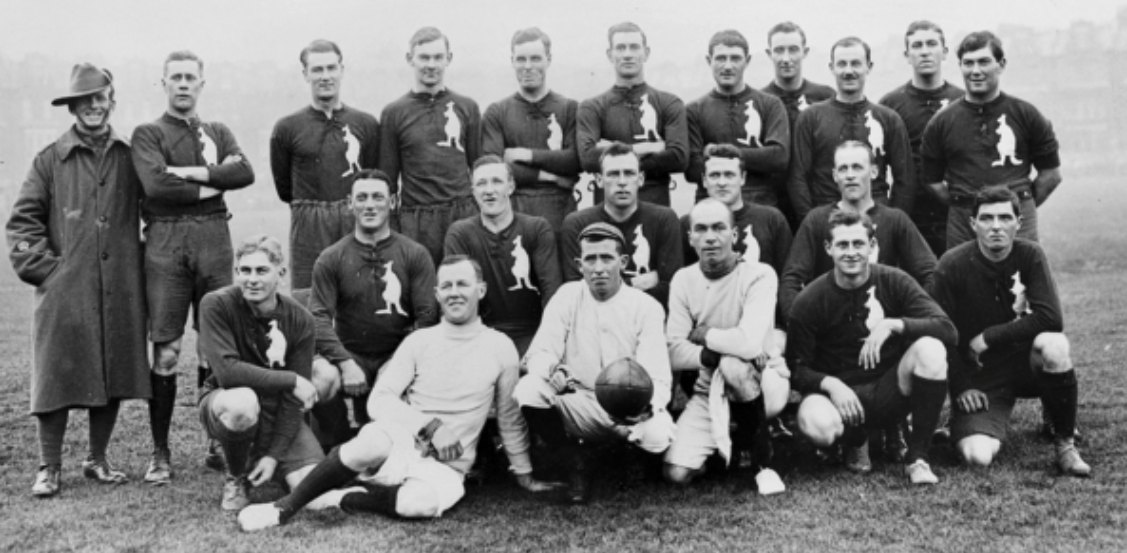
The Australian Training Units Team: 28 October 1916 (H.16688). Hewitt is third umpire (extreme right) in front row.

== Boundary umpire ==
He was a boundary umpire at the "Pioneer Exhibition Game" of Australian Rules football in London (1916). A news film was taken at the match.

== See also ==
- 1916 Pioneer Exhibition Game
