= Harold Bower =

Australian rules footballer

Personal information
- Full name: Harold Carlyle Bower
- Born: 5 May 1878; South Melbourne, Victoria
- Died: 22 May 1954 (aged 76); Albert Park, Victoria

Playing career^{1}
Years	Club	Games (Goals)
1901–02	South Melbourne	13 (0)
- ^{1} Playing statistics correct to the end of 1902.

Harold Carlyle Bower (5 May 1878 – 22 May 1954) was an Australian rules footballer who played with South Melbourne in the Victorian Football League.
