= 1983 SANFL Grand Final =

West Adelaide	Sturt
21.16 (142)	16.12 (108)
	1	2	3	4
WA	2.4 (16)	12.7 (79)	15.10 (100)	21.16 (142)
STU	3.4 (22)	7.7 (49)	12.11 (83)	16.12 (108)
- Date: Saturday, 1 October (2:10 pm)
- Stadium: Football Park
- Attendance: 47,129
- Umpires: Laurie Argent, Rick Kinnear
- Coin toss won by: Sturt
- Kicked toward: Golf Course (southern)

Ceremonies
- Pre-match entertainment: Jackie Love

Accolades
- Jack Oatey Medallist: Ian Borchard (WA)

Broadcast in Australia
- Network: Seven
- Commentators: Bruce McAvaney, Robert Oatey, Ian Day, Peter Marker

The 1983 SANFL Grand Final was an Australian rules football competition. West Adelaide beat Sturt 142 to 108.

== Teams ==
West Adelaide
B:	John Kantilaftas	Tony Burgess	Peter Winter
HB:	Larry Watson	Mark Dreher	Greg Summerton
C:	Robin McKinnon	Richard Hamilton	Randall Bennett
HF:	Mike Smith	Bruce Lindner	Geoff Morris (vc)
F:	Craig Williams	Roger Luders	Leon Grosser
Foll:	Dirk de Jong	Ian Borchard (c)	Bernie Conlen
Int:	Grantley Fielke	Peter Meuret	
Coach:	Neil Kerley		

== Scorecard ==
1983 SANFL Grand Final
Saturday, 1 October (2:10 pm)	West Adelaide	def.	Sturt	Football Park (crowd: 47,129)
2.4 (16); 12.7 (79); 15.10 (100); 21.16 (142)	Q1; Q2; Q3; Final	3.4 (22); 7.7 (49); 12.11 (83); 16.12 (108)	Umpires: Argent, Kinnear; Jack Oatey Medal: Ian Borchard (West Adelaide); Television broadcast: Seven
5: Lindner; 4: Luders, Grosser; 3: Meuret; 2: Morris; 1: Conlen, Smith, Borchard	Goals	4: Graham; 2: Davies, Motley
Borchard, Morris, Bennett, Meuret, Grosser	Best	Graham, Motley, Howard
This was West Adelaide's first premiership since 1961. They would not win another until 2015
