= Conlen =

Conlen may refer to:

- Bernie Conlen (born 1960), Australian rules footballer
- Conlen, Texas, an unincorporated community in Dallam County, Texas
