= 1931 SANFL season =

South Australian National Football League season

- Teams: 8
- Premiers: North Adelaide; 6th premiership
- Minor premiers: Port Adelaide; 15th minor premiership
- Magarey Medallist: Jack Sexton; West Adelaide
- Ken Farmer Medallist: Ken Farmer; North Adelaide (126 Goals)
- Matches played: 72
- Highest: 34,202 (Grand Final, North Adelaide vs. Sturt)

The 1931 South Australian National Football League season was the 52nd season of the top-level Australian rules football competition in South Australia.

== Ladder ==
1931 SANFL Ladder
| Pos | Team | Pld | W | L | D | PF | PA | PP | Pts |
|---|---|---|---|---|---|---|---|---|---|
| 1 | Port Adelaide | 17 | 14 | 3 | 0 | 1446 | 1138 | 55.96 | 28 |
| 2 | Sturt | 17 | 14 | 3 | 0 | 1562 | 1232 | 55.91 | 28 |
| 3 | North Adelaide (P) | 17 | 11 | 6 | 0 | 1677 | 1273 | 56.85 | 22 |
| 4 | Norwood | 17 | 9 | 8 | 0 | 1456 | 1576 | 48.02 | 18 |
| 5 | West Torrens | 17 | 7 | 10 | 0 | 1368 | 1442 | 48.68 | 14 |
| 6 | Glenelg | 17 | 7 | 10 | 0 | 1410 | 1596 | 46.91 | 14 |
| 7 | South Adelaide | 17 | 4 | 13 | 0 | 1241 | 1438 | 46.32 | 8 |
| 8 | West Adelaide | 15 | 2 | 13 | 0 | 1189 | 1654 | 41.82 | 4 |

Rules for classification: 1) points; 2) percentage; 3) number of points for.
(P) Premiers

== Finals series ==
=== Grand Final ===
1931 SANFL Grand Final
Saturday, 3 October | North Adelaide | def. | Sturt | Adelaide Oval (crowd: 34,202)
4.3 (27); 8.7 (55); 12.9 (81); 17.13 (115) | Q1; Q2; Q3; Final | 2.4 (16); 5.6 (36); 10.8 (68); 11.11 (77)
