= Bert Johnson (Australian footballer) =

Australian rules footballer (1939–2026)

Personal information
- Full name: Bertram Harold Johnson
- Born: 8 June 1939
- Died: 24 September 2026 (aged 87)
- Height: 170 cm (5 ft 7 in)
- Weight: 71 kg (157 lb)
- Position: Wingman

Playing career^{1}
Years	Club	Games (Goals)
1957–1964	West Adelaide	87 (36)
1965–1968	North Melbourne	31 (5)
- ^{1} Playing statistics correct to the end of 1968.

Career highlights
- West Adelaide premiership player: 1961; South Australia interstate representative: 1964; North Melbourne best first-year player: 1965

Bertram Harold Johnson (8 June 1939 – 24 September 2026) was an Australian rules footballer who played with West Adelaide in the South Australian National Football League (SANFL) and North Melbourne in the Victorian Football League (VFL).

== Career ==
Johnson, an Indigenous Australian from the Nepabunna Mission in rural South Australia, has been described as one of the most exciting footballers of his generation. He played mostly on the wing, but was also a capable centreman.

After Johnson came to Adelaide he was taken by West Adelaide player Doug Thomas for a trial with the club and made his SANFL debut in the 1957 season. On a wing in West Adelaide's 1961 Grand Final winning team, Johnson was the first indigenous footballer to play in a SANFL premiership. He represented South Australia at interstate football in 1964.

He was cleared to North Melbourne just in time for the opening round of the 1965 VFL season and was rated his side's best player in what The Age described as a "brilliant debut". Soon becoming a fan-favourite, Johnson made 16 appearances for North Melbourne in 1965. He won the club's best first-year player award and Channel 9 named him VFL Recruit of the Year.

Early in the 1966 VFL season he spoke to the media expressing his unhappiness after being dropped from the team and threatened to request a clearance back to South Australia. In round three he had been omitted from the team to play St Kilda, but was a last minute inclusion when wingman Laurie Dwyer had to withdraw with injury. These comments led to him being disciplined and cost him his spot in the side until round seven. He ended up playing 10 games for the season.

Johnson made only two senior appearances for North Melbourne in the 1967 season. He was one of North Melbourne's best players in the 1967 reserves grand final win over Richmond.

He played three further VFL games in 1968, then finished his career in the Victorian Football Association, at Williamstown and later Dandenong.

== Death ==
Johnson died on 24 September 2026, at the age of 87.
