= Brian Faehse =

Australian rules footballer (1924–2021)

Personal information
- Full name: Brian Keith Faehse
- Nickname: Iron Man
- Born: 8 October 1924; Cummins, South Australia
- Died: 21 March 2021 (aged 96)
- Height: 182 cm (6 ft 0 in)
- Weight: 76 kg (168 lb)
- Positions: Centre half-back, Ruckman

Playing career^{1}
Years	Club	Games (Goals)
1944–56	West Adelaide	222 (60)

Coaching career
Years	Club	Games (W–L–D)
1951–52	West Adelaide	35 (14–21–0)
- ^{1} Playing statistics correct to the end of 1956.

Career highlights
- SANFL debut with West Adelaide-Glenelg on 27 May 1944; West Adelaide Premiership Player 1947; West Adelaide Best & Fairest 1950, 1951; West Adelaide Captain 1951-56; West Adelaide Captain-Coach 1951-52; 19 State games for South Australia (1948-56); West Adelaide Football Club Life Member 1949; SANFL Player Life Member; SANFL League Tribunal Commissioner 1964-78; South Australian Football Hall of Fame Inaugural inductee 2002; West Adelaide Football Club Hall of Fame Inaugural Inductee 2005; Official Legend of the West Adelaide Football Club 2011

Brian Keith Faehse (8 October 1924 – 21 March 2021) was an Australian rules football player who played his league career with West Adelaide in the South Australian National Football League (SANFL) between 1944 and 1956. He was born in Cummins, South Australia. Fos Williams, who played alongside Faehse at West Adelaide, and against him with Port Adelaide, stated that "I've never met a better team mate or a more ferocious and determined opponent".

== Playing career ==
Faehse made his league debut with the wartime West Adelaide-Glenelg combination on 27 May 1944, initially in the Ruck. A last minute inclusion in the side, Faehse kicked four goals in his first game. He would go on to play seven more games before a broken ankle put him out for the season, the longest layoff throughout his football career.

After attending Prince Alfred College and with World War II coming to an end in 1945 West Adelaide and Glenelg both resumed as separate clubs, with Faehse remaining with The Bloods being a member of Wests Colts in 1943 and beginning an apprenticeship as an electrical engineer. He continually played in the ruck despite being just over six feet tall and weighing 12½ stone. After being overheard by coach Harry Lee complaining about playing in the ruck he was moved to Centre half-back, becoming the best player of the position in South Australia which saw him represent South Australia on 19 occasions between 1948 and 1956.

Faehse was a member of West Adelaide's 1947 premiership side which defeated Norwood 10.15 (75) to 5.15 (45) in front of just over 32,000 fans. It would be the only time in three Grand Final appearances that he would come away with the SANFL premiership. He was appointed West Adelaide Captain-Coach in 1950 by the club committee, but that committee was ousted and the new leaders installed Jack Broadstock into the position instead, with the club paying Faehse the sum of A£60 for his trouble. At this time he considered asking the club for a clearance to play for neighboring West Torrens but decided to stay with West. Despite the off field dramas, Faehse had a supreme year in 1950 winning the first of two Best & Fairest awards with the club (the award, currently known as the "Neil Kerley Medal", was known at the time as the "Trabilsie Medal").

Faehse was appointed Captain-Coach of West again in 1951 and held the position for two seasons, compiling a 14-21 record. In 1951 he repeated as club Best & Fairest. After taking the club to sixth and missing the finals in both seasons he was replaced as coach of the side in 1953 by Laurie Cahill (uncle of future multiple Port Adelaide premiership player and coach and 1985-87 Wests coach John Cahill), but remained captain of the side until his retirement in 1956.

Faehse was involved in an incident with Port Adelaide player Dave Boyd just before half-time of the 1954 SANFL Grand Final. He had flattened Boyd with what umpire Ken Aplin considered to be a fair bump. However, Port fans in the Sir Edwin Smith Stand at the Adelaide Oval didn't like what happened to their player and set upon the West Adelaide players as they made their way through the crowd to the dressing room with punches and kicks, with some players and officials reportedly not making it to the rooms until it was time to return to the ground for the second half. West, who had been leading at half time, were overrun by Port Adelaide in the second half of the match.

The incident prompted the construction of new changerooms underneath the George Giffen Stand over the summer of 1954-55. With the entrance to the rooms now located in the south-western corner of the oval forming part of the boundary fence, players no longer had to go through the crowd to get to the rooms (until the building of the new rooms, football players used the same dressing rooms as the cricket players. The only way to get to the original rooms from the ground was through the members pavilion in the Sir Edwin Smith Stand). Faehse was given the honor of being the first player to use the tunnel when as captain he led West onto the field for a game against Norwood in 1955. Faehse retired from league football after the 1956 Grand Final loss to Port Adelaide having played 222 games, including 128 consecutive games earning him the nickname Iron Man, and kicking 60 goals for the club over 13 seasons. His total games was then a club record for West Adelaide.

== Representative football ==
Faehse represented South Australia with distinction 19 times between 1948 and 1956 and played in the 1950 (Brisbane), 1953 (Adelaide) and 1956 (Perth) Australian National Football Carnivals.

== Off field ==
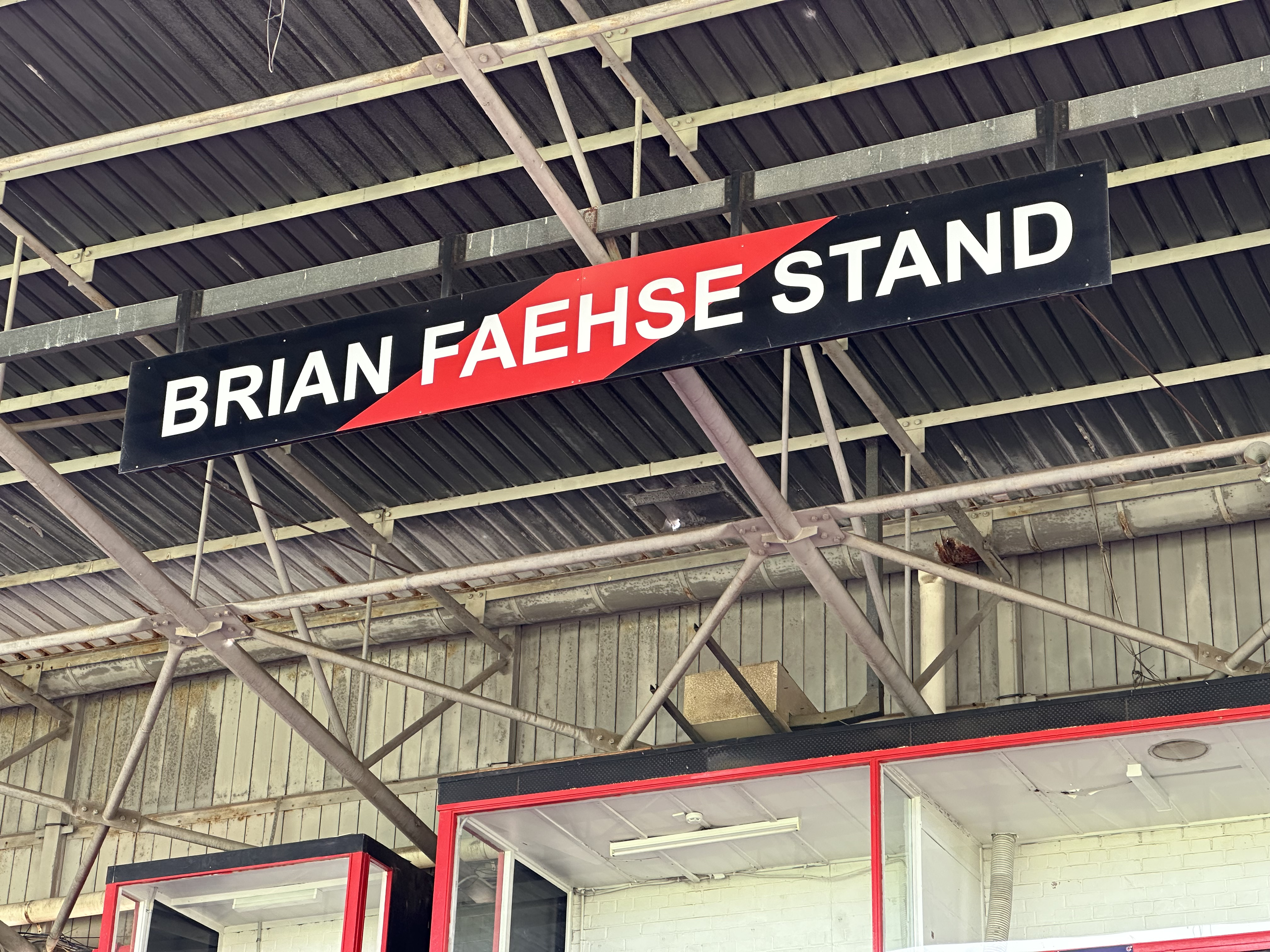
The Brian Faaehse Stand at Richmond Oval

Faehse was a players' representative on the club's management committee from 1948 to 1955 and after retiring in 1956 was elected to the club's board by its members in 1958. He was also one of the prime movers to get West Adelaide their own home ground and was a member of the sub-committee which negotiated the lease of the land that is now the club's home ground (Richmond Oval) from the West Torrens Council. He organised the plan of the oval and arranged the original earthmoving, clearing and levelling of the site.

The 1,500 seat grandstand at Richmond Oval, of which Faehse was one of the organisers and planners, was named the B.K. Faehse Stand in the 2000s in honor of his services to the West Adelaide Football Club. Faehse was appointed to the position of SANFL Tribunal Commissioner in 1964 and held the position for 15 years and was an inaugural inductee into the South Australian Football Hall of Fame in 2002. He was also an inaugural inductee into the West Adelaide Hall of Fame in 2005 and was elevated to Legend status in 2011 alongside the club's only other official legend, former teammate Neil Kerley.
