= 1939 SANFL season =

- Teams: 8
- Premiers: Port Adelaide; 13th premiership
- Minor premiers: Port Adelaide; 19th minor premiership
- Magarey Medallist: Jeff Pash; North Adelaide (16 votes); Ray McArthur; West Adelaide (16 votes)
- Ken Farmer Medallist: Ken Farmer; North Adelaide (113 Goals)
- Matches played: 72
- Highest: 44,885 (Grand Final, Port Adelaide vs. West Torrens)

The 1939 South Australian National Football League season was the 60th season of the top-level Australian rules football competition in South Australia.

== Ladder ==
1939 SANFL Ladder
Pos	Team	Pld	W	L	D	PF	PA	PP	Pts
1	Port Adelaide (P)	17	13	4	0	1939	1536	55.80	26
2	South Adelaide	17	12	5	0	2135	1775	54.60	24
3	Norwood	17	11	6	0	1866	1835	50.42	22
4	West Torrens	17	10	7	0	1673	1815	47.96	20
5	North Adelaide	17	9	8	0	1865	1732	51.85	18
6	Sturt	17	6	11	0	1805	1914	48.53	12
7	West Adelaide	17	5	12	0	1594	1769	47.40	10
8	Glenelg	17	2	15	0	1720	2221	43.64	4

Rules for classification: 1) points; 2) percentage; 3) number of points for.
(P) Premiers

== Finals series ==
=== Grand Final ===
1939 SANFL Grand Final
Saturday, 30 September	Port Adelaide	def.	West Torrens	Adelaide Oval (crowd: 44,885)
2.11 (23); 8.18 (66); 14.23 (107); 16.28 (124)	Q1; Q2; Q3; Final	1.0 (6); 5.1 (31); 7.5 (47); 11.11 (77)
