= 1957 SANFL season =

- Teams: 8
- Premiers: Port Adelaide; 18th premiership
- Minor premiers: Port Adelaide; 27th minor premiership
- Magarey Medallist: Ron Benton; West Adelaide; Jim Deane; South Adelaide
- Ken Farmer Medallist: Peter Phipps; West Adelaide (90 Goals)

Attendance
- Matches played: 76
- Total attendance: 849,369 (11,176 per match)
- Highest: 61,924 (Grand Final, Port Adelaide vs. Norwood)

The 1957 South Australian National Football League season was the 78th season of the top-level Australian rules football competition in South Australia.

== Ladder ==
1957 SANFL ladder
Pos	Team	Pld	W	L	D	PF	PA	PP	Pts
1	Port Adelaide (P)	18	15	2	1	2152	1267	62.94	31
2	West Adelaide	18	12	6	0	1790	1506	54.31	24
3	West Torrens	18	11	6	1	1517	1474	50.72	23
4	Norwood	18	11	7	0	1681	1628	50.80	22
5	Sturt	18	8	10	0	1576	1652	48.82	16
6	North Adelaide	18	6	12	0	1355	1523	47.08	12
7	Glenelg	18	6	12	0	1421	1744	44.90	12
8	South Adelaide	18	2	16	0	1335	2033	39.64	4

Rules for classification: 1) points; 2) percentage; 3) number of points for
(P) Premiers

== Finals series ==
=== Grand Final ===
1957 SANFL Grand Final
Saturday 28 September (2:10 pm)	Port Adelaide	def.	Norwood	Adelaide Oval (crowd: 58,924)	Report
2.5 (17); 7.8 (50); 10.12 (72); 15.15 (105)	Q1; Q2; Q3; Final	4.5 (29); 9.9 (63); 11.12 (78); 13.16 (94)
