= Bruce McGregor =

Australian rules footballer

Personal information
- Full name: Harry Bruce McGregor
- Born: 7 January 1903; Broken Hill, New South Wales
- Died: 21 March 1990 (aged 87); South Australia
- Original team: West Broken Hill (Broken Hill Football League)
- Height: 6 ft 2 in (188 cm)
- Weight: 12 st 2 lb (77 kg)
- Positions: Ruckman, centre half-forward

Playing career^{1}
Years	Club	Games (Goals)
1919–1922	West Broken Hill (BHFL)	?
1923–29	West Adelaide (SANFL)	102 (173)
1931	North Hobart (TFL)	? (?)
1932	South Adelaide (SANFL)	2 (0)

Coaching career
Years	Club	Games (W–L–D)
1926–29, 1937–39, 1941	West Adelaide (SAFL/SANFL)	142 (74–68–0)
1930, 1932	South Adelaide (SANFL)	34 (8–25–1)
1931	North Hobart (TFL)	? (?)
1933–35	Glenelg (SANFL)	54 (22–31–1)
- ^{1} Playing statistics correct to the end of 1932.

Career highlights
- Broken Hill Football League Hurley Medallist 1922; SAFL debut with West Adelaide on 5 May 1923; West Adelaide Best All-Round Player 1924–27; West Adelaide captain-coach 1926–29; SANFL Magarey Medallist 1926, 1927; West Adelaide Premiership captain-coach 1927; TFL debut with North Hobart in 1931; North Hobart captain-coach 1931; South Adelaide captain-coach 1932 (two games); Glenelg Premiership coach 1934; 22 State games for South Australia 1923–29 (captain 1927–29); West Adelaide Football Club life member 1937; South Australian Football Hall of Fame inaugural inductee, 2002; West Adelaide Football Club Hall of Fame inaugural inductee, 2005

Harry Bruce McGregor (7 January 1903 in Broken Hill, New South Wales – 21 March 1990) was an Australian rules footballer who played with West Adelaide and South Adelaide in the South Australian National Football League (SANFL). His son Ken also played for West Adelaide and was a successful tennis player. Ken McGregor, a former Crows player, is not related.

== Career ==
McGregor made his debut at the age of 16 for West Broken Hill in the Broken Hill Football League, where he was a Hurley Medallist in 1922. McGregor was recruited by West Adelaide in 1923 after attempts were made for his signature by both Norwood and Port Adelaide. McGregor played 102 games for West Adelaide between 1923 and 1929 and was appointed captain-coach in 1926, leading them to the 1927 premiership with a 10.10 (70) to 8.10 (58) win over North Adelaide at the Adelaide Oval.

In 1926 and 1927 McGregor became the first and as of 2026 West Adelaide's only dual Magarey Medallist and the club's only player to win the award back-to-back. He represented South Australia at the interstate level 22 times during his career. Records vary, but it is possible that McGregor also won as many as six Best All Round Player Awards during his time at Westies. What is known is that he won the award in 1924, 1925, 1926 and 1927.

In 1930, he shifted to coaching South Adelaide, who had finished last for the previous four seasons and won just eleven and drawn two of 79 matches since 1925. McGregor's dedication to discipline and teamwork had a major short-term effect as the club would reach fourth place at the end of June; however, they did not maintain this form and finished sixth of eight teams with six victories in seventeen games.

With the economic privations of the Depression beginning to hit home in 1931, McGregor, along with team mate Bob Snell, the 1929 Magarey Medallist, was lured to Tasmania where the money on offer was significantly better than in Adelaide. After one season as captain-coach of North Hobart in the Tasmanian Football League (TFL) where the team finished as beaten Grand Finalists, he returned to coaching South Adelaide. He played just two games before standing down as a player but coached the club for the rest of the year with South 'winning' the wooden spoon by finishing eighth. In 1933 he was appointed coach of Glenelg and in 1934 he coached the club to their first ever SANFL Premiership.

McGregor then returned to West Adelaide as coach for 1937 but the three ensuing years in charge saw the club finish seventh in each season. He was replaced for 1940, but returned in 1941, and along with Colin Smith, coached the vastly improved team to finish third with an 11–5–1 record. West then won their semi-final clash with Port Adelaide before ending their season with a loss to eventual premiers Norwood in the preliminary-final at the Adelaide Oval.

== Family ==
Bruce McGregor and his wife Winnifred had two children. His daughter Betty was born in 1927 on the day Bruce won his second Magarey Medal and son Ken McGregor (born 1929) who went on to play for both West Adelaide and South Australia with distinction in the 1950s. Ken also played tennis at the highest level including representing Australia in three Davis Cup-winning sides (1950, 1951 and 1952) and won the 1952 Australian Open tennis – Men's Singles title at Adelaide's Memorial Drive, as well as the 1951 and 1952 Australian, French and Wimbledon and 1951 US Open men's doubles championships with Frank Sedgman.

== See also ==
- 1927 Melbourne Carnival
