= Ezard =

Ezard is a given name and a surname. Notable people with the name include:

== Surname ==
- Alan Ezard (born 1963), Australian footballer
- James Ezard (born 1986), Australian footballer

== Given name ==
- Ezard Haußmann (1935–2010), German actor
