= 1962 SANFL season =

- Teams: 10
- Premiers: Port Adelaide; 21st premiership
- Minor premiers: Port Adelaide; 31st minor premiership
- Magarey Medallist: Ken Eustice; West Adelaide
- Ken Farmer Medallist: Rex Johns; Port Adelaide (76 Goals)
- Matches played: 80
- Highest: 43,597 (Grand Final, Port Adelaide vs. West Adelaide)

The 1962 South Australian National Football League season was the 83rd season of the top-level Australian rules football competition in South Australia.

== Ladder ==
1962 SANFL Ladder
Pos	Team	Pld	W	L	D	PF	PA	PP	Pts
1	Port Adelaide (P)	19	17	2	0	1942	1248	60.88	34
2	West Adelaide	19	13	6	0	1971	1386	58.71	26
3	Norwood	19	11	7	1	1904	1616	54.09	23
4	West Torrens	19	10	8	1	1638	1398	53.95	21
5	Glenelg	19	9	10	0	1621	1756	48.00	18
6	North Adelaide	19	8	11	0	1456	1555	48.36	16
7	Sturt	19	4	15	0	1380	1975	41.13	8
8	South Adelaide	19	3	16	0	1187	2165	35.41	6

Rules for classification: 1) points; 2) percentage; 3) number of points for.
(P) Premiers

== Finals Series ==
=== Grand Final ===
1962 SANFL Grand Final
Saturday, 29 September (2:10 pm)	Port Adelaide	def.	West Adelaide	Adelaide Oval (crowd: 43,597)
1.3 (9); 4.4 (28); 7.7 (49); 8.10 (58)	Q1; Q2; Q3; Final	0.4 (4); 3.7 (25); 5.11 (41); 7.13 (55)
