= Edgar Bennetts =

Australian rules football player

Personal information
- Full name: Edgar James Knight Bennetts
- Nickname: Dickie
- Born: Moonta, South Australia
- Died: 9 October 1946 (aged 38–39); Adelaide
- Height: 5 ft 5 in (165 cm)
- Weight: 10 st 8 lb (67 kg)
- Position: Full forward
- Other occupation: Mechanic

Playing career^{1}
| Years | Club | Games (Goals) |
| 1927–1929, 1933–1935 | West Adelaide | 103 (436) |

Representative team honours^{2}
| Years | Team | Games (Goals) |
| 1928 | South Australia | 1 (3) |
- ^{1} Playing statistics correct to the end of 1935.^{2} Representative statistics correct as of 1928.

Career highlights
- SANFL debut with West Adelaide on 7 May 1927; West Adelaide leading goalkicker 1927–29, 1933–35; West Adelaide Premiership Player 1927; West Adelaide Football Club Hall of Fame 2016 inductee

Edgar James Knight "Dickie" Bennetts (1907, Moonta, South Australia – 9 October 1946, Adelaide), was an Australian rules football player for West Adelaide between 1927 and 1929 and between 1933 and 1935. Despite playing a mere six seasons, and his diminutive physique, Bennetts became the greatest goalkicker in Bloods history until Roger Luders surpassed him almost fifty seasons after he retired, (Note: The exact year Luders surpassed Bennetts varies according to sources because in some earlier years the SANFL would count goals in pre-season matches as well as those in games for premiership points.) and he remains the second-greatest.

== Early career ==
A nephew of Thomas Bennett, who played one game for the South Australia cricket team in 1894–95, Bennetts began his football career with Wallaroo Mines School. As a teenager in the middle 1920s, he established himself as a rover in the West Adelaide B grade, (Note: Now known as the "Reserves") before being earmarked for promotion to the senior team at the beginning of the 1927 season. After kicking five goals in the first B grade game, Bennetts made his senior debut in the second game of that season. He was soon shifted to the goalfront, where, despite his extremely short stature, Bennetts would excel due to his great speed on the ground and ability to kick his trademark "snap" shots accurately with both feet – an unusual skill in his era. During the Grand Final , when West won their first premiership since 1912, Bennetts reached fifty goals for the season one week after captain-coach McGregor had become the first Blood to achieve this.

In 1928 Bennetts would kick 76 goals for the season, finishing second and seven goals behind Glenelg's established champion Owens. In an amazing win against eventual premier Port Adelaide, Bennetts would become the first West player to kick ten goals in a match. He would play for South Australia against Victoria soon after, kicking three goals. 1929 saw Bennetts maintain his form with 67 goals, but he would suffer a rude shock when in the semi-final against Norwood, he was reported for "hacking" (Note: "Hacking" is an archaic term for kicking a person, an extremely serious offence in Australian rules football.) field umpire Currie.

== Suspension and second phase of career ==
In the tribunal hearing the following Wednesday, Currie said Bennetts had called him a "[time] waster" without being sure of the adjective Bennetts used. Bennetts' own evidence was viewed as "inconsistent", with the result that he was suspended for three years until 30 April 1933.

There would be an appeal on the basis of too severe a penalty against a first-time offender late in the 1929–30 off-season, but this was rejected and after the end of March, West did not seek any reduction.

After serving his sentence, Bennetts came back in fine form during pre-season practice, and, despite West Adelaide losing all seventeen matches in 1933, he would kick 74 goals. In 1934, with West rising from zero victories to eight, Bennetts would beat his 1928 club record with 86 goals for the season, and in his last season of 1935, he would kick 82. Bennetts would remain listed with the Bloods at the opening of the 1936 pre-season, but for reasons unreported in the press he would neither remain on the final list nor play again for the club.

== Death ==
When gardening on 1 October 1946, Bennetts' hand was pierced by a piece of wood, and during the following eight days he developed tetanus. He was not admitted to hospital until the morning of 9 October, and despite receiving about 600,000 units of tetanus anti-toxin, Bennetts died at about 2pm that afternoon. His death would lead to changed protocols for tetanus infections.
