= Clayton Lamb =

Australian rules footballer

Personal information
- Full name: Clayton Andrew Lamb
- Born: 1 July 1964 (age 62)
- Original team: West Adelaide (SANFL)
- Draft: No. 13, 1986 national draft
- Height: 185 cm (6 ft 1 in)
- Weight: 86 kg (13 st 8 lb; 190 lb)

Playing career^{1}
Years	Club	Games (Goals)
1981–1989	West Adelaide (SANFL)	175 (185)
1990–1993	Glenelg (SANFL)	87 (149)
1991	Adelaide (AFL)	1 (1)
- ^{1} Playing statistics correct to the end of 1993.

Career highlights
- West Adelaide Leading Goalkicker 1988; West Adelaide Club Captain 1989

Clayton Andrew Lamb (born 1 July 1964) is a former professional Australian rules footballer who played for the Adelaide Football Club in the Australian Football League (AFL). He also played for the West Adelaide Football Club and Glenelg Football Club in the South Australian National Football League (SANFL).

Lamb made his senior SANFL debut for West Adelaide in 1981 shortly after his 17th birthday, and was a regular fixture in their team throughout the 1980s (though he missed selection in their 1983 SANFL Premiership win over Sturt). A player with a long left foot kick, Lamb played mostly as a midfielder or half forward and topped West Adelaide's goal-kicking with 38 in 1988. After captaining the club in the 1989 season, he made a surprise switch to Glenelg the following year. He was good enough to represent South Australia at interstate football on three occasions.

Hawthorn had initially secured the services of Lamb, in the 1986 VFL draft, but it was with Adelaide that he made his debut at that level. Lamb was one of the foundation players for Adelaide in 1991 and made played his only league game in their round 5 loss to the West Coast Eagles at Subiaco Oval. Lamb remained the only player to be delisted by Adelaide with only one game to their name until John Hinge in 2007.
