= Glenn Kilpatrick =

Australian rules footballer

Personal information
- Full name: Glenn Matthew Kilpatrick
- Nickname: Oysters
- Born: 20 February 1972 (age 54)
- Original team: North Melbourne Under 19's
- Height: 184 cm (6 ft 0 in)
- Weight: 85 kg (187 lb)

Playing career^{1}
Years	Club	Games (Goals)
1992–1994	Essendon	26 (4)
1996–2002	Geelong	120 (31)
Total		146 (35)
- ^{1} Playing statistics correct to the end of 2002.

Career highlights
- AFL debut with Essendon on 18 April 1992 v Hawthorn at Waverley Park; SANFL debut with West Adelaide on 18 March 1995; SANFL Magarey Medallist 1995

Glenn Matthew Kilpatrick (born 29 August 1972) is a former Australian rules footballer who played for Essendon and Geelong in the Australian Football League (AFL) and West Adelaide in the South Australian National Football League (SANFL).

Originally with the North Melbourne Under-19s, Kilpatrick transferred to Essendon and made his senior AFL debut in 1992. He appeared just 26 times in three seasons for the Bombers and then spent a season playing for the West Adelaide Football Club in the SANFL. He was a joint winner of the 1995 Magarey Medal, with Norwood's Garry McIntosh.

In 1996, Kilpatrick moved to Geelong and would play 120 games for the club, finishing second in their 1997 best and fairest award.

Kilpatrick was often called "Oysters Kilpatrick" by commentator Rex Hunt. Kilpatrick also had the honour of assisting Gary Ablett Jr with his first-ever goal in professional football.
