= Stan Costello =

Australian rules footballer

Personal information
- Full name: Stanley Arthur Costello
- Born: Unknown

Playing career^{1}
| Years | Club | Games (Goals) |
| 1954–64 | West Adelaide | 126 (62) |
- ^{1} Playing statistics correct to the end of 1964.

Career highlights
- SANFL debut with West Adelaide on 24 April 1954; All-Australian 1956; West Adelaide Best & Fairest 1956 (co-winner with Aldo Rosetto); West Adelaide Premiership Player 1961

Stan Costello is a retired Australian rules football player who played for West Adelaide in the South Australian National Football League (SANFL) from 1954 to 1964.

Costello, a defender, had his best year in 1956 when he was selected in the All-Australian team at the 1956 Perth Carnival and jointly won West Adelaide's Best and Fairest award with Aldo Rossetto.
