= Don Roach =

Australian rules footballer

Personal information
- Full name: Donald Vivian Roach
- Born: 31 July 1940; Yorketown, South Australia
- Died: 3 July 2011 (aged 70); Sydney, New South Wales
- Original team: West Adelaide (SANFL)
- Height: 187 cm (6 ft 2 in)
- Weight: 80 kg (176 lb)

Playing career^{1}
Years	Club	Games (Goals)
1958–63, 1966–68	West Adelaide (SANFL)	158 (98)
1964–65	Hawthorn (VFL)	33 (7)
1970–72	Norwood (SANFL)	42 (12)
Total		233 (117)

Coaching career
Years	Club	Games (W–L–D)
1966–67	West Adelaide (SANFL)	40 (19–21–0)
- ^{1} Playing statistics correct to the end of 1972.

Career highlights
- SANFL debut with West Adelaide on 26 April 1958; West Adelaide Premiership Player 1961; 9 State games for South Australia; All-Australian 1961; VFL debut with Hawthorn on 30 May 1964 v Richmond at Glenferrie Oval; West Adelaide Captain-Coach 1966–67; West Adelaide Football Club Life Member 1963; SANFL Promotions Manager 1967–74; SANFL General Manager 1974–84; South Australian Chairman of Selectors 1975–77; SANFL Player Life Member; SANFL Life Member 1984; Sydney Swans Chief Executive Officer 1985–86; NSW AFL Tribunal Chairman 1987–88; NSW AFL Commission Chairman Sydney Football League 1989–95; South Australian Football Hall of Fame Inaugural Inductee 2002; West Adelaide Football Club Hall of Fame member

Donald Vivian Roach (31 July 1940 – 3 July 2011) was an Australian rules footballer who played for Hawthorn in the Victorian Football League (VFL) and for West Adelaide and Norwood Football Clubs in the South Australian National Football League (SANFL).

Roach, a left footed flanker, played his early football at SANFL club West Adelaide, for whom he debuted in 1958 and won the SANFL premiership in 1961. He moved to Melbourne in 1964 VFL season and joined Hawthorn but only stayed for two seasons playing 33 games for the Hawks.

In 1966 he returned to West Adelaide and was appointed captain-coach. That same year he represented South Australia at the Hobart Carnival, his second interstate carnival having competed in the 1961 Brisbane Carnival. He was selected into the All-Australian team for his efforts in Brisbane.

After taking a break from the game in 1969 Roach returned to action the following season at his new club Norwood where he would finish his career. When Roach retired in 1972 his final tally of games in the SANFL amounted to 204 and he also represented South Australia on nine occasions. He went on to serve the league as an administrator.

Don Roach was an inaugural member of the South Australian Football Hall of Fame in 2002, and he is also a member of the West Adelaide Football Club Hall of Fame.
