= Roger Luders =

Australian rules footballer

Personal information
- Full name: Roger Gordon Luders
- Born: Unknown; South Australia
- Original team: West Adelaide (SANFL)
- Position: Full forward

Playing career^{1}
Years	Club	Games (Goals)
1978–87	West Adelaide (SANFL)	144 (506) (Note: These totals refer to premiership matches (home-and-away and finals matches) only.)
- ^{1} Playing statistics correct to the end of 1987.

Career highlights
- SANFL debut with West Adelaide on 27 August 1978; West Adelaide leading goalkicker 1979–84; West Adelaide Premiership Player 1983; First West Adelaide player to kick over 100 goals in an SANFL season (105 in 1983); West Adelaide All-time leading goalkicker (506 – 1978–87); West Adelaide Football Club Life Member 1984; West Adelaide Football Club Hall of Fame Inaugural Inductee 2005

Roger Gordon Luders is a retired Australian Rules football player who played his entire league career with the West Adelaide Football Club in the South Australian National Football League (SANFL) from 1978 until his retirement in 1987. When playing for West Adelaide, Luders wore number 29.

As of 2026, Luders remains the all-time leading goalkicker for West Adelaide, having kicked 506 goals during his career in premiership matches – 70 in front of second placed Edgar "Dickie" Bennetts, who played for the Bloods between 1927 and 1935 – and also another 52 goals in night series/pre-season competition matches.

== Career ==
After coming through West Adelaide's junior ranks, Roger Luders made his league debut with West Adelaide late in the 1978 SANFL season under Fos Williams in what would be Williams' final season of coaching league football. Luders played two games in 1978, kicking four goals.

Luders, who played at full forward, quickly became known as one of the best 'high fliers' in South Australian football. Long time SANFL television commentator Ian Day (brother of West Adelaide Hall of Fame member Robert Day) stated during the telecast of West's last minor round game for 1983 against West Torrens at Football Park, after he had taken one of his signature high marks, that Luders would be worth his place in the West Adelaide side just for his spectacular high marking ability. During his time at West, Luders became one of the most popular players at the club, especially with its fans.

Luders was the Bloods' leading goalkicker from 1979 until 1984 with his supreme year coming in 1983 when he became the first West Adelaide player to ever kick over 100 goals in a season. He kicked 94 in 22 regular season games, and with his sixth goal in the Second Semi-final at Football Park, kicked his historic 100th for the season in a 74 point win over reigning premiers Norwood. Two weeks later, Luders kicked four goals in West Adelaide's 21.16 (142) to 16.12 (108) win over Sturt in the grand final to finish with 105 for the season, still the club record as of 2026. In front of 47,129 fans at Football Park, it was West Adelaide's first premiership since 1961, with both premierships under the coaching of Neil Kerley.

During the early 1980s, Luders regularly vied with other champion full forwards in the SANFL at the time such as Tim Evans (Port Adelaide), Rick Davies (Sturt), Grenville Dietrich (North Adelaide) and Neville Roberts (Norwood) for the Ken Farmer Medal, awarded annually to the SANFL's leading goal kicker. Although he continually led West Adelaide from the goal front, the award would elude Luders during his career. In his best goalkicking year in 1983, when he kicked 105 for the season, Dietrich (109), Roberts (111) and Davies, who kicked a then SANFL record 151, finished ahead of him.

In Round 17 of the 1985 season in a game at Wests home ground of Richmond Oval, Luders had his jaw broken in two places after a clash with North Adelaide's Stephen Riley; Luders had taken a mark about 30 metres out from goal at the ground's southern end when Riley jumped at him late with a raised elbow. Luders, who had kicked 52 goals for the season until that point, would spend 48 hours in hospital in intensive care and was forced to miss the rest of the season including West's return to the finals where they eventually finished third (a spate of injuries had seen West Adelaide had only finished sixth in their premiership defence in 1984).

The incident prompted West General Manager Doug Thomas to call for Riley to be de-registered from the SANFL, claiming it would be grossly unfair that Riley get to continue playing the season for North while West would be without the services of their champion full forward until the 1986 season. (Note: North Adelaide would defeat West in the 1985 Preliminary final, the Grand Final qualifier, with Riley as part of their team)

Luders returned to league football in 1986, but fans and media commentators noted that he was not the same player after returning from his broken jaw, and Luders retired from SANFL football at the end of the year having played 144 premiership games for West Adelaide over 10 seasons. His tally of 506 goals remains the West Adelaide club record, and left him with a career average of 3.35 goals per game.

Roger Luders was awarded Player Life Membership with West Adelaide in 1984 after playing his 100th game for the club in Wests' 34.17 (221) to 19.14 (128) win over Woodville at Football Park in Round 20 of the 1983 season.

== Personal ==
In 2005 Luders was an inaugural inductee into the West Adelaide Football Club Hall of Fame

Luders became an assistant coach of West Adelaide in 2009 and is the father of West Adelaide player Scott Luders.
