= 1908 SAFL Grand Final =

Australian rules football competition

West Adelaide	Norwood
7.10 (52)	6.13 (49)
	1	2	3	4
WA	0.0 (0)	3.4 (22)	4.4 (28)	7.10 (52)
NOR	3.7 (25)	4.7 (31)	5.9 (39)	6.13 (49)
- Date: Saturday, 26 September
- Stadium: Adelaide Oval
- Attendance: 22,000

The 1908 SAFL Grand Final was an Australian rules football competition. West Adelaide beat Norwood 52 to 49.
