= John Daly (footballer, born 1870) =

Australian rules footballer (1870–1913)

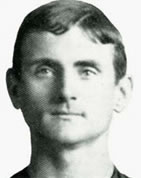

Personal information
- Full name: John Dominik Daly
- Nickname: Bunny
- Born: 1870
- Died: 26 June 1913; Adelaide

Playing career^{1}
Years	Club	Games (Goals)
1887–1898	Norwood	119 (12)
1899–1904	West Adelaide	56 (9)
Total		175 (21)

Coaching career
Years	Club	Games (W–L–D)
1899–1904	West Adelaide (SAFL)	81 (19–61–1)
- ^{1} Playing statistics correct to the end of 1904.

Career highlights
- Norwood premiership player: 1887–89, 1891, 1894; Norwood premiership captain: 1894; Norwood leading goalkicker 1887; Norwood club captain 1893–95; Championship of Australia with Norwood in 1888; 7 state games for South Australia; Australian Football Hall of Fame: inaugural inductee 1996; South Australian Football Hall of Fame: inaugural inductee 2002; Norwood Hall of Fame member

John Dominik "Bunny" Daly (1870 – 26 June 1913) was an Australian rules footballer prominent in the South Australian National Football League (SANFL) during its developmental years between 1887 and 1903.

== Norwood ==
Daly played his first match for Norwood as a 17-year-old in 1887, in a holiday exhibition match against Port Adelaide. In front of 15,000 spectators the debutant displayed an exciting running, dodging type of game for which he would become famous.

A creative rover, he was both deceptive (he loved to fake to kick, only to then recover and play on around the player) and an excellent user of the drop-kick to set the ball to his forwards.

Daly played in four premierships with Norwood, including the hat-trick between 1887 and 1889. He topped the club's goalkicking in 1887 and was awarded the best player trophy in 1897.

After playing twelve seasons for Norwood, Daly found himself forced to move to West Adelaide by a change of rules by the South Australian Football Association (as the SANFL was then named). The Association required players to play for the side representing the electoral district in which the player resided. This placed Daly with the lowly performing West Adelaide side.

== West Adelaide ==
Daly was appointed captain-coach of West Adelaide, and although his brilliant style of play continued, he was unable to raise them to any extent up the premiership table.

Daly retired in 1904, after a total of 175 SAFA games. He represented his State seven times.

== Honours ==
He was inducted into the Australian Football Hall of Fame in 1996 and into the South Australian Football Hall of Fame in 2002. He is the brother of Anthony "Bos" Daly, who was also inducted in the South Australian Football Hall of Fame.
