= James Tierney (footballer) =

Australian rules footballer

Personal information
- Full name: James Michael Tierney
- Nickname: Sorry / Dad
- Born: 27 November 1878; Gawler, South Australia
- Died: 20 March 1959 (aged 80); Melbourne, Victoria
- Original teams: Willaston, Gawler Football Association

Playing career^{1}
| Years | Club | Games (Goals) |
| 1901–02, 1904, 1906–10 | West Adelaide | 81 (18) |
| 1903 | West Torrens | 8 (1) |
| 1905–06 | South Adelaide | 10 (1) |
| 1911 | North Adelaide | 15 (4) |
| Total | | 114 (24) |

Representative team honours
| Years | Team | Games (Goals) |
| | South Australia | 9 |
- ^{1} Playing statistics correct to the end of 1911.

Career highlights
- West Adelaide co-captain 1907 (with C. V. Fulton); West Adelaide premiership player 1908, 1909; Championship of Australia with West Adelaide 1908; Magarey Medallist 1908

James Michael "Sorry" Tierney (27 November 1878 – 20 March 1959) was an Australian rules footballer who played in the South Australian Football Association (SAFA) and the South Australian Football League (SAFL), mainly with the West Adelaide Football Club.

== Biography ==
Tierney was born in Gawler, South Australia, to Luke Tierney, an Irish emigrant from County Cavan, and Mary Jane Havens. His father died in 1889, when James was a child.

== Football Career ==
Tierney, a sand carter, originally from the Willaston Football Club in the Gawler Football Association had three stints at West Adelaide in the SAFA. He made his debut on 10 August 1901 and stayed with the club in 1902. He played 18 games and kicked seven goals during this time.

He then moved to the West Torrens Football Club in 1903 where he earned selection for the South Australian state team. On reaching Melbourne, with the team, Tierney refused to play, in protest over the non-selection of Sturt ruckman "Taffy" Wayne. As a result, the SAFA suspended Tierney from interstate games for three years, though he was still able to play league football. As a result of this Tierney left West Torrens with only four games left in the season and finished the year playing for the Alma Football Club in Broken Hill.

1904 saw Tierney return to West Adelaide for one season before moving to play with South Adelaide in 1905. He was to stay at South for 1906 but after only four games of the season he transferred back to West Adelaide where he would continue until the end of the 1910 season. Tierney was named co-captain of the club in 1907 and was vice-captain of West Adelaide's 1908 and 1909 premiership sides. In 1908 West Adelaide also were crowned 'Champions of Australia' after defeating the Victorian Football League (VFL) premiership winning team Carlton 12 9 (81) to 7 10 (52) in a match played at the Adelaide Oval.

During his third and last stint at West Adelaide Tierney partnered Tom Leahy in the ruck with great success, winning the Magarey Medal in 1908 to become the first player from the club to win the award. He also formed a winning combination with West's brilliant centreman and 1909 Magarey Medalist Richard "Dick" Head.

After West finished a disappointing fifth in 1910, Tierney (along with Leahy) joined North Adelaide for the 1911 season.

In May 1912, it was reported due to ill health that he was unable to train to keep up with the game and he decided to retire from league football.

Despite his three-year ban from interstate football, Tierney played in nine games for South Australia.

== Later life ==
Tierney later worked as a labourer. In March 1917, he enlisted in the Australian Imperial Force in Adelaide, but was discharged three months later after being declared unfit for service. He had suffered from poor vision for several years, and was nearly blind in one eye after being hit in the eye with a rock two years prior.

Tierney later moved to Melbourne, where he died in 1959 at the age of 80.

== See also ==
- 1908 Melbourne Carnival
