= 1911 SAFL Grand Final =

West Adelaide	Port Adelaide
7.9 (51)	6.10 (46)
	1	2	3	4
WA	3.4 (22)	4.6 (30)	5.8 (38)	7.9 (51)
PTA	2.2 (14)	4.3 (27)	4.9 (33)	6.10 (46)
- Date: Saturday, 30 September
- Stadium: Adelaide Oval
- Attendance: 19,000

The 1911 SAFL Grand Final was an Australian rules football competition. West Adelaide beat Port Adelaide by 51 to 46.

== Scorecard ==
Grand Final
Saturday, 30 October	West Adelaide	def.	Port Adelaide	Adelaide Oval (crowd: 19,000)
3.4 (22); 4.6 (30); 5.8 (38); 7.9 (51)	Q1; Q2; Q3; Final	2.2 (14); 4.3 (27); 4.9 (33); 6.10 (46)
