= 1912 SAFL Grand Final =

West Adelaide	Port Adelaide
6.10 (46)	5.2 (32)
	1	2	3	4
WA	0.1 (1)	3.2 (20)	5.4 (34)	6.10 (46)
PTA	2.1 (13)	2.1 (13)	4.2 (26)	5.2 (32)
- Date: 2:50pm, Saturday, 28 September
- Stadium: Adelaide Oval
- Attendance: 28,500

The 1912 SAFL Grand Final was an Australian rules football competition. West Adelaide beat Port Adelaide by 46 to 32.
