= John Hinge =

Australian rules footballer

Personal information
- Full name: John Hinge
- Born: 6 June 1986 (age 40)
- Original team: Glenelg Football Club (SANFL)
- Draft: 36th overall, 2005 Rookie Draft
- Height: 187 cm (6 ft 2 in)
- Weight: 85 kg (187 lb)

Playing career^{1}
Years	Club	Games (Goals)
2005–2007	Adelaide	1 (0)
- ^{1} Playing statistics correct to the end of 2007.

John Hinge (born 6 June 1986) is a former professional Australian rules footballer who played for the Adelaide Football Club in the Australian Football League (AFL). He was originally from the Glenelg Football Club in the South Australian National Football League (SANFL).

Hinge played his only AFL game on 5 May 2007 against Collingwood at AAMI Stadium. Named on the bench, he performed solidly in a game where Adelaide was defeated, but limped off the ground after a hamstring injury.

Hinge was delisted from the Crows squad at the end of the 2007 season after playing just one game. He joined Clayton Lamb as just the second player to play only one game for Adelaide. Hinge played 75 SANFL league games with Glenelg and moved to play with Sturt for the 2010 season.

He is the elder brother of Adelaide Crows AFL football player Mitch Hinge.
