= 1909 SAFL Grand Final =

West Adelaide	Port Adelaide
7.17 (59)	6.5 (41)
	1	2	3	4
WA	1.3 (9)	3.8 (26)	6.15 (51)	7.17 (59)
PTA	3.1 (19)	4.1 (25)	6.1 (37)	6.5 (41)
- Date: Saturday, 18 September
- Stadium: Adelaide Oval
- Attendance: 25,000

The 1909 SAFL Grand Final was an Australian rules football competition. West Adelaide beat Port Adelaide by 59 to 41.
