= 1927 SANFL Grand Final =

West Adelaide	North Adelaide
10.11 (71)	9.10 (64)
	1	2	3	4
WA	2.1 (13)	5.4 (34)	8.7 (55)	10.11 (71)
NTH	3.6 (24)	5.8 (38)	7.8 (50)	9.10 (64)
- Date: Saturday, 1 October (2:10 pm)
- Stadium: Adelaide Oval
- Attendance: 33,222

The 1927 SANFL Grand Final was an Australian rules football competition. West Adelaide beat North Adelaide 71 to 64.
