= 1947 SANFL Grand Final =

West Adelaide	Norwood
10.15 (75)	5.15 (45)
	1	2	3	4
WA	2.5 (17)	5.6 (36)	7.12 (54)	10.15 (75)
NOR	0.4 (4)	2.10 (22)	4.12 (36)	5.15 (45)
- Date: Saturday, 4 October
- Stadium: Adelaide Oval
- Attendance: 32,631

The 1947 SANFL Grand Final was an Australian rules football competition. West Adelaide beat Norwood 75 to 45.
