= West Adelaide Football Club =

Australian rules football club

Names
- Full name: West Adelaide Football Club
- Nickname(s): Westies; The Bloods; Blood and Tars; The Wolves; Red and Blacks; The Bottle Tops

2025 season
- After finals: 10th
- Home-and-away season: 10th (SANFL)
- Leading goalkicker: Thomas Scully (30)

Club details
- Founded: 1892; 134 years ago
- Colours: Black and Red
- Competition: Adelaide and Suburban Football Association 1892–1896; South Australian National Football League since 1897
- President: Alison Surjan
- CEO: Adam May
- Coach: Nathan Bassett
- Captain(s): Sam Frost & Isaac Johnson (men's); Madi Russell (women's)
- Premierships: SANFL (9): 1908, 1909, 1911, 1912, 1927, 1947, 1961, 1983, 2015
- Ground: Richmond Oval (currently Hisense Arena) (capacity: 16,500)

Uniforms
Home	Away

Other information
- Official website: westadelaidefc.com.au

The West Adelaide Football Club is an Australian rules football club in the South Australian National Football League (SANFL). Nicknamed the Bloods and commonly known as Westies, the club's home base is Richmond Oval, (Note: Currently known as Hisense Stadium under a sponsorship agreement) located in Richmond, an inner-western suburb of Adelaide.

The club has won nine SANFL premierships, the most recent coming in 2015, which broke a thirty-two-year premiership drought dating back to 1983; the second longest in the SANFL.

== Club history ==
=== Early years ===
The West Adelaide Football Club was formed in 1892 and adopted magenta and white as their colours. The Club patron was Mr Theo. Scherk, President Mr J. Hallow, Secretary R.M.L. Mander, Treasurer Mr J. McCabe, Captain A. Forrestal and Vice Captain W. Morris.

A meeting was advertised for those interested in a Junior Football Club in West Adelaide. It was held at the Bristol Tavern, Franklin Street, Adelaide, on Tuesday, 3 April 1894, at 8 p.m. A large number of members attended. Mr. J Coppinger presided. The following officers were elected: Patron, Dr. Todd; president, Mr W. Powell; and a large number of vice-presidents; secretary, Mr. R.M.L. Mander; treasurer, Mr. J. McCabe; committee, Messrs. Forrestall, Sheenan, Foyne, Weismeyer, and Brady; delegates to the Adelaide and Suburban Football Association, Messrs. Hinder and McCabe; Special delegate, Mr. J. J. Sheehan. The appointments of captain and vice-captain were held over.

The club joined the Adelaide and Suburban Association in 1894 and won premierships in 1895 and 1896.

The 1895 and 1896 Annual Meetings were also held at the Bristol Tavern. At the 1896 Meeting held on 24 March Mr. E. L. Batchelor, M.P., presided over the meeting. For the upcoming season the captain was Mr T Bishop and vice-captain Mr Quinn.

=== SAFA Admission and Introduction of Electoral Football ===
Following the club's annual general meeting on 30 March 1897, the club applied to join the South Australian Football Association (SAFA) which was approved by 6 votes to 4 against at a meeting held on 5 April 1897. (Note: The SAFA would subsequently become the SAFL in 1907 and the SANFL in 1927)

Upon entering the SAFA senior competition, West Adelaide changed their colours to black and red, the colours previously worn by the defunct Old Adelaide Football Club and moved its training headquarters from the South to the West Parklands. The club often struggled to field a full team in its early years as clubs were then controlled by wealthy businessmen and it was no secret that players were regularly poached from less wealthy clubs. West Adelaide was one of the "poor" clubs and consequently won only one of its first 31 matches.

From the 1899 season the SAFA introduced electoral district football in which players had to play for the club in the district where they lived. West Adelaide immediately gained the services of one of the best players of the time, "Bunny" Daly who threw himself into developing the club. Nonetheless, the club still struggled and had won only twenty and drawn two of 127 games by the end of 1907, including a second winless season in 1906. However, with a number of young players such as Richard "Dick" Head joining veterans James Tierney. West's fortunes were about to change and the club would enter what is known as its "Golden Era".

=== Golden era (1908–1913) ===
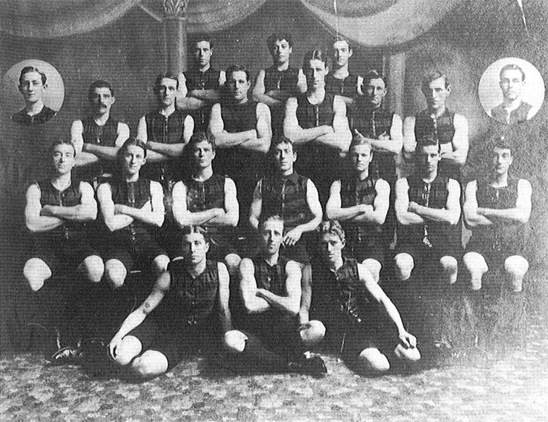
West Adelaide won two Championships of Australia, one in 1908, and another with the team pictured above in 1911

Prior to the 1908 season, West Adelaide never finished higher than fifth on the premiership ladder. In 1908 former Hotham captain and South Adelaide and North Adelaide champion "Dinny" Reedman became West's first coach. West Adelaide not only became SANFL premiers for the first time defeating Norwood in the grand final at the Adelaide Oval but also became Champions of Australia when they defeated powerful Victorian Football League team Carlton by five goals at the Adelaide Oval.

Jos Dailey captained the Premiership and Champions of Australia team in 1908 and went on to lead the Bloods to three more Premierships, while James "Sorry" Tierney was the club's first ever winner of the Magarey Medal in 1908.

West Adelaide repeated as SAFL premiers in 1909 after defeating Port Adelaide by a goal in the grand final while "Dick" Head won the club's second Magarey Medal. The club slumped in 1910 to finish in fifth place before repeating their 1908 double success by winning the 1911 SANFL Premiership defeating Port Adelaide in the grand final and Essendon to win the Championship of Australia.

The heartland and spiritual home of the West Adelaide Football Club was the West End of Adelaide. In 1911 after winning the SAFL premiership and beating Essendon to become Champions of Australia, the manager of the West End Brewery, which was located on Hindley Street, chose to adopt the black and red colours of the West Adelaide as those of the brewery and the nickname 'The Bottletops' soon followed for the Football Club.

The club won its fourth SAFL premiership in five years in 1912 after again defeating Port Adelaide in the grand final before finishing their Golden Era with a third placing in 1913.

=== Interwar struggles ===
After the SAFL resumed competition following World War I, West Adelaide initially struggled, winning only nine and drawing two of 38 games between 1919 and 1921, finishing last in 1920 and second-last in 1919 and 1921. However, after narrowly qualifying for the finals in 1922, West would defeat second-placed West Torrens before losing the Final to Norwood. That season, Robert Barnes because the club's third Magarey Medalist, while Bruce McGregor became the club's fourth Magarey Medalist when he won the award in 1926; however, between 1923 and 1926 West would not participate in the major round and won only 23 of 56 games.

The club began playing their home games at the Wayville Showgrounds in 1927 after their new headquarters was opened on 23 April. The club won its fifth premiership by defeating North Adelaide by two goals in the grand final. Captain-coach Bruce McGregor would not only lead his team to this 1927 premiership but became the first (and so far only) West Adelaide player to win back to back Magarey Medals. Robert Snell (1929), Jack Sexton (1931) and Ray McArthur (1939) also won the Magarey with the Bloods in this period.

After finishing third in 1928 and 1929 followed by – in the absence of star goalsneak "Dickie" Bennetts who was banned for three years for kicking an umpire – fifth in 1930, West Adelaide slumped badly in 1931 to last with only two wins before bouncing back to fifth in 1932 only half a game from the finals. Despite Bennetts' return, they finished winless for the third time in 1933 but were terribly unlucky in losing five games by a goal or less. They recovered to win eight games and draw one in 1934, but between 1935 and 1940 were only once higher than seventh in an eight-team competition and overall won only 26 and drew one of 102 games.

The club played its last home game at the Adelaide Showgrounds in Wayville on 19 August 1939 due to the Australian Army taking over the site during World War II. From the start of 1940 until the end of 1957 home games were again played at Adelaide Oval.

An unexpected 112-point thrashing of North Adelaide in their last game of 1940, however, proved a true omen of what was to come in 1941. The Bloods carried all before them early in the season and after ten games had suffered only a draw and two narrow losses. A slump ensued before the club rebounded to finish third and defeat Port Adelaide in the first semi before Sturt knocked the inexperienced Bloods out in the preliminary.

Between 1942 and 1944 West Adelaide joined forced with Glenelg in a wartime competition, finishing second, third and fourth in a four-team competition.

=== "Thereabouts" but never "there" ===
West Adelaide became one of the power teams in the SANFL following the resumption of full-scale competition in 1945. The club finished third in 1946 before winning its sixth premiership in 1947 defeating Norwood 10.15 (75) to 8.15 (63). One of West's leading players during this time was future SANFL legend Fos Williams who played 54 games for the club between 1946 and 1949 before moving on to captain-coach Port Adelaide in 1950, a move that would haunt West Adelaide for the next thirteen seasons as Wests would lose five grand finals, all by less than three goals, to the Williams-coached Port Adelaide between 1954 and 1962.

During the mid-1950s, West Adelaide, under the coaching of Laurie Cahill and with strong players such as Neil Kerley, Brian Faehse, Doug Thomas, Ken Eustice, Ken McGregor and 1957 Magarey Medalist Ron Benton, became regular finals visitors and finished as beaten grand finalists in 1954, losing the grand final to the Fos Williams led Port Adelaide by just three points. The 1954 final was marred by a brawl which broke out at half time of the match when angry Port supporters set upon Wests players as they attempted to enter the dressing room located in the Sir Edwin Smith Stand. This was a reaction to a heavy but legal clash prior to the end of the half between Wests captain Brian Faehse and Ports Dave Boyd in which Boyd had come off second best. Wests had been leading by 25 points at half time but the melee in the crowd proved unsettling with some battered Wests players not making it back to the dressing room until the team was due to go back out onto the oval for the second half. Port came back to trail by only two points going into the last quarter of the game and snatched victory by three points.

The half-time melee was the main topic of discussion at an SANFL meeting following the game which prompted the building of the underground dressing rooms at the Adelaide Oval during the summer of 1954–55 while leaving the rooms in the stands to the cricketers. West Adelaide and their captain Brian Faehse were given the honour of being the first team to use the new rooms and to run out onto the oval from them at the start of the 1955 SANFL season.

Wests finished a disappointing seventh in 1955, but would return to form in 1956 where they would again be beaten grand finalists, again losing to Port. After finishing third in 1957, West Adelaide would play in both the 1958 and 1959 SANFL Grand Finals and again would be beaten by the Fos Williams coached Port Adelaide by just two points in 1958 and ten points in 1959. In the former year a late kick for goal by ruckman Jack Richardson which would have given West the lead with only ninety seconds remaining hit the post allowing Port to hold on. Later on grand final night, a group of Wests players, including Kerley, broke into the Adelaide Oval and cut down the goalpost. The post would later end up hanging over the Bar in the West Adelaide Footballers' Club.

In 1954 the club's search for a permanent home ground was solved with the founding of Richmond Oval. It was the first ground purpose-built for Australian Rules Football in Australia, pre-dating the VFL's Waverley Park by twelve years. Richmond Oval was opened by long-serving member of the South Australian Legislative Council Sir Lyell McEwin on 26 April 1958. A capacity crowd saw West Adelaide christen their new home with a 12.11 (83) to 10.13 (73) win over neighbouring club West Torrens.

After finishing fourth in 1960, West Adelaide, captain-coached by Neil Kerley, won their seventh premiership in 1961, when they defeated Norwood by six goals in the grand final. The club would play its nemesis Port Adelaide in the 1962 grand final and once again would go down by a heartbreaking three points to the Magpies. Ken Eustice would become the club's tenth Magarey Medalist in 1962. Sensationally after taking the club to two grand finals and one premiership in his two years as coach of the club, Kerley was sacked as West's coach after the 1962 season. He was reluctantly replaced by longtime teammate and friend Doug Thomas, who went to the club committee before the season and unsuccessfully asked them to re-instate Kerley as captain-coach. Kerley continued on as a player in 1963 honouring his contract, but the following season he left to become captain-coach of South Adelaide, taking the Panthers from bottom in 1963 to their last SANFL Premiership to date in 1964.

=== Lean years ===
Following the 1961 premiership win and subsequent runners-up in 1962, West Adelaide would go through a very lean time. After finishing second in 1962 the club lost amongst others Kerley, Eustice, Jeff Bray and Don Roach from their playing ranks leading to a lean spell for the club. After having played in thirteen finals series and six grand finals between 1946 and 1963 for two premierships (1947 and 1961), the club would only reach the finals another five times (1968 – fourth, 1969 – third, 1976 – fifth, 1977 – third and 1981 – fifth) between 1964 and 1982.

The ground record crowd for Richmond Oval was set in Round 5 of the 1969 season when 15,742 turned up to see Westies take on a Glenelg side coached by none other than Neil Kerley. Glenelg defeated the Bloods 18 18 (126) to 8.9 (57) on the day and the record crowd still stands as of 2013.

In the early 1970s, West Adelaide declined to their lowest ebb for a third of a century, finishing last in 1972 for the first time since 1936, and repeating this ignominy in 1973 and 1974. In 1970 West unearthed a young ruckman named Dexter Kennedy who made his league debut aged just 15 years, 11 months and 2 days. Kennedy would go on to play 236 games for the club between 1970 and 1982 before playing the last two seasons of his career with Port Adelaide. 1947 premiership player and nine-time premiership coach of Port Adelaide, Fos Williams began coaching the club in 1974 and after a tough start the team improved finishing sixth in 1975, fifth in 1976 and third in 1977. However, that was the high point for the Bloods during the 1970s as they fell dramatically to ninth in 1978 in what was to be Williams' last season of coaching league football before again finishing last under coach Trevor Hughes in 1979. The other great highlight for the club during the 1970s was the recruitment of Port rover Trevor Grimwood who would become the club's eleventh Magarey Medal winner in 1977.

=== Inconsistent but dangerous ===
The Bloods would continue to perform poorly as they finished second last in 1980 and Trevor Hughes was sacked following the season. Club General Manager Doug Thomas and President Bob Lee enticed 1961 premiership coach Neil Kerley away from West Torrens and back to West Adelaide in 1981 and the improvement in the team was immediate. The Bloods finished 5th in 1981, defeated in the Elimination Final by Norwood. Under Kerley players such as Roger Luders, Bruce Lindner, Ian Borchard, Peter Meuret, Geoff Morris and Mark Mickan all started to play their best football and 1982 was almost a repeat of the 1981 season. Going into the final round West were locked in a battle for the 5th and final finals spot on the ladder. However, Norwood again ended their run when they thumped the Bloods at Norwood Oval consigning West to a 6th-place finish.

The team hit its straps in the 1983 season, winning its first minor premiership since 1962 by two games from Sturt with an 18–4 record. The team finally got its revenge on Norwood when they put a severe dent in the Redlegs premiership defence with a 77-point win the 2nd Semi-final to earn a spot in their first grand final since 1962. The Following week Sturt defeated Norwood in the Preliminary to earn the other grand final berth. Westies won their eighth premiership when Kerley coached the team to a 21.16 (142) to 16.12 (108) win in the grand final in front of 47,129 fans at Football Park. West Adelaide had winners all over the ground but it was captain Ian Borchard who won the Jack Oatey Medal as the best player in the grand final while centre half-forward Bruce Lindner kicked five goals and full-forward Roger Luders four. Lindner's fifth goal was the last of the game, a 65-metre kick on the full from inside the centre square only seconds before the game ended.

Two of Wests best players throughout the 1983 season were unlucky to miss a place in the grand final team. Ruckman Mark Mickan, the clubs Best & Fairest for the year, ruptured his Posterior cruciate ligament in the teams 93-point win over Woodville at Football Park in Round 20 and missed the remainder of the season, while Roger Winter, twin brother of grand final back pocket player Peter Winter, was injured in the 2nd Semi against Norwood and could not recover in time to take his place in the side. Mickan's place was taken by 6 ft 7 in (201 cm) tall Dirk de Jong who had actually retired from league football one game into the season, but was persuaded by Kerley to come back following Mickan's injury. Despite some impressive performances in his final four games, including outplaying experienced Sturt ruckman Frank Spiel in the grand final, de Jong, who started his SANFL career with Wests in 1978, again retired from football after 1983 having played 53 games for the club.

Roger Luders created history in 1983 when he became the first West Adelaide player to ever kick 100 goals in an SANFL season, finishing with 105 goals from 24 games played. Luders kicked 94 goals in the 22 game minor round and with the 6th of his 7 goals in the 2nd Semi-final against Norwood he kicked his 100th for the season. Luders remains the club's all-time leading goal kicker with 558 goals kicked in 162 games played between 1978 and 1986 at an average of 3.4 goals per game. Luders tally of 558 goals places him 14th on the list of all-time SANFL goal kickers. During his career Luders was known as one of the most spectacular high marking full-forwards in the SANFL

In 1985 Grantley Fielke, a premiership player from 1983, would become the club's twelfth Magarey Medal winner. West Adelaide, coached by Port Adelaide premiership player and coach John Cahill (Note: Nephew of former West coach Laurie Cahill) finished third in the 1985 SANFL season, missing out on a grand final spot by less than two goals to North Adelaide in the Preliminary Final.

In 1991, the formation of the Adelaide Football Club, South Australia's first team in the Australian Football League (formerly the VFL) saw a number of Wests players signed by the new team. Bloods players such as Grantley Fielke, Paul Patterson, and two young guns in Tony Modra and Shaun Rehn were signed to play AFL football, but would still be eligible to play for West Adelaide if not selected by the Adelaide Crows. The Crows also signed former Bloods Bruce Lindner (Geelong) and Mark Mickan (Brisbane) who under the rules of the time, were automatically allocated back to their former SANFL club.

West Adelaide, which has earned a reputation amongst its fans as being "consistently inconsistent", would win through to their next grand final in 1991. After a slow start to the season under the coaching of former Richmond (VFL) premiership player Kevin Morris, the team won nine of its last eleven games to reach the finals in fifth place. With young players such as leading goal kicker Greg Mellor, full forward Tony Modra, and best and fairest Peter Banfield playing alongside returning experienced veterans such as captain Leon Grosser, who would unfortunately miss the grand final through injury, Glenn Goss, as well as Mickan and Lindner, (Note: While playing for the Adelaide Crows in the AFL, Lindner had played enough games with West through the season to qualify for the finals) West easily defeated three-time defending premiers Port Adelaide by 89 points in the Elimination Final before winning the First Semi against Woodville-West Torrens (Note: Woodville-West Torrens was a new team formed through the merger of West Torrens and Woodville at the end of 1990) by 60.

They then defeated a determined South Adelaide by 21 points in the Preliminary Final and would then come up against North Adelaide, a team they had not beaten since Round 17 of the 1985 season. Despite the Roosters squad having far more finals experience than West, the in-form Bloods were rated an even chance to beat the Roosters who were playing in their fifth grand final since 1985. In the week leading up to the match there were rumours around Adelaide that Westies were going to "go the biff" in a bid to unsettle the Roosters and in front of 39,276, the smallest SANFL Grand Final crowd since the 1950s, the game became a spiteful affair with many brawls erupting between opposing players following Norths Steven Sims knocking out Wests Matthew Simpson early in the second quarter (it was alleged after the game that Sims had hit Simpson, not to knock him out but to stop his overly close tagging of North's Darel Hart). From that point on, West tended to forget about playing football and seemed more intent on punishing Sims, who finished the game with his right eye badly swollen and requiring 5 stitches. West Adelaide may have won the fights, but North Adelaide won the football game would go on to win easily by the score of 21.22 (148) to 11.7 (73). Crows player Darel Hart (Note: Hart had played 18 AFL games for Adelaide during the year but had enough SANFL games to qualify for the finals) kicked seven goals for the Roosters on his way to winning the Fos Williams Medal. Future dual Crows premiership player Shaun Rehn who had made his AFL debut during the year with the Crows missed the SANFL finals through injury.

Following the 1991 grand final Kevin Morris joined a long list of coaches sacked by the club after a dispute with the club's board. In his place, for his third run as West Adelaide coach was Neil Kerley, who himself had been controversially sacked as coach of the club after taking them to the 1962 Grand Final. The club slipped to sixth in 1992 and a disappointing eighth in 1993, ahead of perennial wooden spooners Sturt by only a small percentage gap. Following the 1993 season, Kerley was not retained and replaced by 220 game player Geoff Morris who led the team to second last in 1994, but improved to fifth in 1995. In 1995 Glenn Kilpatrick became West's thirteenth Magarey Medalist when he jointly won the award with Norwood legend Garry McIntosh. Former Norwood premiership player and Crows assistant coach Michael Taylor replaced Morris in 1996 and West would reach a best of third in 1998 before losing to Port Adelaide in the Preliminary final. Full-forward Adam Richardson became the first West Adelaide player since Peter Phipps in 1957 to lead the SANFL goalkicking when he kicked 80 in the regular season and five in the finals to finish with 85 for the season and win the Ken Farmer Medal.

After missing the finals in 1999 and 2000, for 2001 West Adelaide hired former premiership captain and best and fairest winner Ian Borchard as coach. Borchard led the Bloods back to the finals in 2001 and 2002, but they lost the Elimination Final each time. Former West Adelaide junior and dual Adelaide Crows premiership player Shaun Rehn replaced Borchard in 2003 and led the club to a grand final for only the third time in 41 years. Facing a red-hot Central District team aiming for their third premiership in four years, West went down 17.9 (111) to 11.11 (77) in front of 28,199 at AAMI Stadium in the grand final. Darren Bradshaw won the Ken Farmer Medal as the SANFL's leading goal kicker in 2003, kicking 88 for the season. He added another nine goals in the finals to finish on 97 for the year.

=== Abrupt decline and revival ===
Once again West Adelaide failed to follow up its good form from the previous season and while still managing to qualify for the finals in 2004 had to be satisfied with just a fifth-placed finish. Things went from bad to worse for the club in 2005 when the team finished with the wooden spoon for the first time since 1979. Following such a dramatic drop in form, Rehn resigned as coach and was replaced by former Crows teammate Wayne Weidemann for 2006 and 2007. Despite West Adelaide playing their 400th game at Richmond Oval when they faced Sturt on 7 April 2006, neither season would bring any joy for the Bloods or their supporters as they finished with the wooden spoon in each season. Not surprisingly, Weidemann was replaced as coach following the 2007 season. His replacement was former Hawthorn premiership player from 1991 Andrew Collins. However, Collins could not improve the results in 2008 and the club finished with an unwanted fourth wooden spoon in a row, an ignominy suffered previously by Sturt (1989 to 1996), Woodville (1980 to 1985), South Adelaide (1926 to 1929), Glenelg (1937 to 1940 and 1921 to 1925) and Norwood (1913 to 1919), but never despite several bleak eras by the Bloods. Strong recruiting helped the team improve to sixth in 2009 while James Ezard, nephew of 1984 and 1985 Essendon premiership player Alan Ezard, jointly won the Magarey Medal with North Adelaide's Rhys Archard, becoming the fourteenth West Adelaide player to win the award.

The Bloods again finished sixth in 2010, missing the major round for the sixth consecutive season. In a major development for the club, lights for night games were installed at Richmond Oval (Note: At that time called City Mazda Stadium under a sponsorship deal) in 2010 and Friday night games became a success with 6,133 fans attending the Bloods' first ever home game under lights against North Adelaide on 26 March.

Despite winning their last game of the season at home against Sturt, West missed the SANFL Finals for the seventh straight season, finishing third last with an 8–12 record. West Adelaide started the season well with a 5–1 record but injuries to key players plus general poor form saw the Bloods lose seven games in a row mid-season. Early in the 2011 season coach Andrew Collins had his contract extended for a further two years tying him to the club until 2013.

2012 finally saw the work of Andy Collins and his staff finally come to fruition with the Bloods finishing the minor round in third place with a 12–8 record, including being only one of two sides to beat runaway minor premiers Norwood. Collins was criticised in the media for resting his "star" players over the final three rounds after West had already been assured of third place and the "double chance" in the finals. The Bloods got some revenge for their 2003 Grand Final loss to Centrals with a 27-point win in the Qualifying final to book a place against Norwood in the Second Semi-final. However, Norwood's defensive game held them to just two goal in the final, the Redlegs easily booking a place in the 2012 Grand Final, winning 8.13 (61) to 2.5 (17). West bounced back a week later to record a 13.10 (88) to 10.7 (67) win over North Adelaide in the Preliminary Final to book a place in their seventeenth SANFL Grand Final, and their first against Norwood since the Bloods 1961 premiership. However, Norwood's impregnable defence won out again, and the Bloods were in danger of equalling North Adelaide's 1989 ignominy of kicking only one goal in a Grand Final before two late goals in time-on of the last quarter saw then go down 12.7 (79) to 3.12 (30).

2013 saw West Adelaide consolidate itself as a finals campaigner, finishing the minor round in second place again behind Norwood. However, a second consecutive grand final appearance went begging when North Adelaide reversed the previous years result and booked a place in the GF against Norwood, (Note: Norwood would win their second straight flag) leaving The Bloods to finish in third place wondering what might have been.

During 2013, the club won its first competition since winning the 1987 Foundation Cup (Note: SANFL pre-season) when they won the 2013 Foxtel Cup, defeating WAFL side East Fremantle 4.8 (32) to 2.16 (28) at Football Park, a win worth A$100,000 in prizemoney to the club. West held a 25-point lead over the Sharks at halftime by keeping them goalless, but were themselves kept goalless in the second half scoring only three points. Helped by poor kicking for goal by the Perth based club who could only manage 2.12 (24) for the second half, West Adelaide held on for a hard-fought four-point win.

At season's end, Ryan Ferguson retired returning home to Victoria. CEO Kym Russell also ended his association with the club while coach Andrew Collins won a job at Williamstown. With Collins' and Ferguson's departures, West Adelaide appointed club Hall of Famer Mark Mickan as its head coach for the 2014 season. Mickan appointed co-winner of the 2013 Neil Kerley Medal Chris Schmidt as the new club captain.

In 2015, West Adelaide broke a 32-year premiership drought, beating Woodville-West Torrens by 30 points in the 2015 SANFL Grand Final to secure their ninth SANFL premiership. Former Adelaide Crows player Jason Porplyzia won the Neil Kerley Medal as the club's best and fairest player for his premiership heroics, while Schmidt won the Jack Oatey Medal for the best-on-ground during the grand final.

In the following year of 2016, the Bloods fell from premiers to wooden spooners. (Note: Glenelg in 1934 and 1935 was the only previous instance of this in South Australian football history.) The club was affected by retirements and the Parkinson's Disease diagnosis in coach Mickan. The Bloods again finished last in five consecutive seasons between 2019 and 2023, and between 2016 and 2025 won only 36 and drew two of 176 matches, the worst SANFL record for a ten-season period since Sturt won only 43 games out of 215 between 1987 and 1996.

== Women's Team ==
West Adelaide were a foundation member of the SANFL Women's competition in 2017. Since the beginning of the competition, West Adelaide has been home to four winners of SANFL Women's League Best and Fairest Award – Hannah Button 2018, Rachelle Martin 2020, Lauren Young 2021, and Zoe Venning 2025, the first three of these have since been drafted to AFL Women's clubs. However, the Bloods have yet to win the SANFL Women's premiership.

== Current playing list ==
West Adelaide Football Club
Senior list			Coaching staff
1 Chris Burgess; 2 Joel Parker; 3 Tom Morrish; 4 Tom Scully; 5 Bradly Searle; 6 Sam Frost (c); 7 Jonti Schuback; 8 Cooper Patterson; 9 Kobe Ryan (vc); 10 Cade Kennedy; 11 Oscar Kreger; 12 Harvey Griffiths; 13 Benjamin Ridgeway; 14 Jesse Thackeray; 15 Lachlan Squire; 16 Hamish Dow; 17 Judd Hansen; 18 Harvey Bock; 19 Jye Sinderberry; 21 Jed Obst; 22 Jordan White; 23 Michael Laudato	24 Jonty Koehne; 25 Lachlan Tredwell; 26 Brad Rauter; 27 Jack Oates; 28 Callum Park; 29 Hamish Ellem; 30 Oscar Talbot; 30 Riley Hill; 32 Samuel Burbridge; 33 Thomas Kain; 34 Dylan White; 35 Lachie Hall; 36 Caleb May; 37 Lincoln Pitt; 38 Mitch Obst; 39 Lucas White; 40 Gus Downs; 41 Oliver Charlesworth; 42 Archie Walsh; 44 Harper Ryan; 45 Cormack O'Reilly	46 Nathan Maunder; 47 Jack Rudd; 48 Tahi Brain; 49 Jake Agnew; 50 Max Downs; 51 Fletcher Dillon; 52 Campbell Schubert; 53 Ben Hogan; 55 Hamish Illman; 56 Lachlan Slattery; 57 Jaylen Sochaki; 58 Logan McCabe; 70 Shaun Watson; 72 Duot Bul; 73 Harry Manolopolous; 74 Jack McKay; 75 Jack Chiswell; 66 Oscar Talbot; 68 Thomas Mickan; 69 Zac Woolridge; 75 Tyson Birss	Head coach: Nathan Bassett; Assistant coaches: Ben Warren; Sam Elliott; Simon Munn; Legend: (c) Captain(s); (vc) Vice-captain(s); Updated: 19 June 2025; Source(s): Player list, Coaching staff

== Home grounds ==
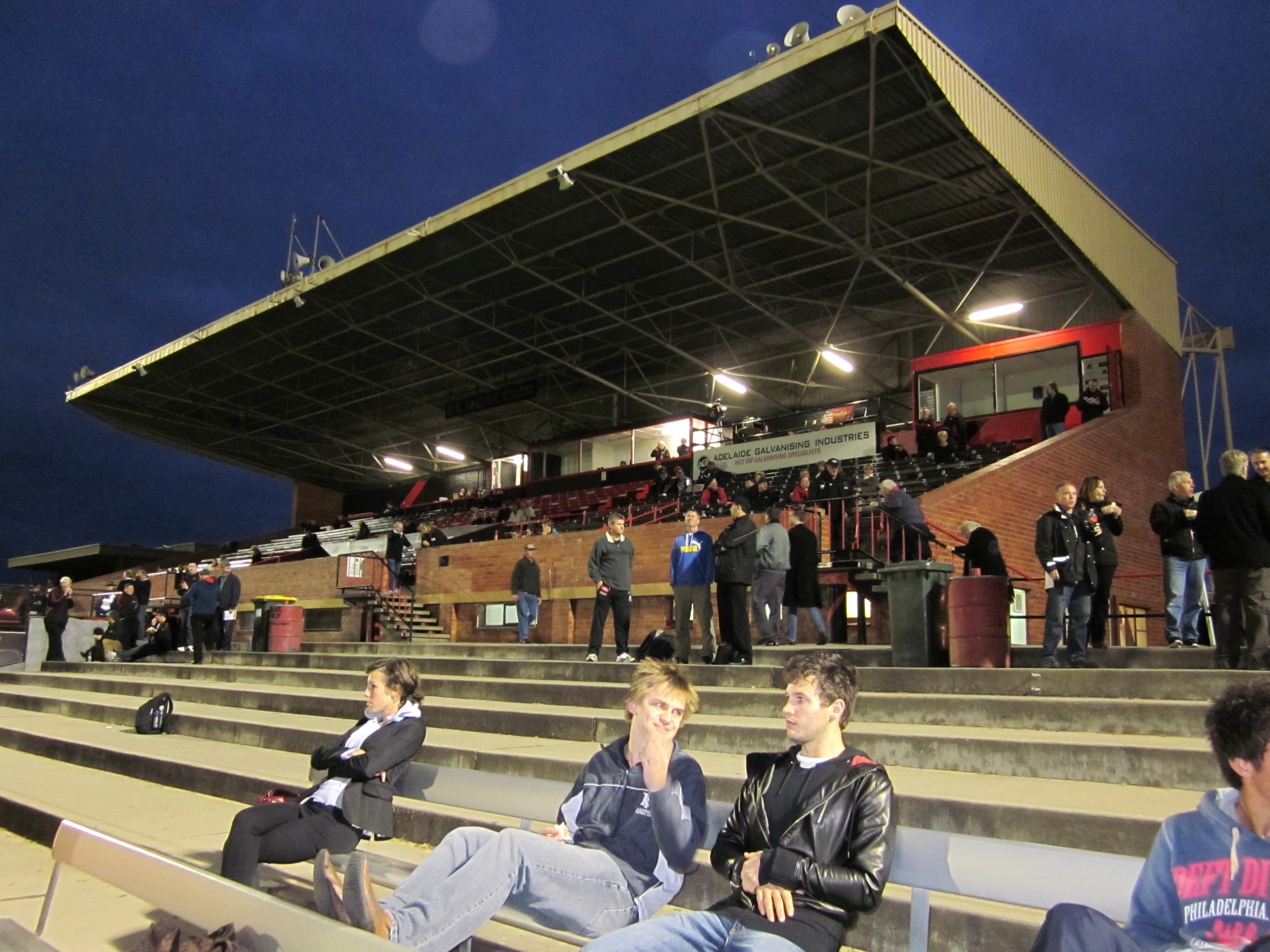
The B. K. Faehse Stand at Richmond Oval

- Kensington Oval (1897)
- Jubilee Oval (1898–1906)
- Adelaide Oval (1907–1926, 1940–1957)
- Wayville Showgrounds (1927–1939)
- Richmond Oval (1958–present)

The West Adelaide Football Club had no home ground to call their own until the planning and building of Richmond Oval in the early 1950s. The ground was used for training and junior games until it was ready for league use in 1958. The Bloods christened their first game at Richmond by defeating neighbouring club West Torrens 12.11 (83) to 10.13 (73) in front of just over 15,000 fans. Such was the success of Richmond Oval that the SANFL moved its traditional ANZAC Day match from the Adelaide Oval to Richmond in 1958 where West Adelaide defeated their long-time Grand Final tormentor Port Adelaide in one of the highest profile matches ever played at the ground.

Thanks to the tireless efforts of people such as the club captain Brian Faeshe, (Note: Faeshe ironically never got to play on the ground having retired in 1956) Cliff Semmler, Roy Charles, Cliff Todd and City of West Torrens Mayor Steve Hamra, The Bloods finally had a home ground to call their own. In the 2000s the grandstand at the oval was named the B. K. Faeshe Stand in honour of the former champion player, coach and administrator of the club. Brian Faeshe was one of the driving forces in the formation of Richmond Oval while still a player with West Adelaide.

Prior to the opening of Richmond Oval West Adelaide had used Kensington Oval (1897), Jubilee Oval (1898–1906) and the Adelaide Oval (1907–1926) for its "home" games before gaining exclusive SANFL use of the main arena at the Wayville Showgrounds in 1927, the year of their fifth SANFL Premiership. The club used Wayville Showgrounds until the end of 1939 when it was taken over by the Australian Army following the outbreak of World War II. West then went back to the Adelaide Oval for its home games from 1940 until 1957, sharing the ground with South Adelaide. For both stints at the Adelaide Oval, this created problems because during the football season South, being the main tenant, had first use of the oval (league) and the Adelaide Oval No. 2 (reserves) for training purposes with Westies often having to train in the Adelaide Park Lands until Richmond became available for training from 1955.

Prior to the 2010 SANFL season West Adelaide installed lights at Richmond Oval for night games. The lights have seen an increase of attendances at the ground with the first game under lights attracting the grounds current record night crowd of 6,133 for the opening game of the season with West defeating North Adelaide 14.19 (103) to 4.7 (31).

The record attendance for a West Adelaide home game was set at Richmond Oval in 1969 when 15,742 attended the Round 5 fixture against Glenelg.

Richmond Oval hosted its first Interstate game in 2013 when South Australia defeated Qld/NT (NEAFL north) 21.14 (140) to 9.4 (58).

On 16 February 2014, Richmond played host to an AFL pre-season game in the 2014 NAB Challenge between Adelaide's two AFL teams, the Adelaide Crows and Port Adelaide. In front of 8,765 fans, the Crows defeated Port Adelaide 0.18.11 (119) to 0.9.5 (59). The oval received over A$300,000 from the AFL for upgrades to the ground, including improved interchange area and coaches boxes, new goal and point posts and new grass.

== Club achievements ==
Premierships
Competition	Level	Wins	Years won
South Australian National Football League	Men's Seniors	9	1908, 1909, 1911, 1912, 1927, 1947, 1961, 1983, 2015
South Australian National Football League	Men's Reserves	4	1929, 1940, 1951, 1994
South Australian National Football League	Under 19s (1937–2008)	6	1943, 1944, 1968, 1978, 2002, 2004
South Australian National Football League	Under 17s (1939–2008)	4	1948, 2001, 2002, 2006
South Australian National Football League	Under 18s (2009–present)	1	2014
South Australian National Football League	Under 16s (2010–present)	1	2025
Other titles and honours
Championship of Australia	Men's Seniors	2	1908, 1911
Stanley H Lewis Trophy	Multiple	0	Nil
SANFL Night Premiership	Men's Seniors	6	1955, 1957, 1960, 1962, 1985, 1987
Foxtel Cup	Men's Seniors	1	2013
Finishing positions
South Australian National Football League	Minor premiership (men's seniors)	2	1927, 1983
South Australian National Football League	Grand Finalists (men's seniors)	9	1922, 1954, 1956, 1958, 1959, 1962, 1991, 2003, 2012
South Australian National Football League	Wooden spoons (men's seniors)	24	1897, 1898, 1904, 1905, 1906, 1920, 1931, 1933, 1936, 1972, 1973, 1974, 1979, 2005, 2006, 2007, 2008, 2016, 2019, 2020, 2021, 2022, 2023, 2025
South Australian National Football League	Grand Finalists (women's seniors)	1	2021
South Australian National Football League	Wooden spoons (women's seniors)	3	2017, 2022, 2023

== Magarey Medallists ==
The Magarey Medal is awarded to the fairest and most brilliant player in the SANFL. Men's League

1908	James Tierney
1909	Richard Head
1922	Robert Barnes
1926	Bruce McGregor
1927	Bruce McGregor
1929	Robert Snell
1931	Jack Sexton
1939	Ray McArthur
1957	Ron Benton
1962	Ken Eustice
1977	Trevor Grimwood
1985	Grantley Fielke
1995	Glenn Kilpatrick tied with Garry McIntosh (Norwood)
2009	James Ezard tied with Rhys Archard (North Adelaide)

2018	Hannah Martin
2020	Rachelle Martin tied with Anne Hatchard (North Adelaide)
2021	Lauren Young

== League top goalkickers ==
The Ken Farmer Medal is awarded to the SANFL's leading goalkicker at the end of the minor round.

Year	Player	Goals
1915	Francis Fitzgerald	31
1957	Peter Phipps	90
1998	Adam Richardson	85
1999	Adam Richardson	66
2000	Adam Richardson	72
2001	Adam Richardson	84
2003	Darren Bradshaw	97

== Jack Oatey Medallists ==
The Jack Oatey Medal is awarded to the best player of the SANFL Grand Final

1983	Ian Borchard
2015	Chris Schmidt

== Fos Williams Medallists ==
The Fos Williams Medal is awarded to the best SANFL player in an interstate game.

1983	Craig Williams
1988	Mark Mickan (Note: 1988 and 1996 matches were under State of Origin rules. At the time, Mark Mickan and Tony Modra were playing for VFL/AFL clubs the Brisbane Bears and Adelaide Crows respectively and not West Adelaide.)
1996	Tony Modra
2001 (Note: Donates state league match)	Ben Hollands
2002	Ben Hollands
2013	Ryan Ferguson
2015	Tom Keough

== Honour Board 1897–2026 ==
Indicates wooden spoon.
Indicates premiership or minor premiership.

Year	Ladder position	W–L–D	%	Finals	Coach	Captain(s)	Best & Fairest	Leading goalkicker	
1897	6th	1–15–1	20.1	—N/a	—N/a		—N/a		
1898	6th	0–14	20.1	DNQ	—N/a		—N/a	W Woods	5
1899	5th	4–8	37.7	DNQ	—N/a	J Daly (Note: In the early days of Australian rules football, there were no coaches and the captain carried out its function.)	—N/a	G Day	15
1900	5th	3–9	42.5	DNQ	—N/a	J Daly	—N/a	JP McKenna	14
1901	7th	3–9	41.3	3rd	—N/a	J Daly	—N/a	A Daly	23
1902	6th	1–10–1	31.5	DNQ	—N/a	J Daly	—N/a	Archie Watson	12
1903	6th	3–9	27.9	DNQ	—N/a	J Daly	—N/a	CV Fulton	7
1904	7th	1–11	27.9	DNQ	—N/a		—N/a	R McGargil	12
1905	7th	1–11	28.6	DNQ	—N/a		—N/a	J Lampre	10
1906	7th	0–12	26.9	DNQ	—N/a		—N/a	T Leahy	10
1907	6th	4–8	40.8	DNQ	—N/a	J Dailey		J Lampre	12
1907	6th	4–8	40.8	DNQ	—N/a	J Tierney		J Lampre	12
1908	2nd	10–2	56.1	Premiers	J Reedman	B Leahy	—N/a	B Moy	29
1909	2nd	8–4	56.2	Premiers	—N/a	B Leahy	—N/a	B Moy	20
1910	5th	4–7–1	45.1	DNQ	—N/a	J Dailey	—N/a	L Alcorn	14
1911	2nd	10–2	57.3	Premiers	—N/a	J Dailey	—N/a	TOB Lane	20
1912	2nd	7–5	52.5	Premiers	—N/a	J Dailey	—N/a	Alec Conlin	19
1913	2nd	9–3	54.8	Semi-finals	—N/a	R Head	—N/a	W Dowling	17
1914	5th	4–7–1	44.7	DNQ	—N/a	R Head	—N/a	J Keegan	15
1915	3rd	6–6	51.0	Semi-finals	—N/a	W A'Court	—N/a	F Fitzgerald	31
The SAFL was suspended between 1916 and 1918 due to World War I.
1919	6th	4–8	41.1	DNQ	—N/a	R Head	—N/a	N Macklin	23
1920	7th	2–9–1	40.6	DNQ	—N/a	R Head	—N/a	N Macklin	19
1921	7th	3–10–1	45.5	DNQ	—N/a	NV Peters	—N/a	N Macklin	28
1922	4th	7–7	51.7	Runners-up	S Hosking	NV Peters		W Martin	22
1922	4th	7–7	51.7	Runners-up	S Hosking	NV Peters		R Barnes	22
1923	6th	6–8	48.1	DNQ	S Hosking	R Barnes		W Martin	16
1923	6th	6–8	48.1	DNQ	S Hosking	R Barnes		G Whitford	16
1924	7th	3–11	41.7	DNQ	S Hosking	NV Peters	—N/a	R Barnes	17
1925	5th	7–7	50.5	DNQ	JM Hamilton	NV Peters	—N/a	W Martin	12
1926	6th	7–7	51.5	DNQ	B McGregor		—N/a	B McGregor	26
1927	1st	14–3	57.2	Premiers	B McGregor		—N/a	EJ Bennetts	51
1928	2nd	13–4	58.0	Semi-finals	B McGregor		—N/a	EJ Bennetts	76
1929	3rd	10–7	50.6	Semi-finals	B McGregor		—N/a	EJ Bennetts	67
1930	5th	8–9	47.4	DNQ	—N/a	H Solomon	—N/a	E Hill	23
1931	8th	2–15	41.8	DNQ	—N/a	H Solomon		H Graham	30
1931	8th	2–15	41.8	DNQ	—N/a	J Connell		H Graham	30
1931	8th	2–15	41.8	DNQ	—N/a	CL Shea		H Graham	30
1932	5th	9–8	50.7	DNQ	—N/a	CL Shea	—N/a	J Bottomley	38
1933	8th	0–17	43.4	DNQ	W Scott	J Connell	—N/a	EJ Bennetts	74
1934	6th	8–8–1	50.4	DNQ	W Scott	M Jarvis	—N/a	EJ Bennetts	86
1935	7th	4–13	42.9	DNQ	W Scott	CW Bennett	—N/a	EJ Bennetts	82
1936	8th	2–15	35.0	DNQ	JJ Baker	JF Bennett	—N/a	R Beaton	24
1937	7th	4–13	42.9	DNQ	B McGregor	R Webber	R McArthur	RG Thatcher	25
1938	7th	4–13	43.0	DNQ	B McGregor	BH Mattiske		W Isaac	57
1938	7th	4–13	43.0	DNQ	B McGregor	C Smith		W Isaac	57
1939	7th	5–12	47.4	DNQ	B McGregor	R Codd		J Coad	30
1939	7th	5–12	47.4	DNQ	B McGregor	R Codd		H Langton	30
1940	5th	6–10–1	48.0	DNQ	C Gaudion			H Langton	60
1941	3rd	11–5–1	51.5	Preliminary final	B McGregor; C Smith	C Smith		H Langton	70
West Adelaide combined with Glenelg between 1942 and 1944 due to World War II.
1945	6th	7–10	45.2	DNQ	H Lee	J Taylor	G Burkett	R McArthur	42
1946	3rd	11–6	54.6	Preliminary final	G Scott	G Scott	G Burkett	J Coad	50
1947	4th	10–7	53.2	Premiers	G Scott	J Taylor	B Smith	R Zeuner	53
1948	3rd	11–6	53.2	Preliminary final	J Taylor		C Brown	J Atkins	57
1949	4th	11–6	53.4	Semi-finals	J Taylor	F Lewis	J Coad	J Coad	38
1950	6th	9–8	52.0	DNQ	J Broadstock		B Faehse	B Slattery	28
1951	6th	8–10	46.9	DNQ	B Faehse		B Faehse	M Agars	22
1952	6th	6–11	47.1	DNQ	B Faehse		J Lynch	G Williams	26
1953	6th	5–13	47.0	DNQ	L Cahill	B Faehse	C Brown	C Brown	42
1954	2nd	13–5	52.3	Runners-up	L Cahill	B Faehse	C Brown	K McGregor	33
1955	7th	7–10	46.7	DNQ	L Cahill	B Faehse	G Williams	J Wright	33
1956	2nd	12–5–1	56.5	Runners-up	L Cahill	B Faehse	S Costello	I Day	29
1956	2nd	12–5–1	56.5	Runners-up	L Cahill	B Faehse	A Rossetto	I Day	29
1957	2nd	12–6	54.3	Preliminary final	J Oatey	C Brown	R Benton	P Phipps	90
1958	2nd	15–3	56.8	Runners-up	J Oatey	C Brown	N Kerley	J Wright	52
1959	2nd	12–6	58.3	Runners-up	J Oatey	N Kerley	N Kerley	J Wright	55
1960	4th	11–7	52.5	Semi-finals	J Oatey	N Kerley	J Bray	J Brad	40
1961	2nd	14–5	58.7	Premiers	N Kerley		N Kerley	F Hogan	46
1962	2nd	13–6	58.7	Runners-up	N Kerley		N Kerley	F Hogan	47
1963	4th	12–8	53.7	Semi-finals	D Thomas		J Bray	R Benton	29
1964	7th	8–12	48.10	DNQ	D Thomas		R Pope	D Bertelsmeier	36
1965	9th	4–16	43.2	DNQ	D Taylor	D Thomas	R Day	A Bitmead	34
1966	6th	10–10	48.8	DNQ	D Roach		R Day	G Sims	61
1967	7th	9–11	50.8	DNQ	D Roach		T Hughes	G Sims	52
1968	4th	12–8	52.0	Semi-finals	M Weideman		R Pope	J Pannenburg	28
1969	3rd	15–5	54.9	Preliminary final	M Weideman		G Wallis	D Jonas	54
1970	6th	8–11–1	45.3	DNQ	M Weideman	R Day	R Day	D Jonas	56
1971	8th	6–15	45.7	DNQ	M Weideman	R Loveday	S Fraser	D Jonas	46
1972	10th	4–16–1	44.4	DNQ	R Loveday		G Nicholson	G Hewitt	62
1973	10th	3–17–1	42.4	DNQ	R Keddie		R Keddie	R Loveday	39
1974	10th	4–18	40.5	DNQ	F Williams	R Loveday	R Loveday	R Loveday	51
1975	6th	7–11	48.4	DNQ	F Williams	R Loveday	R Loveday	G Hewitt	45
1976	4th	12–9	53.0	Elimination final	F Williams	R Loveday	T Grimwood	T Pierson	57
1977	3rd	15–10	54.6	Preliminary final	F Williams	R Loveday	T Grimwood	T Pierson	68
1978	9th	5–16–1	47.5	DNQ	F Williams	R Loveday	D Kennedy	P Meuret	36
1979	10th	7–14–1	48.3	DNQ	T Hughes	K J Beswick	M Gregg	T Pierson	59
1979	10th	7–14–1	48.3	DNQ	T Hughes	K J Beswick	M Gregg	R Luders	59
1980	9th	6–16	43.0	DNQ	T Hughes	K J Beswick	I Borchard	R Luders	43
1981	5th	11–10–1	52.8	Elimination final	N Kerley	I Borchard	J Kantilaftas	R Luders	72
1982	6th	13–9	52.0	DNQ	N Kerley	I Borchard	I Borchard	R Luders	75
1983	1st	18–4	57.1	Premiers	N Kerley	I Borchard	M Mickan	R Luders	105
1984	6th	10–12	47.7	DNQ	N Kerley	I Borchard	D Herbert	R Luders	75
1985	4th	13–9	52.3	Preliminary final	J Cahill	I Borchard	M Mickan	R Andrews	51
1986	7th	9–13	51.3	DNQ	J Cahill	M Mickan	M Mickan	P Meuret	55
1987	7th	10–12	49.1	DNQ	J Cahill	L Grosser	K Sporn	D Twomey	56
1988	8th	9–13	46.8	DNQ	K Morris	P Winter	N Shaw	C Lamb	38
1989	7th	8–14	48.5	DNQ	K Morris	C Lamb	N Shaw	L Grosser	35
1990	6th	8–11–1	46.4	DNQ	K Morris	L Grosser	G Fielke	G Goss	35
1991	5th	12–10	50.7	Runners-up	K Morris	L Grosser	P Banfield	G Mellor	53
1992	6th	10–12	49.7	DNQ	N Kerley	L Grosser	L Grosser	A Modra	53
1993	8th	4–16	42.7	DNQ	N Kerley	L Grosser	M Mickan	C Palmer	47
1994	8th	9–13	46.4	DNQ	G Morris	G Fielke	J Andriske	S Simister	72
1995	5th	11–10–1	52.7	Elimination final	G Morris	G Fielke	A Banik	S Simister	65
1996	5th	10–10	52.6	Elimination final	M Taylor	G Fielke	B Fogden	S Simister	51
1997	6th	8–11–1	48.3	DNQ	M Taylor	G Mellor	A Banik	E Richardson	30
1998	2nd	14–9	52.6	Preliminary final	M Taylor	G Mellor	A Richardson	A Richardson	85
1999	6th	10–10	52.3	DNQ	M Taylor	G Mellor	T Symes	A Richardson	66
2000	7th	8–12	46.7	DNQ	M Taylor	G Mellor	D Myles	A Richardson	72
2001	4th	11–9	51.8	Elimination final	I Borchard	G Mellor	B Hollands	A Richardson	84
2002	5th	10–10	49.7	Elimination final	I Borchard	A Richardson	C Chubb	A Richardson	40
2003	2nd	15–5	55.3	Runners-up	S Rehn	E Richardson	D Bradshaw	D Bradshaw	97
2004	5th	8–12	44.3	Elimination final	S Rehn	L Norman	L Norman	P Shepherd	32
2005	9th	3–17	38.0	DNQ	S Rehn	L Norman	J Porplyzia	P Wiggins	31
2006	9th	2–18	39.3	DNQ	W Weidemann	D Piasente	B Haynes	B Haynes	48
2007	9th	3–17	38.5	DNQ	W Weidemann	D Piasente	S McCormick	D Cupido	37
2008	9th	2–18	39.2	DNQ	A Collins	N Brown	R Ferguson	R Willits	20
2009	6th	7–12–1	44.5	DNQ	A Collins	R Ferguson	R Ferguson	R Willits	29
2010	6th	10–10	48.1	DNQ	A Collins	R Ferguson	D Caire	R Bennetts	30
2011	7th	8–12	47.6	DNQ	A Collins	R Ferguson	S Morris	B Fisher	33
2012	3rd	12–8	52.6	Runners-up	A Collins	R Ferguson	R Ferguson	B Fisher	48
2013	3rd	12–8	56.3	Preliminary final	A Collins	R Ferguson	R Ferguson	J Beech	36
2013	3rd	12–8	56.3	Preliminary final	A Collins	R Ferguson	C Schmidt	J Beech	36
2014	9th	6–12	44.4	DNQ	M Mickan	C Schmidt	J Beech	J Beech	18
2014	9th	6–12	44.4	DNQ	M Mickan	C Schmidt	J Beech	M Still	18
2015	3rd	11–7	54.9	Premiers	M Mickan	C Schmidt	J Porplyzia	S Green	45
2016	10th	2–16	34.8	DNQ	M Mickan	C Schmidt	C Schmidt	A Fielke	18
2017	9th	5–13	42.1	DNQ	M Mickan	C Schmidt	K Stevens	S Green	19
2018	7th	8–10	47.1	DNQ	G Colville	T Keough	K Stevens	M Middleton	30
2019	10th	2–16	38.8	DNQ	G Colville	T Keough	L Hill	J Beech	21
2020	8th	2–11–1	40.4	DNQ	G Colville	T Keough	I Johnson	T Keough	18
2021	10th	2–16	39.3	DNQ	B Gotch	T Keough	T Keough	T Keough	30
2021	10th	2–16	39.3	DNQ	B Gotch	T Keough	L Hill	T Keough	30
2022	10th	3–15	41.9	DNQ	B Gotch	T Keough	H Hartlett	J Gore	28
2023	10th	4–13–1	45.8	DNQ	A Hartlett	K Brand	J Ryan	L Delahunty	27
2024	8th	5–13	43.6	DNQ	A Hartlett	I Johnson	S Frost	N Stevens	15
2024	8th	5–13	43.6	DNQ	A Hartlett	I Johnson	K Ryan	N Stevens	15
2025	10th	3–15	36.8	DNQ	A Hartlett	S Frost	T Morrish	T Scully	30
2025	10th	3–15	36.8	DNQ	A Hartlett	I Johnson	T Morrish	T Scully	30
2026	5th	8–9–1	49.7	Elimination final	N Bassett	S Frost	C Burgess; K Ryan	T Scully	28

== Hall of Fame ==
West Adelaide's Hall of Fame includes:

- Ron Benton
- Ian Borchard
- Jeff Bray
- Colin Brown
- John Broadstock
- Jos Dailey
- Robert Day
- W. H. "Shrimp" Dowling
- Ken Eglington
- Brian Faehse (Legend)
- Grantley Fielke (Legend)
- Leon Grosser
- H R "Dick" Head
- Anthony "Tony" Kenny
- Neil Kerley (Legend)
- Dexter Kennedy
- Bob Lee
- Bruce Lindner
- Bob Loveday
- Roger Luders
- Jack Lynch
- Bruce McGregor
- Robin McKinnon
- Peter Meuret
- Mark Mickan
- Geoff Morris
- Rodney Pope
- Don Roach
- Cliff Semmler
- Bernie Smith
- Colin Smith
- Johnny Taylor
- Doug Thomas
- Fred Winter
- Jimmy Wright
- Harry Hutton

== Club records ==
- South Australian Premiers: 9 – 1908, 1909, 1911, 1912, 1927, 1947, 1961, 1983, 2015
- Runners-up: 9 – 1922, 1954, 1956, 1958, 1959, 1962, 1991, 2003, 2012
- Champions of Australia: 2 – 1908, 1911
- Foxtel Cup Champions: 1 – 2013
- South Australian Night Series Champions: 6 – 1955, 1957, 1960, 1962, 1985, 1987
- Home ground: Richmond Oval (1958–present)
- Previous grounds: Kensington Oval (1897), Jubilee Oval (1898–1906), Adelaide Oval (1907–1926, 1940–1957), Wayville Showgrounds (1927–1939)
- First game at Richmond Oval: 12.11 (83) d. West Torrens 10.13 (73) in 1958
- Record attendance at Hisense Stadium: 15,742 v Glenelg in Round 5, 1969
- Record night attendance at Hisense Stadium: 6,133 v North Adelaide on 26 March 2010
- Record attendance: 54,282 v Port Adelaide at Adelaide Oval, 1958 SANFL Grand Final
- Record attendance at Football Park: 47,129 v Sturt, 1983 SANFL Grand Final
- Record attendance since Adelaide Crows (AFL) formation (1991): 39,276 v North Adelaide at Football Park, 1991 SANFL Grand Final
- Record attendance since Port Adelaide (AFL) entry (1997): 29,661 v Norwood at AAMI Stadium, 2012 SANFL Grand Final
- Most games: 327 by Grantley Fielke (1979–86, 1988–90, 1992–97) (Note: Games and goals totals refer to premiership matches (home-and-away and finals matches) only.)
- Most goals in a season: 105 by Roger Luders in 1983 (24 games)
- Most goals for the club: 506 by Roger Luders 1978–87 (144 games)
- Most goals by a player in a match:
  - 12 by Hubert Langton v North Adelaide, Round 2, 1941
  - 12 by Adam Richardson v Port Adelaide, Round 23, 2000
  - 12 by Adam Richardson v South Adelaide, Round 6, 2001
- First player to kick 100 goals in an SANFL season: Roger Luders (1983; 105 goals)
- Most seasons as coach: 8 by Bruce McGregor (1926–29, 1937–39, 1941) and Neil Kerley (1961–62, 1981–84, 1992–93)
- Most premierships as coach: 2 by Neil Kerley (1961, 1983)
- Most seasons as captain: 7 by Bob Loveday (1971–72, 1974–78)
- Most premierships as captain: 2 by Bernie Leahy (1908, 1909) and Jos Dailey (1911, 1912)
- Most premierships as a Player: 4 by Jos Dailey, W. Dowling, H. R. Head, J. J. McCarthy and T. Moore (1908, 1909, 1911, 1912)
- Most Best & Fairest Awards (Note: Bruce McGregor is believed to have won 6 Best All-Round Player awards before the B&F was first awarded in 1945): 4 by Neil Kerley (1958, 1959, 1961, 1962), Mark Mickan (1983, 1985, 1986, 1993) and Ryan Ferguson (2008, 2009, 2012, 2013)
- All-Australians: Jack Lynch (1953), Stan Costello (1956), Neil Kerley (1961), Don Roach (1961), Robert Day (1966), Geoff Morris (1979), Craig Williams (1983)
- Highest Score: 36.21 (237) v West Torrens 16.5 (101) at Richmond Oval in Round 8, 1982

== 1983 premiership side ==
West Adelaide 21.16 (142) defeated Sturt 16.12 (108)
Venue: Football Park
Attendance: 47,129
Umpires: Laurie Argent and Rick Kinnear
Jack Oatey Medallist: Ian Borchard

1983 Premiership Team
B:	John Kantilaftas	Tony Burgess	Peter Winter
HB:	Larry Watson	Mark Dreher	Greg Summerton
C:	Robin McKinnon	Richard Hamilton	Randall Bennett
HF:	Mike Smith	Bruce Lindner	Geoff Morris (vc)
F:	Craig Williams	Roger Luders	Leon Grosser
Foll:	Dirk de Jong	Ian Borchard (c)	Bernie Conlen
Int:	Grantley Fielke	Peter Meuret	
Coach:	Neil Kerley		

Best: Borchard, Morris, Bennett, Meuret, Grosser, McKinnon, Kantilaftas, McKinnon, Burgess, Winter
Goals: Lindner 5, Luders & Grosser 4, Meuret 3, Morris 2, Conlen, Smith & Borchard 1

== 2015 premiership side ==
West Adelaide 11.12 (78) defeated Woodville West Torrens 7.6 (48)
Venue: Adelaide Oval
Attendance: 25,625
Umpires: Tobias Medlin, Craig Fleer and Leigh Haussen
Jack Oatey Medallist: Chris Schmidt

2015 Premiership Team
B:	Daniel Caire (vc)	Tom Keough	Brad Helbig
HB:	Jason Porplyzia	Adam Hartlett	Errin Wasley-Black
C:	Taite Silverlock	Kaine Stevens	Josh Schiller
HF:	Shannon Green	Travis Tuck	Jonathan Beech
F:	Hugh Haysman	Logan Hill	Aaron Fielke
Foll:	Daniel Webb	Chris Schmidt (c)	Will Snelling
Int:	Ryan Willits	Aaron Anderson	Riley Milne
Int:	Nick Homburg	Mason Middleton	
Coach:	Mark Mickan		

Best: Schmidt, Porplyzia, Stevens, Schiller, Tuck, Helbig
Goals: Green 3, Beech & Webb 2, Fielke, Stevens, Tuck & Wasley-Black 1

== Club song ==
Sung to the tune of "The Yankee Doodle Boy".

We're a happy team at Westies,

We're the mighty fighting Bloods,

We love our club and we play to win,

Riding the bumps with a grin,

At Westies

Come what may you'll find us striving,

Team work is the thing that counts,

All for one and one for all,

The way we play at Westies

We are the mighty fighting Blood and tars!

See also "West Adelaide Football Rally" by Reginald A A Stoneham (1895–1942)

== AFL/VFL players (including Rookies) ==
There is a list of past and present West Adelaide players who have played at AFL/VFL:

- Ron Andrews (Essendon and Collingwood)
- Brett Backwell (Carlton)
- Peter Banfield (Essendon and Brisbane Lions)
- Anthony Banik (Richmond)
- Shane Birss (Western Bulldogs and St. Kilda)
- Riley Bonner (Port Adelaide)
- Ian Borchard (Richmond)
- Darren Bradshaw (Brisbane Lions)
- Jeff Bray (1938–2006) (South Melbourne)
- Jeff Broadstock (1920–1995) (Richmond)
- Kaiden Brand - Hawthorn
- Nathan Brown (Melbourne)
- George Bruce (1879–1928) (Carlton)
- Les Bryant (1896–1965) (Fitzroy)
- Tony Burgess (Collingwood)
- Darren Carlson (Brisbane Bears)
- Domenic Cassisi (Port Adelaide)
- Bernie Conlen (South Melbourne)
- Adam Cooney (Western Bulldogs and Essendon)
- Brad Crouch (Adelaide)
- Damian Cupido (Brisbane Lions and Essendon)
- Mitch Robinson (Carlton)
- Patrick Dangerfield (Adelaide and Geelong)
- Jason Davenport (Port Adelaide)
- Brad Davis (Fitzroy)
- Robert Day - Hawthorn
- Will Day - Hawthorn
- Mark Dreher (Collingwood)
- Nathan Eagleton (Port Adelaide and Western Bulldogs)
- Tyson Edwards (Adelaide)
- James Ezard (Port Adelaide)
- Bob Farmer (Collingwood)
- Ryan Ferguson (Melbourne)
- Grantley Fielke (Collingwood and Adelaide)
- Sam Fisher (St. Kilda)
- Aaron Francis (Essendon)
- Robbie Gray (Port Adelaide)
- Steven Hamilton (North Melbourne)
- Merv Harbinson (Essendon)
- Tom Hart (1896–1971) (Carlton)
- Adam Hartlett (Carlton)
- Hamish Hartlett (Port Adelaide)
- Brad Helbig (Richmond)
- Carl Herbert (Collingwood)
- Des Herbert (Collingwood and Fitzroy)
- Eddie Hocking (Adelaide)
- Ben Hollands (Richmond)
- Greg Hollick (Richmond)
- Harry House (1919–2006) (St. Kilda)
- Darryl Hewitt (St. Kilda)
- Glynn Hewitt (Richmond)
- Dean Howard (Adelaide)
- Bill Hudson (1920–1945) (St. Kilda)
- Luke Jericho (Adelaide)
- Bert Johnson (North Melbourne)
- Bob Keddie (Hawthorn)
- Michael Kennedy (Brisbane Bears)
- Glenn Kilpatrick (Essendon and Geelong)
- Rory Laird (Adelaide)
- Clayton Lamb (Adelaide)
- Bruce Lindner (Geelong and Adelaide)
- Matthew Lobbe (Port Adelaide)
- Joe Lukeman (1901–1993) (Footscray)
- Ben Marsh (Adelaide and Richmond)
- Mark Mickan (Brisbane Bears and Adelaide)
- Neville Miller (South Melbourne)
- Riley Milne (Hawthorn)
- Tony Modra (Adelaide and Fremantle)
- Harry Morgan (1889–1956) (South Melbourne and Carlton)
- Steven Morris (Richmond)
- Marlon Motlop (Port Adelaide)
- Damien Murray (North Melbourne)
- Matthew Nicks (Sydney Swans)
- Luke Norman (Melbourne)
- Seff Parry (1907–1980) (Fitzroy)
- Paul Patterson (Adelaide)
- Michael Pettigrew (Port Adelaide)
- Jason Porplyzia (Adelaide)
- Bert Rapiport (1865–1913) (Fitzroy)
- Shaun Rehn (Adelaide and Hawthorn)
- Mark Ricciuto (Adelaide)
- Adam Richardson (Adelaide)
- Don Roach (1940–2011) (Hawthorn)
- Lachlan Ross (Essendon)
- Sean Rusling (Collingwood)
- Jordan Russell (Carlton and Collingwood)
- Ben Rutten (Adelaide)
- Byron Schammer (Fremantle)
- Chris Schmidt (Brisbane Lions and Adelaide)
- Tim Schmidt (Sydney Swans)
- Jack Sexton (1907–1935) (Fitzroy)
- Neville Shaw (Collingwood)
- Jarrod Silvester (Richmond)
- Matthew Simpson (Brisbane Bears)
- Henry Slattery (Essendon)
- Tyson Slattery (Essendon)
- Bernie Smith (1927–1985) (Geelong)
- Jesse D. Smith (Carlton)
- Michael Smith (South Melbourne)
- Roy Snell (1901–1977) (Fitzroy)
- Will Snelling (Port Adelaide and Essendon)
- Kieran Sporn (Essendon and Fitzroy)
- Rhys Stanley (St. Kilda and Geelong)
- Bruce Stevenson (Hawthorn)
- Don Taylor (1920–1994) (South Melbourne)
- Laurie Taylor (1918–1980) (Richmond)
- Les Thomas (1906–1997) (Collingwood)
- Stephen Tiller (Western Bulldogs)
- Joel Tippett (Gold Coast and North Melbourne)
- Kurt Tippett (Adelaide and Sydney Swans)
- Gerard Toohey (Geelong)
- Shane Tuck (1981–2020) (Richmond)
- Travis Tuck (Hawthorn)
- Gary Wallis (Collingwood and St. Kilda)
- Peter Walsh (Melbourne and Port Adelaide)
- Larry Weideman (Essendon and Fitzroy)
- Mark Weideman (Collingwood)
- Beau Waters (West Coast Eagles)
- Scott Welsh (North Melbourne/Kangaroos, Adelaide and Western Bulldogs)
- Darren Wheildon (Fitzroy)
- Brent Williams (Adelaide)
- Craig Williams (St. Kilda)
- Mark Williams (Collingwood and Brisbane Bears)
- Ryan Willits (Port Adelaide)
- Cameron Wood (Brisbane Lions, Collingwood and Carlton)
- Dale Woodhall (Collingwood)
- Alby Yeo (Essendon)

== Influence and supporters ==
The black and red colours of West End beer made by the South Australian Brewing Company came about after West Adelaide defeated Port Adelaide in the 1911 Grand Final, and defeated VFL premiers Essendon in the Championship of Australia play-off at Adelaide Oval shortly afterwards in the same year.

Despite the SANFL being a localised league, West Adelaide have some high-profile Adelaide personalities as supporters of the club. Former Premier of South Australia (1996–2001) John Olsen AO, the current SANFL President and Chairman of the SA Football Commission, and former South Australian Sheffield Shield cricketer and SANFL umpire turned Adelaide television and radio personality K. G. Cunningham, are known to be proud Bloods fans.

== Miscellaneous ==
A song written dedicated to the West Adelaide Team by Reg Stoneham 1911. Scan of the sheet music
