= Darren Bradshaw (Australian footballer) =

Australian rules footballer

Personal information
- Full name: Darren John Bradshaw
- Born: 5 November 1980 (age 45)
- Original team: Wodonga
- Height: 185 cm (6 ft 1 in)
- Weight: 90 kg (198 lb)

Playing career^{1}
Years	Club	Games (Goals)
2002	Brisbane Lions	1 (0)
- ^{1} Playing statistics correct to the end of 2002.

Darren Bradshaw (born 5 November 1980) is an Australian rules footballer who played for the Brisbane Lions in the Australian Football League (AFL).

Bradshaw joined Brisbane from Wodonga, during their run of three successive premierships. As a result, he found it difficult to break into the team, playing his first and only AFL game when his brother and fellow forward Daniel Bradshaw was omitted. In a win over Richmond at Docklands in 2002, Bradshaw had just three disposals and was delisted at the end of the year.

Recruited by South Australian National Football League (SANFL) club West Adelaide in 2003, Bradshaw kicked 88 goals after the home and away season to win the Ken Farmer Medal and booted 97 goals in total, after appearing in a Grand Final loss to Central District. He also won West Adelaide's Best & Fairest award. He later played for Howlong in the Hume Football League
