= Ron Andrews =

Australian rules footballer (born 1955)

Personal information
- Born: 13 May 1955 (age 71)
- Original team: Redan (Ballarat FL)
- Height: 191 cm (6 ft 3 in)
- Weight: 87 kg (192 lb)

Playing career^{1}
Years	Club	Games (Goals)
1973–1983	Essendon	151 (32)
1984	Collingwood	6 (8)
Total		157 (40)
- ^{1} Playing statistics correct to the end of 1984.

Ron Andrews (born 13 May 1955) is a former Australian rules footballer who played with Essendon and Collingwood in the VFL.

Andrews was a centre half-back and had a reputation throughout his career as being a tough and uncompromising player. A regular visitor to the VFL tribunal, he missed a total of 24 games through suspension, with perhaps the most notable suspension coming in the aftermath of the 'Windy Hill Brawl' in 1974. At half-time in that game against Richmond, he king hit an opponent and was subsequently suspended for six weeks.

He played his best football in the late 1970s, finishing second in Essendon's 1976 best and fairest and representing the Victorian interstate team in 1977 and 1978. In the 1982 season he was club captain and led them into the finals before losing to North Melbourne in the Elimination Final.

Andrews crossed to Collingwood in 1984 after missing out on selection in Essendon's Grand Final side the previous September. He remained at Collingwood for just one season and then joined West Adelaide in the SANFL and topped their goalkicking in his first year with 51 goals.
