= Trevor Grimwood =

Australian rules footballer

Personal information
- Full name: Trevor Foster Grimwood
- Born: 8 November 1948 (age 77)
- Original team: Meadows

Playing career^{1}
Years	Club	Games (Goals)
1971–1973	Port Adelaide	33 (30)
1974–1979	West Adelaide	101 (131)
Total		134 (161)
- ^{1} Playing statistics correct to the end of 1979.

Trevor Foster Grimwood (born 8 November 1948) is a former Australian rules footballer who played with Port Adelaide and West Adelaide in the SANFL.

Grimwood's first attempt at a career in the SANFL was unsuccessful, he was on the books for Norwood in both 1965 and 1966 but didn't play a senior game. A rover, he got his second chance in 1971 when he was picked up by Port Adelaide with whom he would play 33 games over three years. In 1974 he crossed to West Adelaide and won their best and fairest award in 1976. His best season came the following season when he won the 1977 Magarey Medal by ten votes. Grimwood finished with 101 games for West Adelaide; he would have played more if he had not suffered from constant hamstring problems.

On 28 November 2011, Grimwood was sentenced to six years imprisonment with a non-parole period of 2 1/2 years for having sexual intercourse with a 14-year-old girl in 1985 and 1986.
