= Ray McArthur =

Australian rules footballer

Personal information
- Full name: Raymond John McArthur
- Born: 25 June 1917; Rose Park, South Australia
- Died: 5 August 1974 (aged 57)

Playing career^{1}
Years	Club	Games (Goals)
1935–1946	West Adelaide	152 (-)
- ^{1} Playing statistics correct to the end of 1946.

Raymond John McArthur (25 June 1917 – 5 August 1974) was an Australian rules footballer who played with West Adelaide in the SANFL.

McArthur played in many positions during his career, including ruckman. He made his debut in 1935 and was West Adelaide's best and fairest winner two years later. In 1939, he tied in the voting for the Magarey Medal with Jeff Pash but lost the award after an additional count. He was, however, awarded a retrospective Magarey Medal in 1998.

During World War II, McArthur played with the combined West Adelaide–Glenelg side before resuming with West Adelaide when the war ended. He topped West's goalkicking in 1945 with 42 goals before retiring at the end of the following season, finishing with 152 games. On four occasions during his career he represented South Australia at interstate football.
