= Ken Eustice =

Australian rules footballer and coach

Personal information
- Full name: Kenneth James Eustice
- Positions: Half-back flank, centre

Playing career^{1}
Years	Club	Games (Goals)
1958–63	West Adelaide	110 (18)
1964–67	Central District	62 (13)
1968–70	Glenelg	52 (20)

Coaching career
Years	Club	Games (W–L–D)
1964–67	Central District	80 (17–63–0)
- ^{1} Playing statistics correct to the end of 1970.

Career highlights
- West Adelaide premiership player 1961; Magarey Medallist 1962; Central District best and fairest 1967; Glenelg best and fairest 1969; 25 State games for South Australia (captain: 1967); West Adelaide club president 1973–75; South Australian Football Hall of Fame inaugural inductee 2002

Kenneth James Eustice is a former Australian rules footballer who played with West Adelaide, Central District and Glenelg in the South Australian National Football League (SANFL).

Eustice started his career in 1958 with West Adelaide and was a member of their premiership side in 1961. He usually played on the wing at West Adelaide and it was in that position that he won the 1962 Magarey Medal. During his time as captain-coach at Central District he played as a centreman and won their best and fairest award in 1967. He was also a best and fairest winner at Glenelg, taking out the award in 1969 as he neared the end of his 224-game SANFL career. A regular for South Australia at interstate football, Eustice was used mostly as a half back flanker.
