= Geoff Morris (Australian footballer) =

Australian rules footballer and coach

Personal information
- Full name: Geoffrey Paul Morris
- Born: 3 October 1954 (age 72); Mount Gambier
- Original team: Plympton High
- Position: Wing / Half-forward flank

Playing career^{1}
| Years | Club | Games (Goals) |
| 1973–86 | West Adelaide (SANFL) | 220 (316) |

Coaching career
| Years | Club | Games (W–L–D) |
| 1994–95 | West Adelaide (SANFL) | 51 (20–30–1) |
- ^{1} Playing statistics correct to the end of 1986.

Career highlights
- SANFL debut with West Adelaide on 7 April 1973; All-Australian, 1979; West Adelaide Premiership Player 1983; SANFL Player Life Member; West Adelaide Football Club Life Member 1979; West Adelaide Football Club Hall of Fame member

Geoffrey Paul Morris (born 3 October 1954) is a former Australian rules footballer who played 220 games and kicked 316 goals for West Adelaide in the South Australian National Football League (SANFL) between 1973 and 1986.

== Career ==
Born in South Australia's second-most-populous city, Mount Gambier, Morris, a left footer, spent most of his time either on the Wing or as a half-forward flanker. He played the game aggressively and was always hard on the ball. As a result he was particularly injury prone and over the course of his career suffered many injuries including broken legs, a broken jaw and broken wrist. In 1983 he was a member of West's premiership side which defeated Sturt in the Grand Final, having to overcome a hamstring injury to be passed fit to play. To do this Morris spent a lot of grand final week at the Morphettville Racecourse stables using machines used on horses in a successful bid to play. Wests coach Neil Kerley showed faith in Morris who didn't let his coach or team mates down and was one of the team's best players on the day. Kerley finally took Morris off the ground midway through the final quarter when The Bloods had the game well in hand.

He took part in the 1979 State of Origin Carnival in Perth, the first ever National Carnival held under State of Origin rules, and was selected to the All-Australian team.

Early in 1985, prior to the beginning of the season, Morris was involved in a motor boat accident which left him with serious burns. He returned late in the 1985 season and made a handful of appearances off the bench that year and in 1986 but never fully recovered enough to fully resurrect his SANFL career. After leaving West Adelaide, Morris played briefly in the Northern Territory with the Wanderers Football Club.

== Coaching ==
Geoff Morris served as West Adelaide's head coach in 1994 and 1995, taking the club to 8th and 5th in his two seasons in charge. Following his stint back at Westies Morris became an assistant coach with Port Adelaide in the Australian Football League.
