= Ian Borchard =

Australian rules footballer

Personal information
- Full name: Ian Alfred Borchard
- Born: 5 August 1957 (age 69); Swan Hill, Victoria
- Original team: Swan Hill
- Height: 177 cm (5 ft 10 in)
- Weight: 76 kg (168 lb)
- Position: Ruck-rover

Playing career^{1}
Years	Club	Games (Goals)
1976, 1978	Richmond (VFL)	5 (2)
1978	South Fremantle (WAFL)	1 (0)
1979–86	West Adelaide (SANFL)	145 (80)
Total		151 (82)

Coaching career
Years	Club	Games (W–L–D)
2001–02	West Adelaide (SANFL)	42 (21–21–0)
- ^{1} Playing statistics correct to the end of 1986.

Career highlights
- VFL debut with Richmond on 14 August 1976 v South Melbourne at MCG; WAFL debut with South Fremantle in 1978; SANFL debut with West Adelaide on 19 May 1979; West Adelaide Best & Fairest 1980, 1982; West Adelaide Club Captain 1981-85; West Adelaide Premiership Player 1983; SANFL Jack Oatey Medallist 1983; West Adelaide Football Club Hall of Fame Inaugural Inductee 2005

Ian Alfred Borchard (born 5 August 1957) is a former Australian rules footballer who played with Richmond in the Victorian Football League (VFL) during the 1970s. He also played for West Adelaide in the South Australian National Football League (SANFL).

== Playing career ==
=== VFL ===
Borchard, originally from Swan Hill in Victoria, spent three seasons at Richmond. In the last of those years, 1978, Borchard was cleared to play for South Fremantle in the Western Australian Football League (WAFL) midway through the season, but only lasted one week before he returned to Richmond on 29 June.

=== SANFL ===
He joined West Adelaide in 1979 and the following season won the first of his two Best & Fairest awards, the other coming in 1982. In 1981, Wests coach Neil Kerley appointed Borchard as captain West Adelaide, with the highlight being the 1983 premiership where he won the Jack Oatey Medal as the player of the match in the Grand Final win over Sturt at Football Park in front of 47,129 fans. Borchard remained captain of The Bloods until the end of the 1985 season when they finished in third place, beaten in the Preliminary final by North Adelaide.

After the premiership win in 1983, Borchard began to be plagued by injury, only playing in 14 games in 1984, 17 in 1985 when West reached the preliminary final. In 1986, Bloods coach John Cahill replaced Borchard as club captain with Mark Mickan, with injury restricting him to just 3 games for the year. Following the 1986 season, Borchard retired from league football.

== Coaching ==
In late 2000 Ian Borchard was appointed coach of West Adelaide. He coached the Bloods to fifth place and the SANFL finals in both 2001 and 2002. After laying the groundwork for a good side, Borchard was replaced as coach of West Adelaide from the 2003 season by former Adelaide Crows and West Adelaide player Shaun Rehn, who in his first season coached the Bloods to their first SANFL Grand Final appearance since 1991.
