= Craig Williams (Australian footballer) =

Australian rules footballer

Personal information
- Full name: Craig Williams
- Born: 14 August 1954 (age 72)
- Original team: Prahran (VFA)
- Height: 187 cm (6 ft 2 in)
- Weight: 81 kg (12 st 11 lb; 179 lb)
- Position: Fullback / Ruckman / Utility

Playing career^{1}
Years	Club	Games (Goals)
1977	St Kilda (VFL)	8 (5)
1978–79	Fitzroy (VFL)	0 (0)
1980–89	West Adelaide (SANFL)	160 (50)
Total		168 (55)
- ^{1} Playing statistics correct to the end of 1989.

Career highlights
- VFL debut with St Kilda on 7 May 1977 v Hawthorn at Princes Park; SANFL debut with West Adelaide on 26 April 1980; West Adelaide Premiership Player 1983; South Australian State of Origin Representative 1983, 1986; Fos Williams Medallist 1983 SA v WA at Subiaco Oval; All-Australian 1983

Craig Williams (born 14 August 1954) is a former Australian rules footballer who played a season with St Kilda in the VFL. He also played for West Adelaide in the SANFL for the entire 1980s.

== Career ==
=== VFL ===
St Kilda recruited Williams from Victorian Football Association (VFA) club Prahran and he played eight games in the 1977 VFL season. He left St Kilda at the end of the year and crossed to Fitzroy but failed to make the seniors again, spending two years with Fitzroy's reserves.

=== SANFL ===
Williams moved to South Australia in 1980 where he joined West Adelaide and would be a regular fixture in their side for the rest of the decade. Under legendary coach Neil Kerley, Williams was a member of West's 1983 premiership side that defeated Sturt. He started the 1983 SANFL Grand Final in the Forward pocket and had stints in the ruck throughout the game. During the second quarter of the game at Football Park Williams dislocated the Ring finger on his left hand which was said to be "at right angles to where it should be". Despite this, Williams returned to the game in the 2nd half and helped The Bloods win their first (and so far only) premiership since 1961.

Williams is regarded as having his best game of club football in Round 21 of the 1982 season when West Adelaide defeated Sturt by 2 points at the Adelaide Oval. Playing Fullback on champion Sturt Full-forward/ruckman Rick Davies, it was expected that Davies would take his usual number of marks and kick a few goals. By the end of the match Davies had failed to take a mark opposed to Williams who played from in front of the "Jumbo Prince" and didn't give an inch in body contests. For his efforts Williams was judged best on ground.

Craig Williams retired following the 1989 SANFL season in which West Adelaide failed to make the finals. He played a total of 160 games for The Bloods and kicked 50 goals.

== Interstate Football ==
Williams represented South Australia in State of Origin and won the Fos Williams Medal for his performance at fullback against Western Australia at Subiaco Oval (Perth) in 1983. This performance also saw Williams selected as an All-Australian that year.
