= 1961 SANFL Grand Final =

West Adelaide	Norwood
16.13 (109)	11.7 (73)
	1	2	3	4
WA	3.2 (20)	9.5 (59)	12.8 (80)	16.13 (109)
NOR	4.5 (29)	7.6 (48)	9.7 (61)	11.7 (73)
- Date: Saturday, 30 September (2:10 pm)
- Stadium: Adelaide Oval
- Attendance: 40,909

The 1961 SANFL Grand Final was an Australian rules football game contested between the West Adelaide Football Club and the Norwood Football Club. West Adelaide won by 36 points.

This game was known as the "Turkish Bath Grand Final" due to the game being played in 35 °C heat.
