= Jack Broadstock =

Australian rules footballer (1920–1995)

Personal information
- Full name: John Harman Broadstock
- Born: 1 December 1920
- Died: 26 September 1995 (aged 74)
- Original team: West Adelaide (SANFL)
- Height: 183 cm (6 ft 0 in)
- Weight: 87 kg (192 lb)
- Position: Centre

Playing career^{1}
Years	Club	Games (Goals)
1938–42, 1947, 1950	West Adelaide (SANFL)	62 (37)
1943–46	Richmond (VFL)	33 (23)
1949, 1951	West Torrens (SANFL)	18 (15)

Coaching career
Years	Club	Games (W–L–D)
1950	West Adelaide	17 (9–8–0)
- ^{1} Playing statistics correct to the end of 1950.

Career highlights
- Richmond premiership player 1943; Boulder City premiership captain-coach 1948; West Adelaide captain-coach 1950; West Adelaide Football Club Hall of Fame member

John Harman Broadstock (1 December 1920 – 26 September 1995) was an Australian rules footballer who started his league career with West Adelaide Football Club in the South Australian National Football League (SANFL) in 1938 before moving to Melbourne to play for the Richmond Football Club in the Victorian Football League (VFL) in 1943 and winning a premiership with the club in his debut season. He served as a private in the Australian Army during the Second World War.

== Career ==
In just his sixth VFL game, Broadstock became a premiership player when he was the centreman in Richmond's winning 1943 VFL Grand Final team. He played finals football again the following season and kicked three goals in a Semi Final loss to Fitzroy, but was suspended for eight weeks for hacking.

Broadstock had started his career at West Adelaide in 1938 and returned there in 1947. He missed out on playing in their premiership side that year when he was suspended the week before for hacking at Port Adelaide ruckman Bob McLean.

He captain-coached Boulder City to a Goldfields National Football League premiership in 1948, having spent the first half of the season unavailable to play due to residential qualification requirements and a tribunal suspension that was imposed the previous season in Adelaide. Broadstock returned to West Torrens the following season and was a losing Grand Finalist. Back at West Adelaide in 1950, he was captain coach for the year before announcing his retirement.
