= Jack Sexton (footballer, born 1907) =

Australian rules footballer, born 1907

Personal information
- Full name: Jack Ettwell George Sexton
- Born: 27 February 1907; Adelaide, South Australia
- Died: 26 October 1935 (aged 28); Adelaide, South Australia
- Original team: Glenelg (SANFL)
- Height: 180 cm (5 ft 11 in)
- Weight: 73 kg (161 lb)
- Position: Centre

Playing career^{1}
Years	Club	Games (Goals)
1925–29	Glenelg (SANFL)	47 (?)
1930–31	West Adelaide (SANFL)	19 (2)
1932–34	Fitzroy (VFL)	29 (10)
1935	Norwood (SANFL)	6 (0)
- ^{1} Playing statistics correct to the end of 1935.

Career highlights
- SANFL debut with Glenelg in 1925; SANFL Magarey Medallist in 1931; VFL debut with Fitzroy on 30 April 1932 v Carlton at Brunswick Street Oval; Fitzroy Club Captain 1932-33; Norwood Captain-Coach 1935 (6 games)

Jack Ettwell George Sexton (27 February 1907– 26 October 1935) was an Australian rules footballer who played in the South Australian National Football League (SANFL) and for Fitzroy in the Victorian Football League (VFL).

== History ==
Sexton was a centreman and started his career in 1925 with Glenelg. In 1930, he crossed to West Adelaide after a dispute over his salary. He won a Magarey Medal in 1931 and in the following season, he moved to Victoria and joined Fitzroy. He captained Fitzroy in 1932 and 1933 and played a total of 29 VFL games before returning to South Australia in 1935. Now playing with Norwood as captain-coach, Sexton starting suffering from pleurisy and was forced to resign just six games into the season. He finished with a total of 101 senior games and in October that year, he died from his illness.
