= Ron Benton =

Australian rules footballer

Personal information
- Full name: Ronald Mark Benton
- Born: 1937 (age 88–89)

Playing career^{1}
Years	Club	Games (Goals)
1955–1965	West Adelaide (SANFL)	184 (198)
- ^{1} Playing statistics correct to the end of 1965.

Career highlights
- SANFL debut with West Adelaide on 14 May 1955; SANFL Magarey Medallist 1957; West Adelaide Best & Fairest 1957; West Adelaide Premiership Player 1961; West Adelaide Leading Goal Kicker 1963 (29); West Adelaide Football Club Life Member 1962; West Adelaide Football Club Hall of Fame Inaugural Inductee 2005

Ronald Mark Benton (born 1937) is a former Australian rules footballer who played with West Adelaide in the South Australian National Football League (SANFL).

Benton made his debut for West Adelaide in 1955 shortly before his 17th birthday. His first kick in league football saw him score the first of 198 goals for the club. He played 184 games for West Adelaide and in 1957 he won the SANFL's highest individual honor, the Magarey Medal, as well as winning West Adelaide's Best & Fairest award.

Ron Benton was also a member of West's 1961 premiership team playing on the half-forward flank as West Adelaide defeated Norwood for their first premiership win since 1947. The Grand Final was played on 30 September and, in what became known as the 'Turkish Bath Grand Final' due to it being played in 35°C heat, West prevailed over the Redlegs 16.13 (109) to 11.7 (73) in front of 40,909 at the Adelaide Oval with the oppressive heat blamed for the lowest Grand Final attendance since West defeated Norwood in 1947. Benton was one of West's best players on the day with 21 kicks, 2 handballs, 4 marks and he kicked 2 goals.

He was West Adelaide's leading goal kicker in 1963 with 29 goals.
