= James Ezard =

Australian rules footballer

Personal information
- Born: 24 March 1986 (age 40); Melbourne, Victoria
- Original team: Calder Cannons
- Debut: Round 8 2006, Port Adelaide vs. Brisbane Lions, at AAMI Stadium
- Height: 178 cm (5 ft 10 in)
- Weight: 75 kg (165 lb)

Playing career^{1}
Years	Club	Games (Goals)
2005–2015	West Adelaide (SANFL)	156 (unknown)
2005–2006	Port Adelaide (AFL)	4 (1)
- ^{1} Playing statistics correct to the end of 2006.

Career highlights
- SANFL Magarey Medallist 2009

James Thomas Ezard (born 24 March 1986) is a former Australian rules footballer, who played four games for Port Adelaide in the Australian Football League (AFL) and 156 league games for West Adelaide in the South Australian National Football League (SANFL). The nephew of Essendon premiership player Alan Ezard, he was taken at pick 34 in the 2004 AFL draft from Calder Cannons.

== AFL career ==
=== Port Adelaide career (2005–2006) ===
In 2005, Ezard kicked the winning goal against Adelaide in a pre-season NAB cup match, but never broke into the senior team in that year, spending the year playing in the SANFL with West Adelaide, putting in some good performances, but still unable to break into Port Adelaide's main team.

Ezard made his AFL debut in round 8 of the 2006 AFL season, but Port Adelaide were soundly beaten by Brisbane Lions by 69 points. Ezard played the next three games, kicking a goal in the match against Carlton. At the end of the season, he was delisted by the club, which saw seven players leaving. He wore the number 9 guernsey for Port Adelaide, for the 2005 and 2006 season.

== SANFL career ==
=== West Adelaide career (2005–2015) ===
After being picked by West Adelaide in the 2005 Mini-Draft, he made his SANFL debut with Wests on 26 March 2005. In 2006 after being delisted by Port Adelaide, Ezard signed with West Adelaide, deciding to stay in South Australia instead of returning home to Victoria so that he did not have to relocate.

2009 saw Ezard hit top form for West Adelaide who finished the season in sixth place (after finishing ninth/last each year between 2005 and 2008). His consistent form was rewarded when he was named joint winner of the SANFL's highest individual honor, the Magarey Medal, with Rhys Archard from North Adelaide.
