= Robert Day (footballer) =

Australian rules footballer

Personal information
- Born: 13 April 1944 (age 82)
- Debut: 25 April 1962, West Adelaide vs. Norwood, at Adelaide Oval
- Height: 178 cm (5 ft 10 in)
- Weight: 78 kg (172 lb)

Playing career^{1}
Years	Club	Games (Goals)
1962–70, 1973	West Adelaide	137 (50)
1971–72	Hawthorn	38 (12)
Total		175 (62)
- ^{1} Playing statistics correct to the end of 1973.

Career highlights
- West Adelaide Best & Fairest 1965, 1966, 1970; All-Australian 1966; West Adelaide Club Captain 1970; VFL debut with Hawthorn on 10 April 1971 v Fitzroy at Glenferrie Oval; Hawthorn premiership player 1971; 12 State games for South Australia; West Adelaide Football Club Player Life Member; West Adelaide Football Club Hall of Fame Inaugural Inductee 2005

Robert John Day (born 13 April 1944) is a former Australian rules footballer who played most of his career in the SANFL with West Adelaide before moving to Victoria to play with Hawthorn in the VFL.

Day was a centreman who started his career with West Adelaide in the SANFL in 1962, making his debut for the club in the Anzac Day "Grand Final Replay" against Norwood at the Adelaide Oval. In 1966, he was named in the All-Australian team and was a three-time Best & Fairest winner with West Adelaide (1965, 1966 and 1970) and captained the club in his final season (1970). He also represented South Australia 12 times at interstate football.

In 1971 he moved to Victoria and signed with Hawthorn in the VFL. He was a member of that season's premiership team, playing as a half back flanker in Hawthorn's Grand Final win over St Kilda. He was replaced at half time because he was suffering from concussion.

The final years of Day's career was interrupted by injury, and he retired having played just 175 games in South Australia and Victoria in 12 seasons.

As of 2013, Day is a board member of the West Adelaide Football Club.

== Family ==
Robert's elder brother Ian Day is a former West Adelaide and South Adelaide player and long-time SANFL television commentator and member of the West Adelaide Hall of Fame.

Robert's grandson Will Day was drafted by Hawthorn with the 13th pick in the 2019 AFL draft. In 2023, Will Day won the Peter Crimmins Medal as Hawthorn's best player for the season.
