= Mark Dreher =

Australian rules footballer

Personal information
- Full name: Andrew Mark Dreher
- Born: 27 March 1961 (age 65)
- Original team: Willaura
- Height: 183 cm (6 ft 0 in)
- Weight: 83 kg (183 lb)

Playing career^{1}
Years	Club	Games (Goals)
1979–1982	Collingwood	15 (0)
- ^{1} Playing statistics correct to the end of 1982.

Andrew Mark Dreher (born 27 March 1961) is a former Australian rules footballer who played with Collingwood in the Victorian Football League (VFL).

A Willaura recruit, Dreher played for Collingwood from 1979 to 1982.

Three of Dreher's his first four appearances with Collingwood came in the 1979 finals series. After debuting in round 20, Dreher played in a qualifying final, semi final and preliminary final. Collingwood won the preliminary final, over North Melbourne, but Dreher lost his place for the grand final to Stan Magro, who was returning from suspension.

Dreher played just two games in 1980, when he was troubled by a back injury.

During the 1981 VFL season Dreher was almost part of the trade that saw Warwick Irwin go from Fitzroy to Collingwood. Dreher and teammate Des Herbert, along with over $60,000, were to be given to Collingwood, but he was replaced in the deal by Leigh Carlson.

Against Carlton at Victoria Park in the third round of the 1982, Dreher broke a bone in his neck and although he played out the game he was out of the side with the injury until round 15. His last appearance for Collingwood was their round 20 loss to Melbourne, his seventh game of the season.

He went to West Adelaide in 1983 and was a centre half-back in their premiership team that year.
