= Robert Snell =

Australian rules footballer

Personal information
- Full name: Robert Snell
- Born: 15 February 1903; Collie, Western Australia
- Died: 4 April 1983 (aged 80); Adelaide, South Australia
- Original team: East Perth (WAFL)
- Position: Centre

Playing career^{1}
Years	Club	Games (Goals)
1923–24	East Perth (WAFL)	26 (2)
1927–30, 1932–33	West Adelaide (SANFL)	84 (16)
1931	New Town (TANFL)	? (?)
- ^{1} Playing statistics correct to the end of 1933.

Career highlights
- WAFL debut with East Perth in 1923; SANFL debut with West Adelaide on 14 May 1927; West Adelaide Premiership Player 1927; SANFL Magarey Medallist 1929; TANFL debut with New Town in 1931; 13 State games for South Australia 1927–29

Robert Snell (15 February 1903 – 4 April 1983) was an Australian rules footballer who played for East Perth in the West Australian Football League (WAFL), West Adelaide in the South Australian National Football League (SANFL) and New Town in the Tasmanian National Football League (TANFL) between 1923 and 1933.

== Career ==
Snell started his career in 1923 with East Perth and the following season finished second in the Sandover Medal. He sought a clearance to join West Adelaide for the 1925 season but after East Perth refused he had to wait until 1927, playing amateur and junior competitions in the meantime.

A centreman, Snell was a member of a West Adelaide premiership side in his debut SANFL season in 1927. In 1929 he won the Magarey Medal, being the last medallist known to the man who donated the award, William Ashley Magarey, as Magarey passed shortly after the 1929 SANFL season.

Snell then moved to Tasmania in 1931 to play for New Town in the TANFL. In the height of the Great Depression Snell could earn up to A£10 per game and the same in wages playing in the Apple Isle. He returned to West Adelaide in 1932 and stayed with the club until his retirement from playing in 1933 having played 84 games and kicking 16 goals for Wests.

Snell represented South Australia 13 times in Interstate football between 1927 and 1929.

== Post career ==
Having retired from football after 1933, his life post football was spent as a licensed bookmaker. Due to race meetings being held on Saturdays, Snell saw very little league football for many years. He retired from bookmaking in 1973 and spent his time playing lawn bowls twice a week at the Adelaide Bowling Club.

Bob Snell died in Adelaide in April 1983 having recently turned 80. West Adelaide won their 8th and so far last SANFL Premiership in the same year.
