= Bernie Conlen =

Australian rules footballer

Personal information
- Full name: Bernard Harold Conlen
- Born: 26 October 1960 (age 66)
- Original team: Oakleigh District
- Height: 163 cm (5 ft 4 in)
- Weight: 67 kg (148 lb)
- Position: Rover

Playing career^{1}
Years	Club	Games (Goals)
1981	South Melbourne (VFL)	2 (0)
1983–86	West Adelaide (SANFL)	38 (34)
Total		40 (34)
- ^{1} Playing statistics correct to the end of 1986.

Career highlights
- VFL Début: Round 21, 1981 South Melbourne vs Essendon at Lake Oval; SANFL début with West Adelaide on 2 April 1983; West Adelaide Premiership player 1983

Bernard Harold Conlen (born 26 October 1960) is a former Australian rules footballer who played with South Melbourne in the Victorian Football League (VFL), and West Adelaide in the South Australian National Football League (SANFL).

== Career ==
=== South Melbourne ===
Conlen, an Oakleigh District recruit, played for South Melbourne in the final two rounds of the 1981 VFL season. He debuted in South Melbourne's 111 point loss to Essendon at Windy Hill in round 21, having 18 disposals. The next week the club played their last ever game before relocation, against North Melbourne. Conlen had five disposals, in a 33 point loss.

He took part in the 1982 Escort Championships, which was won by the Swans, but didn't feature in the 1982 VFL season, only the reserves.

=== West Adelaide ===
In 1983 he was enticed to South Australia where he joined West Adelaide and was a rover in their premiership team that year. He also finished with the third most votes in the 1983 Magarey Medal count, behind Stephen Kernahan (ineligible) and winner Tony Antrobus.
