= Larry Watson (footballer) =

Australian rules footballer (born 1957)

Personal information
- Full name: Larry John Watson
- Born: 23 September 1957 (age 69); Dimboola, Victoria
- Original team: Dimboola
- Height: 179 cm (5 ft 10 in)
- Weight: 79 kg (174 lb)
- Position: Utility

Playing career^{1}
Years	Club	Games (Goals)
1975–78	Essendon (VFL)	31 (2)
1979–80	Fitzroy (VFL)	4 (0)
1981–84	West Adelaide (SANFL)	66 (19)
- ^{1} Playing statistics correct to the end of 1984.

Career highlights
- VFL debut: Round 17, 1975 Essendon vs Geelong at Kardinia Park; Essendon Most Improved Player 1976; SANFL debut with West Adelaide on 4 April 1981; West Adelaide Premiership Player 1983

Larry John Watson (born 23 September 1957) is a former Australian rules football player who played with Essendon and Fitzroy in the Victorian Football League (VFL) and West Adelaide in the South Australian National Football League (SANFL).

== Career ==
=== VFL ===
Originally from Dimboola in western Victoria, Watson made his senior VFL debut for Essendon late in the 1975 season. A utility, he finished third in Essendon's 1976 'best and fairest' count despite playing only 11 games that year.

In 1977 Watson was joined at Essendon by his younger brother Tim. The first time the brothers played together for the Bombers was in Round 13 of 1977 against South Melbourne at Windy Hill with the Bombers winning by 12 points. Their final game together before Larry moved to Fitzroy was in Round 22 in 1978 against Hawthorn at Princes Park. Unfortunately that day the Hawks defeated Essendon 17.16. (118) to 16.13. (109).

Watson left Essendon at the end of 1978 and joined Fitzroy for the 1979 and 1980 seasons where he played fours games for the Lions while not kicking a goal.

=== SANFL ===
After his brief stint at Fitzroy, Watson was signed by SANFL club West Adelaide in 1981. Under the coaching of legendary South Australian footballer Neil Kerley, he played 66 games and kicked 19 goals for the Bloods until the end of 1984, often playing as a half back flanker and was a member of their 1983 premiership team. Larry Watson was one of a number of ex-VFL players in The Bloods 1983 Premiership team, including Craig Williams (St Kilda), Bernie Conlen (Sydney), Mark Dreher (Collingwood), Mike Smith (Sth Melbourne) and captain Ian Borchard (Richmond). The team also included future VFL/AFL players Bruce Lindner (Geelong and Adelaide), Tony Burgess (Collingwood) and Grantley Fielke (Collingwood and Adelaide), while Mark Mickan (Brisbane Bears and Adelaide) was unlucky to miss the game through injury.

The Watson brothers played in Grand Finals in different Australian states in 1983. Larry in West Adelaide's 34-point win over Sturt at Football Park in front of 47,129 fans, and just one day earlier Tim in Essendon's 83-point loss to Hawthorn in the VFL Grand Final at the Melbourne Cricket Ground (MCG) in front of 110,332 fans.

== Personal life ==
In 2002, Watson's son Jake died at the age of 18 after an on-field collision in an Under-19s SANFL match for West Adelaide. Following Jake's passing the West Adelaide Football Club retired his number 13 jumper at the Under-19 level as a mark of respect.

Tim Watson's son Jobe Watson, Larry's nephew, played 220 games for Essendon in the AFL.
