= Darren Bartsch =

Personal information
- Full name: Darren Andrew Bartsch
- Born: 28 April 1969 (age 57)
- Original team: Loxton JFC (RFL)
- Draft: No. 52, 1988 national draft; No. 7, 1990 mid-season draft; No. 29, 1992 pre-season draft; No. 66, 1993 pre-season draft
- Height: 198 cm (6 ft 6 in)
- Weight: 89 kg (196 lb)
- Position: Ruckman

Playing career
Years	Club	Games (Goals)
1988–1993	West Adelaide	50 (28)
1994	Port Adelaide	10 (2)
Total		60 (30)

Darren Andrew Bartsch (born 28 April 1969) is a former Australian rules footballer who played as a ruckman for West Adelaide and Port Adelaide in the South Australian National Football League (SANFL). Bartsch, standing at 196 centimetres (6 ft 5 in) (Note: Bartsch's height has also been given as 198 cm (6 ft 6 in) and 200 cm (6 ft 7 in).) and weighing 89 kilograms (196 lb), was smaller than many others in his position, but his adaptiveness, powerful jump and speed – unusual for a player his size – helped compensate.

He is primarily known for being listed on five occasions by Australian Football League (VFL/AFL (Note: In 1990, the competition formerly known as the Victorian Football League (VFL) became the Australian Football League (AFL).)) clubs – West Coast, Geelong, Adelaide, Brisbane and Essendon – the most of any footballer who never played an AFL match.

== Early life ==
Bartsch grew up in Loxton, a town in South Australia's Riverland region, and attended Loxton High School. In his youth, he gave up football for basketball. However, when he was 16, the local under-18 team coaxed him into a return to the sport. Joining midway through Loxton's season with teammates including Tony Modra, Bartsch played the last six matches, including the grand final; the team ultimately went unbeaten through the year.

== Football career ==
=== 1986–89: Beginning of SANFL career, West Coast selection ===
Bartsch showed enough to be recruited by West Adelaide for the 1986 SANFL season. He moved to a house across from Richmond Oval, the club's home ground, where he lived with four other players, including Modra and Kieran Sporn. By the time of the 1988 VFL draft, held in November, he had played nine SANFL games.

Ahead of the draft, multiple clubs called Bartsch to inquire about whether he was open to playing for them, including West Coast. Bartsch told them he had just re-signed with West Adelaide and did not intend to leave. West Coast nevertheless selected Bartsch with pick 52 in the draft. (In those days, clubs were allowed to draft any player they desired. There was no requirement for players to nominate themselves for the draft). West Coast, using their sixth pick, could afford to be speculative, having already selected players among the best in Perth.

Bartsch's coach, Kevin Morris, advised him to decline the move to West Coast because he needed more time to develop. True to his word, Bartsch remained with his club in Adelaide. West Coast would eventually give up on their prospect and delist him, though Bartsch himself only found out through a newspaper. However, Bartsch continued to attract attention from VFL clubs.

=== 1990–92: Adelaide stint, Geelong and Brisbane selections ===
In 1990, Geelong was interested enough to arrange for Bartsch to fly out to Melbourne to play in a non-senior game against Hawthorn. Geelong would go on to select him in that year's mid-season draft with their first selection, pick 7.

Bartsch seriously contemplated moving across to Geelong, but was swayed by the news an Adelaide team would enter the AFL for the 1991 season. He reasoned holding out to join this new club instead would allow him to play AFL and stay in Adelaide at the same time. To help form their inaugural squad, Adelaide was allowed to recruit ten SANFL players listed by other AFL clubs. Bartsch was named among these ten. He attended the club's pre-season, including their first-ever training session, but stress fractures in his shins prevented him from playing early in the season. Bartsch returned with West Adelaide, playing in the 1991 SANFL Grand Final on the losing side, but did not regain form in time for the end of Adelaide's AFL season. (Note: Bartsch recalls coming close to playing an AFL match with Adelaide, having been named in a provisional Thursday squad for an upcoming game. However, he injured himself at training the night he was selected. It is not clear which game he refers to, nor which point in the season it took place.)

Ahead of the 1992 AFL season, Bartsch's stress fractures recurred. These, combined with his diminishing commitment to football, led Adelaide to delist him. Bartsch consulted a specialist about his injuries, who advised him to either have an operation or take a year off from football. He chose the latter option, since he had just bought a landscaping company and could not afford to miss time for surgery. Bartsch continued to garner attention from AFL clubs; this time, the Brisbane Bears were interested. Bartsch explained he intended neither to play football that year nor move to Brisbane, but the club nevertheless drafted him with pick 29 in the 1992 pre-season draft, their third selection. Following through on his decision, Bartsch did not play in 1992.

=== 1993: Essendon stint ===
Initially, Bartsch did not even intend to play in 1993, but a West Adelaide friend persuaded him to return to the club. Bartsch returned to training in February – at that point, he had been absent from football for 18 months. Meanwhile, Bartsch's former coach Morris had joined Essendon as a recruiter. He urged the club to select Bartsch in the upcoming pre-season draft, though he faced ridicule from some who did not believe Bartsch would ever leave Adelaide. Morris's push ultimately succeeded, with Essendon hoping his personal connection to Bartsch would be enough to persuade the player to make an interstate move. Two weeks after Bartsch returned to training, Morris called to inform him Essendon were intending to select him in the next day's preseason draft. Bartsch, initially incredulous, was persuaded to commit to the club for a year. Essendon would go on to use their sixth selection on Bartsch – pick 66 overall.

Bartsch's landscaping business remained a pressing concern for him; he did not want to have to leave Adelaide. The solution he and Essendon worked out was to fly across to Melbourne on Thursdays, stay at Morris's hotel, then return to Adelaide on Sundays. Before beginning this arrangement, Bartsch continued to play with West Adelaide until May. He regained form in Essendon's reserves side, playing "about 16" games according to his recollections. However, a month before the season's end, he injured a groin muscle. This injury, together with an AFL decision to reduce the number of players clubs could list, led Essendon to delist Bartsch. (Note: Bartsch recalls another contributing factor: he was knocked out after a reserves match at the Melbourne Cricket Ground, trying to calm a fight between two fans. According to Bartsch, the incident "knocked the shit" out of him and his football never recovered. It is unclear at which point in the season this match took place.) Morris personally delivered him the news.

=== 1994: Return to SANFL and retirement ===
Although Bartsch still hoped to play for an AFL club, he decided against nominating for the 1993 national draft in October. Instead, he opted to spend a year building fitness in the SANFL and seeking attention from AFL teams, particularly hoping to rejoin Essendon. Bartsch joined Port Adelaide, hoping the team would prove to be a pathway back to the national league – for Port Adelaide were looking to enter the AFL themselves. His recruitment was considered a "bonus" for the club, since another Port ruckman, Brett Chalmers, was set to leave for Adelaide in the AFL. Bartsch played ten games for Port Adelaide, but suffered back injuries and ultimately retired aged 25.

== Reflections ==
Richard Hinds, writing for The Age, called Bartsch "the perfect example of how the seemingly clinical drafting process can also be the province of hope, wishful thinking and whimsy". For Jon Anderson, writing for the Herald Sun, Bartsch exemplified how the AFL draft had been "a case of pick and hope" in its early stages. Shane O'Sullivan, Brisbane's general manager when the club drafted Bartsch, defended Brisbane's decision almost two years later, arguing teams could "get something" even from long-shot players, so long as the club was "prepared to work".

Reflecting on Bartsch's career, his long-time coach Morris wished he could have spent longer working with him. He cited two weaknesses in Bartsch as a player: he had not "matured early enough, size-wise" and he "needed to learn to play the game". However, Morris remained absolutely confident Bartsch could have played well in the AFL.

Bartsch himself admitted he had not always committed his full efforts to football. He felt he had not achieved what his talent suggested he could, which he put down to youthful blindness towards the abilities he possessed. Bartsch regretted his unorthodox travel arrangement while at Essendon, believing it cost him opportunities, and endorsed requiring players to nominate themselves for the draft before they could be selected.

== Post-football life ==
Following his retirement from football, Bartsch lost interest in the sport and moved to Darwin, Northern Territory, to "get away from it all". However, people continued to recognise him as "the bloke who had been drafted all those times". He continued to run his landscaping business and was subcontracted to mow median strips along two major Darwin roads – Stuart Highway and Bagot Road. By November 2004, Bartsch had moved to Gold Coast, Queensland, and was reported to still be living in Queensland as of 2011.

Bartsch married and, in 2003, had a son.

== Later life ==
After retiring from football, Bartsch established several businesses on the Gold Coast, Queensland. He later became a digital wealth educator and specialist, focusing on cryptocurrency and digital asset education for Australian investors, SMSF trustees, and financial professionals.

Bartsch is a specialist for Wealth99, an Australian digital asset platform operating under AFSL 546278, and founded Digital Wealth Specialist, a free digital asset education platform at digitalwealthspecialist.org.
