= Neil Kerley =

Australian rules footballer (1934–2022)

Neil Kerley AM

Personal information
- Full name: Donald Neil Kerley
- Nicknames: Knuckles, King, Kerley, Kerls
- Born: 20 February 1934; Barmera, South Australia
- Died: 29 June 2022 (aged 88); Walker Flat, South Australia
- Original teams: Barmera, Rostrevor College
- Height: 6 ft 0 in (183 cm)
- Weight: 14 st 1 lb (89 kg)
- Positions: Ruckman, utility

Playing career^{1}
Years	Club	Games (Goals)
1952–1963	West Adelaide	149 (87)
1964–1966	South Adelaide	57 (0)
1967–1969	Glenelg	59 (36)
Total		265 (123)

Representative team honours
Years	Team	Games (Goals)
	South Australia	32 (?)

International team honours
1968	Australia	

Coaching career
Years	Club	Games (W–L–D)
1961–62, 1981–84, 1992–93	West Adelaide	182 (97–84–1)
1964–1966	South Adelaide	66 (48–18–0)
1967–1976	Glenelg	223 (142–81–0)
1977–1980	West Torrens	89 (42–46–1)
1988–1990	Central District	68 (36–31–1)
Total		628 (365–260–3)
- ^{1} Playing statistics correct to the end of 1969.

Career highlights
- Club: 2x SANFL Premiership captain-coach: (1961, 1964); 4x West Adelaide best and fairest: (1958, 1959, 1961, 1962); Glenelg best and fairest: (1967); 2x SANFL premiership coach: 1973, 1983; Mail Medal winner: 1953; West Adelaide Hall of Fame (inaugural inductee) – legend status; Representative: All-Australian team: (1961 – vice-captain); 6x South Australia captain: 1959–1962, 1965–1966; Overall: Australian Football Hall of Fame; South Australian Football Hall of Fame

Donald Neil Kerley AM (20 February 1934 – 29 June 2022) was an Australian rules footballer and coach. He is best known for taking three clubs to four South Australian National Football League (SANFL) premierships over three decades as both a player and coach, and for playing 32 state games for South Australia.

== Playing career ==
Kerley, who started his senior footballing career with Barmera in the Riverland Football League in 1948 at the age of 14, played mostly in the SANFL between 1952 and 1969. A Norwood supporter as a young boy growing up on a fruit block in Barmera in South Australia's Riverland, Kerley left home less than a year later and headed north on his motorbike for two years, working as a Jackeroo on cattle stations.

Kerley attended Rostrevor College. He played alongside Norwood great Peter Vivian ('52) in Rostrevor's U13 football and cricket sides. Kerley returned to umpire several Past vs Present Player matches at Rostrevor in the 60s.

When he turned 18 in 1952 Kerley was called up for National Service where he was based at the Woodside Barracks in the Adelaide Hills. While there he was invited by a friend to attend a Norwood game. The Redlegs, as Norwood has been known since 1878, had heard of Kerley's football skills but Neil was not impressed with the reception he received from the club and when West Adelaide approached him a week later he agreed to play for the club.

Kerley played in an era when players usually only played one position on the ground yet he was a rare breed of player who could play any position on the ground including being successful in the ruck despite his lack of height for a ruckman (Kerley only stood at 6 feet 0 inches or 183 centimetres tall compared to most ruckmen of the time who stood at least 6 feet 3 inches or 191 centimetres tall). His strong, early leap and the ability to do so all game as well as his physical strength made him one of the league's top knock ruckmen. He made his SANFL league debut for West Adelaide in 1952 as a reserve for a game against West Torrens at Thebarton Oval (his only game of the season). West captain-coach Brian Faehse was injured early in the game and Kerley went on to play centre half-back, standing a young Lindsay Head, a future three time Magarey Medal winner (1955, '58 and '63). Kerley got what he believes was his first touch when he took a contested mark against Head but, in what would be a pattern in his career (not agreeing with officials), the umpire awarded the mark to Head.

In 1953 Kerley headed north again and worked as a truck driver at a tent camp near the rocket testing range at Koolymilka, close to Woomera. Although just 19 years old he was appointed Captain-Coach of the local scratch side. He won the association's Mail Medal and led the team to the premiership. In 1954 Kerley was persuaded by former West Adelaide player Bill Sutherland to take over from him as coach of North Whyalla in the Whyalla Football League. Kerley led North Whyalla to the premiership in both 1954 and 1955 and in 1955 he played his second SANFL league game with West Adelaide which allowed the club to retain him as a registered player.

In early 1956 Kerley was on his way to take up a position of playing coach at South Gambier in the South-East & Border Football League when West Adelaide intervened. West persuaded Kerley to start a serious league career in the SANFL and also found a replacement coach for South Gambier.

In his first full season with West Kerley helped the team to the Grand Final against Port Adelaide at the Adelaide Oval. It would be the first of four losing Grand Finals for Kerley as a West Adelaide player or coach (1956, 1958, 1959 and 1962) – all against the Fos Williams coached Port Adelaide. Ironically, Williams was a West Adelaide junior who, before moving to Port in 1950, had played 54 games and kicked 112 goals for the Bloods from 1946 to 1949 and participated in the club's Grand Final win over Norwood in 1947. Kerley's coach in 1956 was Laurie Cahill while from 1957 to 1960 the club was coached by the legendary Jack Oatey. Kerley won the first of four Best and Fairest awards for the club in 1958 and was appointed West captain in 1959.

Kerley took over as coach from Jack Oatey in 1961 when Oatey moved on to coach Sturt, whom he would coach until 1982 and take to seven premierships. He led Westies to its first premiership since 1947 with a 16.13 (109) to 11.7 (73) win over Norwood. In what became known as "The Turkish Bath Grand Final" due to being played in 96.1 °F (35.6 °C) heat. The oppressive heat helped the Bloods as they had won their Second Semi-Final clash with Port Adelaide and had earned a week's rest while Norwood had to defeat Port in the previous week's Preliminary Final to make the big game. The heat was also blamed for the crowd of just 40,909, the smallest since West Adelaide's last premiership in 1947. Kerley was at his dynamic best on the day leading the 1st Ruck. He collected 23 kicks, 3 handballs and took 6 marks in a best on ground performance.

1962 produced much the same for West Adelaide. Kerley won the club's Best and Fairest award in 1961 and 1962 to add to his 1958 and 1959 wins. He led the Bloods to the 1962 SANFL Grand Final where they faced their nemesis Port Adelaide but couldn't repeat their 1961 win. Following the season Kerley, who was always his own man and rarely bowed to officialdom, was sensationally sacked as West Adelaide's coach despite taking them to one premiership and two Grand Finals in his two seasons in charge. He was replaced for 1963 as captain-coach by longtime teammate Doug Thomas. Because Thomas was against Kerley's sacking and initially reluctant to take up the position, only doing so when assured by Kerley that he had his support, Kerley did agree to play out his contract with the club. Nevertheless, West Adelaide's form dropped in 1963 and they finished fourth, losing the First Semi-Final. As a player and playing-coach for West Adelaide, Kerley played 165 games and kicked 87 goals between 1952 and 1963 and led the club to its seventh premiership in 1961.

After his contract with West Adelaide ended following 1963, Kerley signed on as captain-coach of South Adelaide in 1964. Between 1945 and 1963 South Adelaide won just 62 matches in nineteen seasons and never finished above any rival except Glenelg or Sturt. Kerley cemented his place among the greats of South Australian football when he took the Panthers from bottom in 1963 to the SANFL Premiership in 1964 with a 27-point win over his long-time Grand Final nemesis Port Adelaide. As of 2026 this is the last time South Adelaide has won the SANFL premiership. Kerley went on to play 56 games for the Panthers until the end of 1966.

Kerley signed with his third league club when he agreed to join Glenelg as player-coach from 1967. He played 55 games for the Tigers, won the club's Best and Fairest award in 1967 and led the club to the 1969 Grand Final against Sturt.

Following the loss to Sturt (coached by Jack Oatey), Kerley retired from league football having played 265 SANFL games and kicking 123 goals in a career spanning 16 seasons beginning in 1952, and having played a total of 314 senior career games. Along with 32 games in interstate football for South Australia, Kerley also played 13 night series matches and four International Rules matches on the 1968 Australian Football World Tour.

== Coaching career ==
Following his retirement from playing at the end of 1969, Kerley moved full-time into coaching from 1970, continuing on with Glenelg. He took the Tigers to the 1970 Grand Final where again they lost to Sturt who won their fifth premiership in a row under the coaching of Kerley's former West Adelaide mentor Jack Oatey.

The Tigers finished sixth and missed the finals in both 1971 and 1972 but bounced back with a vengeance in 1973, finishing the 21-game minor round with a club best ever 20–1 record, their only loss to reigning premier (and 1972 Champions of Australia) North Adelaide in Round 8 at the Roosters’ home ground, Prospect Oval. Kerley coached the club to just its second premiership (and first since 1934) when they defeated North Adelaide by seven points in front of 56,525 fans in what would be the last Grand Final played at the Adelaide Oval, as the league's new headquarters, Football Park in the western Adelaide suburb of West Lakes opened in 1974.

Kerley coached Glenelg to both the 1974 and 1975 SANFL Grand Finals where they lost both times to Sturt in '74 and Norwood in '75. His last season as coach of Glenelg in 1976 saw them finish in third place. Despite four separate stints at West Adelaide, Kerley said he felt more at home at Glenelg citing the lack of fighting with the club's board, his success there as a player and coach as well as the general atmosphere at the club as reasons.

Kerley signed on as coach of perennial under-performers West Torrens in 1977 and fans of the club were called upon to "Join the King’s Eagle Revival in 1977" with T-shirts printed up stating just that. He took them from bottom (tenth) with losses in each of the last sixteen matches in 1976 to sixth in 1977 and fifth in 1978. The club slumped to eighth in 1979 before Kerley again lifted them and took the Eagles to their last ever finals series by finishing fifth in 1980.

In 1981 Kerley was enticed back to West Adelaide by their President Bob Lee and his 1961 premiership winning teammate, General Manager Doug Thomas, who had replaced Kerley as Captain-Coach of the Bloods in 1963. Kerley and Thomas had remained friends as Kerley's beef from 1962 was with the then board of the club and not Thomas who only agreed to the coaching role in a bid to bring stability to the club. His impact at Richmond was immediate, steering the Bloods to fifth place and their first finals series since 1977. With strong recruiting of former VFL players such as Ian Borchard, Larry Watson, Craig Williams, Mike Smith, Mark Dreher and Bernie Conlen, as well as young stars Roger Luders, Bruce Lindner, Mark Mickan and Grantley Fielke mixing with veterans Geoff Morris and Peter Meuret, and a game plan that turned attacking from defence into an art form, Kerley had begun to steer West back up the SANFL ladder after being "easy beats" since his departure from the club in 1963. They finished sixth in 1982, only needing to beat Norwood (the eventual 1982 premiers) in the final round at Norwood Oval to be assured of fifth spot. However, a fully focused Norwood took The Bloods apart with an 80-point win. The Bloods continued to improve and in 1983 Kerley won his fourth premiership as a coach when West Adelaide defeated Sturt in the Grand Final at Football Park, with Kerley stating that the 1983 team was the best side he had ever coached. This was West Adelaide's last premiership until 2015.

West Adelaide could not repeat their stunning 1983 form due to injuries and finished the 1984 season in sixth place. Following the 1984 season Kerley, seeking a new challenge after more than 30 years of league football, accepted the position of Fitness Director and Tender Captain for South Australia's America's Cup campaign.

Following SA's unsuccessful America's Cup challenge, Kerley was ready to come back to football and after negotiations with WAFL club Claremont, Woodville and Central District he became the seventh coach of Centrals in 1988, leading them to fourth in both 1988 and 1989 before ending his three-year term at Elizabeth by finishing seventh in 1990.

In 1991 Kerley was appointed Football Manager for the newly formed Adelaide Crows in the Australian Football League (AFL) and spent the 1991 AFL season with the Crows before making his third run as coach of West Adelaide in 1992, taking over from Kevin Morris who like Kerley in 1962 was sacked after taking Wests to the Grand Final in 1991. Unfortunately West Adelaide couldn't recapture their previous season's form due to injuries and the loss of key players to the Crows. The Bloods finished sixth in 1992 and only avoided the wooden spoon by percentage in 1993. Kerley was sacked for the second time as coach of West Adelaide, bringing an end to his SANFL coaching career after 28 seasons that began with a premiership at West Adelaide in 1961.

Neil Kerley is the only SANFL coach to win premierships at multiple clubs over three decades.

== Representative football ==
Neil Kerley represented South Australia 32 times during his league career including captaining SA to a famous win over Victoria at the Melbourne Cricket Ground in 1963. Kerley also gained All Australian selection in 1961. He also spent 10 years as state coach over a span of 30 years with his last year being 1984 when South Australia lost to Victoria by just 4 points at Football Park and to Western Australia by a single point at Footy Park.

Kerley was also coach of the Australian team for the 1987 International rules series played in Ireland. The Aussies defeated the Irish 3 games to 2.

== Post-football ==
Following his last season as a senior coach in 1993, Kerley was a boundary rider for Channel 7 telecasts of the AFL during the 1990s, until they lost the rights in 2001. He also served as a selector for the AFL's All-Australian team.

== Recording history ==
Kerley recorded a single of "I was Born Under a Wandering Star" whilst still coaching Glenelg in the early 1970s. It received considerable air play on Australian radio.

== Personal life ==
Neil Kerley was the son of Laurie and Lillian (née O'Brien) Kerley and was the second of the couple's six children (brothers Michael, Ronald, James and Brian, and sister Jennifer). His father died at the Daw Park Repatriation General Hospital in Adelaide on 21 February 1945, the day after Neil's 11th birthday. Laurie had fought in the AIF in World War I and also in Egypt and Crete in World War II. His mother, after struggling for years as a single mother, finally moved to Adelaide later in life and died in 1992.

While coaching North Whyalla in 1955, Neil Kerley met a local girl Barbara Gordon. The pair were married on 25 February 1955 at the St Teresa's Catholic Church in Whyalla and have three children (Donald Jr, Robyn and Gail). In a story told by Kerley in the book Knuckles by Jim Rosevear (2003), at one of his first training sessions in charge of Central District during 1988, Kerley told his players during a break that sitting in the grandstand watching them was a woman who knew as much about the game of football as he did and that he would be informed on his way home (a 45 km drive from Elizabeth to the couple's home in Bellevue Heights) who had trained well and who hadn't. Kerley was referring to wife Barbara who had learned a thing or two about Aussie rules football in her 30+ years sitting on the sidelines watching her husband's teams play. Over the years Barbara was often able to inform Neil of things that happened during training or games that he had missed, something he greatly valued during his coaching career.

Kerley died on 29 June 2022, aged 88, after crashing his car in Walker Flat, South Australia.

== Awards ==
- Four time winner of the West Adelaide Football Club Best & Fairest Award. (A club record, shared with Mark Mickan).
- SANFL Life Member 1984
- Member of the Australian Football Hall of Fame 1997
- Inaugural Inductee into the South Australian Football Hall of Fame 2002
- Member of the Order of Australia
- Inaugural Inductee into the West Adelaide Football Club Hall of Fame 2005
- Official Legend of the West Adelaide Football Club 2005
- In 2015 the West Adelaide Football Club changed the name of the club's Best & Fairest award to the Neil Kerley Medal.

== Bibliography ==
- Agars, Merv (1987). Bloods Sweat & Tears. West Adelaide Football Club. pp. 18–168. ISBN 0-85904-029-1.
- Rosevear, Jim (2003). Knuckles the Neil Kerley Story. Jim Rosevear. ISBN 0-9580504-3-0.
- Collins, Ben; Eddy, Dan (2016). "Neil Kerley". Champions : conversations with great players & coaches of Australian football (3rd ed.). Richmond, Victoria: The Slattery Media Group. ISBN 9780992379162.
