= Australian Champions League =

Annual Australian football tournament

The Australian Champions League, formerly the SA Champions League, is an annual Australian rules football tournament, held in March, between invited teams from metropolitan and country leagues. Invitations are targeted at the premiership teams from each competition.

== Competition Winners ==
Year	Champion	Runner-up	Number of teams
2016	Reynella	Paskeville	6
2017	Waikerie	Barossa District	7
2018	Rostrevor Old Collegians	Waikerie	6

== 2018 Australian Champions League ==
The 2018 edition of the Australian Champions League was held on 24 March 2018 at Denise Norton Park (Pardipardinyilla), Adelaide. It was won by the Rostrevor Old Collegians Football Club.

=== Competing Teams ===
Club	League	How qualified	Position
Barossa District	BLGFA	2017 Premiers - BLGFA	Group Stage
Kadina	YPFL	2017 Premiers - YPFL	Group Stage
Lucindale	KNTFL	2017 Premiers - KNTFL	Group Stage
Old Ignatians	AdelaideFL	Wild Card (7th Adel. Footy League Div. 2)	Group Stage
Rostrevor Old Collegians	AdelaideFL	2017 Premiers - Adel. Footy League Div. 1	Champions
Waikerie	RFL	2017 Premiers - RFL/2017 Champions - SA Champions League	Runners-Up

=== Results ===
Game	Result
Game 1	Rostrevor Old Collegians v Barossa District
Game 2	Waikerie v Kadina
Game 3	Barossa District v Old Ignatians
Game 4	Kadina v Lucindale
Game 5	Rostrevor Old Collegians v Old Ignatians
Game 6	Waikerie v Lucindale
Final	Rostrevor Old Collegians d Waikerie

== 2017 Australian Champions League ==
The re-branded 2017 edition of the Australian Champions League was held on 25 March 2017 at Thebarton Oval. It was won by the Waikerie Football Club.

=== Competing Teams ===
Club	League	How qualified	Position
Barossa District	BLGFA	2016 Premiers - BLGFA	Runners-Up
Hahndorf	HFL	2016 Premiers - HFL Division 1	Group Stage
Moonta	YPFL	2016 Premiers - YPFL	Group Stage
Prince Alfred Old Collegians	AdelaideFL	2016 Premiers - C9AFL Division 1	Group Stage
Reynella	SFL	2016 Champions - SA Champions League	Group Stage
Riverton-Saddleworth-Marrabel United (RSMU)	NEFL	2016 Premiers - NEFL	Group Stage
Waikerie	RFL	2016 Premiers - RFL	Champions

=== Results ===
Pool	Result
Pool A	Prince Alfred Old Collegians 4.9 (33) d Reynella 4.3 (27)
Pool B	Barossa District 4.4 (28) d Hahndorf 3.2 (20)
Pool A	Waikerie 5.8 (38) d RSMU 0.0 (0)
Pool B	Prince Alfred Old Collegians 6.4 (40) d Moonta 3.5 (23)
Pool A	Barossa District 7.6 (48) d Reynella 0.1 (1)
Pool B	Hahndorf 5.2 (32) d RSMU 2.5 (17)
Pool A	Waikerie 4.2 (26) d Moonta 3.6 (24)
Final	Waikerie 6.4 (40) d Barossa District 0.2 (2)

== 2016 SA Champions League ==
The inaugural SA Champions League was held on 12 March 2016 at Thebarton Oval, South Australia. The competition was won by the Reynella Football Club.

=== Competing Teams ===
Club	League	How qualified	Position
Hahndorf	HFL	2015 Premiers - HFL Division 1	Group Stage
Nuriootpa Rover	BLGFA	2015 Premiers - BLGFA	Group Stage
Padthaway	KNTFL	2015 Premiers - KNTFL	Group Stage
Paskeville	YPFL	2015 Premiers - YPFL	Runners-Up
Reynella	SFL	2015 Premiers - SFL	Champions
St Peter's Old Collegians	C9AFL	Representative - C9AFL (Note: C9AFL Division 1 Premiers Goodwood Saints, and Runners-Up Payneham Norwood Union declined the invitation)	Group Stage

=== Results ===
Pool	Result
Pool A	St Peter's Old Collegians 4.4 (28) d Nuriootpa Rover 1.2 (8)
Pool B	Reynella 4.4 (28) d Hahndorf 33.6 (24)
Pool A	Paskeville 5.2 (32) d St Peter's Old Collegians 2.5 (17)
Pool B	Padthaway 3.8 (26) d Hahndorf 2.2 (14)
Pool A	Nuriootpa Rover 5.3 (33) d Paskeville 3.7 (25)
Pool B	Reynella 4.11 (35) d Padthaway 0.3 (3)
Final	Reynella 9.4 (58) d Paskeville 4.3 (27)
