= Kevin Morris (Australian footballer) =

Australian rules footballer (born 1950)

Personal information
- Full name: Kevin Morris
- Born: 20 August 1950 (age 76)
- Original team: Salesian College / Waverley (VFA)
- Height: 180 cm (5 ft 11 in)
- Weight: 84 kg (185 lb)

Playing career^{1}
Years	Club	Games (Goals)
1969-1970	Waverley	26 (72)
1971–1976	Richmond (VFL)	110 (71)
1977–1981	Collingwood (VFL)	71 (53)
1982	Werribee	15 (18)
Total		222 (214)

Representative team honours
Years	Team	Games (Goals)
	Victoria	2 (?)

Coaching career
Years	Club	Games (W–L–D)
1988–91	West Adelaide (SANFL)	93 (40–52–1)
- ^{1} Playing statistics correct to the end of 1991.

Career highlights
- VFL debut for Richmond on 14 June 1971 v Geelong at Kardinia Park; Richmond Premiership Player 1973, 1974; Richmond Best & Fairest 1975; Essendon Reserves Premiership Captain-Coach 1983

Kevin Morris (born 20 August 1950) is a former Australian rules football player who played in the Victorian Football League (VFL) between 1971 and 1976 for the Richmond Football Club and then from 1977 until 1981 for the Collingwood Football Club.

He commenced his coaching career as Captain/Coach of Victorian Football Association (VFA) club Werribee in 1982 then went back to the VFL as Captain/Coach of the Essendon reserve side from 1983 to 1985, winning the premiership in his first season.

After retiring from playing, Morris was appointed coach of West Adelaide in the South Australian National Football League (SANFL) in 1988 and remained in Adelaide until 1991. In his four years with The Bloods Morris took them to 8th in '88, 7th in '89 and 6th in '90 before leading the club to the 1991 SANFL Grand Final where they lost to North Adelaide 21.22 (146) to 11.7 (73) in the most spiteful SANFL Grand Final in the modern era with at least 4 all-in brawls marring what was a class effort by The Roosters over a West Adelaide team that had won 12 of its previous 14 games. In Morris's West Adelaide team in 1991 were then Adelaide Crows AFL players Mark Mickan, Bruce Lindner, Paul Patterson and Shaun Rehn (who missed the final series through injury) as well as future AFL star Full-forward Tony Modra along with former VFL players Darren Carlson, Peter Banfield, Matthew Simpson and Michael Kennedy.

In the weeks after The Bloods Grand Final loss, Morris was controversially sacked as Bloods coach and in 1992 he returned to Essendon, firstly in recruiting then as an assistant-coach. He coached the Richmond Reserves side in 1995 then was an assistant-coach in 1996. Most recently he worked as an assistant-coach at St Kilda.

Kevin Morris's son Steven is currently Richmond's VFL coach, He was traded to the Tigers as a player after being pre-listed by the new Greater Western Sydney Football Club prior to the 2011 AFL Draft from West Adelaide where he won the clubs Best & Fairest in 2011.
