= List of Brisbane Bears captains =

This is a list of all captains of the Brisbane Bears, an Australian rules football club in the Australian Football League.

Dates	Captain(s)	Notes
1987–1989	Mark Mickan	
1990–1996	Roger Merrett	
