= Tony Modra =

Australian rules footballer (born 1969)

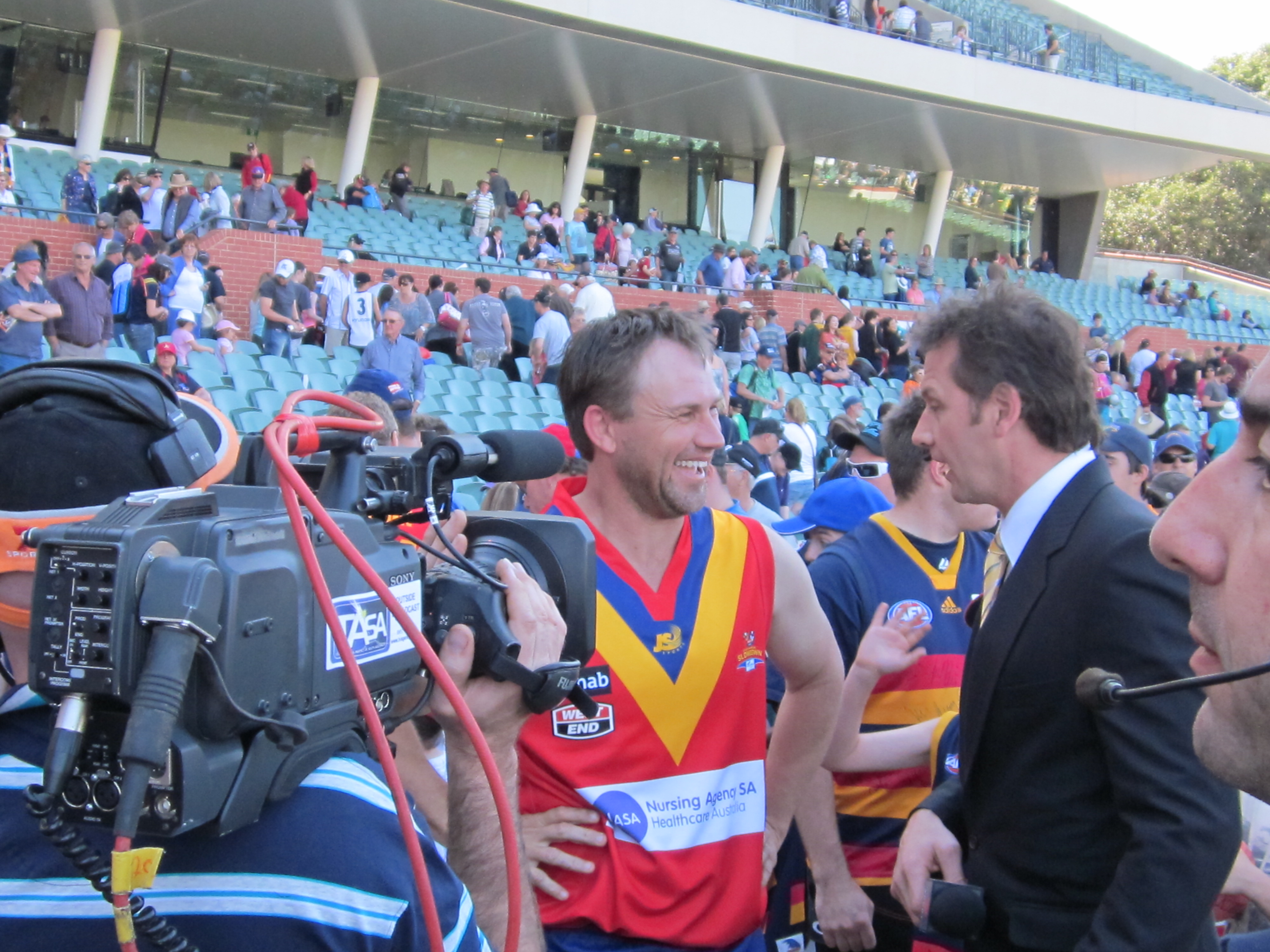
- Modra being interviewed in October 2011

Personal information
- Full name: Anthony Dale Modra
- Nicknames: Mods, Godra
- Born: 1 March 1969 (age 57); McLaren Vale, South Australia
- Original team: West Adelaide (SANFL)
- Height: 188 cm (6 ft 2 in)
- Weight: 95 kg (14 st 13 lb)
- Position: Full-forward

Playing career^{1}
Years	Club	Games (Goals)
1991–1995	West Adelaide	34 (112)
1992–1998	Adelaide	118 (440)
1999–2001	Fremantle	47 (148)
Total		199 (700)

Representative team honours
Years	Team	Games (Goals)
1992–1997	South Australia	6 (24)
- ^{1} Playing statistics correct to the end of 2001.

Career highlights
- Club: 2× All-Australian team: 1993, 1997; Coleman Medal: 1997; 5× Adelaide Leading Goal Kicker: 1993-1997; Fremantle Leading Goal Kicker: 1999; Fremantle 25 since ‘95 Team; 3× AFL Mark of the Year 1993, 1997, 2000; AFL Goal of the Year: 1995; West Adelaide leading Goal Kicker: 1992; Adelaide Team of the Decade – Full-Forward; South Australian Football Hall of Fame; Adelaide Football Club Life Member: 2008; Representative: Australian National Football Carnival Championship: 1993

Anthony Dale Modra (born 1 March 1969) is a former Australian rules footballer who represented Adelaide and Fremantle in the Australian Football League (AFL) and West Adelaide in the South Australian National Football League (SANFL). Known for his spectacular marking ability in the full-forward position, Modra had the physical strength and size to match the best opposition full-backs in the competition. As of 2023, he is the only Adelaide player to kick more than 100 goals in a season, achieving the feat in 1993 by registering 129 goals for the year.

== Early life ==
Modra was born in McLaren Vale, South Australia, but grew up nearby in Christies Beach, South Australia, and attended Christies Beach Primary School along with future Adelaide teammate Nigel Smart. He moved to Loxton, South Australia, at age 11 with his parents (Douglas and Valerie) and four older siblings (Kerry, Kym, Rick and Joanne). Modra grew up playing multiple sports—notably Australian rules football and soccer for Loxton, both of which he loved equally—but solely played Australian rules football from age 14, which most of his friends played. Growing up, Modra supported Glenelg in the SANFL, plus St Kilda and Richmond in the then-VFL.

== Early career ==
Modra first played Under-19s football for West Adelaide in 1988 but could not adjust to working and playing football in Adelaide. Modra returned home, and in 1989, as a 20-year-old, Tony kicked 76 goals for the Loxton Football Club; Loxton would end up losing the Grand Final to Barmera-Monash.

In 1990, Tony joined his brothers Rick and Kym at the Renmark Rovers Football Club in pursuit of a premiership. Modra led the team to win the 1990 Riverland Football League in a grand final replay after drawing with Waikerie the previous week. Modra kicked a remarkable 118 goals for the season.

In 1991, Modra attempted to move to Red Cliffs in the Sunraysia Football League and played one pre-season game for the club, kicking 13 goals on newly Sydney-drafted Darren Holmes. However, Modra was still contracted to West Adelaide, and they would not be awarded a fee if Modra was to play in the AFL one day. Due to Red Cliffs being based interstate, this fee would not be received if Modra played there. Lawyers from Red Cliffs faced a tribunal in Adelaide, but the tribunal ruled that Modra was a contracted West Adelaide player. Reluctantly, he returned to West Adelaide for the 1991 season, playing in the losing 1991 SANFL Grand Final. He did enough to earn an invite to an Adelaide Crows training session, and he managed to win selection in the squad. Modra was selected in the 1991 AFL draft as a Zone Selection for the Adelaide Football Club. Modra played 15 SANFL games for West Adelaide and kicked 46 goals between 1988 and 1991.

== AFL career ==
=== Adelaide (1992–1998) ===
Modra began his AFL career at 23 years of age. At first, his potential at full-forward was overshadowed by senior player Scott Hodges, who had a reputation as a prolific goalkicker in the SANFL with Port Adelaide, having broken the record for most goals in a season in 1990 when he kicked 153. Modra played 8 games in his debut season of 1992, kicking 21 goals.

At the start of 1993, an injury to Hodges led to Modra's inclusion at full-forward with Adelaide. Modra was an instant success, kicking 10 goals in the opening round against Richmond at Melbourne Cricket Ground and finishing the year as runner-up to Geelong's Gary Ablett Sr. in the Coleman Medal with 119 goals in the home-and-away season, kicking an additional 10 in 3 finals.

Both the Crows and Modra had less successful seasons in 1994 through to 1996. Although Modra topped the club goalkicking each year, he was relegated to playing for West Adelaide for three games in 1995, but missed one for disciplinary reasons and was not eligible for that season's SANFL finals. Also in 1994, Modra garnered controversy when he insulted a female flight attendant while on a flight from Hong Kong. Modra apologised for the incident, citing his 'nightlife' as the cause, and was given fines by both the Adelaide Crows and the AFL.

In 1997, Modra won the Coleman Medal for the most goals in the season, and he was also selected in the All-Australian team. However, a torn anterior cruciate ligament injury sustained during a marking contest in the preliminary final caused Modra to miss the Crows' first premiership win when they defeated St Kilda in the 1997 AFL Grand Final.

After returning from the knee injury 10 months later in 1998, he failed to regain form and was not considered for the 1998 AFL Grand Final. He was thus one of only a few leading Crows players who did not receive a premiership medallion in either of the Crows premiership years of 1997 and 1998.

Modra's aerial ability was unsurpassed in his prime, and he was nominated for Mark of the Year on numerous occasions, winning the award in 1993, 1997 and 2000.

=== Fremantle (1999–2001) ===
Adelaide traded Modra to Fremantle for the 1999 AFL season. After kicking a club record 71 goals in his first year at Fremantle, (Note: only bested by since Matthew Pavlich in 2007 by a single goal) by the middle of the 2001 AFL season sore knees forced him to retire from the AFL at 32 years of age. His AFL career finished at 165 games for 588 goals.

== Statistics ==
Statistics are correct to end of 2001 season

Legend
G	Goals	K	Kicks	D	Disposals	T	Tackles
B	Behinds	H	Handballs	M	Marks

Led the league for the season only
Led the league after finals only
Led the league after season and finals

Season	Team	No.	Games	Totals							Averages (per game)						
Season	Team	No.	Games	G	B	K	H	D	M	T	G	B	K	H	D	M	T
1992	Adelaide	6	8	21	11	41	7	48	24	1	2.6	1.4	5.1	0.9	6.0	3.0	0.1
1993	Adelaide	6	23	129	61	240	41	281	163	8	5.6	2.7	10.4	1.8	12.2	7.1	0.3
1994	Adelaide	6	19	70	39	146	31	177	85	3	3.7	2.1	7.7	1.6	9.3	4.5	0.2
1995	Adelaide	6	16	42	29	108	25	133	54	4	2.6	1.8	6.8	1.6	8.3	3.4	0.3
1996	Adelaide	6	19	75	32	144	13	157	87	12	3.9	1.7	7.6	0.7	8.3	4.6	0.6
1997	Adelaide	6	25	84	45	181	22	203	93	13	3.4	1.8	7.2	0.9	8.1	3.7	0.5
1998	Adelaide	6	8	19	8	46	13	59	26	3	2.4	1.0	5.8	1.6	7.4	3.3	0.4
1999	Fremantle	6	20	71	43	166	17	183	81	7	3.6	2.2	8.3	0.9	9.2	4.1	0.4
2000	Fremantle	6	16	50	25	109	19	128	62	3	3.1	1.6	6.8	1.2	8.0	3.9	0.2
2001	Fremantle	6	11	27	15	61	18	79	35	8	2.5	1.4	5.5	1.6	7.2	3.2	0.7
Career			165	588	308	1242	206	1448	710	62	3.6	1.9	7.5	1.2	8.8	4.3	0.4

== Honours ==
AFL awards

- Coleman Medal: 1997
- All-Australian Team: 1993, 1997
- AFL Mark of the Year: 1993, 1994, 1995
- AFL Goal of the Year: 1993

Club awards

- Adelaide Football Club leading goalkicker: 1993, 1994, 1995, 1996, 1997, 1998
- Fremantle Football Club leading goalkicker: 1999
- Fos Williams Medal: 1993

Honours

- Adelaide Football Club Hall of Fame (2019)
- SANFL Hall of Fame
- Adelaide Football Club Team of the Decade (1991–2000)
- Encounter Bay Football Club Team of the Century (2021)

Named in honour

- Tony Modra Medal (SANFL Country competition's leading goalkicker)

== Post-AFL career ==
Since 2003, Modra has worked as a cattle farmer on his property at Waitpinga, near Victor Harbor, with his wife Erica and their two children, Hayley May and Luke.

He resumed playing local football for Encounter Bay in the Great Southern Football League. He later played for the Keith Football Club in the Kowree Naracoorte Tatiara Football League.

In 2006, Modra kicked 10 goals against Lucindale in a 119-point win. In 2007, he kicked eight goals in Keith's grand final victory over Penola, securing his first senior premiership since age 21.

In May 2011, it was reported that Modra was considering a return to the AFL as a coach with Adelaide.

On 3 October 2011, Modra played in the State of Origin Slowdown charity match at Adelaide Oval for the Little Heroes Foundation, alongside former AFL and SANFL players such as Andrew and Darren Jarman, Gavin Wanganeen, Mark Ricciuto, Ben Hart, Mick Martyn, Brendan Fevola, Matthew Lloyd and Dermott Brereton. South Australia won the match by one point following a late goal by Darren Jarman.

He has continued to participate in charity matches such as the West End Slowdown, including taking a notable mark in 2015 at the age of 46.

Since 2015, Modra has hosted Adelaide Football Club game day functions, including locker room events.

He has also made occasional media appearances, including appearances on programs such as The Front Bar and Footy Classified during Gather Round—the AFL’s annual "festival of footy" held in South Australia—in 2023 and 2026.

Modra has also been involved in community and corporate roles, including work with the Little Heroes Foundation and the Fleurieu Milk Company.

On 18 June 2026, Modra was seriously injured when a tree branch hit the truck he was driving near Victor Harbor. He was hospitalised at Flinders Medical Centre in Adelaide for emergency surgery pertaining to injuries on his cheek, jaw and eye socket. It was announced on 7 July 2026 that he had been released from the hospital and was continuing his recovery at home.
