= Berri Football Club =

Australian football club

Names
- Full name: Berri Football Club
- Nickname(s): Demons

Club details
- Founded: 1909
- Colours: Navy Blue Red
- Competition: Riverland Football League
- President: De-Anne Johns
- Coach: Clint Ridgeway
- Captain(s): Evan Penaluna
- Ground(s): Berri Oval

Other information
- Official website: www.berrifootballclub.com

Berri Football Club (commonly known as The Demons) is an Australian rules football club playing in the Riverland Football League (RFL) in South Australia. The club has an illustrious history winning many premierships, most recently the A-Grade in 2010.

== The Club ==
The Berri Football Club headquarters is also the RFL headquarters. The current coach is Clint Ridgeway and the captain is Evan Penaluna. As of 2025 the president of the club is De-Anne Johns, the first female president.

In 2002, the club won the RFL premiership, coming from eight goals down in the second quarter to secure the greatest comeback in an RFL grand final. The club was captained by Sam Ingerson in that year. In 2010 they defeated arch rivals Barmera-Monash to win premiership after finishing on top of the table.

== Rivalry ==
The club shares a rivalry with Barmera/Monash and competes once a year in the Fisher Cup, named after Bob Fisher, who played with both clubs.

== Premierships ==
- 1913, 1919, 1920, 1921, 1923, 1925, 1929, 1930, 1931, 1933, 1935, 1938, 1939, 1952, 1954, 1966, 1967, 1968, 1972, 1973, 1975, 1980, 1992, 2002, 2010

== VFL/AFL Players ==
- Tom Waye - Footscray
- Rhys Stanley - St Kilda, Geelong
- Jack Wade - South Melbourne
- Kaiden Brand - Hawthorn, Sydney

Malcom Hill Fitzroy

== Books ==
- The encyclopedia of South Australian Country Football Clubs. Peter Lines ISBN 9780980447293
