= Tony Burgess =

Tony Burgess may refer to:

- Tony Burgess (author) (born 1959), Canadian author
- Tony Burgess (footballer) (born 1961), Australian rules footballer

== See also ==
- Anthony Burgess (1917–1993), English writer and composer
