= Renmark =

Renmark may refer to:

- Renmark, South Australia, a town and locality in South Australia
- Renmark Airport, an airport in South Australia
- Renmark Pioneer, a former newspaper in South Australia which now trades as the Murray Pioneer
- Town of Renmark, a former local government area in South Australia which was merged to create the Renmark Paringa Council

== See also ==
- Renmark Rovers Football Club
