= Greg Anderson (footballer) =

Australian rules footballer (born 1966)

Personal information
- Born: 14 May 1966 (age 60); Adelaide, South Australia
- Draft: No. 18, 1982 interstate draft
- Height: 188 cm (6 ft 2 in)
- Weight: 92 kg (203 lb)
- Position: Wingman

Playing career^{1}
Years	Club	Games (Goals)
1983–87, 1995–96	Port Adelaide (SANFL)	121 (72)
1988–1992	Essendon	103 (60)
1993–1996	Adelaide	59 (19)
Total		283 (151)

Representative team honours
Years	Team	Games (Goals)
1984–1994	South Australia	12 (?)

International team honours
1986	Australia	3 (?)

Coaching career
Years	Club	Games (W–L–D)
2000–2003	South Adelaide	80 (26–52–2)
- ^{1} Playing statistics correct to the end of 1996.

Career highlights
- 2x SANFL Premiership player: (1995, 1996); Magarey Medal: (1986); 2x All-Australian team: (1987, 1993); Fos Williams Medal: (1993); Adelaide Team of the Decade - Wing; South Australian Football Hall of Fame, inducted 2019; Australian Sports Medal: 2000

Gregory Anderson (born 14 May 1966) is a former Australian rules footballer who played for the Port Adelaide Football Club in the South Australian National Football League (SANFL) and the Essendon Football Club and Adelaide Football Club in the Australian Football League (AFL).

Easily recognizable on the field due to his powerful build, blonde mullet and penetrating left-foot kicking style, Anderson was one of the finest wingmen of his era, as evidenced by his numerous personal honours and induction into the South Australian Football Hall of Fame in 2019.

== Playing career ==
Born in Adelaide, South Australia to father Wally and one of four siblings, Anderson was educated at St Michael's College and made his senior SANFL debut as a 17-year-old for Port Adelaide against Sturt in Round 5 of the 1983 season at Football Park and quickly established a reputation as one of the finest wingmen in the SANFL. Anderson played in Port's loss to Norwood in the 1984 SANFL Grand Final and won the 1986 Magarey Medal.

After winning All-Australian selection in 1987, Anderson finally decided to try his luck in the Victorian Football League (VFL) after being approached by Essendon. He had actually been approached and drafted by South Melbourne back in 1981, but had shown no interest in going to Victoria at that stage.

Anderson made his VFL debut in Round 1 of the 1988 VFL season against North Melbourne at Windy Hill, gathering 12 disposals and kicking a goal in the Bombers' 82-point win.
The VFL became the AFL in 1990 and Anderson enjoyed his finest season in the League, playing in his 2nd losing Grand Final in 1990 when Essendon went down to Collingwood at the Melbourne Cricket Ground. Anderson continued with the Bombers until the end of the 1992 season following which he returned home to Adelaide to play with the Adelaide Crows.

Anderson made his Crows debut against Richmond in Round 1 of the 1993 AFL season, picking up 21 kicks and 3 handballs in the Crows 94 point win at the Melbourne Cricket Ground (MCG). He would on to play 59 games for the club until his retirement from football after the 1996 AFL season. Anderson won the Fos Williams Medal for his best on ground performance against Western Australia in the AFL State of Origin game at Football Park in 1993. For his performance against the Sandgropers he was rewarded with his 2nd All-Australian selection. Anderson was also a vital member of the Crows team that made the AFL Finals in just their 3rd season in 1993. The club finished 3rd after losing the Preliminary final against Anderson's former team Essendon who went on to win the Grand Final a week later against Carlton.

After his stellar 1993 season, Anderson's form started to drop off and starting in 1995 he was dropped on occasion back to Port Adelaide in the SANFL. He played enough games with Port during both the 1995 and 1996 seasons to be able to qualify for their finals campaigns under SANFL rules regarding AFL player eligibility. In both 1995 and 1996 he finally played in winning premierships when he was a member of the Port Adelaide teams that defeated Central District in both years.

Anderson retired from league football following Port Adelaide's win in the 1996 SANFL Grand Final. He had played 121 games with the Magpies over seven seasons (1983–87, 1995–96), 103 games for Essendon from 1988 to 1992 and 59 games for Adelaide from 1993 to 1996.

== Coaching career ==
In 2000 Anderson became coach of the South Adelaide Football Club in the SANFL. In his four seasons at the helm of the Panthers he was unable to lift the team into the finals, finishing 6th (2000), 7th (2001), 8th (2002) and 7th again in 2003. He was replaced as coach of South Adelaide for the 2004 SANFL season.

== Post-retirement ==
Anderson has been a regular player in the annual West End Slowdown charity match for the Little Heroes Foundation since its inception in 2000 playing for the "Adelaide Crows". "Port Adelaide" and "South Australia" (teams are composed mainly of retired players along with various celebrities). His most recent appearance was on 3 October 2011 for South Australia in the 2nd "State of Origin Slowdown" held at the Adelaide Oval.

In 2000 he was named on the wing in the Adelaide Crows Team of the Decade 1991-2000. He currently lives in Adelaide with his wife and four children.

On 24 October 2000, Anderson was awarded the Australian Sports Medal for his achievements in the sport.
