= Riverland Football League =

- Sport: Australian rules football
- Founded: 1909
- No. of teams: 6

The Riverland Football League is an Australian rules football league located in South Australia's Riverland region.

== History ==
The origins of this league was in 1909 when Lyrup, Renmark Town and Fairview Rovers founded the Murray Football Association.

The competition reformed in 1919 as the Upper Murray Football Association and later in 1952 became the Upper Murray Football League, the same name as the Upper Murray Football League based around Corryong, Victoria.

The league changed its name in 1972 to the Riverland Football League, The league used to have two divisions – the first division is for the main towns of the Riverland and the second division, called the Riverland Independent Football League, is for the minor towns The league's second division became known as the Riverland Independent Football League. For the 2023 season the Riverland Independent Football League formally separated from Riverland Football League control, to form a new league called the Murray Valley Football and Netball League.

=== Season 1956 ===
Heavy rains further up river in NSW and Victoria caused the Murray River to flood and it caused the abandonment of the 1956 football season.

=== Season 2020 ===
Due to COVID-19, The RFL made the decision that "A" and "B" grade competitions would not go ahead. However, junior competitions still ran for the 2020 football season (U13's, U15's and U18's)

== Clubs ==
=== Locations ===
Locations of the Riverland FL clubs

=== Current ===
Club	Jumper	Nickname	Home Ground	Former League	Est.	Years in RFL	RFL Senior Premierships	
Club	Jumper	Nickname	Home Ground	Former League	Est.	Years in RFL	Total	Years
Barmera-Monash		Roos	Memorial Oval, Barmera	–	1957	1957–	9	1983, 1984, 1985, 1986, 1987, 1989, 2012, 2023, 2025
Berri		Demons	Berri Oval, Berri	–	1910	1910–	25	1913, 1919, 1920, 1921, 1923, 1925, 1929, 1930, 1931, 1933, 1935, 1938, 1939, 1952, 1954, 1966, 1967, 1968, 1972, 1973, 1975, 1980, 1992, 2002, 2010
Loxton		Tigers	Loxton Oval, Loxton	LBWFA	1908	1946–	21	1946, 1947, 1948, 1949, 1951, 1953, 1955, 1957, 1958, 1960, 1961, 1962, 1963, 1964, 1965, 1970, 1971, 1976, 1988, 1996, 2006
Loxton North		Panthers	Loxton North Recreation Grounds, Loxton North	–	1954	1954–	10	1979, 1997, 1998, 1999, 2000, 2004, 2011, 2013, 2015
Renmark Rovers		Rovers	Renmark Oval, Renmark	–	1923	1923–	18	1924, 1926, 1927, 1928, 1932, 1950, 1959, 1969, 1977, 1978, 1981, 1982, 1990, 1995, 2009, 2019, 2021, 2022, 2024
Waikerie		Magpies	Waikerie Oval, Waikerie	MMFA	1908	1929–	16	1934, 1936, 1974, 1991, 1993, 1994, 2001, 2003, 2005, 2007, 2008, 2014, 2016, 2017, 2018, 2026

=== Former ===
Club	Jumper	Nickname	Home Ground	Former League	Est.	Years in RFL	RFL Senior Premierships		Fate
Club	Jumper	Nickname	Home Ground	Former League	Est.	Years in RFL	Total	Years	Fate
Barmera	(1921-30s)(1930s-56)		Memorial Oval, Barmera	AFA	1908	1921-1946, 1949-1956	2	1922, 1932	Merged with Cobdogla in 1947, de-merged after 1948 season. Merged with Monash in 1957 to form Barmera-Monash
Browns Well		Bombers	Paruna Oval, Paruna	–	1969	1969-1970	0	-	Moved to Riverland Independent FL in 1971
Centrals (1)				–	1919	1919	0	-	Folded after 1919 season
Centrals (2)			Winkie Oval, Winkie	–	1929	1929-1936	0	-	Folded after 1936 season
Chaffey		Blues		–	1922	1922-1923, 1948-1970	0	-	Moved to Riverland Independent FL in 1971
Cobdogla		Eagles	Cobdogla Oval, Cobdogla	–	1919	1919, 1924-1939, 1946, 1949-1970	0	-	Moved to Albert FA in 1920. Merged with Kingston to form Cobdogla Kingston in 1940. Merged with Barmera to form Cobdogla Barmera in 1947. Moved to Riverland Independent FL in 1971
Cobdogla Barmera		Eagles	Cobdogla Oval, Cobdogla	–	1947	1947-1948	0	-	De-merged into Cobdogla and Barmera in 1949
Cobdogla Kingston				–	1940	1940	0	-	De-merged into Cobdogla and Kingston following WWII
Fairview Rovers			Renmark Oval, Renmark	–	1908	1909-1922	1	1910	Merged with Renmark to form Renmark Rovers in 1923
Gerard		Hawks	Gerard Oval, Gerard	–	1948	1948-1970	0	-	Moved to Riverland Independent FL in 1971
Glossop		Magpies	Glossop Oval, Glossop	–	1920	1920, 1926-1928	0	-	Merged with Winkie to form Centrals (2) following 1929 season
Kingston				MMFA	1877	1913-1915, 1924, 1926-1939, 1946-1963	0	-	Merged with Moorook to form Moorook-Kingston in 1964
Lock 5			Renmark Oval, Renmark	–	1924	1924-1926	0	-	Folded after 1926 season
Loveday			Loveday Oval, Loveday	AFA	1921	1938	0	-	Folded after 1938 season
Lyrup		Saints	Lyrup Sporting Complex, Lyrup	–	1909	1909-1940, 1945-1970	2	1909, 1911	Moved to Riverland Independent FL in 1971
Monash			Monash Oval, Monash	–	1948	1948-1956	0	-	Merged with Barmera in 1957 to form Barmera-Monash
Moorook		Beetles	Moorook Oval, Moorook	AFA, LDFA, BFFA	1920	1924, 1926-1935, 1937-1940, 1946-1963	0	-	Moved to Loxton District FA in 1925 and 1936. Merged with Kingston to form Moorook-Kingston in 1964
Moorook-Kingston		Beetles	Moorook Oval, Moorook	–	1964	1964-1970	0	-	Moved to Riverland Independent FL in 1971
Paringa		Swans	Paringa Oval, Paringa	–	1961	1961-1970	0	-	Moved to Riverland Independent FL in 1971
Ral Ral			Renmark Oval, Renmark	–	1921	1921	0	-	Folded after 1921 season
Renmark	Dark with light band		Renmark Oval, Renmark	–	1909	1909-1922	1	1912	Merged with Fairview Rovers to form Renmark in 1923
Renmark Centrals				–	1920	1920-1934	0	-	Folded after 1934 season
Renmark Town			Renmark Oval, Renmark	–	1927	1927, 1929	0	-	Folded after 1929 season
Winkie			Winkie Oval, Winkie	–	1925	1925	0	-	Entered recess after 1925 season, merged with Glossop to form Centrals (2) following 1928 season
Winkie Rovers			Winkie Oval, Winkie	–	1947	1947-1951	0	-	Folded after 1951 season

== VFL/AFL players ==
- Grantley Fielke – Adelaide
- Luke Jericho – Adelaide
- Bruce Lindner – Adelaide, Geelong
- Mark Mickan – Brisbane Bears, Adelaide
- Tony Modra – Adelaide, Fremantle
- Mark Ricciuto – Adelaide
- Troy Lehmann – Brisbane Bears, Collingwood
- Alby Yeo – Essendon
- Tom Waye – Footscray
- Byron Schammer – Fremantle
- Kaiden Brand – Hawthorn
- Peter Yeo – Melbourne
- Russell Ebert – North Melbourne
- Michael Murphy – North Melbourne, Brisbane Bears, Adelaide
- Damien Murray – North Melbourne
- Bradley Helbig – Richmond
- Bruce Tschirpig – Richmond
- Ron Battams – St Kilda
- Rhys Stanley – St Kilda, Geelong
- Wayne Thornborrow – St Kilda
- Elkin Reilly – Sydney
- Jack Wade – Sydney

== Premierships ==
- 1909 Lyrup
- 1910 Fairview Rovers
- 1911 Lyrup
- 1912 Renmark
- 1913 Berri
- 1914 Renmark or Fairview Rovers
- 1915 Renmark or Fairview Rovers
- 1916-18 No competition due to World War I
- 1919 Berri
- 1920 Berri
- 1921 Berri
- 1922 Barmera
- 1923 Berri
- 1924 Renmark
- 1925 Berri
- 1926 Renmark
- 1927 Renmark
- 1928 Renmark
- 1929 Berri
- 1930 Berri
- 1931 Berri
- 1932 Renmark
- 1933 Berri
- 1934 Waikerie
- 1935 Berri
- 1936 Waikerie
- 1937 Barmera
- 1938 Berri
- 1939 Berri
- 1940-45 No competition due to World War II
- 1946 Loxton
- 1947 Loxton
- 1948 Loxton
- 1949 Loxton
- 1950 Renmark
- 1951 Loxton
- 1952 Berri
- 1953 Loxton
- 1954 Berri
- 1955 Loxton
- 1956 No competition due to floods
- 1957 Loxton
- 1958 Loxton
- 1959 Renmark
- 1960 Loxton
- 1961 Loxton
- 1962 Loxton
- 1963 Loxton
- 1964 Loxton
- 1965 Loxton
- 1966 Berri
- 1967 Berri
- 1968 Berri
- 1969 Renmark
- 1970 Loxton
- 1971 Loxton
- 1972 Berri
- 1973 Berri
- 1974 Waikerie
- 1975 Berri
- 1976 Loxton
- 1977 Renmark
- 1978 Renmark
- 1979 Loxton North
- 1980 Berri
- 1981 Renmark
- 1982 Renmark
- 1983 Barmera-Monash
- 1984 Barmera-Monash
- 1985 Barmera-Monash
- 1986 Barmera-Monash
- 1987 Barmera-Monash
- 1988 Loxton
- 1989 Barmera-Monash
- 1990 Renmark
- 1991 Waikerie
- 1992 Berri
- 1993 Waikerie
- 1994 Waikerie
- 1995 Renmark
- 1996 Loxton
- 1997 Loxton North
- 1998 Loxton North
- 1999 Loxton North
- 2000 Loxton North
- 2001 Waikerie
- 2002 Berri
- 2003 Waikerie
- 2004 Loxton North
- 2005 Waikerie
- 2006 Loxton
- 2007 Waikerie
- 2008 Waikerie
- 2009 Renmark
- 2010 Berri
- 2011 Loxton North
- 2012 Barmera-Monash
- 2013 Loxton North
- 2014 Waikerie
- 2015 Loxton North
- 2016 Waikerie
- 2017 Waikerie
- 2018 Waikerie
- 2019 Renmark
- 2020 No competition due to COVID-19 pandemic
- 2021 Renmark
- 2022 Renmark
- 2023 Barmera-Monash
- 2024 Renmark
- 2025 Barmera-Monash
- 2026 Waikerie

=== B Grade (prior to split in 1971) ===
- 1923 Berri
- 1924 Renmark
- 1925 Berri
- 1926 Kingston
- 1927 Barmera
- 1928 Lyrup
- 1929 Cobdogla
- 1930 Cobdogla
- 1931 Renmark Centrals
- 1932 Moorook
- 1933 Renmark Centrals
- 1934 Lyrup
- 1935 Berri
- 1936 Cobdogla
- 1937 Cobdogla
- 1938 Berri
- 1939 Lyrup
- 1940-45 No competition due to World War II
- 1946 Renmark
- 1947 Moorook
- 1948 Cobdogla
- 1949 Chaffey
- 1950 Cobdogla
- 1951 Chaffey
- 1952 Chaffey
- 1953 Loxton
- 1954 Loxton
- 1955 Cobdogla
- 1956 No competition due to floods
- 1957 Loxton
- 1958 Cobdogla
- 1959 Renmark
- 1960 Renmark
- 1961 Renmark
- 1962 Chaffey
- 1963 Renmark
- 1964 Barmera-Monash
- 1965 Loxton
- 1966 Renmark
- 1967 Loxton
- 1968 Berri
- 1969 Browns Well
- 1970 Berri

== 2000 Ladder ==
Riverland	Wins	Byes	Losses	Draws	For	Against	%	Pts	Final	Team	G	B	Pts	Team	G	B	Pts
Waikerie	13	0	3	0	1447	1078	57.31%	26	1st Semi	Barmera-Monash	14	7	91	Renmark	6	14	50
Loxton North	12	0	4	0	1522	1031	59.62%	24	2nd Semi	Waikerie	13	10	88	Loxton North	11	7	73
Barmera-Monash	9	0	7	0	1554	1186	56.72%	18	Preliminary	Loxton North	15	12	102	Barmera-Monash	10	11	71
Renmark	7	0	9	0	1302	1103	54.14%	14	Grand	Loxton North	16	3	99	Waikerie	7	5	47
Loxton	7	0	9	0	1291	1589	44.83%	14									
Berri	0	0	16	0	821	1950	29.63%	0									

== 2001 Ladder ==
Riverland	Wins	Byes	Losses	Draws	For	Against	%	Pts	Final	Team	G	B	Pts	Team	G	B	Pts
Barmera-Monash	11	0	4	1	1542	1201	56.22%	23	1st Semi	Berri	15	5	95	Loxton North	4	8	32
Waikerie	10	0	6	0	1401	1168	54.53%	20	2nd Semi	Waikerie	15	6	96	Barmera-Monash	13	6	84
Berri	10	0	6	0	1646	1388	54.25%	20	Preliminary	Barmera-Monash	13	12	90	Berri	7	6	48
Loxton North	9	0	6	1	1588	1180	57.37%	19	Grand	Waikerie	13	14	92	Barmera-Monash	8	12	60
Loxton	6	0	10	0	1305	1539	45.89%	12									
Renmark	1	0	15	0	756	1762	30.02%	2									

== 2002 Ladder ==
Riverland	Wins	Byes	Losses	Draws	For	Against	%	Pts	Final	Team	G	B	Pts	Team	G	B	Pts
Waikerie	12	0	4	0	1718	1113	60.69%	24	1st Semi	Loxton	18	15	123	Barmera-Monash	14	10	94
Berri	10	0	6	0	1539	1167	56.87%	20	2nd Semi	Berri	17	9	111	Waikerie	15	7	97
Loxton	10	0	6	0	1405	1367	50.69%	20	Preliminary	Waikerie	15	14	104	Loxton	13	13	91
Barmera-Monash	7	0	9	0	1043	1379	43.06%	14	Grand	Berri	19	13	127	Waikerie	16	9	105
Renmark	5	0	11	0	991	1440	40.77%	10									
Loxton North	4	0	12	0	1132	1362	45.39%	8									

== 2003 Ladder ==
Riverland	Wins	Byes	Losses	Draws	For	Against	%	Pts	Final	Team	G	B	Pts	Team	G	B	Pts
Waikerie	14	0	2	0	1701	1005	62.86%	28	1st Semi	Loxton North	9	15	69	Renmark	10	8	68
Loxton	10	0	6	0	1663	1308	55.97%	20	2nd Semi	Waikerie	15	14	104	Loxton	8	11	59
Loxton North	10	0	6	0	1389	1143	54.86%	20	Preliminary	Loxton	15	6	96	Loxton North	9	13	67
Renmark	8	0	8	0	1331	1116	54.39%	16	Grand	Waikerie	12	9	81	Loxton	7	13	55
Berri	4	0	12	0	1059	1685	38.59%	8									
Barmera-Monash	2	0	14	0	841	1727	32.75%	4									

== 2004 Ladder ==
Riverland	Wins	Byes	Losses	Draws	For	Against	%	Pts	Final	Team	G	B	Pts	Team	G	B	Pts
Waikerie	14	0	1	1	1917	959	66.66%	29	1st Semi	Loxton North	22	12	144	Berri	6	0	36
Loxton	12	0	4	0	1724	1335	56.36%	24	2nd Semi	Loxton	17	14	116	Waikerie	10	17	77
Loxton North	10	0	6	0	1562	1190	56.76%	20	Preliminary	Loxton North	16	16	112	Waikerie	6	8	44
Berri	6	0	10	0	1338	1568	46.04%	12	Grand	Loxton North	13	11	89	Loxton	7	10	52
Barmera-Monash	4	0	12	0	1022	1591	39.11%	8									
Renmark	1	0	14	1	911	1831	33.22%	3									

== 2005 Ladder ==
Riverland	Wins	Byes	Losses	Draws	For	Against	%	Pts	Final	Team	G	B	Pts	Team	G	B	Pts
Loxton	13	0	3	0	1720	1384	55.41%	26	1st Semi	Renmark	18	19	127	Berri	12	5	77
Waikerie	11	0	5	0	1674	1449	53.60%	22	2nd Semi	Waikerie	16	12	108	Loxton	12	16	88
Renmark	9	0	7	0	1388	1187	53.90%	18	Preliminary	Loxton	10	10	70	Renmark	7	5	47
Berri	7	0	9	0	1220	1479	45.20%	14	Grand	Waikerie	13	13	91	Loxton	12	12	84
Barmera-Monash	4	0	12	0	1303	1503	46.44%	8									
Loxton North	4	0	12	0	1320	1623	44.85%	8									

== 2006 Ladder ==
Riverland	Wins	Byes	Losses	Draws	For	Against	%	Pts	Final	Team	G	B	Pts	Team	G	B	Pts
Loxton	13	0	3	0	1844	1267	59.27%	26	1st Semi	Loxton North	13	25	103	Barmera-Monash	4	7	31
Waikerie	12	0	4	0	2003	1170	63.13%	24	2nd Semi	Loxton	22	15	147	Waikerie	11	10	76
Barmera-Monash	9	0	7	0	1392	1569	47.01%	18	Preliminary	Loxton North	13	13	91	Waikerie	10	17	77
Loxton North	8	0	8	0	1520	1276	54.36%	16	Grand	Loxton	17	9	111	Loxton North	13	8	86
Renmark	4	0	12	0	1164	1875	38.30%	8									
Berri	2	0	14	0	1078	1844	36.89%	4									

== 2007 Ladder ==
Riverland	Wins	Byes	Losses	Draws	For	Against	%	Pts	Final	Team	G	B	Pts	Team	G	B	Pts
Waikerie	12	0	4	0	1642	1215	57.47%	24	1st Semi	Berri	21	11	137	Renmark	12	8	80
Loxton	11	0	5	0	2057	1296	61.35%	22	2nd Semi	Waikerie	17	10	112	Loxton	15	9	99
Berri	10	0	6	0	1450	1446	50.07%	20	Preliminary	Loxton	18	20	128	Berri	11	16	82
Renmark	8	0	8	0	1443	1373	51.24%	16	Grand	Waikerie	16	13	109	Loxton	10	8	68
Barmera-Monash	6	0	10	0	1120	1443	43.70%	12									
Loxton North	1	0	15	0	940	1879	33.35%	2									

== 2008 Ladder ==
Riverland	Wins	Byes	Losses	Draws	For	Against	%	Pts	Final	Team	G	B	Pts	Team	G	B	Pts
Waikerie	13	0	3	0	1801	1043	63.33%	26	1st Semi	Barmera-Monash	10	12	72	Loxton North	9	6	60
Renmark	13	0	3	0	1743	1185	59.53%	26	2nd Semi	Waikerie	19	7	121	Renmark	9	12	66
Barmera-Monash	9	0	7	0	1267	1378	47.90%	18	Preliminary	Renmark	10	9	69	Barmera-Monash	9	10	64
Loxton North	6	0	10	0	1086	1573	40.84%	12	Grand	Waikerie	12	9	81	Renmark	11	11	77
Loxton	4	0	12	0	1240	1538	44.64%	8									
Berri	3	0	13	0	1216	1636	42.64%	6									

== 2009 Ladder ==
Riverland	Wins	Byes	Losses	Draws	For	Against	%	Pts	Final	Team	G	B	Pts	Team	G	B	Pts
Loxton	11	0	5	0	1759	1261	58.25%	22	1st Semi	Renmark	14	9	93	Barmera-Monash	8	14	62
Waikerie	11	0	5	0	1657	1399	54.22%	22	2nd Semi	Loxton	13	7	85	Waikerie	10	11	71
Renmark	10	0	6	0	1804	1360	57.02%	20	Preliminary	Renmark	15	17	107	Waikerie	9	8	62
Barmera-Monash	10	0	6	0	1418	1322	51.75%	20	Grand	Renmark	18	15	123	Loxton	5	10	40
Berri	4	0	12	0	1470	1616	47.63%	8									
Loxton North	2	0	14	0	985	2135	31.57%	4									

== 2010 Ladder ==
Riverland	Wins	Byes	Losses	Draws	For	Against	%	Pts	Final	Team	G	B	Pts	Team	G	B	Pts
Berri	13	0	3	0	1748	1023	63.08%	26	1st Semi	Loxton	18	16	124	Waikerie	16	8	104
Barmera-Monash	11	0	5	0	1695	1144	59.70%	22	2nd Semi	Berri	15	13	103	Barmera-Monash	9	7	61
Loxton	11	0	5	0	1682	1234	57.68%	22	Preliminary	Barmera-Monash	7	9	51	Loxton	4	12	36
Waikerie	8	0	8	0	1643	1438	53.33%	16	Grand	Berri	19	9	123	Barmera-Monash	12	11	83
Loxton North	4	0	12	0	989	1480	40.06%	8									
Renmark	1	0	15	0	910	2348	27.93%	2									

== 2011 Ladder ==
Riverland	Wins	Byes	Losses	Draws	For	Against	%	Pts	Final	Team	G	B	Pts	Team	G	B	Pts
Barmera-Monash	11	0	5	0	1651	1570	51.26%	22	1st Semi	Waikerie	15	9	99	Berri	10	9	69
Loxton North	11	0	5	0	1503	1245	54.69%	22	2nd Semi	Loxton North	20	11	131	Barmera-Monash	12	12	84
Waikerie	8	0	8	0	1453	1297	52.84%	16	Preliminary	Waikerie	8	15	63	Barmera-Monash	5	12	42
Berri	7	0	9	0	1321	1417	48.25%	14	Grand	Loxton North	13	7	85	Waikerie	5	13	43
Loxton	6	0	10	0	1385	1631	45.92%	12									
Renmark	5	0	11	0	1392	1545	47.40%	10									

== 2012 Ladder ==
Riverland	Wins	Byes	Losses	Draws	For	Against	%	Pts	Final	Team	G	B	Pts	Team	G	B	Pts
Barmera-Monash	15	0	1	0	1759	1122	61.06%	30	1st Semi	Loxton North	14	20	104	Berri	13	9	87
Waikerie	11	0	5	0	1498	1151	56.55%	22	2nd Semi	Barmera-Monash	14	15	99	Waikerie	13	12	90
Berri	10	0	5	1	1484	1242	54.44%	21	Preliminary	Waikerie	10	12	72	Loxton North	5	9	39
Loxton North	5	0	11	0	1332	1499	47.05%	10	Grand	Barmera-Monash	14	17	101	Waikerie	14	8	92
Renmark	4	0	11	1	1123	1381	44.85%	9									
Loxton	2	0	14	0	1005	1806	35.75%	4									

== 2013 Ladder ==
Riverland	Wins	Byes	Losses	Draws	For	Against	%	Pts	Final	Team	G	B	Pts	Team	G	B	Pts
Barmera-Monash	12	0	3	1	1766	1071	62.25%	25	1st Semi	Loxton	14	6	90	Waikerie	12	13	85
Loxton North	10	0	5	1	1487	1212	55.09%	21	2nd Semi	Barmera-Monash	19	13	127	Loxton North	13	13	91
Waikerie	10	0	6	0	1445	1275	53.13%	20	Preliminary	Loxton North	14	11	95	Loxton	8	10	58
Loxton	8	0	8	0	1407	1360	50.85%	16	Grand	Loxton North	15	7	97	Barmera-Monash	11	14	80
Renmark	5	0	11	0	1118	1613	40.94%	10									
Berri	2	0	14	0	943	1781	34.62%	4									

== 2014 Ladder ==
Riverland	Wins	Byes	Losses	Draws	For	Against	%	Pts	Final	Team	G	B	Pts	Team	G	B	Pts
Loxton North	12	0	4	0	1358	978	58.13%	24	1st Semi	Waikerie	16	10	106	Renmark	5	12	42
Barmera-Monash	10	0	6	0	1456	1125	56.41%	20	2nd Semi	Barmera-Monash	20	11	131	Loxton North	14	5	89
Waikerie	10	0	6	0	1342	1084	55.32%	20	Preliminary	Waikerie	12	18	90	Loxton North	8	12	60
Renmark	10	0	6	0	1437	1181	54.89%	20	Grand	Waikerie	15	14	104	Barmera-Monash	10	10	70
Berri	4	0	12	0	912	1509	37.67%	8									
Loxton	2	0	14	0	1098	1726	38.88%	4									

== 2015 Ladder ==
Riverland	Wins	Byes	Losses	Draws	For	Against	%	Pts	Final	Team	G	B	Pts	Team	G	B	Pts
Loxton North	11	0	5	0	1386	1214	53.31%	22	1st Semi	Waikerie	16	13	109	Loxton	15	14	104
Berri	10	0	6	0	1181	932	55.89%	20	2nd Semi	Loxton North	12	7	79	Berri	10	13	73
Loxton	9	0	7	0	1316	1051	55.60%	18	Preliminary	Waikerie	10	6	66	Berri	6	9	45
Waikerie	9	0	7	0	1266	1081	53.94%	18	Grand	Loxton North	16	11	107	Waikerie	6	4	40
Barmera-Monash	6	0	10	0	1328	1292	50.69%	12									
Renmark	3	0	13	0	942	1849	33.75%	6									

== 2016 Ladder ==
Riverland	Wins	Byes	Losses	Draws	For	Against	%	Pts	Final	Team	G	B	Pts	Team	G	B	Pts
Waikerie	14	0	2	0	1685	849	66.50%	28	1st Semi	Loxton North	25	9	159	Berri	9	8	62
Barmera-Monash	10	0	6	0	1583	1057	59.96%	20	2nd Semi	Waikerie	11	9	75	Barmera-Monash	9	11	65
Loxton North	10	0	6	0	1359	1161	53.93%	20	Preliminary	Barmera-Monash	14	14	98	Loxton North	8	10	58
Berri	8	0	8	0	1266	1111	53.26%	16	Grand	Waikerie	17	9	111	Barmera-Monash	10	9	69
Renmark	5	0	11	0	1067	1460	42.22%	10									
Loxton	1	0	15	0	783	2105	27.11%	2									

== 2017 Ladder ==
Riverland	Wins	Byes	Losses	Draws	For	Against	%	Pts	Final	Team	G	B	Pts	Team	G	B	Pts
Waikerie	16	0	0	0	2250	751	74.98%	32	1st Semi	Barmera-Monash	9	14	68	Renmark	9	8	62
Loxton North	10	0	6	0	1631	1141	58.84%	20	2nd Semi	Waikerie	12	7	79	Loxton North	9	9	63
Renmark	10	0	6	0	1586	1299	54.97%	20	Preliminary	Loxton North	13	16	94	Barmera-Monash	8	13	61
Barmera-Monash	8	0	8	0	1649	1205	57.78%	16	Grand	Waikerie	17	8	110	Loxton North	13	10	88
Loxton	4	0	12	0	1125	1593	41.39%	8									
Berri	0	0	16	0	473	2725	14.79%	0									

== 2018 Ladder ==
Riverland	Wins	Byes	Losses	Draws	For	Against	%	Pts	Final	Team	G	B	Pts	Team	G	B	Pts
Waikerie	15	0	1	0	2092	717	74.47%	30	1st Semi	Loxton	11	4	70	Loxton North	7	11	53
Renmark	13	0	3	0	1942	904	68.24%	26	2nd Semi	Waikerie	10	13	73	Renmark	5	13	43
Loxton North	8	0	8	0	1214	1357	47.22%	16	Preliminary	Renmark	20	17	137	Loxton	6	7	43
Loxton	5	0	11	0	1069	1608	39.93%	10	Grand	Waikerie	11	13	79	Renmark	3	15	33
Barmera-Monash	4	0	12	0	945	2091	31.13%	8									
Berri	3	0	13	0	1053	1638	39.13%	6									

== 2019 Ladder ==
Riverland	Wins	Byes	Losses	Draws	For	Against	%	Pts	Final	Team	G	B	Pts	Team	G	B	Pts
Waikerie	14	0	2	0	2152	684	75.88%	38	1st Semi	Loxton North	9	3	57	Bamera-Monash	6	10	46
Renmark	13	0	3	0	1654	789	67.70%	26	2nd Semi	Waikerie	13	9	87	Renmark	9	11	65
Bamera-Monash	10	0	6	0	1196	1079	52.57%	20	Preliminary	Renmark	18	13	121	Loxton North	8	4	52
Loxton North	6	0	10	0	1002	1516	39.79%	12	Grand	Renmark	13	19	87	Waikerie	9	15	69
Berri	4	0	12	0	900	1564	36.53%	8									
Loxton	1	0	15	0	693	1965	26.07%	2									

== 2020 Ladder (U18's) ==
Riverland	Wins	Byes	Losses	Draws	For	Against	%	Pts	Final	Team	G	B	Pts	Team	G	B	Pts
Berri	8	2	0	0	857	208	80.47%	16	1st Semi	Waikerie	8	9	57	Renmark	4	3	27
Loxton North	6	2	2	0	629	369	63.03%	12	2nd Semi	Berri	11	6	72	Loxton North	7	5	47
Wakierie	4	2	4	0	485	568	46.06%	8	Preliminary	Loxton North	4	7	31	Waikerie	2	4	16
Renmark	2	2	6	0	440	530	45.36%	4	Grand	Loxton North	8	5	53	Berri	7	7	49
Loxton	0	2	8	0	136	872	13.49%	0									
Bamera-Monash	0	0	0	0	0	0	0%	0									

== 2021 Ladder ==
Riverland	Wins	Byes	Losses	Draws	For	Against	%	Pts	Final	Team	G	B	Pts	Team	G	B	Pts
Waikerie	12	0	1	0	1149	529	217.20%	24	1st Semi	Renmark	18	16	124	Berri	7	11	53
Loxton	10	0	3	0	1112	784	141.84%	20	2nd Semi	Waikerie	16	8	104	Loxton	4	6	30
Renmark	9	0	4	0	1238	554	223.47%	18	Preliminary	Renmark	15	17	107	Loxton	4	4	28
Berri	5	0	8	0	755	1038	72.74%	10	Grand	Renmark	9	9	63	Waikerie	4	5	29
Barmera Monash	2	0	10	1	608	1186	51.26%	5									
Loxton North	0	0	15	1	569	1340	42.46%	1									

== 2022 Ladder ==
Riverland	Wins	Byes	Losses	Draws	For	Against	%	Pts	Final	Team	G	B	Pts	Team	G	B	Pts
Renmark	14	0	1	0	1395	530	263.21%	28	1st Semi	Loxton	11	8	74	Berri	10	6	66
Waikerie	10	0	5	0	1017	786	129.39%	20	2nd Semi	Renmark	14	5	89	Waikerie	5	3	33
Loxton	10	0	5	0	1004	865	116.07%	20	Preliminary	Waikerie	6	8	44	Loxton	5	9	39
Berri	7	0	8	0	987	1026	96.20%	14	Grand	Renmark	8	15	63	Waikerie	4	8	32
Barmera-Monash	3	0	12	0	723	1297	55.74%	6									
Loxton North	1	0	14	0	667	1289	51.75%	2									

== 2023 Ladder ==
Riverland	Wins	Byes	Losses	Draws	For	Against	%	Pts	Adjusted	Final	Team	G	B	Pts	Team	G	B	Pts
Renmark	12	0	3	0	1139	691	62.24%	20	-4	1st Semi	Barmera Monash	8	5	53	Waikerie	4	5	29
Loxton North	10	0	5	0	1187	790	60.04%	20	0	2nd Semi	Renmark	15	14	104	Loxton North	4	10	34
Barmera Monash	9	0	6	0	793	629	55.76%	18	0	Preliminary	Barmera Monash	6	13	49	Loxton North	4	3	27
Waikerie	7	0	8	0	795	729	52.16%	14	0	Grand	Barmera Monash	5	5	35	Renmark	3	8	26
Loxton	7	0	8	0	1003	1048	48.90%	14	0									
Berri	0	0	15	0	494	1524	24.47%	0	0									

== 2024 Ladder ==
Riverland	Wins	Byes	Losses	Draws	For	Against	%	Pts	Final	Team	G	B	Pts	Team	G	B	Pts
Barmera Monash	13	0	3	0	1081	669	61.77%	26	1st Semi	Waikerie	9	10	64	Loxton	4	4	28
Renmark	12	0	4	0	1302	683	65.59%	24	2nd Semi	Barmera Monash	8	5	53	Renmark	6	14	50
Waikerie	8	0	8	0	1096	835	56.75%	16	Preliminary	Renmark	7	10	52	Waikerie	5	5	35
Loxton	8	0	8	0	1056	1043	50.30%	16	Grand	Renmark	7	10	52	Barmera Monash	4	11	35
Loxton North	5	0	11	0	763	1191	39.04%	10									
Berri	2	0	14	0	646	1522	29.76%	4									
