= Loxton North Football Club =

Loxton North

Names
- Full name: Loxton North Football Club
- Nickname(s): Panthers

Club details
- Founded: 1954
- Colours: Blue White
- Competition: Riverland Football League
- Premierships: 9 (1979, 1997, 1998, 1999, 2000, 2004, 2011, 2013, 2015)
- Ground(s): Balfour Ogilvy Ave, Loxton North

The Loxton North Football Club are an Australian rules football club which compete in the Riverland Football League. The club was formed in 1954 and competed in the Upper Murray "B" grade competition. In 1964 the club was promoted to A grade.

== Premierships ==
- 1979, 1997, 1998, 1999, 2000, 2004, 2011, 2013, 2015

== Books ==
- The encyclopedia of South Australian Country Football Clubs. Peter Lines ISBN 9780980447293
