= Alby Yeo =

Australian rules footballer

Personal information
- Full name: Albert Yeo
- Died: 10 June 2014 (aged 84); Barmera
- Original team: West Adelaide
- Height: 177 cm (5 ft 10 in)
- Weight: 76 kg (168 lb)
- Position: Back pocket

Playing career^{1}
Years	Club	Games (Goals)
1958	Essendon	5 (0)
- ^{1} Playing statistics correct to the end of 1958.

Albert Yeo (died 10 June 2014) was an Australian rules footballer who played for the Essendon Football Club in the Victorian Football League (VFL). Essendon cleared Yeo to fellow VFL side St Kilda midway through the 1958 season, but he did not play any senior games for them.

Originally from Barmera in the Riverland region, he previously played for Glenelg and West Adelaide in the South Australian National Football League. He was named in the Riverland Football League's Team of the Century in 2009.
