= Tony Burgess (footballer) =

Australian rules footballer (born 1961)

Personal information
- Full name: Anthony Burgess
- Born: 13 February 1961 (age 65)
- Height: 188 cm (6 ft 2 in)
- Weight: 83 kg (183 lb)
- Position: Full-back

Playing career^{1}
| Years | Club | Games (Goals) |
| 1980–84, 1987–93 | West Adelaide | 185 |
| 1985–1986 | Collingwood | 21 (2) |

Representative team honours
| Years | Team | Games (Goals) |
| 1988 | South Australia | 1 (?) |

Coaching career
| Years | Club | Games (W–L–D) |
| 2005 | Glenelg | 4 (0–4–0) |
- ^{1} Playing statistics correct to the end of 1986.

Career highlights
- West Adelaide premiership player 1983; West Adelaide life member 1988; Christies Beach Best and Fairest 1991

Anthony Burgess (born 13 February 1961) is a former Australian rules footballer who played with Collingwood in the Victorian Football League (VFL) and West Adelaide in the South Australian National Football League (SANFL).

== Playing career ==
Burgess, who started his SANFL career in 1980, was a full-back in West Adelaide's 1983 premiership team. Going into the Grand Final battling a hamstring injury, coach Neil Kerley assigned Burgess had the task of playing on Sturt's champion full-forward Rick Davies who was sitting on 149 goals for the season. In West Adelaide's two minor round games against Sturt in 1983, Kerley had tried Peter Winter on the man the called the "Jumbo Prince", and he had kicked 15 goals. Burgess managed to restrict Davies to two goals in the Grand Final at Football Park. With Davies regarded as Sturt's main danger, Burgess' effort on him played a large role in the Bloods' 34 point win, though he largely credits West Adelaide's backline for restricting Sturt and Davies and plays down his own roll on the day.

During 1983, Burgess actually moved from Adelaide to Melbourne and trained with the Sydney Swans when they were in Melbourne before flying to Adelaide to take his place for West Adelaide.

After West Adelaide missed the finals in 1984, Burgess signed with Collingwood to play in the VFL.

Burgess made 21 VFL appearances for Collingwood; nine in 1985 and 12 in 1986. At the end of the 1986 season, Burgess was one of the three players that Collingwood offered to the Brisbane Bears, as each club had to, but he instead returned to West Adelaide.

Burgess went on to play for West Adelaide until the end of the 1993 SANFL season, retiring after playing 185 senior games for the club.

== Coaching ==
Burgess coached the West Adelaide under-19s to a premiership in 2002, after what had been a tough year for the club, which had lost player Jake Watson (the son of Burgess' 1983 premiership winning teammate Larry Watson), who died after collapsing on the field during a match.

He next joined Glenelg's coaching panel and towards the end of the 2005 season was the caretaker senior coach, following the sacking of Peter Simmons.

At South Adelaide he spent time as both the reserves coach and a senior assistant.

In October 2012 he was announced as the new coach of Strathalbyn.
