= Abbey Holmes =

Australian rules footballer

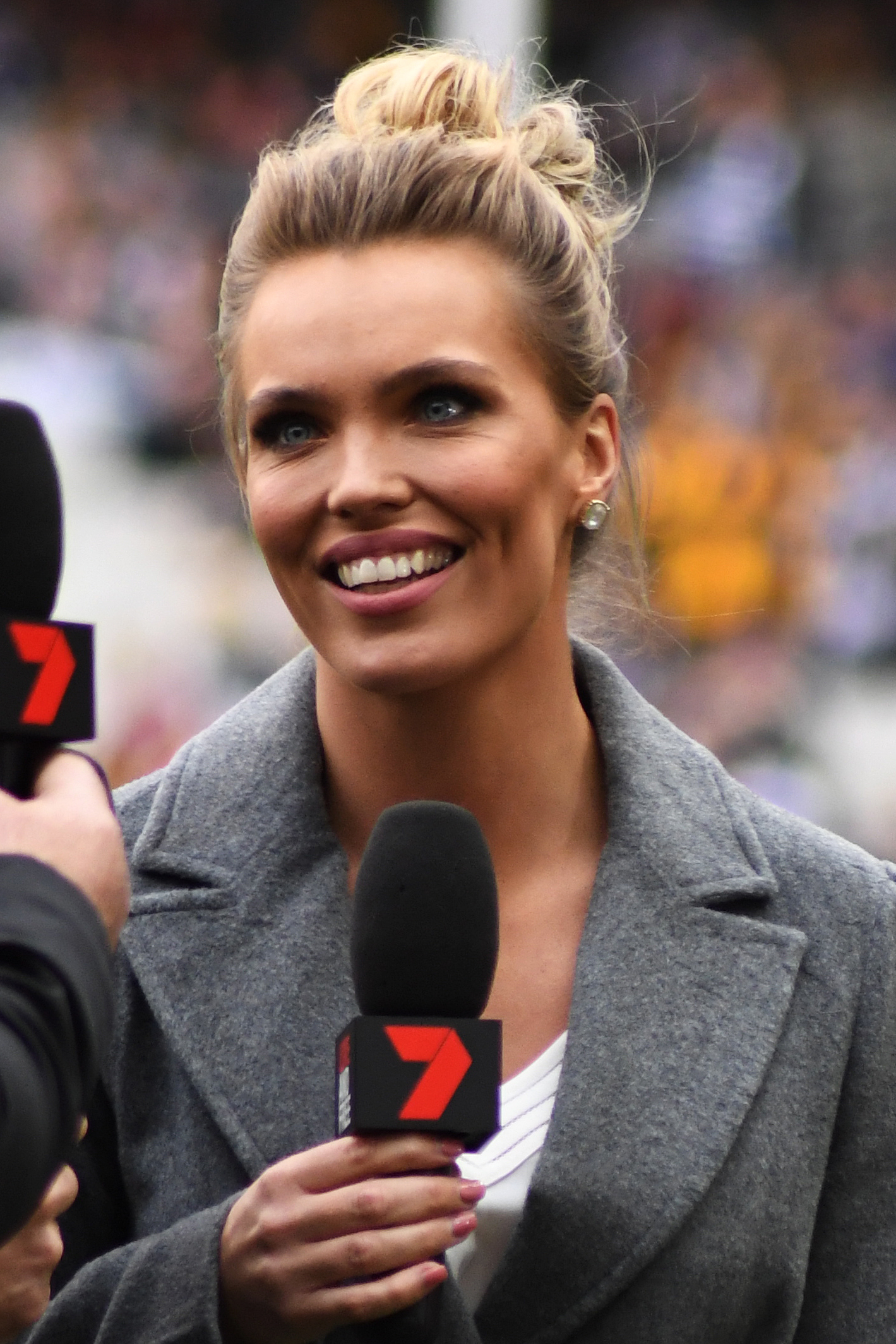
- Holmes working with Seven Network in April 2019

Personal information
- Born: 7 January 1991 (age 35); Victor Harbor, South Australia
- Original team: Waratah (NTFL)
- Draft: No. 103, 2016 AFL Women's draft
- Debut: Round 1, 2017, Adelaide vs. Greater Western Sydney, at Thebarton Oval
- Height: 170 cm (5 ft 7 in)
- Position: Forward

Playing career^{1}
Years	Club	Games (Goals)
2017–2018	Adelaide	11 (3)
- ^{1} Playing statistics correct to the end of the 2018 season.

Career highlights
- AFLW premiership player: 2017

Abbey C. Holmes (/hɒlmz/ HOLMZ; born 7 January 1991) is a former Australian rules footballer who played for the Adelaide Football Club in the AFL Women's (AFLW). She began playing football for the Waratah Football Club in the Northern Territory Football League in 2012 and won four consecutive premierships with the club, along with being the league's leading goalkicker the same four seasons. In 2014, she became the first woman to kick 100 goals in a season in an established football league, and in 2016 she was drafted in the inaugural AFL Women's draft by Adelaide.

In 2019, Holmes competed in the sixth season of Australian Survivor. She was eliminated on day 46 and finished in fifth place. She returned to Australian Survivor All Stars the following season where she placed nineteenth.

== Early life and netball career ==
Holmes was born in Victor Harbor in South Australia. Her father was the president of the Victor Harbor Football Club and her mother was heavily involved in the local netball club. She started playing netball in Victor Harbor and continued when her family moved to Adelaide when she was ten years old.

At the age of 15, Holmes made her debut in South Australia's state netball league and in the same year she represented South Australia at the Australian National Netball Championships. By the age of 16, she was representing Australia in an international schoolgirls tournament. She continued playing netball at a high level and was going to represent South Australia in a national under-19 championship, but she injured her knee two weeks before the tournament and was unable to participate.

== Football career ==
=== Early career (2012–2016) ===
Holmes moved to Darwin in the Northern Territory with her partner, Nathan Brown, in 2012 so that Brown, who had previously played in the South Australian National Football League for West Adelaide and North Adelaide, could play in the Northern Territory Football League (NTFL) during the summer (most Australian rules leagues are played in winter). Holmes had planned to continue playing netball in Darwin, but she also began playing football for Waratah Football Club in the women's competition of the NTFL. She played football in the summer and netball in the winter, as the seasons did not overlap. Holmes immediately had success in the NTFL. In her first four seasons, she was both the league's leading goalkicker and a premiership player with Waratah, becoming one of the highest-profile female footballers in the Northern Territory.

In 2014, Holmes became the first woman to kick 100 goals in a season in an established women's football league, kicking 105 goals across 15 games in the 2013–14 NTFL season. She kicked seven or more goals in a single match on nine occasions and kicked ten or more thrice, including kicking 16 goals and five behinds in a match against Tracy Village. As a result of her achievement, she was mentioned by name in Federal Parliament.

Holmes' success in the NTFL led to her being selected to play in various exhibition matches. She played in a West End Slowdown, sharing player-of-the-match honours with Adelaide legend Andrew McLeod and played in two E. J. Whitten Legends Games. Despite this, she was consistently overlooked by the Melbourne Football Club and the Western Bulldogs, who played annual exhibition matches. After missing out on the 2014 match, she asked then–Melbourne coach Michelle Cowan what she needed to do to improve her game and she was told that her game was too one-dimensional. Rather than staying at full-forward she needed to be able to help her team further up the field, so she started to work on this.

During the 2016 NTFL Grand Final, in which Holmes won her fourth consecutive premiership, she suffered torn rib cartilage. The nature of the injury meant there was no rehabilitation beyond just resting and waiting for it to heal. In 2016, she played two exhibition matches representing the Northern Territory, but in both matches she re-tore the cartilage. She was meant to play for the St Kilda Sharks in the Victorian Women's Football League in the 2016 season, but the recurring injury meant she was unable to do anything beyond train. Instead, Holmes started to work for the Seven Network as the boundary rider for their coverage of the Victorian Football League. At the end of the year she also presented the Goal of the Year award to Adelaide player Eddie Betts.

=== AFLW career (2017–2018) ===
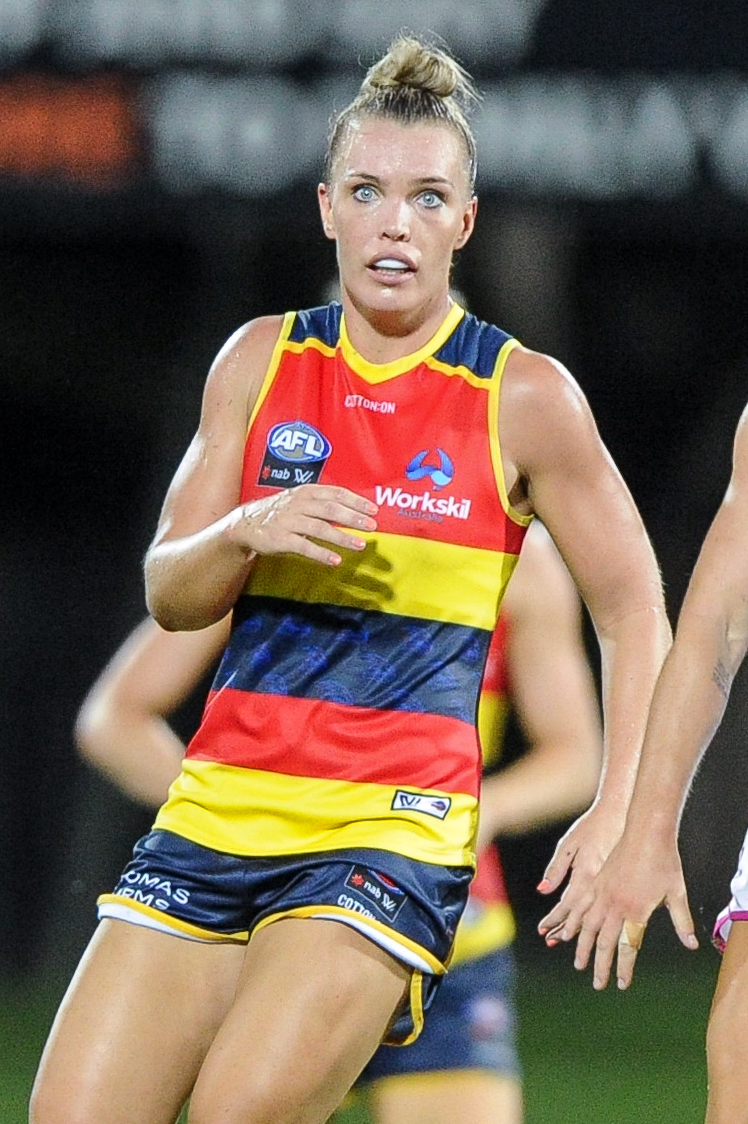
Holmes playing for Adelaide in 2018

Holmes was drafted by the Adelaide Football Club with their thirteenth selection and 103rd overall in the 2016 AFL Women's draft, the team she had been supporting for her entire life. Going into the inaugural 2017 AFL Women's season, she was expected to be one of Adelaide's star players, but for the first match of the season she wasn't initially selected to play, only being listed as an emergency replacement. She was a late inclusion into the team and made her debut in the thirty-six point win against Greater Western Sydney at Thebarton Oval.

Holmes played every match of the season to finish with eight matches, leading the team in handballs. Her best performance came in round four against Fremantle when she accumulated 15 possessions, three tackles and kicked a goal. She was part of Adelaide's premiership side after the club defeated Brisbane by six points at Metricon Stadium in the AFL Women's Grand Final.

Adelaide re-signed Holmes for the 2018 season during the trade period in May 2017. She was delisted by Adelaide at the end of the 2018 season.

== Player profile ==
Holmes primarily plays as a forward. She is capable of taking strong marks both overhead and on a lead. Since 2014, she has also worked on adding more to her game, and now she is able to rotate through the midfield.

== Outside of football ==
In addition to playing Australian rules football and netball, Holmes has also participated in bodybuilding contests. She is a real estate agent and has done work as a part-time model. She also participated in Australia Survivor. Since 2018, Holmes has been a commentator for the Seven Network for its AFL and AFLW coverage working as expert commentator and boundary rider, in July 2022 she was a part of the commentary team for the network's coverage of the 2022 Commonwealth Games in Birmingham.

== Personal life ==
Holmes got engaged to former AFL player Keegan Brooksby in November 2020.

In June 2025, Holmes gave birth to a son, Braxton.

On 26 July 2026, Holmes announced that she was expecting her second child.
