= Renmark Rovers Football Club =

Renmark Football Club

Names
- Full name: Renmark Rovers Football Club
- Nickname: The Rovers

2021 season
- After finals: Premiers
- Leading goalkicker: Tom Charlton
- Best and fairest: Matt Woolford

Club details
- Founded: 1923
- Colours: Blue and white
- Competition: Riverland Football League
- Chairperson: Mark Trowse
- Coach: Josh Vater
- Captain: Matt Woolford
- Ground: Renmark Oval

Other information
- Official website: Renmark Rovers FC Website

The Renmark Rovers Football Club is an Australian rules football club located in Renmark, South Australia. The club formed in 1923 as a result of a merger between the Fairview Rovers and the Renmark Town FC. They compete in the Riverland Football League (RFL) where they have won 21 premierships, the most recent in 2021. The club, formed in 1909, celebrated their centennial in June 2009.

In 2019, the A grade team were premiers breaking a 10 year drought. Josh Vater was playing coach with Matt Woolford captaining the team. With the RFL competition canceled in 2020 due to the COVID-19 pandemic the A grade team in 2021 defended their title and went back to back for the first time since 1981–82.

In 2021 the RRFC demonstrated its dominance by taking out 3 premierships (A-grade, B-grade, U13's) and runner up in the U 18's.

In 2021 Tim Woolford was awarded the Whillas medal as the Best & Fairest player in the RFL.

In 2018, the A grade Team finished runner up under the Coaching of Life Member Matt Martinson.

2018 also saw Renmark Rovers FC enter a Women's team to the new Riverland Football Association Women's Competition.

Tony Modra, who went on to a successful career in the Australian Football League, played for Renmark during their 1990 Grand Final campaign.

Renmark Rovers Football Club has also been the proving ground for numerous successful AFL and SANFL Players including Mark Mickan, Phil Morris, Bruce Lindner, Greg Dempsey, Jack Agostino and current player Nick Gillard (Central District FC)
