= West End Slowdown =

The West End Slowdown was an annual charity Australian rules football match run by the Little Heroes Foundation, formerly named the McGuinness–McDermott Foundation, to raise funds to improve oncology treatment for South Australian children.

The match is held at the end of the regular AFL season, with teams drawn mostly from retired AFL and SANFL players, augmented with a sprinkling of celebrities who over the years have included former World number 1 tennis player Lleyton Hewitt, singer Guy Sebastian and Australian media personality and actor Andrew Daddo. The ex-players competing are mostly those who represented either the Adelaide Crows or the Port Adelaide Power during their AFL career, even if they only played a minimal number of games for the club.

Port Adelaide can call on ex-Port Adelaide Magpies players while the Crows can usually call on any player who has ever been on their playing list, including ex-Port Magpies players who played at the Crows. Players who played for both the Magpies and the Crows have the option of choosing who they play for, e.g. Greg Anderson who started his senior career with the Magpies in the SANFL in 1983, played 121 games for the club and won the Magarey Medal in 1986 and Magpies premierships in 1995 and '96, plays for the "Crows" in the Slowdown. David Brown who also started with the Magpies, was an inaugural Crows member and played 69 games for the club and played also for the Power in the AFL represents the "Power" in Slowdowns.

Regular players/coaches in the Slowdown over the years have been the likes of inaugural Crows and Power coaches Graham Cornes and John Cahill, 1997 Coleman Medallist Tony Modra, Magarey Medallists Tony McGuinness (co-founder of the MM-Foundation), Greg Anderson, Andrew Jarman, Scott Hodges and Grantley Fielke, Brownlow Medallists Gavin Wanganeen and Mark Ricciuto as well as various Crows and Port premiership players as well as co-founder of the McGuinness–McDermott Foundation and inaugural Adelaide Crows club captain Chris McDermott.

In both 2004 and 2011 a State of Origin Slowdown was held at the Adelaide Oval between South Australia and Victoria. Former 1990 Collingwood premiership player Doug Barwick had the chance after the final siren to win the game for Victoria in 2004 but his 52m kick was deemed to be only a point, giving SA the win by just 4 points.

In 2011 the game supported the Little Heroes Foundation and the Reach Foundation, a youth charity started by 1991 Brownlow Medallist Jim Stynes. The game, played in a great spirit, saw many lead changes with the Victoria holding a 20-point lead in the third quarter. South Australia mounted a comeback and with only 20 seconds left in the game, former North Adelaide, Hawthorn and Adelaide Crows premiership player Darren Jarman kicked a goal to give the Croweaters the victory by a single point. Despite playing on the losing side, Brendan Fevola, the only player still actively playing football, won the West End Slowdown Medal as best on ground.

The games have been generally well supported, with crowds of around 10–15,000 attending most games. Some games such as Slowdown VI in 2005, saw a crowd of around 25,000, with the entry fee being only a gold coin donation (A$1 or $2) with all gate takings going to the Little Heroes Foundation. The 2011 State of Origin Slowdown had an entry fee of $5 and saw a crowd of around 12,000.

In 2007, the event moved from its home at the Adelaide Oval to the SANFL's AAMI Stadium, due to the Oval being used for cricket by its major tenant, the Southern Redbacks. The game remained at AAMI for 2008 before moving back to the Adelaide Oval in 2009. The 2009 game was the first Slowdown to be played under lights. In 2011, the State of Origin Slowdown was played in the afternoon timeslot, with a 1:40 pm start.

Out of 11 games, the Adelaide Crows have won six, while Port Adelaide Power have won five, including four of the last five games. South Australia leads Victoria 2–0 in State of Origin Slowdowns.

== Results ==
Slowdown #	Venue	Year	Port Adelaide	Adelaide	Collingwood	South Australia	Victoria	SA Legends	Indigenous All Stars	Slowdown Medal
Slowdown I	Adelaide Oval	2000	17.6 (108)	15.8 (98)						
Slowdown II	Adelaide Oval	2001	6.15 (51)	10.8 (68)						
Slowdown III	Adelaide Oval	2002	13.11 (89)	14.6 (90)						
Slowdown IV	Adelaide Oval	2003	11.9 (75)	15.11 (101)						
State of Origin	Adelaide Oval	2004				17.7 (109)	16.9 (105)			
Slowdown V	Adelaide Oval	2004	12.4 (76)	17.7 (109)						
Slowdown VI	Adelaide Oval	2005	10.4 (64)	14.13 (97)						
Slowdown VII	Adelaide Oval	2006	16.10 (106)	13.9 (87)						
Slowdown VIII	AAMI Stadium	2007	17.10 (112)	15.6 (96)						
Slowdown IX	AAMI Stadium	2008	12.14 (86)	17.7 (109)						
Slowdown X	Adelaide Oval	2009	13.10 (88)	12.13 (85)						
Slowdown XI	Adelaide Oval	2010	17.13 (115)	17.7 (109)						
State of Origin	Adelaide Oval	2011				17.10 (112)	17.9 (111)			Brendan Fevola (Vic)
Slowdown 2012	Glenelg Oval	2012		16.12 (108)	17.7 (107)					
Slowdown 2013	Alberton Oval	2013	16.11 (107)	20.8 (128)						Tony Modra (Crows)
Slowdown 2014	Alberton Oval	2014	9.13 (67)	15.8 (98)						Andrew McLeod (Crows), Abbey Holmes (Crows)
Slowdown 2015	Adelaide Oval	2015	14.12 (96)	11.18 (84)						Thanasi Kokkinakis (Port)
Slowdown 2016	Glenelg Oval	2016						17.12 (114)	17.16 (118)	Eddie Hocking (Indigenous All Stars)
