= Shaun Rehn =

Australian rules footballer, born 1971

Personal information
- Full name: Shaun Jason Rehn
- Born: 17 August 1971 (age 55); Arno Bay, South Australia
- Original team: West Adelaide (SANFL)
- Height: 203 cm (6 ft 8 in)
- Weight: 106 kg (16 st 10 lb; 234 lb)
- Position: Ruck

Playing career^{1}
| Years | Club | Games (Goals) |
| 1991–2000 | Adelaide | 134 (55) |
| 2001–2002 | Hawthorn | 33 (7) |
| Total | | 167 (62) |

Representative team honours
| Years | Team | Games (Goals) |
| 1994, 1998 | South Australia | 2 (0) |

Coaching career
| Years | Club | Games (W–L–D) |
| 2003–2005 | West Adelaide (SANFL) | 70 (27–43–0) |
- ^{1} Playing statistics correct to the end of 2005.

Career highlights
- AFL Premiership Player (1997, 1998); All-Australian Team (1994, 1998); Malcolm Blight Medal (1994); Australian International Rules Representative; Adelaide Team of the Decade - Ruck; Adelaide Football Club Life Member (2000); South Australian Football Hall of Fame Inductee (2006)

Shaun Jason Rehn (born 17 August 1971) is a former professional Australian rules footballer who played for the Adelaide Football Club and the Hawthorn Football Club in the Australian Football League (AFL).

== Early career ==
Rehn grew up on a farm near Arno Bay, South Australia, playing junior football for Arno Bay in the Eastern Eyre Football League (EEFL). It wasn't until Rehn attended Immanuel College in Adelaide that he believed he could play league football. Rehn was invited to try out for the West Adelaide Under-19s despite being from the Port Adelaide country zone. He made his senior debut for West Adelaide in the 1990 SANFL season, playing two games; Rehn was then selected in the Adelaide Crows inaugural 52-man squad, wearing number 52.

== AFL career ==
At 19 Rehn started his AFL career in 1991 with the Adelaide Crows in their inaugural year in the Australian Football League. After some eye catching performances for West Adelaide (who were making a late season charge to the SANFL finals), he made his debut for the Crows against Sydney in Round 18 of the 1991 AFL season at Football Park in Adelaide.

At 6 ft 8 in (203 cm) he became a leading ruckmen, but suffered three ACL knee injuries overall on both knees which limited his playing ability. The last of those injuries was sustained when his good knee buckled and twisted after running onto a small rubber circle installed in the centre of the turf ground; the circles had been installed onto grounds to assist umpires with centre bounces, but Rehn's injury, and subsequent legal action, saw the circles swiftly removed from all grounds. Rehn's injury kept him on the sidelines for most of the 1996 season after having spent much of the previous season out with the same injury. His knee injuries restricted him to just 6 games in those two seasons, three in each.

Rehn played 134 games and kicked 55 goals for the Crows between 1991 and 2000 and was a member of the Crows 1997 and 1998 premiership teams, before moving to Hawthorn in 2001 in the twilight of his career. He played 33 games and kicked 7 goals with the Hawks between 2001–2002 before retiring from AFL football.

Throughout his whole career at both Adelaide and Hawthorn, Rehn wore the #52 guernsey, and holds the record for the most games wearing that number. Such high numbers are rare in Australian football, as players with numbers higher than 40 usually exchange them for lower numbers early in their careers. Rehn played in jumper #16 when he played for West Adelaide. Rehn also wore 46 when he started at West Adelaide.

== Statistics ==
Legend
| G | Goals | K | Kicks | D | Disposals | T | Tackles |
| B | Behinds | H | Handballs | M | Marks | H/O | Hit-outs |

| Season | Team | No. | Games | Totals | | | | | | | | Averages (per game) | | | | | | | |
| Season | Team | No. | Games | G | B | K | H | D | M | T | H/O | G | B | K | H | D | M | T | H/O |
|---|---|---|---|---|---|---|---|---|---|---|---|---|---|---|---|---|---|---|---|
| 1991 | Adelaide | 52 | 6 | 3 | 1 | 42 | 35 | 77 | 32 | 3 | 47 | 0.5 | 0.2 | 7.0 | 5.8 | 12.8 | 5.3 | 0.5 | 7.8 |
| 1992 | Adelaide | 52 | 20 | 5 | 0 | 131 | 183 | 314 | 111 | 13 | 272 | 0.3 | 0.0 | 6.6 | 9.2 | 15.7 | 5.6 | 0.7 | 13.6 |
| 1993 | Adelaide | 52 | 17 | 6 | 3 | 104 | 198 | 302 | 110 | 19 | 253 | 0.4 | 0.2 | 6.1 | 11.6 | 17.8 | 6.5 | 1.1 | 14.9 |
| 1994 | Adelaide | 52 | 21 | 5 | 8 | 154 | 236 | 390 | 149 | 33 | 401 | 0.2 | 0.4 | 7.3 | 11.2 | 18.6 | 7.1 | 1.6 | 19.1 |
| 1995 | Adelaide | 52 | 3 | 4 | 3 | 25 | 26 | 51 | 14 | 2 | 15 | 1.3 | 1.0 | 8.3 | 8.7 | 17.0 | 4.7 | 0.7 | 5.0 |
| 1996 | Adelaide | 52 | 3 | 2 | 0 | 12 | 8 | 20 | 5 | 1 | 19 | 0.7 | 0.0 | 4.0 | 2.7 | 6.7 | 1.7 | 0.3 | 6.3 |
| 1997 | Adelaide | 52 | 22 | 11 | 15 | 153 | 112 | 265 | 93 | 27 | 264 | 0.5 | 0.7 | 7.0 | 5.1 | 12.0 | 4.2 | 1.2 | 12.0 |
| 1998 | Adelaide | 52 | 26 | 5 | 11 | 270 | 176 | 446 | 148 | 38 | 566 | 0.2 | 0.4 | 10.4 | 6.8 | 17.2 | 5.7 | 1.5 | 21.8 |
| 1999 | Adelaide | 52 | 0 | — | — | — | — | — | — | — | — | — | — | — | — | — | — | — | — |
| 2000 | Adelaide | 52 | 16 | 14 | 8 | 117 | 92 | 209 | 67 | 21 | 189 | 0.9 | 0.5 | 7.3 | 5.8 | 13.1 | 4.2 | 1.3 | 11.8 |
| 2001 | Hawthorn | 52 | 16 | 6 | 4 | 114 | 69 | 183 | 63 | 17 | 177 | 0.4 | 0.3 | 7.1 | 4.3 | 11.4 | 3.9 | 1.1 | 11.1 |
| 2002 | Hawthorn | 52 | 17 | 1 | 3 | 84 | 67 | 151 | 40 | 34 | 262 | 0.1 | 0.2 | 4.9 | 3.9 | 8.9 | 2.4 | 2.0 | 15.4 |
| Career | | | 167 | 62 | 56 | 1206 | 1202 | 2408 | 832 | 208 | 2465 | 0.4 | 0.3 | 7.2 | 7.2 | 14.4 | 5.0 | 1.2 | 14.8 |

== Post-playing career ==
From 2003 to 2005, Rehn was the coach of the West Adelaide Football Club in the SANFL, leading them to the Grand Final in his debut season as coach.

In 2006, Rehn joined the Brisbane Lions as ruck coach where he helped develop Brisbane's young ruck division including Jamie Charman, Cameron Wood and Matthew Leuenberger.

In 2010, Rehn coached the Byron Bay Magpies under-14 side in the Northern Rivers League.

In 2011 Rehn coached South Australia in the 2011 State of Origin Slowdown to a 17.10 (112) to 17.9 (111) victory over Victoria in a charity match at the Adelaide Oval for the Little Heroes Foundation and the Reach Foundation youth charities started by former Melbourne ruckman and 1991 Brownlow Meadallist Jim Stynes.

On 19 October 2011, Port Adelaide announced that Rehn would be an assistant coach at the club.
