= Loxton Football Club =

Loxton

Names
- Full name: Loxton Football Club
- Nickname(s): Tigers

Club details
- Founded: 1908
- Colours: Black Yellow
- Competition: Riverland Football League
- Premierships: 21 (1946, 1947, 1948, 1949, 1951, 1953, 1955, 1957, 1958, 1960, 1961, 1962, 1963, 1964, 1965, 1970, 1971, 1976, 1988, 1996, 2006 )
- Ground(s): Loxton Oval, Loxton

The Loxton Football Club is an Australian rules football club which compete in the Riverland Football League.

== History ==
The club was formed in 1908 and played their first game against Lyrup.

Throughout the 1920s the club maintained a presence in the local Loxton District Football Association.

In 1930 it was decided to field two teams in the local district competition, the Imperials and the Olympicians. It remained that way until the advent of WWII

Reforming after the war the club joined the Upper Murray Football Association and was an immediate success winning the first four premiers it competed in. The club was so strong it won 15 premierships in its first twenty years.

== Premierships ==
- 1946, 1947, 1948, 1949, 1951, 1953, 1955, 1957, 1958, 1960, 1961, 1962, 1963, 1964, 1965, 1970, 1971, 1976, 1988, 1996, 2006

== Notable players ==
- Russell Ebert - Port Adelaide
- Grantley Fielke - Collingwood, Adelaide

== Books ==
- Lines, P. The encyclopedia of South Australian Country Football Clubs. ISBN 9780980447293.
