= Michael Smith (Australian footballer) =

Australian rules footballer

Personal information
- Full name: Michael Damian Smith
- Born: 28 April 1959 (age 67)
- Original team: South Districts
- Height: 191 cm (6 ft 3 in)
- Weight: 88 kg (194 lb)
- Position: Half-forward flank

Playing career^{1}
Years	Club	Games (Goals)
1977–1981	South Melbourne (VFL)	32 (43)
1982–1986	West Adelaide (SANFL)	85 (182)
Total		117 (225)
- ^{1} Playing statistics correct to the end of 1986.

Career highlights
- VFL debut: Round 10, 1977 South Melbourne vs Collingwood at Victoria Park; SANFL debut with West Adelaide on 3 April 1982; West Adelaide Premiership player 1983

Michael Damian Smith (born 28 April 1959) is a former Australian rules footballer who played with South Melbourne in the Victorian Football League (VFL) and with West Adelaide in the South Australian National Football League (SANFL).

== Career ==
=== South Melbourne ===
Smith played his football as a centre half-forward. He kicked five goals on his South Melbourne debut, in round 10 of the 1977 VFL season, against Collingwood. During the 1981 VFL season, Smith was cleared to Richmond but wouldn't play a senior VFL game at the club.

Smith was embroiled in controversy in 1981 when it was discovered that he had mistakenly provided incorrect information on his permit to play for South Melbourne. The discrepancy was in his address; his grandmother's South Melbourne address was on the permit but in reality Smith lived in Caulfied, which was in St Kilda's zone. As a result South Melbourne were fined heavily and the ladder was altered, to give Hawthorn the four points they missed out on when they played South Melbourne earlier in the season, when Smith made two appearances before joining Richmond. This decision was later reversed.

=== West Adelaide ===
Smith moved to Adelaide in 1982 to join the West Adelaide Football Club. Over the next five seasons he played 85 games and kicked 182 goals, including playing on the half-forward flank in West Adelaide's 1983 SANFL Grand Final win over Sturt at Football Park. While at The Bloods, Smith was coached by two of the greats of South Australian football, Neil Kerley (1982–84) and John Cahill (1985-86).

== Family ==
Smith's great-grandfather Jim McShane played for Geelong, his father, Stan Smith, also played for South Melbourne footballer, while his son Matthew was drafted by Adelaide at the 2000 AFL draft with selection 48.
