= Tom Waye =

Australian rules footballer

Personal information
- Full name: Ivor Thomas Waye
- Born: 28 December 1909; Willunga, South Australia
- Died: 10 February 1992 (aged 82); Victoria, Australia
- Height: 170 cm (5 ft 7 in)
- Weight: 69 kg (152 lb)

Playing career^{1}
Years	Club	Games (Goals)
1929–31	Port Adelaide	54
1932–35	Footscray	53 (43)
- ^{1} Playing statistics correct to the end of 1935.

Ivor Thomas Waye (28 December 1909 – 10 February 1992) was an Australian rules footballer who played with Port Adelaide in the South Australian National Football League (SANFL) and Footscray in the Victorian Football League (VFL).

Waye played his earliest football in Willunga and Renmark, before arriving in Adelaide and competing in the Port Adelaide Church Association.

He started his Port Adelaide career in 1929, by which time he was also representing the suburb in South Australian grade cricket. On the football field he was used mostly as a follower but when not roving was also seen on the wings and half forward flanks. He was a member of the South Australian interstate team which played in the 1930 Adelaide Carnival.

Off the field Waye was a fitter and turner and moved to Melbourne for employment in 1932. His teammate from Port Adelaide, Les Dayman, had also moved to Victoria and both signed to play with Footscray.

Waye polled six Brownlow votes in his first season and in 1934 was Footscray's second leading goal-kicker with 18 goals.
