= Grantley Fielke =

Australian rules footballer (born 1962)

Personal information
- Full name: Grantley Craig Fielke
- Nickname: Fielks
- Born: 18 March 1962 (age 64); Loxton, South Australia
- Original team: West Adelaide (SANFL)
- Draft: No. 19, 1982 interstate draft
- Height: 178 cm (5 ft 10 in)
- Weight: 90 kg (198 lb)
- Positions: Wing, Centre

Playing career^{1}
Years	Club	Games (Goals)
1977–86, 1988–90, 1992–97	West Adelaide (SANFL)	373 (234)
1987	Collingwood (VFL)	16 (15)
1991–92	Adelaide (AFL)	24 (6)
Total		413 (255)
- ^{1} Playing statistics correct to the end of 1997.

Career highlights
- West Adelaide Sam Suckling Medal Winner 1979; West Adelaide Premiership Player 1983; Advertiser News Team of the Year 1984; Magarey Medallist 1985; Advertiser Team of the Year 1985; Advertiser News Team of the Year 1985; West Adelaide Best & Fairest 1990; West Adelaide Captain 1994-96; West Adelaide Games Record Holder (364: 1979-86, 1988–90, 1992–97); SANFL Player Life Member; SANFL West Adelaide Life Member; South Australian Football Hall of Fame Inaugural Inductee 2002; West Adelaide Football Club Hall of Fame Inaugural Inductee 2005; West Adelaide Football Club Greatest Player of All Time 2015; West Adelaide Football Club Coaches Award 'Grantley Fielke Medal' 2015; West Adelaide Football Club Hall of Fame Legend 2016; Riverland Riverland SportsPerson of the Year; South Australia 1985-92: 9 matches

Grantley Craig Fielke (born 18 March 1962 in Loxton, South Australia) is a former Australian rules footballer who played for West Adelaide Football Club in the South Australian National Football League (SANFL), and the Collingwood Football Club and Adelaide Football Club in the Victorian/Australian Football League (VFL/AFL).

== League career ==
Fielke was recruited by the West Adelaide Football Club from their South Australian country zone of the Riverland in 1977 at the age of 15. After taking time to adjust to life in Adelaide (he had never been to the city before), Fielke made his league debut for West Adelaide on 7 April 1979, and keeping his place in the league team for the rest of the season. The Bloods though had a season to forget, winning just 7 of 22 games and finishing last. In his debut season for West Adelaide, Fielke won the Sam Suckling Memorial Medal as the club's best first year player.

Fielke's speed and ball handling ability saw him become a valued member of West Adelaide's senior team. From his debut in 1979 until the end of the 1986 SANFL season, Fielke had played 171 games.

The arrival of Neil Kerley as coach in 1981 saw The Bloods go from being one of the worst to one of the best teams in the SANFL, although at times their famous inconsistency showed through. Fielke's game blossomed under Kerley's hard coaching, although he suffered a setback in 1983 when he twice broke his arm. Fielke battled back and regained his place in the side shortly before the finals, for which West had easily qualified as the minor premier, winning 18 of their 22 regular season games. Fielke then became a member of West Adelaide's first premiership win since 1961 when he came off the bench in their 21.16 (142) to 16.12 (108) win over Sturt in the Grand Final in front of 47,129 fans at Football Park.

West Adelaide obtained the services of former Port Adelaide premiership coach John Cahill in 1985 and Fielke continued to blossom. That season he experienced the individual highlight of his career when he won the Magarey Medal, polling a record 54 votes to defeat pre-count favourite Peter Motley of Sturt who finished with 51 votes. During the 1985 season Fielke led the league in disposals (kicks and handballs), and used the ball very effectively against tough opposition in helping West Adelaide to the preliminary final and a 3rd-place finish. Despite winning the Magarey Medal, Fielke failed to win The Bloods Best & Fairest award which was won by ruckman Mark Mickan.

Fielke was recruited by VFL club Collingwood for the 1987 VFL season and impressed at the club, playing 16 games as a wingman for the Magpies.

After just a single season in the VFL, Fielke returned to Adelaide for family reasons in 1988, playing again for West Adelaide. There he would play another three more seasons, winning the club's Best & Fairest award in 1990. Amazingly, it was Fielke's only Best & Fairest win in his 16 seasons with the club.

With the forming of the Adelaide Crows in late 1990 to play in the now renamed AFL, Fielke was one of the first players signed and played in all 22 games of the 1991 AFL season which saw the Crows finish in ninth place with a 10–12 win–loss record. However, the 30-year-old Fielke suddenly found himself on the outer with coach Graham Cornes and he played only two games in 1992. At the end of the season Fielke was informed his services were no longer required, ending his AFL career with a record of 40 games and 21 goals.

Fielke returned to West Adelaide once more in 1993 and became club captain in 1994, a position he would hold until he announced his retirement at the end of the 1997 season. He finished his SANFL career having played a club record 327 games for West Adelaide: as of the end of the 2025 SANFL season, he is the only West Adelaide player to have played over 300 senior games for the club. Always more comfortable kicking for goal on the run rather than from a set shot, Fielke kicked 234 goals in his 327 SANFL premiership games; including his VFL/AFL career, he kicked 255 goals in 367 elite premiership games.

At the time of his retirement, Fielke's career total of 373 premiership and teal cup matches was ranked equal sixth (with Ralph Sewer) in South Australian elite football behind Peter Carey (423), Russell Ebert (367), Crows coach Graham Cornes (356), Crows teammate and captain Chris McDermott (354), and Paul Bagshaw (353): as of 2022, he is ranked equal ninth behind them, as well as Travis Boak (394), Tyson Edwards and Andrew McLeod (both 363).

Since his football career, Fielke has been involved in numerous West End Slowdown games from the year 2000 to present, which is run by The Little Heroes Foundation. He was an inaugural inductee into the South Australian Football Hall of Fame in 2002.

== Personal ==
Fielke was at one time married to former Australian netball team captain Michelle den Dekker but is now married to Cheryl Fielke and has three children Callum, Bailey, and Abbey. He owned a sporting goods store between 1981 and 2003 (Grantley Fielke's Sports Locker) at the Arndale Shopping Centre in Adelaide. Fielke currently works as a real estate agent manager for First National Real Estate, Gawler. Two of his brothers, Craig and Tony Fielke, also played league football for West Adelaide in the SANFL, and in 1986 all three players played several league games together. His second cousin Aaron Fielke plays with West Adelaide and in Round 8 of the 2014 season notched up his 100th game for the Bloods. In 2015 Fielke polled 64% of votes for being the Greatest West Adelaide Player of All Time.
