= Mark Mickan =

Australian rules footballer & coach (born 1961)

Personal information
- Nickname: Rubbers
- Born: 30 January 1961 (age 65); Renmark, South Australia
- Original team: Renmark Rovers (RFL)
- Draft: 1986 pre-draft selection
- Height: 193 cm (6 ft 4 in)
- Weight: 102 kg (16 st 1 lb; 225 lb)

Playing career^{1}
Years	Club	Games (Goals)
1981–1986; 1991–1994	West Adelaide (SANFL)	139 (38)
1987–1990	Brisbane Bears	48 (26)
1991–1993	Adelaide	37 (12)
Total		224 (76)

Coaching career^{3}
Years	Club	Games (W–L–D)
1998–1999	Woodville-West Torrens (SANFL)	43 (24–19–0)
2006–2011	Glenelg (SANFL)	120 (74–43–3)
2014–2017	West Adelaide (SANFL)	40 (20–20–0)
- ^{1} Playing statistics correct to the end of 1994.^{3} Coaching statistics correct as of 2015.

Career highlights
- West Adelaide best and fairest 1983, 1985, 1986, 1993; West Adelaide club captain 1986; West Adelaide premiership coach 2015; Brisbane Bears captain 1987–1989; Malcolm Blight Medal 1991; 5 state games for South Australia; Fos Williams Medallist 1988; All-Australian team 1988; Adelaide Team of the Decade – Interchange; South Australian Football Hall of Fame inaugural inductee 2002; West Adelaide Hall of Fame inaugural inductee 2005

Mark James Mickan (born 30 January 1961) is a former professional Australian rules footballer who played for the Brisbane Bears and Adelaide Football Club in the Australian Football League (AFL). Mickan began his senior career with South Australian National Football League (SANFL) club West Adelaide in 1981 and finished back at West Adelaide in 1994. All-Australian team selection in 1988 marked the pinnacle of his playing career. He has a sister, Patricia Mickan, who was a basketballer.

He coached SANFL club Woodville-West Torrens in 1998 and 1999, Glenelg from 2006 to June 2011, and West Adelaide from 2014 to 2017. In 2015, Mickan led West Adelaide to the club's first premiership since 1983 when they defeated Woodville-West Torrens by 30 points in the 2015 SANFL Grand Final. It was also Mickan's first premiership as a senior coach.

Mickan was diagnosed with Parkinson's disease in late 2016.

== Playing career ==
Recruited from the Renmark Rovers in West Adelaide's country zone (Riverland Football League), the talented 6 ft 5 in (196 cm) tall ruckman started his SANFL league career in 1981 and quickly established himself alongside Dexter Kennedy as the club's leading ruckman until Kennedy left to join Port Adelaide at the end of 1982. After a stellar 1983 season as The Bloods number one ruckman, Mickan was cruelly robbed of the chance to play in West Adelaide's Grand Final win (the club's first in 22 years) over Sturt due to a torn posterior ligament suffered in Round 20 of the 22 round regular season against Woodville at Football Park in the early game of a double header. His place in the side was taken by 6 ft 7 in (201 cm) tall Dirk de Jong, who had actually retired from league football earlier in the year but was persuaded to come back after Mickan's injury by coach Neil Kerley.

Strong seasons in 1983, 1985 and 1986 resulted in his winning club Best & Fairest awards, while in 1986 West coach John Cahill named him the team captain for the season. Following the 1986 SANFL season in which West Adelaide finished in seventh place, Mickan left to join the new Brisbane Bears playing in the Victorian Football League (VFL) in 1987. Mickan's qualities as a leader and player were instantly recognised with his new club where he was appointed the inaugural captain by coach Peter Knights. This is especially noteworthy given the team included 1986 Collingwood club captain Mark "Chocco" Williams, who was appointed as Mickan's vice-captain, as well as the 1985 Brownlow Medallist Brad Hardie.

While the newly formed side suffered many crises during its early years Mickan's skills were recognised and he was named in the All-Australian Team following the 1988 Bicentennial Carnival played in Adelaide.

Mickan returned to South Australia to play for the newly formed Australian Football League (AFL) team the Adelaide Crows in 1991, winning Adelaide's inaugural Club Champion award despite missing the first three rounds of the season due to Crows coach Graham Cornes early preference for 6 ft 8 in (203 cm) ruckman Romano Negri. While not selected for the Crows opening three games, Mickan played the required three SANFL games with West Adelaide to qualify for SANFL finals football. Mickan became West Adelaide's number one ruckman, and played a prominent role in helping the Kevin Morris coached Bloods to the SANFL Grand Final where they lost to North Adelaide in a spiteful match which featured several all-in brawls.

With younger ruckmen such as Shaun Rehn (West Adelaide) and David Pittman (Norwood) quickly hitting their straps for the Crows and his form dropping, Mickan gradually fell out of favour with The Crows and coach Cornes to the point that he only played two games for the club in 1993, and played the majority of the year with West Adelaide. His form for The Bloods saw Mickan win his fourth club Best & Fairest award under the coaching of his original coach from back in 1981, Neil Kerley.

Following the 1994 SANFL season Mark Mickan retired from league football having played 139 SANFL games with West Adelaide, 48 VFL/AFL games with Brisbane and 37 AFL games with Adelaide between 1981 and 1994. Mickan also represented South Australia on five occasions through his career

== Coaching career ==
After retiring as a player Mickan continued to pursue his football interests as a coach. In 1998–99 seasons he coached Woodville-West Torrens in the SANFL, achieving 6th and 3rd-place finishes. Assistant coaching roles at AFL the Crows and Port Adelaide in the 2000s followed.

In 2006 Mickan was appointed coach of Glenelg on a three-year contract. Glenelg finished sixth in his first year as coach and in 2007 Mickan led the Bays to their first finals appearance since 1999. In the finals they beat Sturt in the Elimination Final before going down to Woodville-West Torrens in the First Semi Final by six points and finished Fourth overall.

In 2008 Mickan was named SANFL coach of the year for Glenelg's rise to the top of the premiership ladder after the minor round.

After a series of disappointing finals' performances in 2009 and 2010 and a belief by the Glenelg board that he could not take the club any further, Mickan was sacked from the Glenelg coaching position on 20 June 2011.

In late 2011 it was announced by West Adelaide that the four time Best & Fairest winner had been appointed the Football Manager at the club from 2012. He left the position before the start of 2013, but was appointed Bloods head coach for the 2014 SANFL season, replacing Andrew Collins who had chosen to return home to Melbourne after 6 years and one Grand Final appearance (2012) with the club.

Although West Adelaide slumped to a 6–12 record in 2014 to finish in 9th place (2nd last) after finishing 2nd in 2012 and 3rd in 2013, they bounced back in 2015 to finish the minor round with an 11–7 record and 3rd place on the SANFL ladder. Mickan then led The Bloods to their second Grand Final appearance in four years and their first premiership since 1983 when Westies defeated Woodville-West Torrens in the 2015 SANFL Grand Final at the Adelaide Oval on 27 September. His contract with West Adelaide was not renewed at the end of the 2017 SANFL season.

In season 2018 Mickan coached the Under 11 juniors at the Henley Sharks Football Club.

Mark Mickan was one of 113 inaugural inductees into the South Australian Football Hall of Fame in 2002 and is also a member of the West Adelaide Football Club Hall of Fame.

Mickan holds degrees in both Teaching and Psychology, currently teaching at St Michael's College, Adelaide.
