= Waikerie Football Club =

Waikerie

Names
- Full name: Waikerie Football Club
- Nickname: Magpies

Club details
- Founded: 1908
- Colours: White Black
- Competition: Riverland Football League
- Premierships: 10 (1974, 1991, 1993, 1994, 2001, 2003, 2005, 2007, 2014, 2016, 2017, 2018) + 2023 RFL Women's Premiership.
- Ground: WAIKERIE Soldiers Memorial Oval, Peake Terrace, Waikerie

The Waikerie Football Club is an Australian rules football club which competes in the Riverland Football League. The club was formed in 1908 and was a founding member of the Mid Murray FL in 1910. It split into two teams in 1927 only to reform in 1929 and enter the Upper Murray "A" grade competition.

== Premierships ==
- 1911, 1912, 1913, 1926, 1934, 1936, 1974, 1991, 1993, 1994, 2001, 2003, 2005, 2007, 2014, 2016, 2017, 2018 + 2023 RFL Women's Premiership, 2026

== Notable players ==
- Russell Ebert
- Mark Ricciuto
- Brad Helbig
- Luke Jericho
- Brooke Hoad

== Books ==
- The encyclopedia of South Australian Country Football Clubs. Peter Lines ISBN 9780980447293
