= Barmera-Monash Football Club =

Barmera-Monash

Names
- Full name: Barmera-Monash Football Club
- Nickname: Roos

Club details
- Founded: 1920
- Colours: Blue Cyan
- Competition: Riverland Football League
- President: Mike Allder
- Coach: Matt Leyson
- Captain(s): Sam Butterworth, Justin Bonney
- Premierships: 8 (1983, 1984, 1985, 1986, 1987, 1989, 2012, 2023)
- Ground: Lakeside Oval, Barmera

The Barmera-Monash Football Club is an Australian rules football club which competes in the Riverland Football League. The club was formed in 1957 following a merger between the Monash and Barmera clubs who both played in Upper Murray Football League. The club developed a reputation as a bridesmaid as it lost the first nine grand finals it played in.

== Premierships ==
- 1921, 1983, 1984, 1985, 1986, 1987, 1989, 2012, 2023, 2025
