= Bruce Lindner =

Australian rules footballer (born 1961)

Personal information
- Born: 20 June 1961 (age 65)
- Original team: West Adelaide (SANFL)
- Height: 185 cm (6 ft 1 in)
- Weight: 87 kg (13 st 10 lb; 192 lb)
- Positions: Half forward, full forward

Playing career^{1}
Years	Club	Games (Goals)
1980-84, 1991-93	West Adelaide	68
1985–90	Geelong	66 (139)
1991–92	Adelaide	19 (27)
- ^{1} Playing statistics correct to the end of 1992.

Career highlights
- Reserves Magarey Medal winner 1981; West Adelaide Premiership player 1983; Geelong leading Goalkicker 1987 (62)

Bruce Norman Lindner (born 20 June 1961) is a former professional Australian rules footballer who played for the Geelong Football Club and Adelaide Football Club in the Australian Football League (AFL). He is the nephew of legendary North Adelaide footballer Don Lindner.

== SANFL career ==
Blessed with high marking and strong hands, as well as having no trouble kicking the ball 50 metres on the fly even into the wind, Lindner made his league debut for West Adelaide on 16 June 1980 but failed to cement his place in the top side, playing only 4 games and kicking 2 goals for a season mainly spent in the reserves. He went on to win the 1981 SANFL Reserves Magarey Medal, despite only playing 10 reserves games for the year. Following this, Lindner was given his chance by senior coach Neil Kerley and he became a regular in Wests top side in 1982, playing 15 games and kicking 37 goals.

"The President", as Lindner was known, had his best year with The Bloods in 1983. Playing mainly at Half forward but also at times playing Full-forward, Lindner kicked 77 goals for the season and along with regular full-forward Roger Luders (who kicked 105 for the season) and forward player Mike Smith, West Adelaide had the most potent attack in the league, the three kicking over 220 between them. This, combined with their fast and skillful ruck and mid-field plus a tough back line saw The Bloods win 18 of their 22 minor round games to finish minor premiers and easily won their way into the 1983 SANFL Grand Final with a 76-point win over reigning premiers Norwood in the Second Semi-final. Playing at half forward in the Grand Final in front of 47,129 fans at Football Park, Lindner kicked five goals, including a 60-metre goal from the centre square only seconds before the final siren, described by Channel 7 TV commentator Robert Oatey as having "really pile driven this one", as West defeated Sturt 21.16.(142) to 16.12.(108) for their first premiership since the year of Lindner's birth, 1961. In another coincidence, The Bloods coach on that day in 1961 was none other than Lindner's '83 Premiership coach Neil Kerley.

Lindner first represented South Australia during 1983, playing a starring role in the win over Victoria at Football Park after coming into the side as a late replacement for Norwood full forward Neville Roberts. With his first kick he kicked the first goal of the game and SA went on to win by 58 points for their first win over Victoria in Adelaide since 1965. Lindner later played for the Croweaters in their loss to Western Australia at Perth's Subiaco Oval during the 1983 round robin series.

Injury halted Lindner's 1984 season and he was reduced to playing only four games, kicking four goals (compared to 21 games and 77 goals in 1983) as West Adelaide failed to make the finals, finishing sixth with a 10–12 record. Following the 1984 SANFL season, Lindner signed with Geelong in the Victorian Football League (renamed the Australian Football League (AFL) in 1990). He would not play again for West Adelaide until he returned home to play for Adelaide's new AFL team the Adelaide Crows in 1991.

Lindner was dropped by Crows coach Graham Cornes on occasions during 1991 which meant he was back playing for West Adelaide in the SANFL for the first time since 1984 (until 2014 the Adelaide Crows had no reserves team, so players played for their SANFL clubs when not in the AFL team or out injured). This worked out well for Lindner as he played enough games for The Bloods to qualify for West Adelaide's first finals campaign since 1985.

West Adelaide, after a very slow start to their 1991 SANFL season came on strong in the 2nd half of the year winning 9 or their last 10 games to finish in 5th place and qualify for the 1991 SANFL Finals. Despite being a noted goal kicker, he mostly played in the backline in 1991 and was among The Bloods best players as their form continued by defeating defending premiers Port Adelaide 24.12 (156) to 10.7 (67) in the Elimination Final. They then accounted for Woodville-West Torrens in the First Semi-final 15.20 (110) to 8.12 (50) with Lindner again among The Bloods best players. West Adelaide made their way into their first Grand Final since their 1983 premiership when they defeated South Adelaide 18.16 (124) to 15.13 (103) in the Preliminary Final.

In a game which was marred by several all-in brawls, West Adelaide's run of form was halted when they were trounced by North Adelaide 21.22 (146) to 11.7 (73) in front of only 39,276, the smallest SANFL Grand Final crowd since 40,409 attended the 1961 Grand Final between West Adelaide and Norwood.

Lindner played a few games for The Bloods in 1992 when not playing for Adelaide or out injured, but he failed to make an impact as West Adelaide couldn't repeat their 1991 form and failed to make the finals in 1992 despite 1961 and 1983 premiership coach Neil Kerley returning for his 3rd stint with the club.

== VFL/AFL career ==
Bruce Lindner made his debut for Geelong against Hawthorn in Round 1 of the 1985 VFL season. Lindner picked up 18 possessions and kicked one goal in a solid debut in the VFL. He would play every game until Round 6 where he suffered a season-ending injury against St Kilda at Moorabbin Oval.

1986 saw Lindner back to his best as he cemented his place with The Cats, playing in eight of the first nine games of the season and kicking 13 goals before an injury against Hawthorn in Round 9 stopped his season. He made his comeback in Round 21, again against Hawthorn.

Lindner was Geelong's leading goal kicker in 1987 with 62 goals. In 1987 he represented South Australia at interstate football with distinction, earning All-Australian selection. He was All Australian again the following season for his performance in the Adelaide Bicentennial Carnival. Under coach Malcolm Blight, he played 18 games in 1989 and kicked 27 goals, and was Geelong's leading possession player with 25 disposals in the 1989 VFL Grand Final loss to Hawthorn while playing across half back.

Lindner left Geelong after the 1990 season and returned home to South Australia to play for the newly formed Adelaide Football Club. He was a member of their inaugural side which easily defeated Hawthorn at Football Park. The Crows defeated The Hawks by 86 points 24.11 (155) to 9.15 (69). Lindner, playing in his preferred half forward, had 9 kicks and 6 handballs and kicked 4.2 (26) for The Crows in front of 44,902 fans at Football Park. Bruce would go on to play 11 games for Adelaide and kick 15 goals in 1991 season.

Bruce Lindner played only 8 games for Adelaide in 1992 and played with West Adelaide when not selected or injured. He retired in 1993 after sustaining a broken leg in four places in a trail bike accident.
