= 1922 SAFL season =

1922 season of SANFL

1922 SAFL premiership season
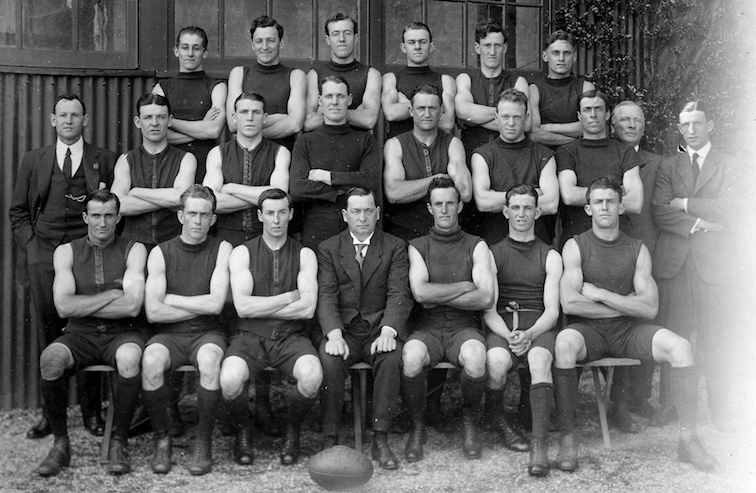
- 42nd SAFL season Pictured above is the 1922 Norwood premiership team.
- Teams: 8
- Premiers: Norwood; 15th premiership
- Minor premiers: Norwood; 5th minor premiership
- Magarey Medallist: Robert Barnes; West Adelaide (8 votes)
- Leading goalkicker: Tom Hart; Norwood (50 goals)
- Matches played: 59
- Highest: 31,000 (Grand Final, Norwood vs. West Adelaide)

The 1922 South Australian Football League season was the 43rd season of the top-level Australian rules football competition in South Australia.

The season was notable for a dramatic finish in a sensational Port Adelaide comeback in the last game was derailed after a goal was disallowed and a protest dismissed by a vote of League delegates. This outcome meant Port Adelaide missed the major round – though only by 1.4 percent – for the first time in over two decades. Port Adelaide was also hit by a long injury list beginning before the opening of the season. Norwood, under the coaching of Tom Leahy, won its first premiership since 1907, completing a rise after a stretch of poor form between 1913 and 1919. Norwood half forward flanker Tom Hart became the first player to kick ten or more goals in a match since J. Tompkins kicked 15 and M. Healey 10 for Port Adelaide in 1903. Hart also became the first to kick fifty goals in a season since "Bos" Daly kicked 54 in 1903.

West Adelaide, aided by having sole use of the Adelaide Oval for training due to North Adelaide moving to their new home at Prospect, took advantage of Port Adelaide's failed protest to contest their first postwar finals series and make the final, which they lost by 33 points despite recording more scoring shots. West Adelaide had won only two of the their first eight games, but after the clearance of "Snowy" Hamilton was finalised they came back powerfully during the second half of the season. South Adelaide were Norwood's main challengers for most of the season, but injuries to key players McKee, Allen, Vickers, Sampson, and Handby caused them to collapse after July.

== Minor round ==
=== Round 1 ===
	Round 1
Saturday, 6 May 1922	West Adelaide 8.8 (56)	def.	Port Adelaide 7.6 (48)	Adelaide Oval
Saturday, 6 May 1922	West Torrens 8.5 (53)	def.	Sturt 4.12 (36)	Thebarton Oval
Saturday, 8 May 1922	South Adelaide 8.12 (60)	def.	Norwood 7.10 (52)	Adelaide Oval
Saturday, 8 May 1922	North Adelaide 12.11 (83)	def.	Glenelg 9.4 (58)	Prospect Oval
Both North Adelaide and West Torrens debuted new home grounds on this round.

=== Round 2 ===
	Round 2
Saturday, 13 May 1922	West Adelaide 8.5 (53)	def. by	North Adelaide 8.15 (63)	Adelaide Oval
Saturday, 13 May 1922	Port Adelaide 7.12 (54)	def. by	West Torrens 9.10 (64)	Alberton Oval
Saturday, 13 May 1922	Glenelg 5.11 (41)	def. by	Norwood 14.11 (95)	Glenelg Oval
Saturday, 13 May 1922	Sturt 13.13 (91)	def.	South Adelaide 7.13 (55)	Unley Oval

=== Round 3 ===
	Round 3
Saturday, 20 May 1922	South Adelaide 16.13 (109)	def.	Glenelg 4.7 (31)	Adelaide Oval
Saturday, 20 May 1922	Norwood 22.13 (145)	def.	North Adelaide 4.5 (29)	Norwood Oval
Saturday, 20 May 1922	West Torrens 7.11 (53)	def.	West Adelaide 5.11 (41)	Thebarton Oval
Saturday, 20 May 1922	Sturt 7.15 (57)	def. by	Port Adelaide 8.15 (63)	Unley Oval
Norwood defeated North Adelaide by 116 points, setting a new record for the club's biggest losing margin which stood until 1973. Tom Hart became the first player to kick ten goals in a game since J. Tompkins and M. Healy kicked 15 and 10 respectively for Port Adelaide against West Adelaide on 22 August 1903.

=== Round 4 ===
	Round 4
Saturday, 27 May 1922	South Adelaide 11.11 (77)	def.	Port Adelaide 5.13 (43)	Adelaide Oval
Saturday, 27 May 1922	Glenelg 6.10 (46)	def. by	West Adelaide 7.18 (60)	Glenelg Oval
Saturday, 27 May 1922	Norwood 13.11 (89)	def.	Sturt 8.9 (57)	Norwood Oval
Saturday, 27 May 1922	North Adelaide 10.4 (64)	def. by	West Torrens 10.11 (71)	Prospect Oval

=== Round 5 ===
	Round 5
Saturday, 3 June 1922	South Adelaide 10.32 (92)	def.	West Adelaide 8.11 (59)	Adelaide Oval
Saturday, 3 June 1922	North Adelaide 7.15 (57)	def. by	Sturt 12.7 (79)	Prospect Oval
Monday, 5 June 1922	Norwood 17.11 (113)	def.	Port Adelaide 4.6 (30)	Adelaide Oval
Monday, 5 June 1922	Glenelg 9.6 (60)	def. by	West Torrens 14.19 (103)	Glenelg Oval
Norwood became the first team to score 100 points in a game against Port Adelaide since South Adelaide in 1899, and only the second ever.

=== Round 6 ===
	Round 6
Saturday, 10 June 1922	South Adelaide 9.12 (66)	def.	North Adelaide 7.11 (53)	Adelaide Oval
Saturday, 10 June 1922	Port Adelaide 17.13 (115)	def.	Glenelg 5.11 (41)	Alberton Oval
Saturday, 10 June 1922	Norwood 18.8 (116)	def.	West Torrens 6.8 (44)	Norwood Oval
Saturday, 10 June 1922	Sturt 10.19 (79)	def.	West Adelaide 8.4 (52)	Unley Oval
Port Adelaide's Maurie Allingham kicked eleven goals against Glenelg.

=== Round 7 ===
	Round 7
Saturday, 24 June 1922	West Adelaide 8.6 (54)	def. by	Norwood 11.17 (83)	Adelaide Oval
Saturday, 24 June 1922	Sturt 20.7 (127)	def.	Glenelg 7.4 (46)	Unley Oval
Monday, 26 June 1922	South Adelaide 8.12 (60)	def. by	West Torrens 10.10 (70)	Adelaide Oval
Monday, 26 June 1922	Port Adelaide 9.11 (65)	def. by	North Adelaide 12.7 (79)	Alberton Oval

=== Round 8 ===
	Round 8
Saturday, 1 July 1922	West Torrens 7.7 (49)	drew with	Sturt 6.13 (49)	Adelaide Oval
Saturday, 1 July 1922	Port Adelaide 11.6 (72)	def.	West Adelaide 7.14 (56)	Alberton Oval
Saturday, 1 July 1922	Glenelg 7.9 (51)	def. by	North Adelaide 12.13 (85)	Glenelg Oval
Saturday, 1 July 1922	Norwood 10.16 (76)	def.	South Adelaide 7.10 (52)	Norwood Oval

=== Round 9 ===
	Round 9
Saturday, 15 July 1922	South Adelaide 18.21 (129)	def.	Sturt 11.6 (72)	Adelaide Oval
Saturday, 15 July 1922	Glenelg 8.15 (63)	def. by	Port Adelaide 10.11 (71)	Glenelg Oval
Saturday, 15 July 1922	North Adelaide 9.10 (64)	def. by	West Adelaide 11.20 (86)	Prospect Oval
	Bye; Norwood, West Torrens

=== Round 10 ===
	Round 10
Saturday, 22 July 1922	West Adelaide 9.11 (65)	def.	West Torrens 8.14 (62)	Adelaide Oval
Saturday, 22 July 1922	Port Adelaide 11.12 (78)	def.	Sturt 9.14 (68)	Alberton Oval
Saturday, 22 July 1922	Glenelg 4.10 (34)	def. by	South Adelaide 12.12 (84)	Glenelg Oval
Saturday, 22 July 1922	North Adelaide 6.9 (45)	def. by	Norwood 9.17 (71)	Prospect Oval

=== Round 11 ===
	Round 11
Saturday, 29 July 1922	Glenelg 5.10 (40)	def. by	Sturt 11.17 (83)	Glenelg Oval
Saturday, 29 July 1922	Norwood 11.15 (81)	def.	West Adelaide 6.12 (48)	Norwood Oval
Saturday, 29 July 1922	North Adelaide 7.11 (53)	def. by	Port Adelaide 11.14 (80)	Prospect Oval
Saturday, 29 July 1922	West Torrens 7.8 (50)	def. by	South Adelaide 9.15 (69)	Thebarton Oval

=== Round 12 ===
	Round 12
Saturday, 5 August 1922	West Adelaide 17.19 (121)	def.	Glenelg 3.9 (27)	Adelaide Oval
Saturday, 5 August 1922	Port Adelaide 10.8 (68)	def.	South Adelaide 5.14 (44)	Alberton Oval
Saturday, 5 August 1922	West Torrens 10.18 (78)	def.	North Adelaide 9.8 (62)	Thebarton Oval
Saturday, 5 August 1922	Sturt 7.9 (51)	def. by	Norwood 11.18 (84)	Unley Oval

=== Round 13 ===
	Round 13
Saturday, 19 August 1922	West Adelaide 8.6 (54)	def.	Sturt 7.10 (52)	Adelaide Oval
Saturday, 19 August 1922	North Adelaide 10.9 (69)	def.	South Adelaide 6.15 (51)	Prospect Oval
Saturday, 19 August 1922	West Torrens 14.7 (91)	def.	Norwood 9.8 (62)	Thebarton Oval
	Bye; Glenelg, Port Adelaide

=== Round 14 ===
	Round 14
Saturday, 2 September 1922	Port Adelaide 9.12 (66)	def. by	Norwood 9.14 (68)	Alberton Oval
Saturday, 2 September 1922	West Torrens 13.24 (102)	def.	Glenelg 6.10 (46)	Thebarton Oval
Saturday, 2 September 1922	Sturt 4.10 (34)	def. by	North Adelaide 12.10 (82)	Unley Oval
	Bye; South Adelaide, West Adelaide

=== Round 15 ===
	Round 15
Saturday, 9 September 1922	South Adelaide 4.11 (35)	def. by	West Adelaide 17.11 (113)	Adelaide Oval
Saturday, 9 September 1922	Norwood 16.23 (119)	def.	Glenelg 7.7 (49)	Norwood Oval
Saturday, 9 September 1922	West Torrens 10.14 (74)	def.	Port Adelaide 9.19 (73)	Thebarton Oval (crowd: 15,000)
	Bye; North Adelaide, Sturt
A sensational finish to the minor round saw Port Adelaide miss the major round for the first time since 1902. Port Adelaide staged a remarkable comeback, kicking 5.8 (38) to nothing in the last quarter to narrow the margin to one point, before an apparent go-ahead goal in the final minute was signalled by the goal umpire, then disallowed by umpire O'Connor due to a late whistle for an interference free kick. A protest by Port Adelaide against the result was dismissed the following Friday by a vote of League delegates, by a margin of 14 to 2.; West Adelaide unexpectedly thrashed third-placed South by thirteen goals to claim fourth on percentage

== Ladder ==
1922 SAFL Ladder
Pos	Team	Pld	W	L	D	PF	PA	PP	Pts
1	Norwood (P)	14	12	2	0	1254	717	63.62	24
2	West Torrens	14	10	3	1	964	857	52.94	21
3	South Adelaide	14	8	6	0	983	881	52.74	16
4	West Adelaide	14	7	7	0	918	857	51.72	14
5	Port Adelaide	14	7	7	0	926	913	50.35	14
6	North Adelaide	14	6	8	0	888	988	47.33	12
7	Sturt	14	5	8	1	935	931	50.11	11
8	Glenelg	14	0	14	0	633	1357	31.81	0

Rules for classification: 1) points; 2) percentage; 3) number of points for.
(P) Premiers

== Major round ==
=== First semi-final ===
1922 SAFL first semi-final
Saturday, 16 September 1922	Norwood	def.	South Adelaide	Adelaide Oval (crowd: 22,000)
4.7 (31); 9.8 (62); 11.10 (76); 13.10 (88)	Q1; Q2; Q3; Final	0.3 (3); 2.4 (16); 7.10 (52); 11.11 (77)	Umpires: Waters
Close 3, Hart 3, Bent 2, Wardham 2, Sibley 2, Hepburn	Goals	Waye 3, Oliver 2, Caust 2, Easton 2, Williams, Barnes
White, Bryant, Sibley, W. Scott, Close, Bent, Dobson, Stephens, Hepburn	Best	Oliver, Vickers, Dan Moriarty, Waye, Caust, J. W. Daly, Kay, Williams, Moss

=== Second semi-final ===
1922 SAFL second semi-final
Saturday, 23 September 1922	West Torrens	def. by	West Adelaide	Adelaide Oval (crowd: 28,000)
3.1 (19); 4.4 (28); 7.6 (48); 11.9 (75)	Q1; Q2; Q3; Final	4.1 (25); 11.4 (70); 15.7 (97); 16.12 (108)	Umpires: O'Connor
Marvel 6, Hollis 4, Karney	Goals	Martin 6, Wright 3, Bailey 2, Cooper 2, Barnes, Hamilton, W. Bishop
Marvel, Mills, Hollis, Green, Marsh, Karney, Wyld, Oaten, Davies	Best	Barnes, Hamilton, Martin, Bailey, Shea, O'Dea, Huxtable, Peters, Jim Bishop, Wright

=== Grand final ===
1922 SAFL final (Note: This is usually referred to as the "grand final", although the minor premier possessed a right to challenge if defeated)
Saturday, 30 September 1922	Norwood	def.	West Adelaide	Adelaide Oval (crowd: 31,000)
2.0 (12); 4.5 (29); 4.6 (30); 9.7 (61)	Q1; Q2; Q3; Final	0.4 (4); 0.8 (8); 2.14 (26); 2.16 (28)	Umpires: Waters
Bent 3, Hepburn 2, Sibley, White, Hart, Close	Goals	Cooper, Martin
Toovey, Bent, White, Dobson, Stephens, Hepburn, Schumacher, Poots, Sibley	Best	Hamilton, Peters, Bailey, Barnes, Huxtable, Shea, Martin
