= 1920 SAFL season =

1920 season of SANFL

1920 SAFL premiership season
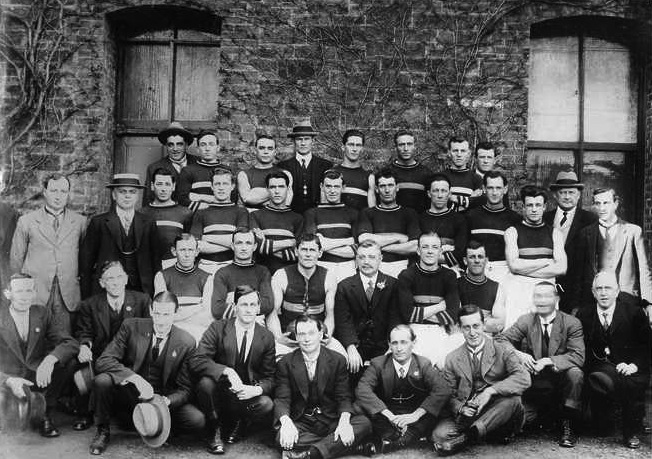
- 40th SAFL season North Adelaide premiership team
- Teams: 7
- Premiers: North Adelaide; 4th premiership
- Minor premiers: North Adelaide; 3rd minor premiership
- Magarey Medallist: Dan Moriarty; South Adelaide; Vic Richardson (Note: Awarded retrospectively and posthumously); Sturt
- Leading goalkicker: Frank Golding; Sturt (30 goals)
- Matches played: 45
- Highest: 42,500 (12 July, North Adelaide vs. Sturt)

The 1920 South Australian Football League season was the 41st season of the top-level Australian rules football competition in South Australia.

The season saw back-to-back defending premiers Sturt affected by massive internal turmoil and debate over strategy that saw basically the same side that won ten of twelve minor round games in 1919 fall to fifth. The Double Blues toured Western Australia between the twelfth and fifteenth rounds, but atrocious weather caused the tour to lose £800.

West Adelaide also had internal trouble and suffered from the retirements of "Golden Years" players Head and Dowling, finishing last for the first time since their winless 1906 season. In contrast, Norwood, who lost their last eleven games in 1919 and were coming off four consecutive wooden spoons, were boosted by the arrival of champion defender "Wacka" Scott and rose from one win to the Final, where they were however decisively beaten by North Adelaide, who benefitted from Norwood losing key forward Hart before the game and top ruckman Packham early in it.

Although minor round attendances remained unquantified, reports suggest that with the recovery from World War I attendances surpassed anything observed before the war.

== Minor Round ==
=== Round 1 ===
	Round 1
Saturday, 1 May 1920	South Adelaide 5.11 (41)	def.	West Adelaide 4.9 (33)	Adelaide Oval
Saturday, 1 May 1920	Norwood 11.12 (78)	def.	Port Adelaide 7.10 (52)	Norwood Oval
Saturday, 1 May 1920	Sturt 7.12 (54)	def.	West Torrens 5.8 (38)	Unley Oval
	Bye; North Adelaide

=== Round 2 ===
	Round 2
Saturday, 8 May 1920	West Adelaide 10.15 (75)	def.	Port Adelaide 8.16 (64)	Adelaide Oval
Monday, 10 May 1920	South Adelaide 6.6 (42)	def.	North Adelaide 4.8 (32)	Adelaide Oval
Monday, 10 May 1920	West Torrens 9.15 (69)	def.	Norwood 4.10 (34)	Hindmarsh Oval
	Bye; Sturt

=== Round 3 ===
	Round 3
Saturday, 15 May 1920	West Adelaide 3.6 (24)	def. by	West Torrens 4.7 (31)	Adelaide Oval
Saturday, 15 May 1920	Port Adelaide 4.5 (29)	def. by	North Adelaide 8.7 (55)	Alberton Oval
Saturday, 15 May 1920	Norwood 2.7 (19)	def. by	Sturt 8.14 (62)	Norwood Oval
	Bye; South Adelaide

=== Round 4 ===
	Round 4
Saturday, 22 May 1920	North Adelaide 6.6 (42)	def. by	West Torrens 8.8 (56)	Adelaide Oval
Saturday, 22 May 1920	Port Adelaide 8.14 (62)	def.	South Adelaide 7.11 (53)	Alberton Oval
Saturday, 22 May 1920	Sturt 10.18 (78)	def.	West Adelaide 9.4 (58)	Unley Oval
	Bye; Norwood

=== Round 5 ===
	Round 5
Saturday, 5 June 1920	South Adelaide 6.12 (48)	def.	West Torrens 5.11 (41)	Adelaide Oval
Saturday, 5 June 1920	Norwood 11.7 (73)	def.	West Adelaide 6.10 (46)	Norwood Oval
Monday, 7 June 1920	North Adelaide 9.12 (66)	def.	Sturt 6.8 (44)	Adelaide Oval
	Bye; Port Adelaide

=== Round 6 ===
	Round 6
Saturday, 12 June 1920	North Adelaide 9.9 (63)	def.	Norwood 2.6 (18)	Adelaide Oval
Saturday, 12 June 1920	West Torrens 10.9 (69)	def. by	Port Adelaide 10.13 (73)	Hindmarsh Oval
Saturday, 12 June 1920	Sturt 13.10 (88)	def.	South Adelaide 3.9 (27)	Unley Oval
	Bye; West Adelaide

=== Round 7 ===
	Round 7
Saturday, 19 June 1920	North Adelaide 10.8 (68)	def.	West Adelaide 2.4 (16)	Adelaide Oval
Saturday, 19 June 1920	Norwood 8.14 (62)	def.	South Adelaide 6.4 (40)	Norwood Oval
Saturday, 19 June 1920	Sturt 8.8 (56)	def. by	Port Adelaide 11.12 (78)	Unley Oval
	Bye; West Torrens

=== Round 8 ===
	Round 8
Saturday, 26 June 1920	West Adelaide 7.10 (52)	drew with	Sturt 7.10 (52)	Adelaide Oval
Monday, 28 June 1920	South Adelaide 7.7 (49)	def. by	Port Adelaide 13.11 (89)	Adelaide Oval
Monday, 28 June 1920	West Torrens 7.9 (51)	def. by	North Adelaide 9.5 (59)	Hindmarsh Oval
	Bye; Norwood

=== Round 9 ===
	Round 9
Saturday, 3 July 1920	Port Adelaide 9.10 (64)	def.	West Adelaide 4.9 (33)	Alberton Oval
Saturday, 3 July 1920	West Torrens 7.14 (56)	def.	Sturt 5.13 (43)	Hindmarsh Oval
Saturday, 3 July 1920	Norwood 3.12 (30)	def. by	North Adelaide 8.10 (58)	Norwood Oval
	Bye; South Adelaide

=== Round 10 ===
	Round 10
Saturday, 10 July 1920	South Adelaide 11.10 (76)	def.	West Adelaide 3.7 (25)	Adelaide Oval
Saturday, 10 July 1920	Port Adelaide 7.13 (55)	def.	Norwood 5.6 (36)	Alberton Oval
Monday, 12 July 1920	North Adelaide 8.16 (64)	def.	Sturt 2.4 (16)	Adelaide Oval
	Bye; West Torrens

=== Round 11 ===
	Round 11
Saturday, 17 July 1920	North Adelaide 5.16 (46)	def.	South Adelaide 5.3 (33)	Adelaide Oval
Saturday, 17 July 1920	West Torrens 16.17 (113)	def.	West Adelaide 8.10 (58)	Hindmarsh Oval
Saturday, 17 July 1920	Sturt 4.13 (37)	def. by	Norwood 4.18 (42)	Unley Oval
	Bye; Port Adelaide

=== Round 12 ===
	Round 12
Saturday, 31 July 1920	West Adelaide 5.6 (36)	def. by	Norwood 8.10 (58)	Adelaide Oval
Saturday, 31 July 1920	Port Adelaide 13.6 (84)	def.	Sturt 5.12 (42)	Alberton Oval
Saturday, 31 July 1920	West Torrens 10.19 (79)	def.	South Adelaide 6.7 (43)	Hindmarsh Oval
	Bye; North Adelaide

=== Round 13 ===
	Round 13
Saturday, 7 August 1920	North Adelaide 6.7 (43)	def. by	West Adelaide 9.10 (64)	Adelaide Oval
Saturday, 7 August 1920	Port Adelaide 8.10 (58)	def.	West Torrens 3.11 (29)	Alberton Oval
	Bye; Norwood, South Adelaide, Sturt

=== Round 14 ===
	Round 14
Saturday, 14 August 1920	North Adelaide 6.11 (47)	def.	Port Adelaide 5.5 (35)	Adelaide Oval
Saturday, 21 August 1920	South Adelaide 10.6 (66)	def.	Norwood 6.6 (42)	Adelaide Oval
	Bye; Sturt, West Adelaide, West Torrens

=== Round 15 ===
	Round 15
Saturday, 28 August 1920	South Adelaide 5.4 (34)	def. by	Sturt 7.12 (54)	Adelaide Oval
Saturday, 28 August 1920	Norwood 12.9 (81)	def.	West Torrens 7.15 (57)	Norwood Oval
	Bye; Port Adelaide, North Adelaide, West Adelaide

== Ladder ==
1920 SAFL Ladder
Pos	Team	Pld	W	L	D	PF	PA	PP	Pts
1	North Adelaide (P)	12	9	3	0	643	434	59.70	18
2	Port Adelaide	12	8	4	0	743	622	54.43	16
3	West Torrens	12	6	6	0	689	617	52.76	12
4	Norwood	12	6	6	0	573	641	47.20	12
5	Sturt	12	5	6	1	626	618	50.32	11
6	South Adelaide	12	5	7	0	552	653	45.81	10
7	West Adelaide	12	2	9	1	520	761	40.59	5

Rules for classification: 1) points; 2) percentage; 3) number of points for.
(P) Premiers

== Major Round ==
=== First Semi-final ===
1920 SAFL First Semi-final
Saturday, 4 September	North Adelaide	def.	West Torrens	Adelaide Oval (crowd: 20,000)
1.3 (9); 1.7 (13); 4.11 (35); 5.14 (44)	Q1; Q2; Q3; Final	1.1 (7); 2.4 (16); 3.7 (25); 3.11 (29)	Umpires: Bumberg
Curnow, Lewis, Haines, O'Brien, Leahy	Goals	Hollis, Manning, Marsh
T. Leahy, Curnow, Frost, Trescowthick, O'Brien, Hamilton, Lewis, Fooks, Fuss	Best	Campbell, Allen, Patten, Johnson, Manning, Richmond, Stone, Kilmartin
Curnow (eye)	Injuries	Manning (concussion)

=== Second Semi-final ===
1920 SAFL First Semi-final
Saturday, 11 September	Port Adelaide	def. by	Norwood	Adelaide Oval (crowd: 20,000)
0.0 (0); 2.3 (15); 4.6 (30); 6.11 (47)	Q1; Q2; Q3; Final	4.5 (29); 6.5 (41); 9.7 (61); 9.9 (63)	Umpires: Bumberg
Dewar 3, Bampton, Allingham, Oliver	Goals	White 2, Townsend 2, Hart 2, Bryant, Schumacher, Gray
Adams, Bampton, Dewar, Howie, Jacobs, Oliver, Congear	Best	B. A. Scott, W. Scott, Packham, Perry, Gray, White, von Einem

=== Final ===
1920 SAFL Final (Note: This is usually referred to as the "Grand Final", although the winner possessed a right to challenge if defeated)
Saturday, 18 September	North Adelaide	def.	Norwood	Adelaide Oval (crowd: 31,000)
1.3 (9); 5.8 (38); 7.12 (54); 9.15 (69)	Q1; Q2; Q3; Final	1.1 (7); 2.1 (13); 3.1 (19); 3.3 (21)	Umpires: Bumberg
Frost 2, Leahy 2, Lewis, Trescowthick, Sprigg, Curnow, Maloney	Goals	Berry, White, Townsend
Leahy, Daviews, Hamilton, Lewis, Maloney, Curnow, Trescowthick, Frost	Best	Perry, White, Grantley, W. Scott, Bryant, Hindes, von Einem
Trescowthick (face)	Injuries	Packham (bruised ribs)
Norwood, minus key forward Hart, are hopeless in attack and never in the match after quarter-time.

== Collingwood Tour Match ==
Collingwood Tour Match
Wednesday, 13 October 1920	North Adelaide	def. by	Collingwood	Jubilee Oval (crowd: 31,000)
5.2 (32); 7.3 (45); 8.6 (54); 9.11 (65)	Q1; Q2; Q3; Final	4.1 (25); 7.7 (49); 10.11 (71); 15.17 (107)	Umpires: Bumberg
O'Brien 3, Haines 2, Frost 2, Maloney, Davies	Goals	Tyson 4, P. Wilson 3, Ludbrooke 3, Wraith, Sheehy, Laxton, Rowe, Lumsden
Hamilton (best on ground), Davies, Curnow, Fooks, Lewis, O'Brien, Frost, Reedman	Best	Rowe, Sheehy, Pannam, McCarthy, Tyson, Twomey, Lumsden, Ludbrooke, Drummond
Arrangements were originally made for North to play the VFL premiers, but eventual premier Richmond could not make the trip as they had booked a trip to Tasmania.
