= 1907 SAFL season =

1907 SAFL premiership season
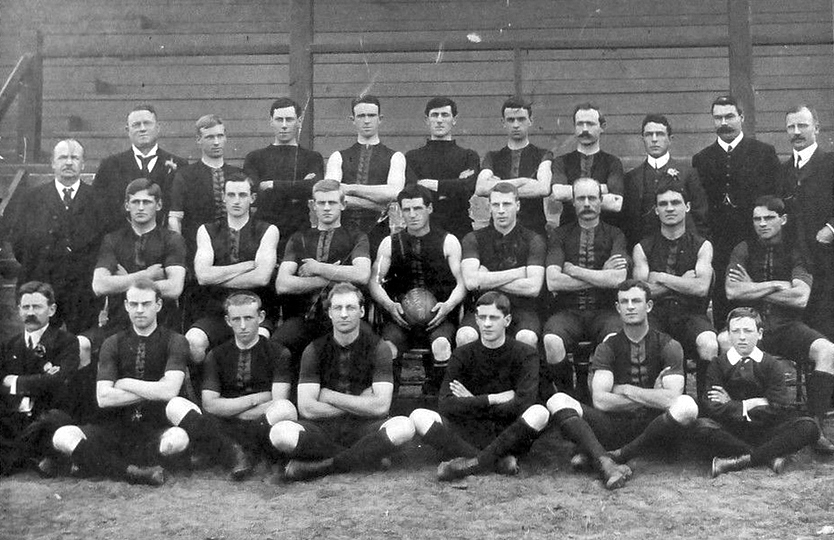
- 31st season Pictured above is the 1907 Norwood premiership team.
- Teams: 7
- Premiers: Norwood; 14th premiership
- Minor premiers: Port Adelaide; 6th minor premiership
- Magarey Medallist: Jack Mack; Port Adelaide
- Leading goalkicker: John Quinn Sr. Port Adelaide (32 goals)
- Matches played: 46
- Highest: 25,000 (Grand Final, Norwood vs. Port Adelaide)

The 1907 South Australian Football League season was the 31st season of the top-level Australian rules football competition in South Australia. On the 25 March 1907 the governing body at the Annual Meeting transitioned its title from an "Association" to a "League".

Norwood won their 14th senior premiership and a second Championship of Australia against Carlton.

== Minor Round ==
=== Round 1 ===
| | Round 1 |
| Saturday, 4 May 1907 | North Adelaide 4.9 (33) | def. by | Norwood 8.5 (53) | Adelaide Oval |
| Saturday, 4 May 1907 | Sturt 5.7 (37) | def. by | Port Adelaide 12.9 (81) | Unley Oval |
| Saturday, 4 May 1907 | West Torrens 4.12 (36) | def. | South Adelaide 3.12 (30) | Hindmarsh Oval |
| | Bye; West Adelaide |

=== Round 2 ===
| | Round 2 |
| Saturday, 11 May 1907 | North Adelaide 10.8 (68) | def. | South Adelaide 4.11 (35) | Adelaide Oval |
| Saturday, 11 May 1907 | Port Adelaide 5.14 (44 | def. | Norwood 4.7 (31) | Alberton Oval |
| Saturday, 11 May 1907 | West Torrens 9.13 (67) | def. | West Adelaide 4.12 (36) | Hindmarsh Oval |
| | Bye; Sturt |

=== Round 3 ===
| | Round 3 |
| Saturday, 18 May 1907 | North Adelaide 6.11 (47) | def. by | Sturt 8.10 (58) | Adelaide Oval |
| Saturday, 18 May 1907 | Port Adelaide 7.12 (54) | def. | West Adelaide 5.5 (35) | Alberton Oval |
| Saturday, 18 May 1907 | Norwood 13.13 (91) | def. | South Adelaide 7.6 (48) | Norwood Oval |
| | Bye; West Torrens |

=== Round 4 ===
| | Round 4 |
| Saturday, 25 May 1907 | North Adelaide 4.13 (37) | def. by | West Adelaide 5.12 (42) | Adelaide Oval |
| Saturday, 25 May 1907 | Norwood 10.18 (78) | def. | Sturt 5.7 (37) | Norwood Oval |
| Saturday, 25 May 1907 | Port Adelaide 9.7 (61) | def. | West Torrens 3.7 (25) | Alberton Oval |
| | Bye; South Adelaide |

=== Round 5 ===
| | Round 5 |
| Saturday, 1 June 1907 | South Adelaide 4.10 (34) | def. by | West Adelaide 6.7 (43) | Adelaide Oval |
| Saturday, 1 June 1907 | Sturt 6.13 (49) | def. | West Torrens 4.4 (28) | Unley Oval |
| Monday, 3 June 1907 | North Adelaide 8.8 (56) | def. | Port Adelaide 6.16 (52) | Adelaide Oval |
| | Bye; Norwood |

=== Round 6 ===
| | Round 6 |
| Saturday, 15 June 1907 | South Adelaide 6.15 (51) | def. | Sturt 4.4 (28) | Adelaide Oval |
| Saturday, 15 June 1907 | West Torrens 9.15 (69) | def. | North Adelaide 6.5 (41) | Hindmarsh Oval |
| Saturday, 15 June 1907 | Norwood 10.21 (81) | def. | West Adelaide 4.8 (32) | Norwood Oval |
| | Bye; Port Adelaide |

=== Round 7 ===
| | Round 7 |
| Saturday, 22 June 1907 | South Adelaide 4.6 (30) | def. by | Port Adelaide 10.18 (78) | Adelaide Oval |
| Saturday, 22 June 1907 | Norwood 11.7 (73) | def. | West Torrens 2.6 (18) | Norwood Oval |
| Saturday, 22 June 1907 | Sturt 6.7 (43) | def. by | West Adelaide 7.7 (49) | Unley Oval |
| | Bye; North Adelaide |

=== Round 8 ===
| | Round 8 |
| Saturday, 29 June 1907 | South Adelaide 5.7 (37) | def. by | West Torrens 4.16 (40) | Adelaide Oval |
| Saturday, 29 June 1907 | Port Adelaide 18.13 (121) | def. | Sturt 3.8 (26) | Alberton Oval |
| Saturday, 29 June 1907 | Norwood 7.9 (51) | def. | North Adelaide 7.6 (48) | Norwood Oval |
| | Bye; West Adelaide |

=== Round 9 ===
| | Round 9 |
| Saturday, 13 July 1907 | North Adelaide 9.11 (65) | def. | West Adelaide 5.9 (39) | Adelaide Oval |
| Saturday, 13 July 1907 | West Torrens 8.1 (49) | def. by | Port Adelaide 12.15 (87) | Hindmarsh Oval |
| Saturday, 13 July 1907 | Sturt 7.14 (56) | def. by | Norwood 9.13 (67) | Unley Oval |
| | Bye; South Adelaide |

=== Round 10 ===
| | Round 10 |
| Saturday, 20 July 1907 | Port Adelaide 6.12 (48) | def. | Norwood 5.4 (34) | Adelaide Oval |
| Saturday, 20 July 1907 | West Torrens 3.6 (24) | def. by | Sturt 6.14 (50) | Hindmarsh Oval |
| Saturday, 20 July 1907 | West Adelaide 7.16 (58) | def. by | South Adelaide 11.16 (82) | Jubilee |
| | Bye; North Adelaide |

=== Round 11 ===
| | Round 11 |
| Saturday, 10 August 1907 | North Adelaide 4.3 (27) | def. by | West Torrens 4.7 (31) | Adelaide Oval |
| Saturday, 10 August 1907 | Port Adelaide 5.6 (36) | def. by | South Adelaide 5.11 (41) | Alberton Oval |
| Saturday, 10 August 1907 | Norwood 5.12 (42) | def. | West Adelaide 3.7 (25) | Norwood Oval |
| | Bye; Sturt |

=== Round 12 ===
| | Round 12 |
| Saturday, 17 August 1907 | Port Adelaide 10.9 (69) | def. | North Adelaide 3.11 (29) | Alberton Oval |
| Saturday, 17 August 1907 | West Torrens 10.14 (74) | def. | West Adelaide 5.10 (40) | Hindmarsh Oval |
| Saturday, 17 August 1907 | Sturt 7.7 (49) | def. by | South Adelaide 6.14 (50) | Unley Oval |
| | Bye; Norwood |

=== Round 13 ===
| | Round 13 |
| Saturday, 24 August 1907 | South Adelaide 8.6 (54) | def. by | North Adelaide 12.10 (82) | Adelaide Oval |
| Saturday, 24 August 1907 | West Torrens 11.10 (76) | def. | Norwood 7.8 (50) | Hindmarsh Oval |
| Saturday, 24 August 1907 | Sturt 4.11 (35) | def. by | West Adelaide 6.6 (42) | Unley Oval |
| | Bye; Port Adelaide |

=== Round 14 ===
| | Round 14 |
| Saturday, 31 August 1907 | South Adelaide 7.9 (51) | def. by | Norwood 7.14 (56) | Adelaide Oval |
| Saturday, 31 August 1907 | Port Adelaide 5.13 (43) | def. | West Adelaide 1.5 (11) | Alberton Oval |
| Saturday, 31 August 1907 | Sturt 4.8 (32) | def. by | North Adelaide 7.22 (64) | Unley Oval |
| | Bye; West Torrens |

== Ladder ==
1907 SAFL Ladder
| Pos | Team | Pld | W | L | D | PF | PA | PP | Pts |
|---|---|---|---|---|---|---|---|---|---|
| 1 | Port Adelaide | 12 | 10 | 2 | 0 | 774 | 404 | 65.70 | 20 |
| 2 | Norwood (P) | 12 | 9 | 3 | 0 | 707 | 516 | 57.81 | 18 |
| 3 | West Torrens | 12 | 7 | 5 | 0 | 537 | 581 | 48.03 | 14 |
| 4 | North Adelaide | 12 | 5 | 7 | 0 | 597 | 585 | 50.51 | 10 |
| 5 | South Adelaide | 12 | 4 | 8 | 0 | 543 | 665 | 44.95 | 8 |
| 6 | West Adelaide | 12 | 4 | 8 | 0 | 452 | 657 | 40.76 | 8 |
| 7 | Sturt | 12 | 3 | 9 | 0 | 500 | 702 | 41.60 | 6 |

Rules for classification: 1) points; 2) percentage; 3) number of points for.
(P) Premiers

== Major Round ==
=== First Semi-Final ===
1907 SAFL First Semi-Final
Monday, 2 September 1907 | Port Adelaide | def. | West Torrens | Adelaide Oval (crowd: 14,500)
5.0 (30); 6.3 (39); 10.7 (67); 12.10 (82) | Q1; Q2; Q3; Final | 0.0 (0); 0.1 (1); 2.1 (13); 2.1 (13)
Quinn 3, Mack 2, Davies 2, Donaghy 2, Strawns, Dickson, Pope | Goals | Thompson, Hill
Mack, Donaghy, Davies, Dickson, Selby, Quinn, Strawns, James, Tompkins | Best | McGavish, Aldersey, Wells, Thompson, Taylor, Waye

=== Second Semi-Final ===
1907 SAFL Second Semi-Final
Saturday, 7 September 1907 | Norwood | def. | North Adelaide | Adelaide Oval (crowd: 12,000)
2.5 (17); 2.9 (21); 3.10 (28); 6.11 (47) | Q1; Q2; Q3; Final | 0.1 (1); 1.1 (7); 3.4 (22); 5.5 (35) | Umpires: Norden
L. Chamberlain 4, Townsend, L. Lewis | Goals | Wenham, Tuckey, Jessop, Daly, Reedman
H. Miller, Townsend, L. Hill, R. Hill, Stoddart, Padman, Gibbons, Barnes | Best | E. Jones, Jessop, McKenzie, Daly, Rees, Earl, Johns, N. Pash

=== Final ===
1907 SAFL Final
Saturday, 14 September 1907 | Port Adelaide | def. by | Norwood | Adelaide Oval (crowd: 20,000)
0.0 (0); 3.1 (19); 4.6 (30); 6.6 (42) | Q1; Q2; Q3; Final | 2.7 (19); 5.7 (37); 7.10 (52); 7.14 (56) | Umpires: Norden
Corston, Pope, Strawns, Mack, Quinn, Dickson | Goals | W. Miller 3, Townsend 2, E. Lewis, L. Lewis
Mack, Pope, Strawns, Quinn, Le Mesurier, Frazer | Best | E. Lewis, L. Lewis, Gibbons, Bahr, Gwynne, Padman, L. Hill, Townsend

=== Challenge Final ===
1907 SAFL Challenge Final
Saturday, 21 September 1907 | Port Adelaide | def. by | Norwood | Adelaide Oval (crowd: 25,000)
2.3 (15); 3.4 (22); 3.5 (23); 3.9 (27) | Q1; Q2; Q3; Final | 1.3 (9); 2.6 (18); 7.7 (49); 8.7 (55) | Umpires: Norden (Note: Norden was replaced by Earle during the third quarter), Earle
Frazer 2, Quinn | Goals | Bahr 2, E. Lewis 2, W.R. Miller 2, Chamberlain, Townsend
Corston, Tompkins, Selby, Pope, Mack, Earle | Best | H. Miller, Bahr, Stoddart, L. Lewis, Chamberlain, Gwynne

During the match field umpire Norden collapsed and had to be replaced during the third quarter by Earle.
