= Broken Hill Football League =

Australian rules football league

AFL Broken Hill
- Formerly: Barrier Ranges Football Association (1890-1928)
- Sport: Australian rules football
- Founded: 1890; 136 years ago
- No. of teams: 4
- Country: Australia
- Confederation: SANFL
- Website: aflbrokenhill.com.au

The AFL Broken Hill (formerly, Broken Hill Football League) is an Australian rules football competition based in the Broken Hill region of New South Wales, Australia which has been running since 1890, and since 1900 with the current four clubs. It is the oldest Australian Football League in the state.

Although located in the state of New South Wales the league is an affiliated member of the South Australian National Football League (SANFL). The Broken Hill Football League is in the Murray Mallee Barrier Zone in the South Australian Country Football Championships.

== Clubs ==
Locations of the Broken Hill FL clubs

=== Current ===
Club	Colours	Nickname	Home Ground	Est.	Years in BHFL	BHFL Senior Premierships	
Club	Colours	Nickname	Home Ground	Est.	Years in BHFL	Total	Years
Central Broken Hill		Magpies	Memorial Oval, Broken Hill	1900	1900-	24	1910, 1912, 1913, 1915, 1935, 1937, 1938, 1940, 1941, 1943, 1971, 1972, 1973, 1979, 1981, 1982, 1983, 1984, 1985, 1993, 1995, 2001, 2006, 2010
North Broken Hill		Bulldogs	Jubilee Oval, Broken Hill	1899	1899-	40	1902, 1904, 1905, 1907, 1908, 1909, 1911, 1914, 1920, 1924, 1934, 1936, 1945, 1946, 1947, 1948, 1950, 1951, 1957, 1959, 1960, 1965, 1975, 1976, 1977, 1986, 1988, 1992, 1994, 1998, 2000, 2004, 2007, 2008, 2011, 2012, 2013, 2016, 2024, 2026
South Broken Hill		Roos	Alma Oval, Broken Hill	1891	1891-1897, 1900-	37	1906, 1919, 1923, 1926, 1928, 1931, 1942, 1944, 1952, 1953, 1956, 1958, 1961, 1967, 1968, 1969, 1970, 1974, 1987, 1989, 1991, 1996, 1997, 1999, 2002, 2003, 2005, 2009, 2014, 2015, 2017, 2018, 2019, 2022, 2023, 2025
West Broken Hill		Robins	Jubilee Oval, Broken Hill	1900	1900-	24	1900, 1901, 1903, 1916, 1917, 1918, 1921, 1922, 1927, 1929, 1930, 1932, 1933, 1939, 1949, 1954, 1955, 1962, 1963, 1964, 1966, 1978, 1980, 1990

There was no premiership awarded in 1925: Central Broken Hill refused to take the field for the second half of the Grand Final against West Broken Hill, claiming that the field umpire was not giving them a fair go.

The 2020 and 2021 seasons were called off due to the COVID-19 pandemic, with three of the four clubs voting in favour of abandoning these seasons.

=== Former Clubs ===
Club	Colours	Nickname	Home Ground	Est.	Years in BHFL	BHFL Senior Premierships		Fate
Club	Colours	Nickname	Home Ground	Est.	Years in BHFL	Total	Years	Fate
Broken Hill				1888	1890-1899	0	-	Disbanded when the teams were redistributed along district lines in 1900
Hotham				1890	1890-1891	0	-	Folded after 1891 season
South Australians			McCulloch Park, Broken Hill	1890	1890-1899	8	1890, 1891, 1892, 1893, 1894, 1896, 1898, 1899	Disbanded when the teams were redistributed along district lines in 1900
Victorians				1890	1890-1897	2	1895, 1897	Merged with South Broken Hill to form Victorians United following 1897 season
Victorians United				1898	1898-1899	0	-	Disbanded when the teams were redistributed along district lines in 1900

== History ==
It might seem curious that Australian rules football should develop as the dominant football code in a mining city in the far west of New South Wales, a state more known for the dominance of rugby league. Broken Hill was established as a mining town and many of the early settlers were from either the Victorian goldfields, or the copper mines of Moonta and Kadina in South Australia, both of which were areas being keen participants in the early development of Australian rules football. This link to states with an Australian rules football culture was further enhanced with the later flow of workers to and from the gold mining Kalgoorlie-Coolgardie axis in Western Australia.

Indeed, the city of Broken Hill to this day conducts itself in many ways as a city aligned to South Australia, using the same time zone (Australian Central Standard Time), being in the (08) Western/central area code, and its local television station, Central GTS/BKN, covers Broken Hill and parts of South Australia.

Football matches were first played in Broken Hill in 1885 and an informal competition was under way by 1888 between Broken Hill, Silverton, and Silver and Blues. The League was formed in 1890 as the Barrier Ranges Football Association (changing to its current name in 1928). Early years of the Association reflected the historical roots of its settlers and the two dominant clubs were known as the 'Victorians' and the 'South Australians'. Other early clubs were Broken Hill, North Broken Hill, South Broken Hill and Hotham.

In 1900 the League followed the trend of many other Leagues around the country at that time, and restructured along district lines. The four clubs that competed in the restructured competition are the same four clubs that make up the current competition, although South Broken Hill was then known as Alma.

The city's close association with South Australia was reflected with many of the League's stars finding success in the South Australian National Football League (SANFL) in the early 20th century. Prominent identities included North Broken Hill's Dave Low, who went on to win the 1912 Magarey Medal with West Torrens Football Club, Jack Woollard, captain of Port Adelaide Football Club's 1910 Championship of Australia-winning team, and Algy Millhouse, who captain-coached Norwood Football Club in 1914. The 1922 Magarey Medallist Robert Barnes and Bruce McGregor, who won Medals in 1926–7, were stars at West Adelaide Football Club. Leading goalkicker, Jack Owens, topped the SANFL's goal kicking ladder on three occasions with Glenelg Football Club in the 1920s and 1930s.

The League itself was considered strong enough to compete with visiting teams from the SANFL, Victorian Football League (VFL) and West Australian Football League (WAFL), and was even invited to send delegates to the inaugural Australasian Football Conference in Melbourne, in November 1905.

In more recent times players from Broken Hill have managed to find their mark with the country's premier league, the Australian Football League (AFL), including Fremantle's Dean Solomon, Brent Staker of West Coast and Brisbane, Taylor Walker of Adelaide, Mitch Clisby of the Melbourne Football Club and Isaac Cumming of the Adelaide Crows.

== Premierships ==
=== List of premiers ===
The complete list of premiers teams is detailed below.

Year	Premiers	Runners Up
1890	South Australians	Broken Hill
1891	South Australians	Victorians
1892	South Australians	Broken Hill
1893	South Australians	Broken Hill
1894	South Australians	Broken Hill
1895	Victorians	South Broken Hill
1896	South Australians	Broken Hill
1897	Victorians	South Australians
1898	South Australians	Broken Hill
1899	South Australians	Victorians
1900	West Broken Hill	North Broken Hill
1901	West Broken Hill	North Broken Hill
1902	North Broken Hill	Central Broken Hill
1903	West Broken Hill	North Broken Hill
1904	North Broken Hill	West Broken Hill
1905	North Broken Hill	West Broken Hill
1906	South Broken Hill	North Broken Hill
1907	North Broken Hill	South Broken Hill
1908	North Broken Hill	South Broken Hill
1909	North Broken Hill	Central Broken Hill
1910	Central Broken Hill	West Broken Hill
1911	North Broken Hill	
1912	Central Broken Hill	
1913	Central Broken Hill	
1914	North Broken Hill	South Broken Hill
1915	Central Broken Hill	North Broken Hill
1916	West Broken Hill	Central Broken Hill
1917	West Broken Hill	South Broken Hill
1918	West Broken Hill	North Broken Hill
1919	South Broken Hill	West Broken Hill
1920	North Broken Hill	South Broken Hill
1921	West Broken Hill	Central Broken Hill
1922	West Broken Hill	North Broken Hill
1923	South Broken Hill	North Broken Hill
1924	North Broken Hill	South Broken Hill
1926	South Broken Hill	West Broken Hill
1927	West Broken Hill	South Broken Hill
1928	South Broken Hill	West Broken Hill
1929	West Broken Hill	South Broken Hill
1930	West Broken Hill	South Broken Hill
1931	South Broken Hill	West Broken Hill
1932	West Broken Hill	North Broken Hill
1933	West Broken Hill	North Broken Hill
1934	North Broken Hill	West Broken Hill
1935	Central Broken Hill	West Broken Hill
1936	North Broken Hill	Central Broken Hill
1937	Central Broken Hill	North Broken Hill
1938	Central Broken Hill	West Broken Hill
1939	West Broken Hill	
1940	Central Broken Hill	South Broken Hill
1941	Central Broken Hill	West Broken Hill
1942	South Broken Hill	North Broken Hill
1943	Central Broken Hill	
1944	South Broken Hill	West Broken Hill
1945	North Broken Hill	South Broken Hill
1946	North Broken Hill	Central Broken Hill
1947	North Broken Hill	West Broken Hill
1948	North Broken Hill	Central Broken Hill
1949	West Broken Hill	North Broken Hill
1950	North Broken Hill	Central Broken Hill
1951	North Broken Hill	South Broken Hill
1952	South Broken Hill	North Broken Hill
1953	South Broken Hill	Central Broken Hill
1954	West Broken Hill	North Broken Hill
1955	West Broken Hill	North Broken Hill
1956	South Broken Hill	North Broken Hill
1957	North Broken Hill	South Broken Hill
1958	South Broken Hill	North Broken Hill
1959	North Broken Hill	West Broken Hill
1960	North Broken Hill	South Broken Hill
1961	South Broken Hill	South Broken Hill
1962	West Broken Hill	
1963	West Broken Hill	Central Broken Hill
1964	West Broken Hill	North Broken Hill
1965	North Broken Hill	South Broken Hill
1966	West Broken Hill	
1967	South Broken Hill	North Broken Hill
1968	South Broken Hill	Central Broken Hill
1969	South Broken Hill	North Broken Hill
1970	South Broken Hill	North Broken Hill
1971	Central Broken Hill	
1972	Central Broken Hill	
1973	Central Broken Hill	South Broken Hill
1974	South Broken Hill	
1975	North Broken Hill	West Broken Hill
1976	North Broken Hill	West Broken Hill
1977	North Broken Hill	West Broken Hill
1978	West Broken Hill	North Broken Hill
1979	Central Broken Hill	
1980	West Broken Hill	
1981	Central Broken Hill	
1982	Central Broken Hill	North Broken Hill
1983	Central Broken Hill	
1984	Central Broken Hill	
1985	Central Broken Hill	North Broken Hill
1986	North Broken Hill	South Broken Hill
1987	South Broken Hill	North Broken Hill
1988	North Broken Hill	South Broken Hill
1989	South Broken Hill	Central Broken Hill
1990	West Broken Hill	South Broken Hill
1991	South Broken Hill	North Broken Hill
1992	North Broken Hill	Central Broken Hill
1993	Central Broken Hill	North Broken Hill
1994	North Broken Hill	South Broken Hill
1995	Central Broken Hill	North Broken Hill
1996	South Broken Hill	North Broken Hill
1997	South Broken Hill	North Broken Hill
1998	North Broken Hill	South Broken Hill
1999	South Broken Hill	Central Broken Hill
2000	North Broken Hill	Central Broken Hill
2001	Central Broken Hill	North Broken Hill
2002	South Broken Hill	North Broken Hill
2003	South Broken Hill	North Broken Hill
2004	North Broken Hill	South Broken Hill
2005	South Broken Hill	Central Broken Hill
2006	Central Broken Hill	South Broken Hill
2007	North Broken Hill	West Broken Hill
2008	North Broken Hill	Central Broken Hill
2009	South Broken Hill	North Broken Hill
2010	Central Broken Hill	South Broken Hill
2011	North Broken Hill	South Broken Hill
2012	North Broken Hill	South Broken Hill
2013	North Broken Hill	South Broken Hill
2014	South Broken Hill	North Broken Hill
2015	South Broken Hill	North Broken Hill
2016	North Broken Hill	South Broken Hill
2017	South Broken Hill	North Broken Hill
2018	South Broken Hill	North Broken Hill
2019	South Broken Hill	North Broken Hill
2022	South Broken Hill	Central Broken Hill
2023	South Broken Hill	West Broken Hill
2024	North Broken Hill	South Broken Hill
2025	South Broken Hill	North Broken Hill
2026	North Broken Hill	South Broken Hill

== Current results ==
The last decade of The Broken Hill Football league has seen the South Broken Hill Football Club show dominance over the rest of the competition, winning Premierships in 2017, 2018 & 2019. Seasons 2020 & 2021 were lost due to COVID-19. South then won season 2022 and 2023. Star Full Forward Cody Schorn became the first player for over 20 years to kick his 100th goal of the season in the 2023 Grand Final.

North were dominant in the early part of the century, winning premierships in 2004, 2007, 2008, 2011, 2012 & 2013 before upsetting hot favourites South to win the 2016 flag. The 2022 and 2023 seasons seen a decline with the Bulldogs missing the two grand finals. Their performance improved during the 2024 season, with returning Coach David Ruddock leading his side to a Grand Final appearance for the first time post COVID. Another masterclass from Ruddock saw the young Bulldogs upset South to win their first flag since 2016. In 2025 North in attempt to defend the premiership, narrowly lost to South by 4pts after North nearly completing a 20+ point comeback. Season 2026 seen another thrilling North and South Grand Final, led by Player-Coach, Nash Mitchells’ Bulldogs trailed for majority of the game eventually outrunning the Roos to become 2026 Premiers by 16pts. Meaning 2 premierships in 3 seasons for the blue and white.

The West Football Club has struggled for success and has not won the Premiership since the 1990 season, the longest premiership drought in the club's history. Despite this their recent seasons have been encouraging, culminating in the club reaching its first A Grade Grand Final for 16 years in 2023. 2024 unfortunately saw West return to the bottom of the ladder, failing to win a game.

Central Football Club have battled with player numbers in recent times despite making the 2022 A Grade Grand Final. A very successful club during the 70s & 80s, Centrals last Premiership was won in 2010. An improved performance in 2024 saw the Pies make the Preliminary Final, going down to North by 35 points.

=== 2011 Ladder ===
Broken Hill FL	Wins	Byes	Losses	Draws	For	Against	%	Pts	Final	Team	G	B	Pts	Team	G	B	Pts
North	15	0	3	0	1874	1037	180.71%	60	Preliminary	South	12	13	85	West	5	11	41
South	10	0	7	1	1622	1300	124.77%	42	Grand	North	9	11	65	South	9	10	64
West	7	0	11	0	1366	1661	82.24%	28									
Central	3	0	14	1	1128	1992	56.63%	14									

=== 2012 Ladder ===
Broken Hill FL	Wins	Byes	Losses	Draws	For	Against	%	Pts	Final	Team	G	B	Pts	Team	G	B	Pts
South	14	0	4	0	1662	1273	130.56%	56	Preliminary	North	16	16	112	West	11	10	76
North	11	0	7	0	1528	1221	125.14%	44	Grand	North	8	9	57	South	8	6	54
West	6	0	12	0	1240	1429	86.77%	24									
Central	5	0	13	0	1152	1659	69.44%	20									

=== 2013 Ladder ===
Broken Hill FL	Wins	Byes	Losses	Draws	For	Against	%	Pts	Final	Team	G	B	Pts	Team	G	B	Pts
North	14	0	4	0	1762	1088	161.95%	56	Preliminary	South	18	9	117	West	9	7	61
South	13	0	5	0	1857	1186	156.58%	52	Grand	North	21	14	140	South	14	14	98
West	7	0	11	0	1170	1669	70.10%	28									
Central	2	0	16	0	1056	1902	55.52%	8									

=== 2014 Ladder ===
Broken Hill FL	Wins	Byes	Losses	Draws	For	Against	%	Pts	Final	Team	G	B	Pts	Team	G	B	Pts
South	16	0	2	0	2278	798	285.46%	64	Preliminary	North	11	11	77	West	5	10	40
North	12	0	6	0	1345	1315	102.28%	48	Grand	South	13	14	92	North	7	7	49
West	6	0	12	0	1066	1834	58.12%	24									
Central	2	0	16	0	958	1700	56.35%	8									

=== 2015 Ladder ===
Broken Hill FL	Wins	Byes	Losses	Draws	For	Against	%	Pts	Final	Team	G	B	Pts	Team	G	B	Pts
South	16	0	1	1	2327	534	435.77%	66	Preliminary	North	16	14	110	Central	1	7	13
North	13	0	4	1	1931	923	209.21%	54	Grand	South	13	9	87	North	6	4	40
Central	4	0	13	0	825	2078	39.70%	16									
West	2	0	16	0	693	2241	30.92%	8									

=== 2016 Ladder ===
Broken Hill FL	Wins	Byes	Losses	Draws	For	Against	%	Pts	Final	Team	G	B	Pts	Team	G	B	Pts
South	17	0	1	0	2345	687	341.34%	68	Preliminary	North	18	11	119	West	7	6	48
North	10	0	8	0	1511	1332	113.44%	40	Grand	North	8	8	56	South	5	11	41
West	6	0	12	0	1011	1719	58.81%	24									
Central	3	0	15	0	781	1910	40.89%	12									

== Women's competition ==
The women's competition started in 2012, making it the oldest rural competition in the state.

=== 2012 Ladder ===
Broken Hill FL	Wins	Byes	Losses	Draws	For	Against	%	Pts	Final	Team	G	B	Pts	Team	G	B	Pts
Central	12	0	0	0	560	41	1365.85%	48	Preliminary	North	7	5	47	West	2	3	15
North	6	0	6	0	257	266	96.62%	24	Grand	Central	8	5	53	North	1	3	9
West	4	0	7	1	180	349	51.58%	18									
South	1	0	10	1	142	483	29.40%	6									

=== 2013 Ladder ===
Broken Hill FL	Wins	Byes	Losses	Draws	For	Against	%	Pts	Final	Team	G	B	Pts	Team	G	B	Pts
Central	13	0	2	0	1034	151	684.77%	52	Preliminary	North	14	5	89	South	0	0	0
North	12	0	3	0	892	184	484.78%	48	Grand	Central	5	4	34	North	2	2	14
South	5	0	10	0	269	708	37.99%	20									
West	0	0	15	0	33	1185	2.78%	0									

=== 2014 Ladder ===
Broken Hill FL	Wins	Byes	Losses	Draws	For	Against	%	Pts	Final	Team	G	B	Pts	Team	G	B	Pts
North	13	0	2	0	927	183	506.56%	52	Preliminary	Central	3	4	22	South	2	3	15
Central	9	0	6	0	599	342	175.15%	36	Grand	Central	5	4	34	North	5	3	33
South	8	0	7	0	579	366	158.20%	32									
West	0	0	15	0	51	1265	4.03%	0									

=== 2015 Ladder ===
Broken Hill FL	Wins	Byes	Losses	Draws	For	Against	%	Pts	Final	Team	G	B	Pts	Team	G	B	Pts
South	10	0	5	0	691	282	245.04%	40	Preliminary	South	7	3	45	North	1	1	7
North	8	0	7	0	528	364	145.05%	32	Grand	Central	4	5	29	South	1	3	9
Central	12	0	3	0	880	144	611.11%	48									
West	0	0	15	0	25	1334	1.87%	0									

=== 2016 Ladder ===
Broken Hill FL	Wins	Byes	Losses	Draws	For	Against	%	Pts	Final	Team	G	B	Pts	Team	G	B	Pts
Central	14	0	1	0	765	146	523.97%	56	Preliminary	South	4	6	30	North	0	3	3
South	11	0	4	0	697	207	336.71%	44	Grand	South	3	2	20	Central	2	1	13
North	5	0	10	0	307	449	68.37%	20									
West	0	0	15	0	101	1068	9.46%	0									

=== Premiers ===
The complete list of premiers teams is detailed below.

Year	Premiers	Runners Up
2012	North Broken Hill	South Broken Hill
2013	North Broken Hill	South Broken Hill
2014	South Broken Hill	North Broken Hill
2015	South Broken Hill	North Broken Hill
2016	North Broken Hill	South Broken Hill
2017	South Broken Hill	North Broken Hill
2018	South Broken Hill	North Broken Hill
2019	South Broken Hill	North Broken Hill
2022	South Broken Hill	Central Broken Hill
2023	South Broken Hill	West Broken Hill

== See also ==
- AFL NSW/ACT
- Australian rules football in New South Wales
- Outback Rugby League

== Books ==
- Encyclopedia of South Australian country football clubs / compiled by Peter Lines. ISBN 9780980447293
- South Australian country football digest / by Peter Lines ISBN 9780987159199
