= 1912 SAFL season =

SANFL season of 1912

1912 premiership season
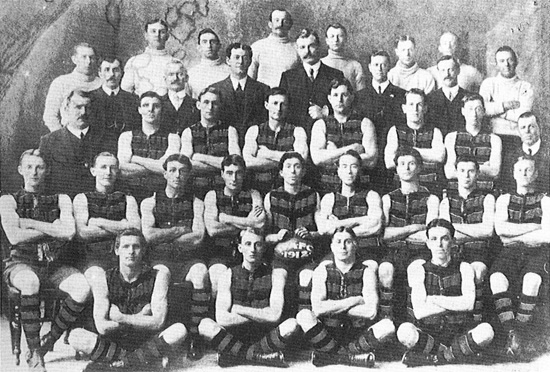
- 36th SAFL season Pictured above is the 1912 SAFL premiers West Adelaide.
- Teams: 7
- Premiers: West Adelaide; 4th premiership
- Minor premiers: Port Adelaide; 9th minor premiership
- Magarey Medallist: Dave Low; West Torrens
- Leading goalkicker: Frank Hansen; Port Adelaide (37 goals)
- Matches played: 46
- Highest: 28,500(Grand Final, West Adelaide vs. Port Adelaide)

The 1912 South Australian Football League season was the 36th season of the top-level Australian rules football competition in South Australia.

Port Adelaide achieved the first documented unbeaten and untied minor round during the season in league history, (Note: Early records in the SAFA are very sketchy, and because behinds did not count towards scoring many matches were drawn.) winning all twelve minor round matches by an approximate average of score of 72 to 35. Port Adelaide failed to finish the season undefeated, as second-placed West Adelaide defeated Port Adelaide in both the final and challenge final to claim their fourth premiership in five seasons. West Adelaide had been hindered by being almost unable to train on rock-hard grounds during a very dry autumn, and had lost four of its first five matches, but afterwards were beaten only once.

West Adelaide did not have the opportunity to defend its Championship of Australia title, since VFL premiers Essendon was unable to make the trip to Adelaide.

Former power club North Adelaide fell to the wooden spoon for the last time until 1978; while South Adelaide, though only finishing fifth of seven, won more games than in the previous three seasons combined.

The desire of the SAFL's clubs to eliminate the weekly bye led to bids by Adelaide University and Gawler to form an eighth club. University was rejected as it had been in 1910, while Gawler withdrew without playing a game. Attendances, although seldom quantified except for the major round, were agreed to have recovered from the decline observed in 1910.

== Minor round ==
=== Round 1 ===
	Round 1
Saturday, 4 May 1912	South Adelaide 8.9 (57)	def. by	Norwood 12.9 (81)	Adelaide Oval
Monday, 6 May 1912	North Adelaide 6.16 (52)	def.	West Adelaide 2.11 (23)	Adelaide Oval
Monday, 6 May 1912	West Torrens 8.11 (59)	def.	Sturt 5.13 (43)	Hindmarsh Oval
	Bye; Port Adelaide

=== Round 2 ===
	Round 2
Saturday, 11 May 1912	Port Adelaide 11.17 (83)	def.	Sturt 4.9 (33)	Adelaide Oval
Saturday, 11 May 1912	West Adelaide 6.15 (51)	def.	South Adelaide 5.6 (36)	Jubilee Oval
Saturday, 11 May 1912	Norwood 10.9 (69)	def.	North Adelaide 8.5 (53)	Norwood Oval
	Bye; West Torrens

=== Round 3 ===
	Round 3
Saturday, 18 May 1912	North Adelaide 5.7 (37)	def. by	Port Adelaide 14.13 (97)	Adelaide Oval
Saturday, 18 May 1912	West Torrens 10.10 (70)	def.	West Adelaide 6.15 (51)	Hindmarsh Oval
Saturday, 18 May 1912	Sturt 7.9 (51)	def.	South Adelaide 6.9 (45)	Unley Oval
	Bye; Norwood

=== Round 4 ===
	Round 4
Saturday, 25 May 1912	West Adelaide 4.7 (31)	def. by	Sturt 6.5 (41)	Adelaide Oval
Saturday, 25 May 1912	West Torrens 10.8 (68)	def.	South Adelaide 6.12 (48)	Hindmarsh Oval
Saturday, 25 May 1912	Norwood 4.9 (33)	def. by	Port Adelaide 10.21 (81)	Norwood Oval
	Bye; North Adelaide

=== Round 5 ===
	Round 5
Saturday, 1 June 1912	South Adelaide 7.10 (52)	def.	North Adelaide 6.7 (43)	Adelaide Oval
Monday, 3 June 1912	West Adelaide 6.6 (42)	def. by	Port Adelaide 10.15 (75)	Adelaide Oval
Monday, 3 June 1912	West Torrens 9.12 (66)	def.	Norwood 8.12 (60)	Hindmarsh Oval
	Bye; Sturt

=== Round 6 ===
	Round 6
Saturday, 8 June 1912	South Adelaide 4.10 (34)	def. by	Port Adelaide 9.9 (63)	Adelaide Oval
Saturday, 8 June 1912	West Torrens 11.15 (81)	def.	North Adelaide 9.11 (65)	Hindmarsh Oval
Saturday, 8 June 1912	Sturt 6.12 (48)	def. by	Norwood 9.3 (57)	Unley Oval
	Bye; West Adelaide

=== Round 7 ===
	Round 7
Saturday, 15 June 1912	North Adelaide 6.12 (48)	def.	Sturt 3.9 (27)	Adelaide Oval
Saturday, 15 June 1912	Port Adelaide 11.5 (71)	def.	West Torrens 4.3 (27)	Alberton Oval
Saturday, 15 June 1912	Norwood 4.11 (35)	def. by	West Adelaide 7.16 (58)	Norwood Oval
	Bye; South Adelaide

=== Round 8 ===
	Round 8
Saturday, 22 June 1912	West Adelaide 7.10 (52)	def.	West Torrens 5.8 (38)	Adelaide Oval
Monday, 24 June 1912	South Adelaide 8.12 (60)	def.	North Adelaide 4.9 (33)	Adelaide Oval
Monday, 24 June 1912	Port Adelaide 12.13 (85)	def.	Sturt 5.10 (40)	Alberton Oval
	Bye; Norwood

=== Round 9 ===
	Round 9
Saturday, 29 June 1912	South Adelaide 7.8 (50)	def. by	West Adelaide 8.14 (62)	Adelaide Oval
Saturday, 29 June 1912	Port Adelaide 8.7 (55)	def.	Norwood 5.10 (40)	Alberton Oval
Saturday, 29 June 1912	Sturt 5.18 (48)	def.	West Torrens 2.7 (19)	Unley Oval
	Bye; North Adelaide

=== Round 10 ===
	Round 10
Saturday, 13 July 1912	South Adelaide 6.10 (46)	def.	Sturt 3.8 (26)	Adelaide Oval
Saturday, 13 July 1912	West Adelaide 10.17 (77)	def.	North Adelaide 6.7 (43)	Jubilee Oval
Saturday, 13 July 1912	Norwood 8.7 (55)	def. by	West Torrens 13.6 (84)	Norwood Oval
	Bye; Port Adelaide

=== Round 11 ===
	Round 11
Saturday, 27 July 1912	West Adelaide 10.10 (70)	def.	Norwood 2.8 (20)	Adelaide Oval
Saturday, 27 July 1912	Port Adelaide 6.10 (46)	def.	South Adelaide 4.6 (30)	Alberton Oval
Saturday, 27 July 1912	Sturt 5.8 (38)	def.	North Adelaide 2.11 (23)	Unley Oval
	Bye; West Torrens

=== Round 12 ===
	Round 12
Saturday, 3 August 1912	North Adelaide 5.10 (40)	def. by	West Torrens 6.6 (42)	Adelaide Oval
Saturday, 3 August 1912	Port Adelaide 11.2 (68)	def.	West Adelaide 6.9 (45)	Alberton Oval
Saturday, 3 August 1912	Norwood 10.8 (68)	def.	South Adelaide 7.13 (55)	Norwood Oval
	Bye; Sturt

=== Round 13 ===
	Round 13
Saturday, 17 August 1912	South Adelaide 6.4 (40)	def.	West Torrens 2.9 (21)	Adelaide Oval
Saturday, 17 August 1912	Port Adelaide 8.11 (59)	def.	North Adelaide 3.8 (26)	Alberton Oval
Saturday, 17 August 1912	Norwood 1.17 (23)	def. by	Sturt 6.7 (43)	Norwood Oval
	Bye; West Adelaide

=== Round 14 ===
	Round 14
Saturday, 24 August 1912	North Adelaide 14.8 (92)	def.	Norwood 9.12 (66)	Adelaide Oval
Saturday, 24 August 1912	West Torrens 5.6 (36)	def. by	Port Adelaide 11.19 (85)	Hindmarsh Oval
Saturday, 24 August 1912	Sturt 6.8 (44)	def. by	West Adelaide 10.10 (70)	Unley Oval
	Bye; South Adelaide

== Ladder ==
1912 SAFL Ladder
Pos	Team	Pld	W	L	D	PF	PA	PP	Pts
1	Port Adelaide	12	12	0	0	868	423	67.23	24
2	West Adelaide (P)	12	7	5	0	632	572	52.49	14
3	West Torrens	12	7	5	0	611	658	48.15	14
4	Sturt	12	5	7	0	482	589	45.00	10
5	South Adelaide	12	4	8	0	553	613	47.43	8
6	Norwood	12	4	8	0	607	762	44.34	8
7	North Adelaide	12	3	9	0	555	691	44.54	6

Rules for classification: 1) points; 2) percentage; 3) number of points for.
(P) Premiers

== Major round ==
=== First semi-final ===
1912 SAFL first semi-final
Saturday, 7 September	Port Adelaide	def.	West Torrens	Adelaide Oval (crowd: 12,000)
3.5 (23); 5.9 (39); 7.15 (57); 9.16 (70)	Q1; Q2; Q3; Final	1.2 (8); 2.3 (15); 2.3 (15); 4.5 (29)	Umpires: Coleman
McFarlane, Mahory, Magor, Hansen, Hosking, Oliver, O'Grady, Ashley, Callinan	Goals	Renfrey, Potter, Gluyas, Smith
Ashley, O'Grady, Mahony, Eaton, Robertson, Rose, Dempster, Oliver, Hosking	Best	Hutton, Johnson, Courtney, Fooks, Phillips, Taylor, Huxtable, Gluyas

=== Second semi-final ===
1912 SAFL second semi-final
Saturday, 14 September	West Adelaide	def.	Sturt	Adelaide Oval (crowd: 8,000)
1.4 (10); 3.5 (23); 5.6 (36); 8.7 (55)	Q1; Q2; Q3; Final	1.1 (7); 1.4 (10); 1.5 (11); 3.6 (24)	Umpires: Carter
Beck 2, Oakley 2, Alec Conlin, Head, Slattery, Hele	Goals	Bauldenstone, Renfrey, Noal
Arthur Conlin (best on ground), a'Court, Head, Dowling, Baker, Moore, Oakley, Slattery, Keegan, Dwyer	Best	Bannigan, Heinrichs, Kirchner, McDougall, Hewett, Sharp, Noal, Golding, Renfrey, Smith, Curnow

=== Final ===
1912 SAFL final
Saturday, 21 September	Port Adelaide	def. by	West Adelaide	Adelaide Oval (crowd: 28,000)
3.2 (20); 5.6 (36); 5.6 (36); 6.10 (46)	Q1; Q2; Q3; Final	1.0 (6); 2.2 (14); 9.6 (60); 9.9 (63)	Umpires: Carter
Magor 3, Congear, O'Grady, Hansen	Goals	Dailey 4, Dowling 2, Alec Conlin, Beck, Oakley
Oliver, Magor, Hosking, Mahoney, Callinan, McFarlane, Dickson, Bose, Sexton, O'Grady	Best	J. J. McCarthy, Head, Keegan, Oakley, Dailey, Dowling, Baker, Pierce, A'Court
Ashley (broken jaw); Dickson (shoulder)	Injuries
A brilliant third quarter burst against a Port Adelaide team reduced to seventeen men during the first quarter spoiled Port Adelaide's attempt at a perfect season.

=== Grand final ===
1912 SAFL Grand Final
Saturday, 28 September	Port Adelaide	def. by	West Adelaide	Adelaide Oval (crowd: 28,500)
2.1 (13); 2.1 (13); 4.2 (26); 5.2 (32)	Q1; Q2; Q3; Final	0.1 (1); 3.2 (20); 5.4 (34); 6.10 (46)	Umpires: Carter
Oliver 2, Congear, McFarlane, Hosking	Goals	Moore 2, Keegan, Beck, Slattery, Alec Conlin
Oliver, Robertson, Callinan, Mahoney, O'Grady, Anderson, Magor, Pope	Best	Head (best on ground), Arthur Conlin, Alec Conlin, J. J. McCarthy, Oakley, Dowling, Baker, Slattery
