= 1953 SANFL season =

- Teams: 8
- Premiers: West Torrens; 4th premiership
- Minor premiers: Port Adelaide; 23rd minor premiership
- Magarey Medallist: Jim Deane; South Adelaide (26 votes)
- Ken Farmer Medallist: Max Mayo; Norwood (78 Goals)

Attendance
- Matches played: 76
- Total attendance: 738,703 (9,720 per match)
- Highest: 42,949 (Grand Final, West Torrens vs. Port Adelaide)

The 1953 South Australian National Football League season was the 74th season of the top-level Australian rules football competition in South Australia.

== Ladder ==
1953 SANFL Ladder
Pos	Team	Pld	W	L	D	PF	PA	PP	Pts
1	Port Adelaide	18	15	3	0	1669	1161	58.98	30
2	West Torrens (P)	18	15	3	0	1822	1305	58.27	30
3	Norwood	18	10	8	0	1609	1497	51.80	20
4	Glenelg	18	9	9	0	1701	1552	52.29	18
5	North Adelaide	18	8	10	0	1465	1518	49.11	16
6	West Adelaide	18	5	13	0	1372	1546	47.02	10
7	Sturt	18	5	13	0	1505	1885	44.40	10
8	South Adelaide	18	5	13	0	1170	1849	38.75	10

Rules for classification: 1) points; 2) percentage; 3) number of points for.
(P) Premiers

== Finals Series ==
=== Grand Final ===
1953 SANFL Grand Final
Sunday 6 October (2:10 pm)	West Torrens	def.	Port Adelaide	Adelaide Oval (crowd: 42,949)
3.3 (21); 6.8 (44); 7.10 (52); 9.13 (67)	Q1; Q2; Q3; Final	4.3 (27); 6.7 (43); 8.10 (58); 8.12 (60)	Jack Oatey Medallist:
Bradford, L. Head, Willis 2 Cockshell, R.Hank, Pyatt 1	Goals	2 W. Dittmar, G. Motley, F. Williams; 1 Hayes, Jaggard
Clingly, Cockshell, Coverlid, Prior, Pyatt, Bradford, L. Head	Best	Clift, G. Motley, Parham, Russell, Jaggard, Boyd
