= 1923 SAAFL season =

1923 premiership season
- Date: 5 May - 8 September
- Teams: 7
- Premiers: Semaphore Central
- Runners-up: University
- Minor premiers: Semaphore Central
- Wooden spooners: Kingswood
- Best and fairest: Don Clarke (v.c. of Semaphore Central
- Leading goalkicker: White (Dulwich) 43

The 1923 SAAFL season was the 9th season of the South Australian Amateur Football League (SAAFL).

The 1923 season commenced on 5 May and concluded on 8 September.

Henley and Grange ended its first of three stints in the Amateur league in 1922 when it was unable to field a team. Its place was taken by the Teachers Training College, playing at Hindmarsh and Kensington Ovals.

During the minor round, Teachers defeated University 12.8 to 9.15 at Hindmarsh Oval as a curtain raisers to the West Torrens v Sturt S.A.F.L. game.

== Ladder ==
Pos	Team	Pld	W	L	D	Pts
1	Semaphore Central	12	12	0	0	24
2	University	12	9	3	0	18
3	Teachers Training College	12	8	4	0	16
4	Dulwich	12	4	8	0	8
5	Goodwood	12	3	9	0	6
6	Y.M.C.A.	12	3	9	0	6
7	Kingswood	12	3	9	0	6

== Finals ==
=== Semi Finals ===
	Semi-finals
Saturday, 8 September	Semaphore Central 17.16	def.	Teachers Training College 4.7
Saturday, 1 September	University 12.12	def.	Dulwich 4.10	Thebarton Oval

=== Final ===
	Final
Saturday, 15 September	Semaphore Central 6.10	def.	University 5.5	Norwood Oval

== Representative ==
An Inter-Association match was played at Tanunda Oval against the Barossa and Light Association on the 4th June.

	Inter-Association
Monday, 4 June	Barossa & Light Association 8.8	def. by	S.A. Amateur League 12.12	Tanunda Oval
