= Phil Sandland =

Australian rules footballer (1882–1970)

Personal information
- Full name: Philip Thomas Sandland
- Born: 15 December 1882; Burra, South Australia
- Died: 13 July 1970 (aged 87); Moora, Western Australia

Playing career^{1}
Years	Club	Games (Goals)
1901–1903	North Adelaide	17 (11 goals)
- ^{1} Playing statistics correct to the end of 1903.

Philip Thomas Sandland (15 December 1882 – 13 July 1970) was an Australian rules footballer who played with North Adelaide in the South Australian Football Association (SAFA).

Sandland first came to notice as a footballer of some skill when he was a boarder at Saint Peter's College where he first represented the school's First XVIII in 1897 at the young age of 14 years and 6 months. He went on to play for the school's First XVIII in 1899 and 1900.

He joined North Adelaide Football Club in 1901 and debuted in the opening match of that season against West Torrens Football Club on the Adelaide Oval. Four matches later he represented the South Australian state side against Victoria. He went on to play 14 out of a possible 15 matches for North Adelaide in 1901.

Such was his form he was awarded the Magarey Medal. The award being in its infancy was nowhere as well known as it later became and upon being informed of his win Sandland knew nothing of it. According to Sandland, two days after the award had been decided at a League meeting Sandland "was standing on the Beehive corner and Alf Grayson (Norwood Football Club player and official), came up and congratulated him. 'What for?' he asked. 'You have won the Magarey Medal.' That was the first he had heard of it. Some weeks afterwards Phil was asked to attend a meeting of the North Adelaide Football Club committee at the Commercial Hotel in Tynte street when without any further palaver the medal was handed over."

After spending 1901 studying at the School of Mines Sandland returned to the family farm at Burra, South Australia in 1902, all but effectively ending his league football career. He returned to play one match in North's winning Grand Final side against the South Adelaide Football Club. He'd lost none of his style and was named in North's best on the day.

In 1903 he ventured down to Adelaide for the Public Holiday game against South Adelaide (June 8) and featured high in North's best in a winning side. He stayed on for the Saturday game as it was John Reedman's testimonial and again featured high in North's best as North kept Norwood goalless in the last quarter to give their popular skipper a win. That was to be his final match for North Adelaide.

He kept up with sport in his home town and became very well known for his cricket as well as his football prowess. He ended up moving to Western Australia in 1908, living in Moora where he continued playing football into the next decade.

When the South Australian state team visited Western Australia in 1939 Sandland greeted the team on their arrival and sort out Port Adelaide's champion Bob Quinn congratulating him on winning the previous season's Magarey Medal. He also showed Quinn his medal which he still proudly wore on his watch chain. He kept up an interest in the club's fortunes from afar and sent a telegram of good luck to the team for the 1949 Grand Final.

In 1968 Sandland was invited back to the North Adelaide Football Club as a very special guest for their Magarey Medal dinner. As it turned out Barrie Robran won the first of his three Magarey Medals that year, so the oldest living Magarey Medalist got to be with the newest. It was to be Sandland's last journey to his home state, and he died on 13 July 1970 at Moora in Western Australia.
