= Bob Hank =

Australian rules footballer and coach

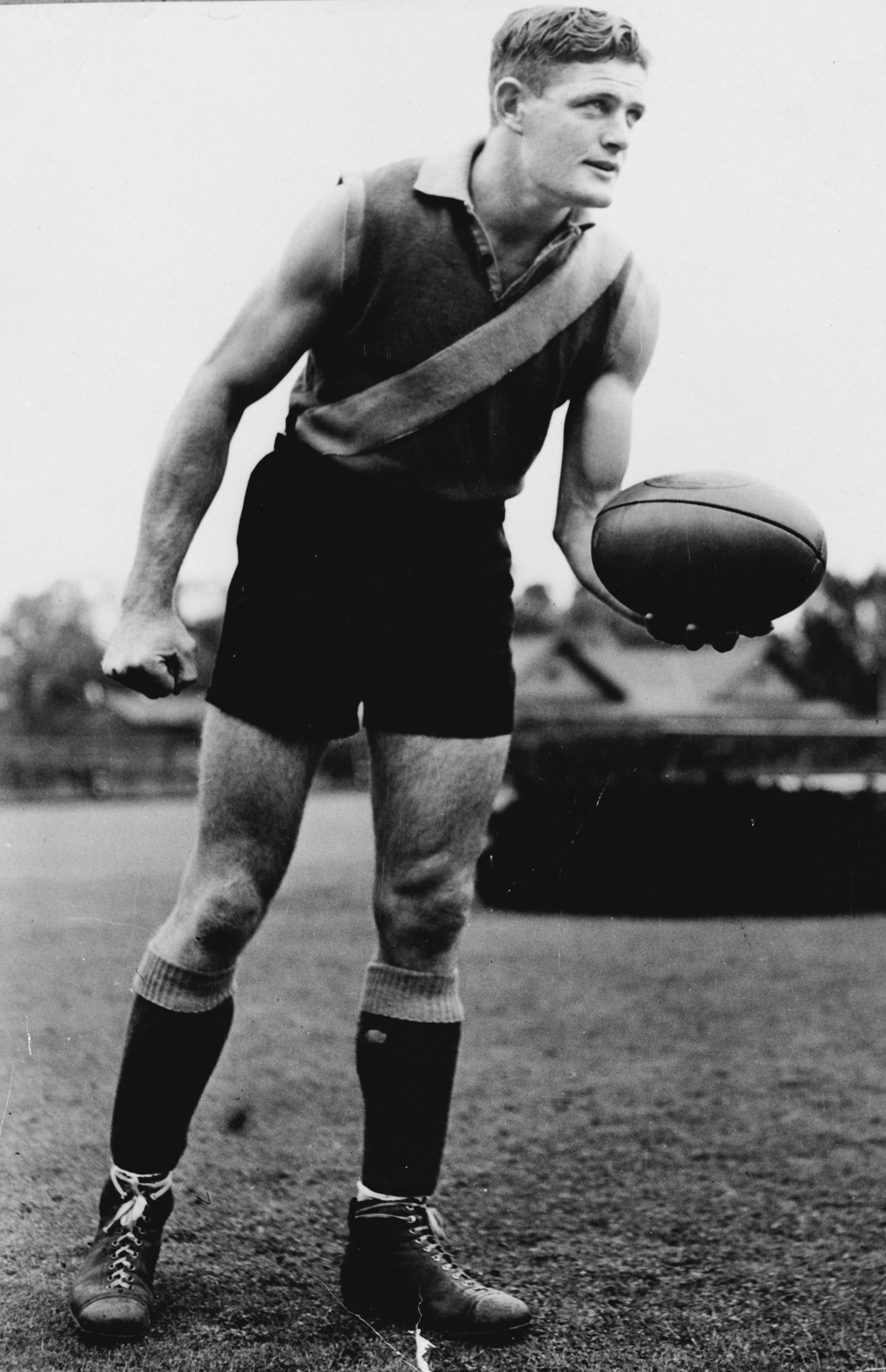
- Robert 'Bob' Hank, Australian rules footballer, April 1950.

Personal information
- Full name: Robert William Hank
- Nickname: The Master
- Born: 19 June 1923; Mile End, South Australia
- Died: 14 June 2012 (aged 88)
- Positions: Centre, half-forward

Playing career^{1}
Years	Club	Games (Goals)
1944–1958	West Torrens	224 (61)

Coaching career
Years	Club	Games (W–L–D)
1951	West Torrens	19 (10–9–0)
- ^{1} Playing statistics correct to the end of 1958.

Career highlights
- West Torrens premiership player 1945, 1953; West Torrens best and fairest 1945–50, 1952–53, 1957; Magarey Medallist 1946, 1947; West Torrens club captain 1947–55; West Torrens captain-coach 1951; 27 state games for South Australia (captain 1951–54); All-Australian 1953; West Torrens life member 1953; Australian Football Hall of Fame inductee 1999; South Australian Football Hall of Fame inaugural inductee 2002; Woodville-West Torrens life member; Woodville-West Torrens life governor

Robert William "Bob" Hank (19 June 1923 – 14 June 2012) grew up in and lived in Lockleys and was an Australian rules footballer who played for West Torrens in the South Australian National Football League (SANFL).

== Career ==
Hank began his senior playing career with the wartime combination of West Torrens–Port Adelaide in 1944. He then moved to West Torrens the next year when the official SANFL competition resumed, featuring prominently in the centre in Torrens' winning Grand Final side that triumphed that year over their former wartime partners Port Adelaide.

Hank's brilliant start to his career continued in 1946 with the first of back-to-back Magarey Medals – the SANFL's highest individual award for the "fairest and most brilliant" player.

In 1946 he was also selected for the first of 27 state games for South Australia. He went on to captain the state side between 1951 and 1954 and earned selection in the inaugural All-Australian team for his performances during the 1953 Adelaide Carnival.

Throughout his career Hank was known for his ball handling and his distinctive left foot drop-kicks. Hank played in the centre or across half-forward. In his latter years he played despite serious injuries and when finally retired in 1958 he had played a total of 224 games.

In total Hank won the West Torrens' best and fairest award nine times (six in a row between 1945 and 1950). He captained his club for nine seasons and was captain-coach in 1951 and he was a member of West Torrens' last ever premiership team in 1953.

Hank's brothers Bill and Ray Hank also played for West Torrens, as did Hank's son Barry.

Bob also clean bowled Sir Donald Bradman in a district cricket final at Adelaide Oval March 1947 whilst Bob was playing for the West Torrens Cricket Club and Bradman was playing for the Kensington Cricket Club.

== Accolades ==
Bob Hank was awarded life membership of the West Torrens Football Club for his services to the club while still a player in 1953. His life membership was carried over to the Woodville-West Torrens Football Club when West Torrens merged with the Woodville Football Club in 1991.

Hank was inducted into the Australian Football Hall of Fame in 1999 in recognition of his superb playing skills and achievements. In 2002 he was one of 113 inaugural inductees into the South Australian Football Hall of Fame.

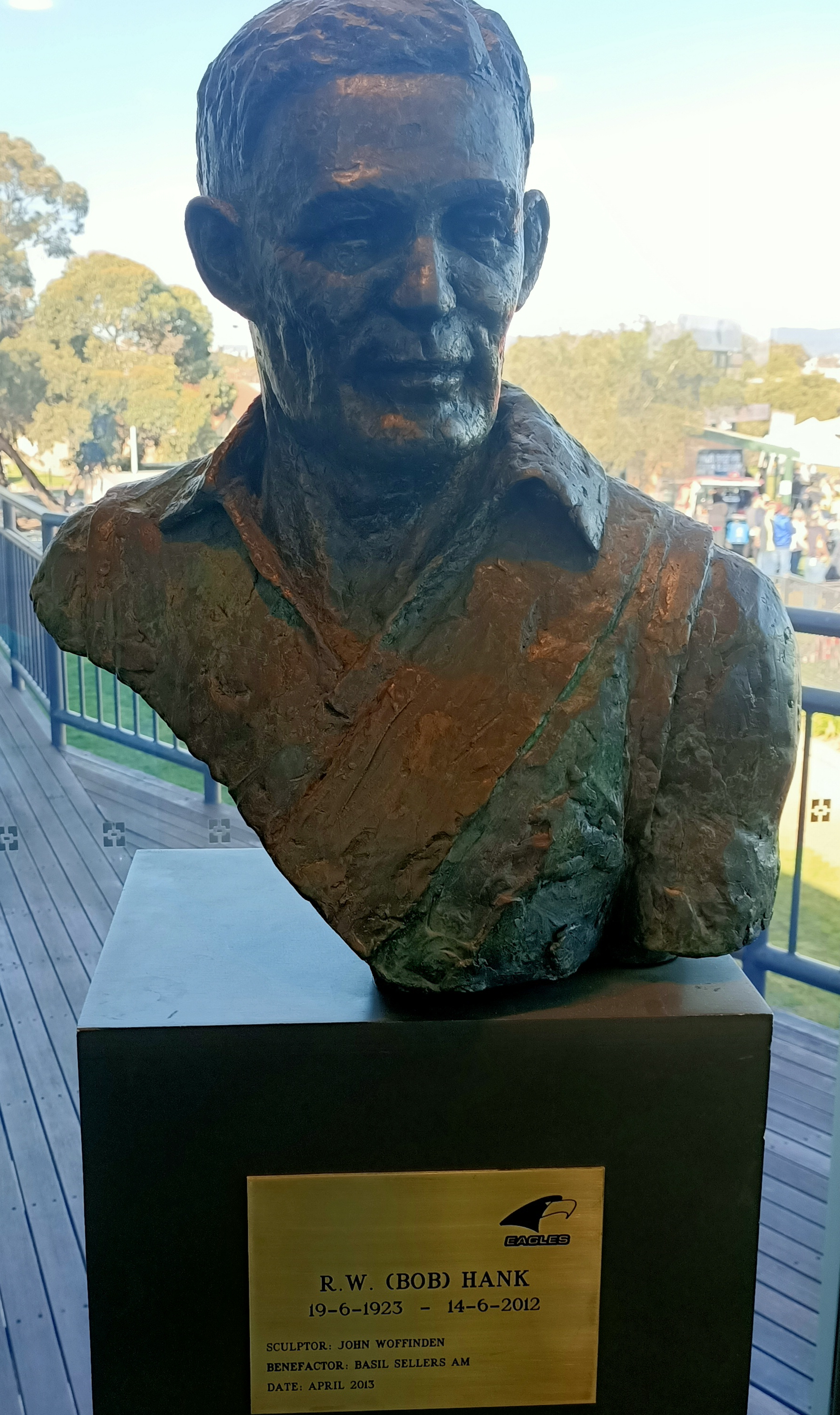
Bronze Sculpture of Bob Hank resides at the Woodville West Torrens Football Club.

Bob Hank was one of six life governors of Woodville-West Torrens along with Lindsay Head, Andrew Rogers, Malcolm Blight, Andrew Payze and Fred Bills. Hank was also the Eagles' number 1 ticket holder.

Bob Hank would become the Captain of the Grange Golf Club in 1987 (The Club that would later be home to the first annual LIVGolf tournament in Australia)

On July 15, 2000, Bob was Olympic torch bearer as it passed through Adelaide.

== Death ==
Hank suffered from an inoperable abdominal aortic aneurysm and died when it burst around 1 a.m. local time at his home on 14 June 2012.
