= 1933 SANFL season =

Football season in Southern Australia

- Teams: 8
- Premiers: West Torrens; 2nd premiership
- Minor premiers: Sturt; 4th minor premiership
- Magarey Medallist: Keith Dunn; Sturt
- Ken Farmer Medallist: Ken Farmer; North Adelaide (112 Goals)
- Matches played: 73
- Highest: 33,444 (Grand Final, West Torrens vs. Norwood)

The 1933 South Australian National Football League season was the 54th season of the top-level Australian rules football competition in South Australia.

== Ladder ==
1933 SANFL Ladder
Pos	Team	Pld	W	L	D	PF	PA	PP	Pts
1	Sturt	17	13	4	0	1692	1332	55.95	26
2	West Torrens (P)	17	12	5	0	1564	1490	51.21	24
3	North Adelaide	17	11	6	0	1717	1536	52.78	22
4	Norwood	17	10	6	1	1697	1513	52.87	21
5	Port Adelaide	17	9	7	1	1586	1519	51.08	19
6	Glenelg	17	9	8	0	1795	1710	51.21	18
7	South Adelaide	17	3	14	0	1485	2002	42.59	6
8	West Adelaide	17	0	17	0	1419	1853	43.37	0

Rules for classification: 1) points; 2) percentage; 3) number of points for.
(P) Premiers

== Finals series ==
=== Grand Final ===
1933 SANFL Grand Final
Saturday, 14 October	West Torrens	def.	Norwood	Adelaide Oval (crowd: 33,444)
3.2 (20); 8.3 (51); 9.5 (59); 13.10 (88)	Q1; Q2; Q3; Final	4.5 (29); 6.5 (41); 8.8 (56); 9.11 (65)
