= Max Pontifex =

Australian rules footballer

Personal information
- Full name: Stanley Maxwell Pontifex
- Born: 31 July 1910; North Adelaide, South Australia
- Died: 18 January 1998 (aged 87)
- Original team: Commonwealth Bank (SA)

Playing career^{1}
Years	Club	Games (Goals)
1930–1934	West Torrens	74 (50)
1936–1938	City (Launceston)	45 (?)
- ^{1} Playing statistics correct to the end of 1934.

Stanley Maxwell Pontifex was an Australian rules footballer who played with West Torrens in the South Australian National Football League (SANFL).

Pontifex's career with West Torrens began in 1929 and ended when he was transferred by his employer to Tasmania, where he captain/coached City Football Club in the Northern Tasmanian Football Association (NTFA). A centreman, he had won a Magarey Medal in 1932 and was twice West Torrens' best and fairest winner. He also represented South Australia in 10 interstate matches during his career.

He is buried at St Jude's Cemetery, Brighton along with his wife Verna Margaret née Smith (1914–2001).
