= Robert Barnes (Australian footballer) =

Australian rules footballer

Robert "Bobbie" G L Barnes

Personal information
- Full name: Robert Barnes
- Born: 4 February 1896; Mount Barker
- Died: 27 September 1967 (aged 71)
- Original team: West Broken Hill

Playing career^{1}
Years	Club	Games (Goals)
1921–1926	West Adelaide	59 (67)
- ^{1} Playing statistics correct to the end of 1924.

Robert Barnes (4 February 1896 – 27 September 1967) was an Australian rules footballer who played for West Adelaide in the South Australian National Football League (SANFL).

Born in Mount Barker in regional South Australia, Barnes played his early football for West Broken Hill Football Club in the Barrier Ranges Football Association in far west New South Wales, winning the Kenwrick Medal for Best and Fairest player in the competition. A rover, he was recruited by West Adelaide of the 1921 season and represented the South Australian interstate team that year for the first of eight times. In a 1921 match against North Adelaide Football Club, Barnes kicked a goal from seventy metres out after the final siren to draw the match. West Adelaide supporters carried Barnes shoulder high from the ground.

In 1922 Barnes won the Magarey Medal for the Best and Fairest player in the league and played in West Adelaide's losing Grand Final team. West had finished the minor round in 4th place with a 7–7 record. They defeated West Torrens in the 2nd Semi-final but were defeated 9.7 (61) to 2.16 (28) by Norwood in the Grand Final at the Adelaide Oval. Barnes topped West Adelaide's goal kicking with 17 in 1924.

Robert Barnes finished with 59 games and 67 goals for West Adelaide.

In 1927, Barnes was appointed as captain / coach of the Albury Football Club in the Ovens and Murray Football League.

== Sources ==
- Atkinson, G. (1982) Everything you ever wanted to know about Australian rules football but couldn't be bothered asking, The Five Mile Press: Melbourne. ISBN 0 86788 009 0.
