= Charlie Adams (Australian footballer) =

Australian rules footballer

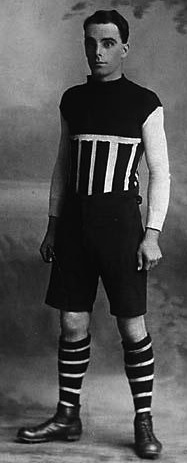
- Charles Adams

Personal information
- Full name: Charles Edwin George Adams
- Nickname: Charlie
- Born: 10 April 1897; Queenstown, South Australia
- Died: 14 September 1986 (aged 89); South Australia

Playing career
Years	Club	Games (Goals)
1919–1926	Port Adelaide	94

Career highlights
- Port Adelaide premiership player (1921); Magarey Medalist (1921)

Charles Edwin George Adams (10 April 1897 – 14 September 1986) was an Australian rules footballer who played with Port Adelaide in the SAFL during the 1920s.

The 1921 season was the highlight of Adam's career, he played in a premiership side with Port Adelaide, won their best and fairest award and tied for the Magarey Medal. He lost the Magarey in a count-back but was awarded it retrospectively in 1998. Adams also won Port Adelaide's best and fairest award in 1920 and finished his senior career with 94 games to his name.
