= Jack Mack =

Australian rules footballer

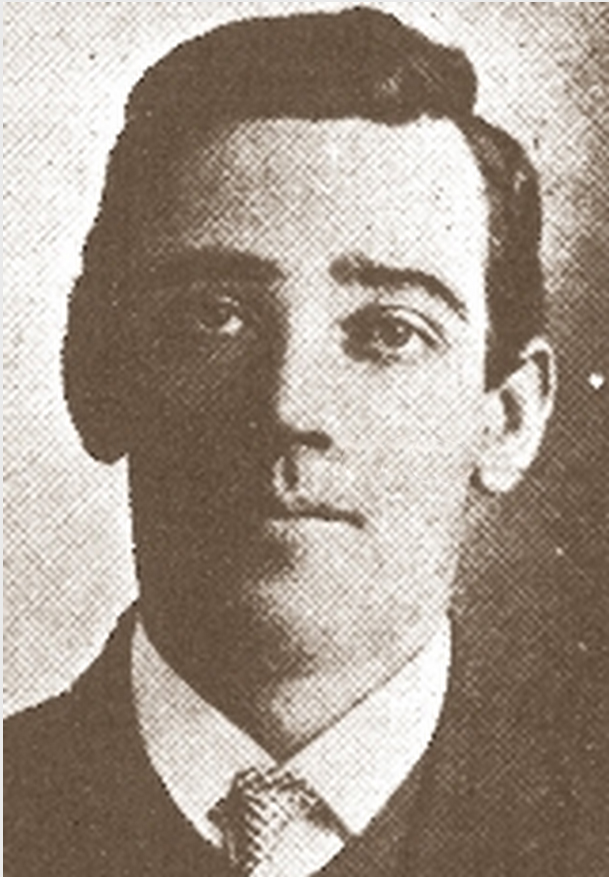

Personal information
- Full name: John Mack
- Born: 14 March 1881; Port Adelaide, South Australia
- Died: 8 June 1960 (aged 79); Port Adelaide, South Australia

Playing career
Years	Club	Games (Goals)
1900–1905	Port Adelaide	83
1906	Central Broken Hill	
1907–1909	Port Adelaide	31 (15)

Representative team honours
Years	Team	Games (Goals)
1907–1908	South Australia	3

Career highlights
- Port Adelaide premiership player (1903); Magarey Medal (1907); Port Adelaide best and fairest (1907); Central Broken Hill best all rounder (1906)

Jack Mack (14 March 1881 – 9 June 1960) was an Australian rules footballer who played with Port Adelaide in the South Australian National Football League (SANFL).

A follower, Mack made his debut for Port Adelaide in 1900 and played with the club until 1906 when he spent a season with Central Broken Hill. In 1907 he returned to Port Adelaide and won that year's Magarey Medal. That season he also represented South Australia at interstate football for the first time. He was part of his state's inaugural carnival team at Melbourne in 1908 and retired from the game after the 1909 season.

== See also ==
- 1908 Melbourne Carnival
