= Dave Low =

Australian rules footballer (1887–1916)

Personal information
- Full name: David Low
- Born: 6 April 1887; North Adelaide, South Australia
- Died: 4 August 1916 (aged 29); Edmonton, London
- Original team: North Broken Hill

Playing career^{1}
Years	Club	Games (Goals)
1910–1915	West Torrens	68 (0)
- ^{1} Playing statistics correct to the end of 1915.

David Low (6 April 1887 – 4 August 1916) was an Australian rules footballer who played with West Torrens in the South Australian Football League (SAFL).

Originally from Broken Hill, Low was a defender and debuted for West Torrens in 1910. He finished second in the 1911 Magarey Medal count and won the Medal the following season, becoming the first specialist defender to ever win it as well as the first from West Torrens. He was also Club Champion that season. During his career he was a regular South Australian interstate representative.

Low enlisted in the army in 1915 and went on to serve in Africa and Europe. He died in London on 4 August 1916 after being badly wounded in action.
