= Tom Hart (Australian footballer) =

Australian rules footballer

Personal information
- Full name: Thomas Paul Hart
- Born: 29 June 1896; Trentham East, Victoria
- Died: 25 May 1971 (aged 74); Daw Park, South Australia
- Original team: Norwood
- Height: 5 ft 9 in (175 cm)
- Position: Half-forward

Playing career^{1}
| Years | Club | Games (Goals) |
| 1923 | Carlton | 9 (13) |
- ^{1} Playing statistics correct to the end of 1923.

Thomas Paul Hart (29 June 1896 – 25 May 1971) was an Australian rules footballer who played for Carlton in the Victorian Football League (VFL) and Norwood in South Australia.

Originally with West Adelaide, Hart was a half forward flanker. He was wounded in France during World War 1 combat, at the age of 20, but survived. On return to the SAFL, Hart continued to perform well for Norwood and was the league's leading goal-kicker after kicking 50 goals in 1922, a premiership year. He was the first to kick 50 goals in a season since "Bos" Daly kicked 54 in 1903, and the first to kick ten in one game since J. Tompkins kicked 15 and Healey 10 for Port Adelaide, also in 1903.

Carlton lured him to their club in 1923 but he only spent a season with them before returning to South Australia. He kicked two goals in debut and a further two in all but one of his next six games.
