= Lindsay Head =

Australian rules footballer and cricketer

Lindsay Head MBE

Personal information
- Full name: Lindsay Hudson Head
- Born: 16 September 1935 (age 91); North Adelaide, South Australia
- Height: 180 cm (5 ft 11 in)
- Weight: 78 kg (12 st 5 lb)
- Position: Midfielder

Playing career^{1}
Years	Club	Games (Goals)
1952–1970	West Torrens	327 (519)

Representative team honours
Years	Team	Games (Goals)
1953–1964	South Australia	37

Coaching career
Years	Club	Games (W–L–D)
1959–1960, 1981	West Torrens	58 (22–35–1)
- ^{1} Playing statistics correct to the end of 1970.

Career highlights
- West Torrens premiership player 1953; West Torrens leading goalkicker 1954; Magarey Medal 1955, 1958, 1963; West Torrens best and fairest 1955–56, 1958–59, 1962–63, 1966–67; All-Australian team 1956; West Torrens life member 1962; West Torrens president 1984–88; West Torrens chairman 1986–88; SANFL life member; Australian Football Hall of Fame inaugural inductee 1996; South Australian Football Hall of Fame inaugural inductee 2002; Woodville-West Torrens life member; Woodville-West Torrens life governor

Lindsay Hudson Head MBE (born 16 September 1935 in North Adelaide, South Australia) is a former Australian rules footballer who played with West Torrens in the South Australian National Football League (SANFL). He was awarded three Magarey Medals during his career.

== SANFL ==
Lindsay Head's first experience of state representation came in 1947, when he played in a state schoolboys carnival at the age of eleven. In 1953, he lined up in the senior South Australian state team to play Victoria. By the time he was nineteen, he had won the first of his three Magarey Medals in only his fourth league season, with the others being in 1958 and 1963.

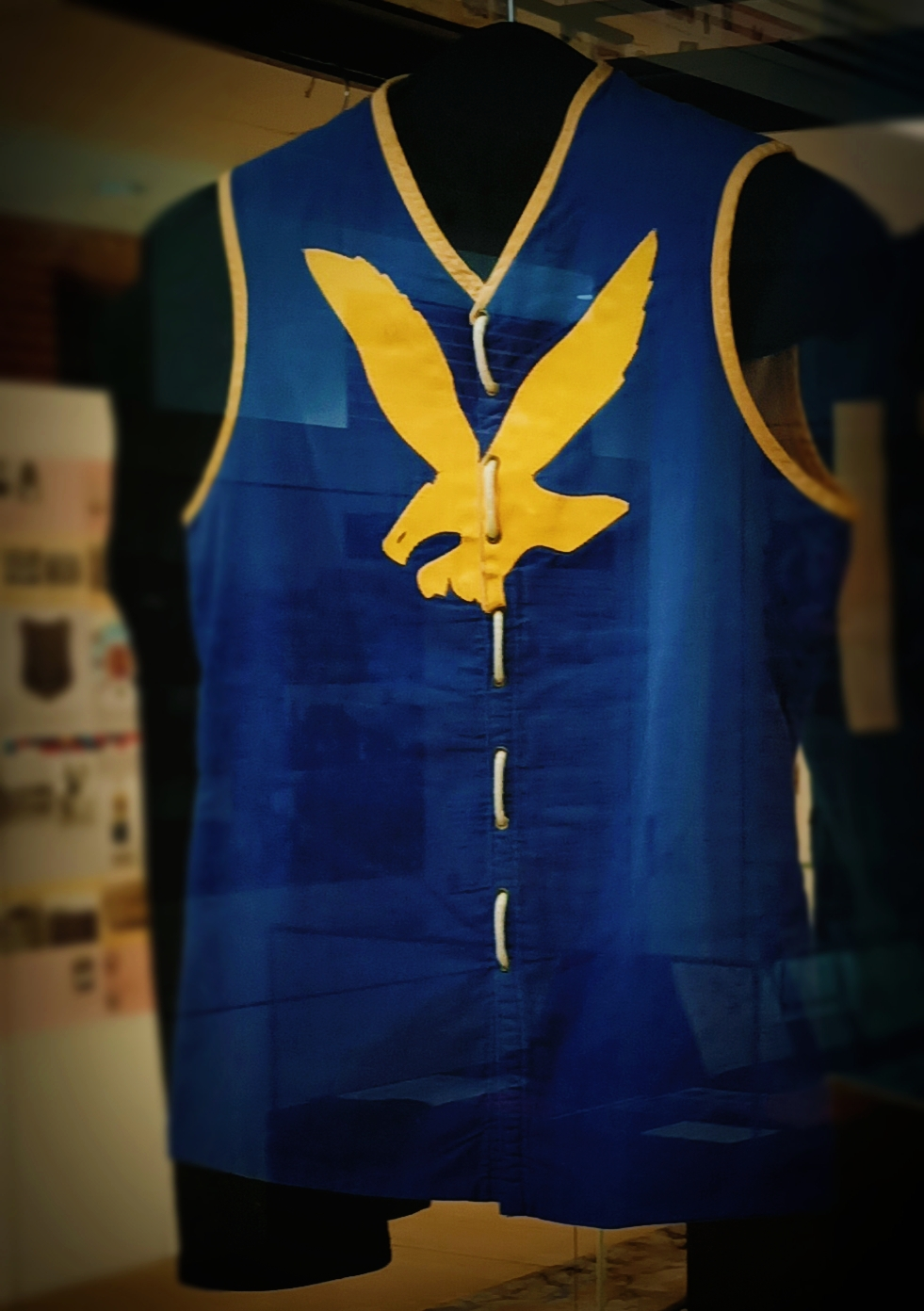
Head's 1966 West Torrens Guernsey on display at the State Library of South Australia.

Head played at SANFL level for nineteen seasons with West Torrens. His list of achievements for his club was notable: he played the most games for the club (327), won the club best and fairest award eight times, was club leading goalkicker twice, was captain-coach from 1959 to 1960 and captain in 1961, coached the club in 1981, and was also club president for five years. In his final season, in 1970, Head played his 320th career game to break Jack "Dinny" Reedman's long-standing South Australian elite football games record.

At state level, he represented South Australia on 37 occasions. He captained the state side in 1960, and was named an All-Australian at the 1956 Perth Carnival.

The Australian Football Hall of Fame's description refers to his "magnificent skills on both sides of his body," which is unfortunate as Head never learned to kick with his left foot. Instead he developed a check-side punt for passing and goal-shooting which was very accurate.

Head played in a premiership side in only his second ever season, but thereafter his side made the finals barely a handful of times in his remaining 17 seasons. His loyalty to his Eagles was therefore remarkable, particularly given that he was pursued not only by other SANFL clubs, but also by the wealthier Victorian Football League competition, notably receiving a big offer from the struggling South Melbourne in 1955.

== Other ==
Head played cricket for South Australia as a right-hand opening batsman (1957/58–1958/59). In nine matches he scored 425 runs at an average of 28.33.

He was appointed a Member of the Order of the British Empire (MBE) in the 1964 New Year Honours.

Lindsay Head is a Life Governor of the Woodville-West Torrens Eagles (which is the highest acknowledgement of the modern day Eagles).
