= West Torrens Football Club =

Australian rules football club

Names
- Full name: West Torrens Football Club
- Nickname: The Eagles

1990 season
- Leading goalkicker: L. Schache
- Best and fairest: Paul Pisani

Club details
- Founded: 1893 (as Port Natives)
- Dissolved: 1990 (Merged)
- Colours: Blue and Gold
- Competition: Adelaide and Suburban Association 1893-94; SANFL 1895-1990
- Premierships: 4 (1924, 1933, 1945, 1953)
- Ground: Jubilee Oval (1897–1904); Hindmarsh Oval (1905–1921); Thebarton Oval (1922–1989); Football Park (1990)

Uniforms
Home

West Torrens Football Club was an Australian rules football club that competed in the South Australian National Football League (SANFL) from 1895 to 1990. In 1991, the club merged with neighbouring Woodville Football Club to form the Woodville-West Torrens Eagles.

With the proposed introduction of representative Districts for clubs in the SAFA the Native Club in 1897 derived its name from Electoral district of West Torrens and based itself in the inner western suburbs of Adelaide, around the reaches of the River Torrens at Thebarton and Hindmarsh.

== Club history ==
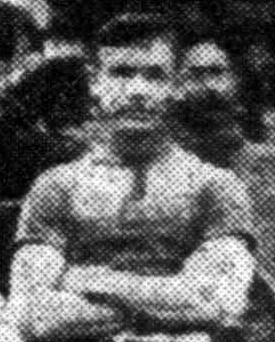
Charlie Fry former Port Adelaide player was captain of Port Natives in 1893.

A precursor club was the West Adelaide Football Club (1878–1887) that was founded in 1878 as the West Torrens and dissolved after just one season in the SAFA after changing its name to West Adelaide and wearing colours of Red, White and Blue in 1887.

=== Adelaide and Suburban Premiers (1893-94) ===
The annual general meeting of the Port Natives' Football Club was held at the Port Admiral Hotel on Tuesday evening 25 April 1893. There was a large attendance with Mr. J. Cox presiding. The following officers were elected for the ensuing year: Patron, Mr. R. S.Guthrie, M.L.C.; president, Mr. W. Knapman; vice-presidents, Messrs. J. Williams, W. Hounslow, Samuels, Gairdner, A. G. Osterstock, and D. Bower; committee, Messrs. H. Lane, W. Brady, and W. Stark; association delegates, Messrs. W. Brady, E. McGuiness, and J. Cox; secretary, Mr. J. Carr; captain, Mr. C. Fry; vice-captain, Mr. J. Cox. It was decided that the club should join the Adelaide and Suburban Association, and after several new members had been elected the meeting terminated with a vote of thanks to the chairman. In 1894 the Club also participated in Adelaide and Suburban Association as Port Natives along with West Adelaide and the Norwood and South Adelaide Seconds. winning back to back to back premierships in 1893 and 1894.

=== Formation of Natives Senior Club SAFA (1895) ===
On Friday evening 8 March 1895, a junior club the Port Native Football Club Premiers of the Adelaide and Suburban Association, who intended to enter the Senior Association during the ensuing season under the name of the "Natives," held a meeting at the Port Admiral Hotel. Mr. E. McInnes presided over a good attendance. The Secretary Mr J. Carr reported that at a previous meeting the following colours had been decided upon:— Darkblue guernsey with gold band, dark-blue trousers and hose. The following officers were elected: Patron, Mr. Ralph Potts; Presidents, the Mayor of Adelaide Mr. C. Tucker and the Mayor of Port Adelaide Mr. C. R. Morris: a number of Vice-Presidents; Secretary, Mr. S. W. Smith; Assistant Secretary, Mr. J. Carr; Treasurer, Mr. A. Darton; Delegates to the S.A.F.C., Messrs. E. Mclnnes and F. W. Ward; Proxy Delegates, Mr. W. H. Carr, the Secretary, and the Treasurer. A general committee was also elected.

The senior club that was formed originally was known as "The Natives" and competed in the 1895 SAFA season and 1896 SAFA season wearing Blue with a gold Hoop held its initial meetings at the President's Office at Grenfell Street in Adelaide.

=== Change of Name to West Torrens (1897) ===
With the introduction of Electoral Districts at a meeting of the SAFA on Monday 26th Oct 1896 at Prince Alfred Hotel the Natives delegates informed the SAFA that they intend to rename themselves West Torrens. At the Annual General Meeting held on Friday 19 March 1897 at Lady Daly Hotel, Hindmarsh it was passed unanimously that the Club would alter the name from The Natives Football Club to West Torrens Football Club.

=== Premierships and Star Players ===
In its history of almost 100 years, West Torrens won only four premierships; conversely, however, they only slumped to the wooden spoon on six occasions, evidence that they were generally quite competitive.

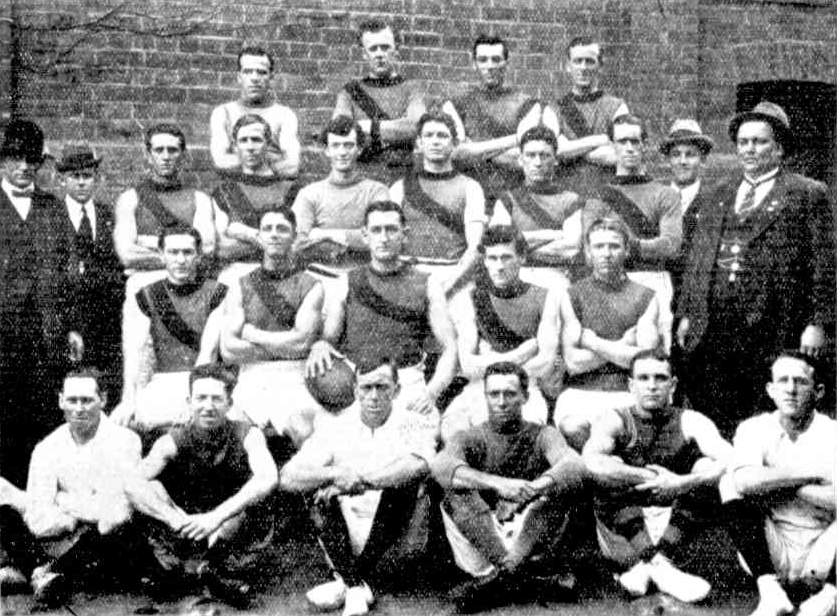
West Torrens 1918 Patriotic premiership team.

Despite their relative lack of team success, winning only four SANFL Premierships and one Night Premiership in their history (1924, 1933, 1945, 1953 and 1983 (night)), West Torrens boasted some of the best individual players ever to play Australian rules football. The club also won the 1918 Patriotic Premiership an unofficial league competition during World War 1. During World War II, West Torrens merged with Port Adelaide Football Club and won the 1942 premiership.

Players such as 1946 and 1947 Magarey Medallist, 1953 All-Australian and 1953 premiership captain Bob Hank, triple Magarey Medal winner (1955, 1958 & 1963), 1956 All-Australian and '53 premiership player Lindsay Head and former Australian Test cricketer Neil Hawke were all star players for the club.

=== Merger with Woodville ===
The club reached the finals for the last time in 1980 and by 1982 there were calls for West Torrens to merge with another club. In 1990, with the imminent entry of the South Australian-based Adelaide Crows into the national Australian Football League (AFL), it was decided that West Torrens and Woodville would amalgamate. In an apt moment, Woodville and West Torrens were drawn to play each other in their respective final games which was played at the Adelaide Oval. The two sides merged after the completion of the 1990 SANFL season and have since participated in the SANFL as the Woodville-West Torrens Eagles.

== SANFL Awards ==
- Premierships 4 (1924, 1933, 1945 & 1953)

West Torrens won an unofficial premiership in 1918 while the SANFL was officially disbanded for the duration of World War I.
During World War II, West Torrens merged with Port Adelaide Football Club and won the 1942 premiership.

- Minor premierships 2 (1924, 1963)
- Wooden Spoons 6 (1895 1st Season as Natives, 1930, 1941, 1975, 1976, 1986)
- SANFL Night premierships: 1 – 1983
- SANFL Reserves premierships: 17 – 1919, 1920, 1922, 1924, 1926, 1927, 1931, 1935, 1941, 1946, 1950, 1953, 1954, 1962, 1968, 1984, 1990
- SANFL Under 19's premierships: 9 – 1936, 1938, 1939, 1941, 1955, 1956, 1957, 1973, 1989
- SANFL Under 17's premierships: 3 – 1953, 1954, 1957

* 1983 SANFL Escort Cup Grand Final played at West Torrens home ground Thebarton Oval. The Eagles defeated South Adelaide in the last SANFL Night Grand Final to be played at a suburban ground.

Magarey Medallists

- Tom MacKenzie (1902)
- Dave Low (1912)
- John Karney (1921)*
- Max Pontifex (1932)
- Bob Hank (1946 & 1947)
- Lindsay Head (1955, 1958 & 1963)

* In 1998 John Karney, along with Charlie Adams (Port Adelaide) and Wat Scott (Norwood) was retrospectively awarded the 1921 Magarey Medal after he was originally in a four way tie with only South Adelaide's 1919 and 1920 Medal winner Dan Moriarty awarded the 1921 Medal.

SANFL leading goalkickers

- John Willis: 85 goals (1952)
- Geoff Kingston: 78 goals (1961)

== Club colours and emblems ==
- Blue and Gold (1895–1990)

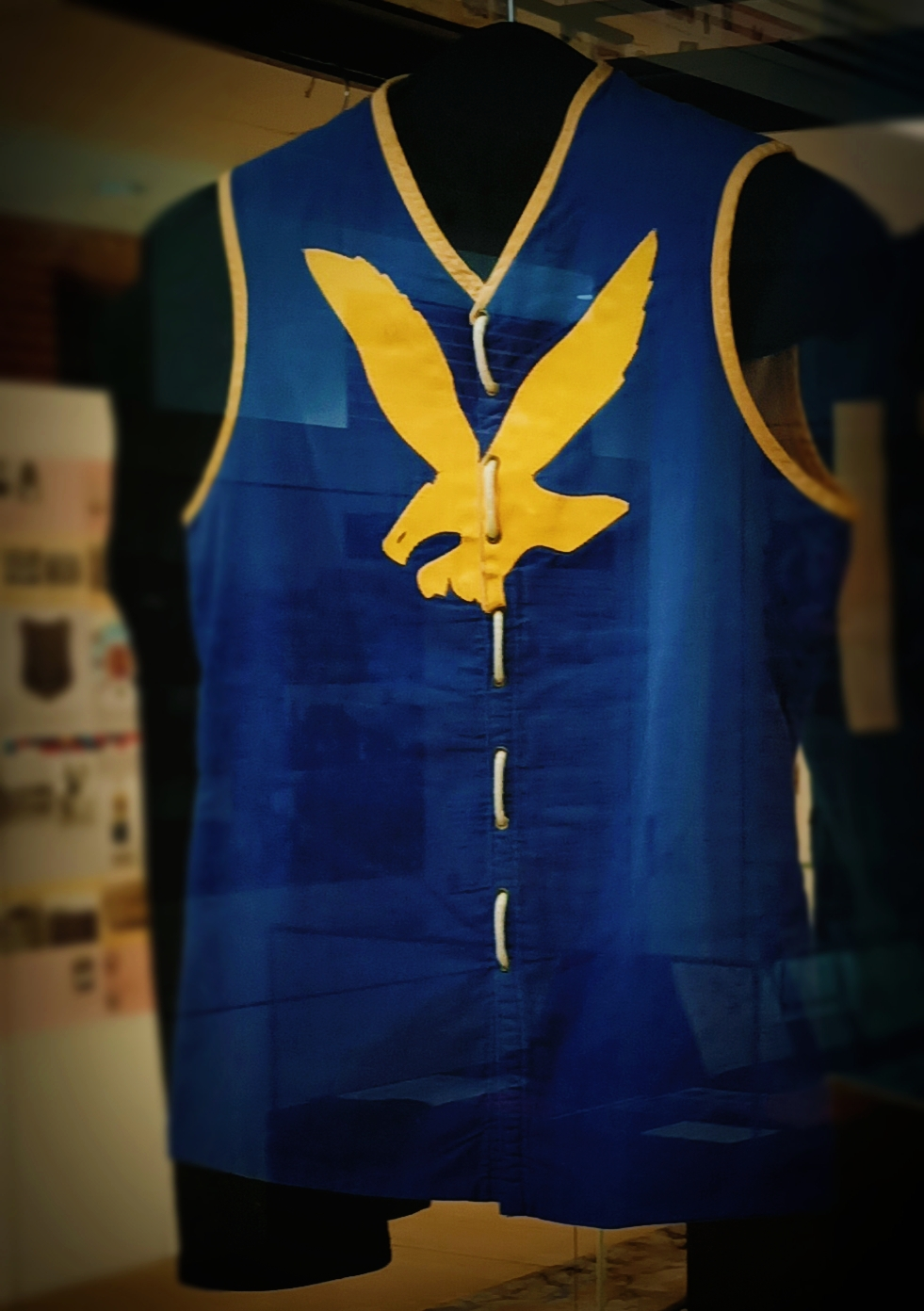
Lindsay Head's 1966 West Torrens Guernsey on display at the State Library of South Australia.

West Torrens was known as the Eagles from the early 1950s until their merging with Woodville.

== Home grounds ==
- Jubilee Oval (Adelaide) (1897–1904)
- Hindmarsh Oval (1905–21)
- Thebarton Oval (1922–89)
- Football Park, West Lakes (1990)

== Famous players ==
- Bob Hank: The dual Magarey Medallist captained West Torrens for nine seasons and was Club Best & Fairest a record nine times. He was inducted into the Australian Football Hall of Fame in 1999.
- Neil Hawke: The Test cricketer was also a star player with West Torrens following his clearance from Port Adelaide
- Lindsay Head: The three time Magarey Medallist is also club game record holder with 327 games. He was inducted into the Australian Football Hall of Fame in 1996.
- Bruce Lindsay: Captained West Torrens for seven seasons. At 29 was a member of the inaugural Adelaide Crows squad for the 1991 AFL season.
- Michael Long: Won West Torrens Best & Fairest in 1988. Won Norm Smith Medal as best on ground playing for Essendon in their 1993 AFL Grand Final win over Carlton. Of Aboriginal descent, Long has become a spokesman for Indigenous Australians and was inducted into the Australian Football Hall of Fame in 2007.
- Bob Shearman: Went on to captain the Sturt Football Club and play in several of their premiership sides. Challenge trophy between Sturt and Woodville-West Torrens Eagles is named after him.
- Neville Roberts: aka "Rocky" Roberts who wore a protective skull cap after an injury, before transferring to Norwood
- Kym Dillon: Also a breakfast radio announcer and Sports reporter/announcer for Channel 9 Adelaide.
- Steven Stretch: One of many SANFL players who were recruited into the VFL in the 1980s, playing for Melbourne and Fitzroy.
- Matthew Rendell: A 200 cm / 102 kg ruckman who played 79 games for West Torrens before playing 164 games for the Fitzroy Football Club in the VFL and winning two best and fairests in 1982/83. He played a further 13 games for the Brisbane Bears before retiring in 1992. Matthew's two brothers Tim and Steven also played for West Torrens.
- Peter Kelly: A former captain who played over 150 games for the Eagles during the 1970s.

== Club records ==
- South Australian Premiers: 4 – 1924, 1933, 1945, 1953
- SANFL Night Premiers (Escort Cup): 1 – 1983
- Record Attendance at Thebarton Oval: 20,832 v Norwood in 1962
- Record Attendance: 48,755 v Norwood at Adelaide Oval, 1948 SANFL Grand Final
- Most Games: 327 by Lindsay Head (1952–70)
- Most Goals in a Season: 85 by John Willis in 1952
- Highest Score: 34.15 (219) v South Adelaide at Adelaide Oval, Round 14, 1950
- Magarey Medallists: Tom MacKenzie (1902), Dave Low (1912), John Karney (1921), Max Pontifex (1932), Bob Hank (1946 & 1947), Lindsay Head (1955, 1958 & 1963)
- All-Australians: Bob Hank (1953), Lindsay Head (1956), Geoff Kingston (1961), Bob Shearman (1961)

Preceded by Norwood	SANFL premiers 1924	Succeeded by Norwood
Preceded by Sturt	SANFL premiers 1933	Succeeded by Glenelg
Preceded by Norwood	SANFL premiers 1945	Succeeded by Norwood
Preceded by North Adelaide	SANFL premiers 1953	Succeeded by Port Adelaide
