= Magarey Medal =

Australian rules football award

- The Magarey Medal, currently produced by Evright.
- Awarded for: The best and fairest player in the South Australian National Football League
- Location: Adelaide Oval
- Country: Australia
- Presented by: SANFL
- First award: 1898; 128 years ago
- Currently held by: Nik Rokahr, Norwood (2026)

The Magarey Medal is an Australian rules football honour awarded annually since 1898 to the fairest and most brilliant player in the South Australian National Football League (SANFL), as judged by field umpires. The award was created by William Ashley Magarey, then chairman of the league. The current recipient is Tom Lewis from the Sturt Football Club.

== History ==
William Magarey was born in Adelaide, South Australia. A lawyer by vocation, he had an enduring interest in sports, although he did not play football. He was, however, an active sports administrator who, in 1897, became the inaugural Chairman of the South Australian Football Association (later renamed the SANFL). The sport at that time was known for often rough play, and Magarey wanted to help combat this, and help gain more respect for umpires.

In 1898 Magarey presented the first Medal to South Australia’s "fairest and most brilliant player" of that season. Similar best and fairest player awards followed in other state-based competitions, notably the Sandover Medal in Western Australia from 1921 and Brownlow Medal in Victoria from 1924.

The Magarey Medal has been awarded in every year of SANFL competition since 1898, with the exception of 1900, 1904 (no record being extant), when the competition was suspended due to war 1916–1918, and when a restricted competition was held during the war period of 1942–1944.

After each match, the three field umpires (those umpires who control the flow of the game) confer and award 3, 2 and 1 point(s) to the players they regard as the best, second best and third best during the match. Players suspended for a reportable offence during the season are ineligible to win the award though they can continue gaining votes leading to times when an ineligible player would poll the most votes in the medal count but not win the medal. This occurred in 1912, 1968, 1983 and 1987 (see table below).

In the 1990s the awarding of the medal was changed so that players tied on the most votes would share the medal. Prior to this, a countback system was used, whereby the player with the most "best on ground" performances would be awarded the medal. In 1998, the centenary of the Magarey Medal, ten players who had finished runner-up over prior years, owing to the countback rule, were retrospectively awarded the medal. A single design of the medal was used after this.

== Recipients ==
The first recipient of the Magarey Medal was Norwood’s Alby Green in 1898.

Year	Player	Team	Votes
1898	Alby Green	Norwood	none
1899	Stan Malin	Port Adelaide	none
1900	No Award		
1901	Phil Sandland	North Adelaide	none
1902	Tom MacKenzie	West Torrens	none
1903	Hendrick Waye	Sturt	none
1904	No Award		
1905	Tom MacKenzie	North Adelaide	none
1906	Tom MacKenzie	North Adelaide	none
1907	Jack Mack	Port Adelaide	none
1908	James Tierney	West Adelaide	none
1909	Richard Head	West Adelaide	none
1910	Sampson Hosking	Port Adelaide	none
1911	Harold Cumberland	Sturt	none
1912	Dave Low	West Torrens	none****
1913	Tom Leahy	North Adelaide	none
1914	Jack Ashley	Port Adelaide	*
1915	Frank Barry	South Adelaide	*
1915	Charlie Perry	Norwood	*
1915	Sampson Hosking	Port Adelaide	*
Play suspended due to WWI
1919	Dan Moriarty	South Adelaide	*
1920	Vic Richardson	Sturt	*
1920	Dan Moriarty	South Adelaide	*
1921	John Karney	West Torrens	5*
1921	Charlie Adams	Port Adelaide	5*
1921	Dan Moriarty	South Adelaide	5*
1921	Wat Scott	Norwood	5*
1922	Robert Barnes	West Adelaide	8*
1923	Horrie Riley	Sturt	*
1924	Wat Scott	Norwood	*
1925	Alick Lill	Norwood	34***
1925	Peter Bampton	Port Adelaide	34***
1926	Bruce McGregor	West Adelaide	***
1927	Bruce McGregor	West Adelaide	***
1928	Jim Handby	Glenelg	***
1929	Robert Snell	West Adelaide	48***
1930	Wat Scott	Norwood	53***
1931	Jack Sexton	West Adelaide	44***
1932	Max Pontifex	West Torrens	37***
1933	Keith Dunn	Sturt	31***
1934	George Johnston	Glenelg	46***
1935	Jack Cockburn	South Adelaide	42***
1936	Bill McCallum	Norwood	31***
1937	Harold Hawke	North Adelaide	37***
1938	Bob Quinn	Port Adelaide	32***
1939	Jeff Pash	North Adelaide	16***
1939	Ray McArthur	West Adelaide	16***
1940	Mel Brock	Glenelg	19***
1941	Marcus Boyall	Glenelg	25***
Play suspended due to WWII
1945	Bob Quinn	Port Adelaide	46***
1946	Bob Hank	West Torrens	23***
1947	Bob Hank	West Torrens	26***
1948	Ron Phillips	North Adelaide	15
1949	Ron Phillips	North Adelaide	18
1949	Allan Crabb	Glenelg	18
1950	Ian McKay	North Adelaide	20
1951	John Marriott	Norwood	33
1952	Len Fitzgerald	Sturt	25
1953	Jim Deane	South Adelaide	26
1954	Len Fitzgerald	Sturt	22
1955	Lindsay Head	West Torrens	20
1956	Dave Boyd	Port Adelaide	18
1957	Ron Benton	West Adelaide	16
1957	Jim Deane	South Adelaide	16
1958	Lindsay Head	West Torrens	20
1959	Len Fitzgerald	Sturt	18
1960	Barrie Barbary	North Adelaide	24
1961	John Halbert	Sturt	20
1962	Ken Eustice	West Adelaide	22
1963	Lindsay Head	West Torrens	26
1964	Geof Motley	Port Adelaide	26
1965	Gary Window	Central District	16
1966	Ron Kneebone	Norwood	22
1967	Trevor Obst	Port Adelaide	18
1967	Don Lindner	North Adelaide	18
1968	Barrie Robran****	North Adelaide	22
1969	Fred Phillis	Glenelg	18
1970	Barrie Robran	North Adelaide	24
1971	Russell Ebert	Port Adelaide	21
1972	Malcolm Blight	Woodville	21
1973	Barrie Robran	North Adelaide	29
1974	Russell Ebert	Port Adelaide	28
1975	Peter Woite	Port Adelaide	20
1976	Russell Ebert	Port Adelaide	42
1977	Trevor Grimwood	West Adelaide	32
1978	Kym Hodgeman	Glenelg	50**
1979	John Duckworth	Central District	44**
1980	Russell Ebert	Port Adelaide	49**
1981	Michael Aish	Norwood	44**
1982	Tony McGuinness	Glenelg	44**
1983	Tony Antrobus****	North Adelaide	35**
1984	John Platten	Central District	66**
1985	Grantley Fielke	West Adelaide	54**
1986	Greg Anderson	Port Adelaide	23
1987	Andrew Jarman****	North Adelaide	23
1988	Greg Whittlesea	Sturt	28
1989	Gilbert McAdam	Central District	23
1990	Scott Hodges	Port Adelaide	16
First AFL Season.
1991	Mark Naley	South Adelaide	29
1992	Nathan Buckley	Port Adelaide	27
1993	Brenton Phillips	North Adelaide	20
1994	Garry McIntosh	Norwood	22
1995	Glenn Kilpatrick	West Adelaide	17
1995	Garry McIntosh	Norwood	17
1996	Josh Francou	North Adelaide	26
1997	Brodie Atkinson	Sturt	23
1997	Andrew Jarman	Norwood	23
1998	Andrew Osborn	South Adelaide	16
1999	Damian Squire	Sturt	21
2000	Damian Squire	Sturt	21
2001	Tony Brown	Port Adelaide	19
2001	Ryan O'Connor	Port Adelaide	19
2002	Tim Weatherald	Sturt	16
2002	Jade Sheedy	Sturt	16
2003	Brett Ebert	Port Adelaide	25
2004	Paul Thomas	Central District	22
2005	Jeremy Clayton	Port Adelaide	24
2006	Brett Backwell	Glenelg	26
2007	James Allan	North Adelaide	19
2008	Luke Crane	Sturt	22
2009	James Ezard	West Adelaide	18
2009	Rhys Archard	North Adelaide	18
2010	James Allan	North Adelaide	22
2011	James Allan	North Adelaide	25
2012	Joel Cross****	South Adelaide	18
2012	Brad Symes****	Central District	18
2013	Matt Thomas	Norwood	26
2014	Zane Kirkwood	Sturt	29
2015	Joel Cross	South Adelaide	25
2016	Zane Kirkwood	Sturt	24
2017	Mitch Grigg	Norwood	23
2018	Mitch Grigg	Norwood	26
2019	Luke Partington	Glenelg	26
2020	Campbell Combe	North Adelaide	19
2021	Bryce Gibbs	South Adelaide	21
2021	James Tsitas	Woodville-West Torrens	21
2022	Aaron Young	North Adelaide	23
2023	Harry Grant	Central District	27
2024	Harry Boyd	Norwood	34
2024	Will Snelling	Sturt	34
2025	Tom Lewis	Sturt	33
2026	Nik Rokahr	Norwood	38

- (*) signifies that 1 vote was awarded by one umpire each game.
- (**) signifies two umpires each awarded 3,2,1 votes each game.
- (***) signifies one umpire awarded 5,3,1 votes each game.
- Those without an asterisk signify a maximum of 3 votes awarded each game along with 2 and 1.
- (****) Players who polled the most votes but were ineligible due to suspension: Peter Darley (1968, tied for first); Stephen Kernahan (1983, 44 votes); Garry McIntosh (1987, 25 votes); James Boyd (2012, 26 votes). In 1912 votes were not awarded; Harold Oliver was unanimously considered the competition's best player, but was declared ineligible for the award due to a fight with Ed Edwards of Norwood.

=== Multiple recipients ===
The following players have been multiple recipients of the medal.

Years	Player	Team
Quadruple winner
1971, 1974, 1976, 1980	R Ebert	Port Adelaide
Triple winners
1902, 1905, 1906	T D MacKenzie	West Torrens / North Adelaide
1921, 1924, 1930	W Scott	Norwood
1919, 1920, 1921	D Moriarty	South Adelaide
1952, 1954, 1959	L C Fitzgerald	Sturt
1955, 1958, 1963	L H Head	West Torrens
1968, 1970, 1973	B C Robran	North Adelaide
2007, 2010, 2011	J Allan	North Adelaide
Double winners
1910, 1915	S Hosking	Port Adelaide
1926, 1927	H B McGregor	West Adelaide
1938, 1945	R B Quinn	Port Adelaide
1946, 1947	R W Hank	West Torrens
1948, 1949	H R Phillips	North Adelaide
1953, 1957	J Deane	South Adelaide
1994, 1995	G McIntosh	Norwood
1987, 1997	A N Jarman	North Adelaide / Norwood
1999, 2000	D Squire	Sturt
2012, 2015	J Cross	South Adelaide
2014, 2016	Z Kirkwood	Sturt
2017, 2018	M Grigg	Norwood

Malcolm Blight (1972), John Platten (1984) and Nathan Buckley (1992) are Magarey Medallists who subsequently won a Brownlow Medal as best and fairest players in AFL/VFL competition.

Nick Rohkar (2026) is the only Magarey Medallist who has also won a Sandover Medal (2024) as the best and fairest player in the WAFL competition.
