= Neil Kerley Medal =

The Neil Kerley Medal (formerly known as the Trabilsie Medal and later the Steve Hamra Medal) is an Australian rules football award given to the player(s) from the West Adelaide Football Club deemed Best & Fairest for the season. West Adelaide play in the South Australian National Football League.

In 2015, the WAFC board approved the change of the naming of the Best and Fairest Medallion as the Neil Kerley Medal to honour four time club B&F and two time premiership winner as a player and coach, Neil Kerley.

The Neil Kerley Medal is not to be confused with the best-on-ground award between West Adelaide and the Adelaide reserves team, awarded since 2024.

== Recipients ==
^	Denotes current player
+	Player won Magarey Medal in same season
#	West Adelaide premiership season

Season	Recipient(s)	Ref.
1945	Garth Burkett	
1946	Garth Burkett ^{(2)}	
1947#	Bernie Smith	
1948	Colin Brown	
1949	James Coad	
1950	Brian Faehse	
1951	Brian Faehse ^{(2)}	
1952	Jack Lynch	
1953	Colin Brown ^{(2)}	
1954	Colin Brown ^{(3)}	
1955	Glynn Williams	
1956	Stan Costello	
1956	Aldo Rossetto	
1957	Ron Benton+	
1958	Neil Kerley	
1959	Neil Kerley ^{(2)}	
1960	Jeff Bray	
1961#	Neil Kerley ^{(3)}	
1962	Neil Kerley ^{(4)}	
1963	Jeff Bray ^{(2)}	
1964	Rodney Pope	
1965	Robert Day	
1966	Robert Day ^{(2)}	
1967	Trevor Hughes	
1968	Rodney Pope ^{(2)}	
1969	Gary Wallis	
1970	Robert Day ^{(3)}	
1971	Simon Fraser	
1972	Greg Nicholson	
1973	Bob Keddie	
1974	Bob Loveday	
1975	Bob Loveday ^{(2)}	
1976	Trevor Grimwood	
1977	Trevor Grimwood+ ^{(2)}	
1978	Dexter Kennedy	
1979	Michael Gregg	
1980	Ian Borchard	
1981	John Kantilaftas	
1982	Ian Borchard ^{(2)}	
1983#	Mark Mickan	
1984	Des Herbert	
1985	Mark Mickan ^{(2)}	
1986	Mark Mickan ^{(3)}	
1987	Kieran Sporn	
1988	Neville Shaw	
1989	Neville Shaw ^{(2)}	
1990	Grantley Fielke	
1991	Peter Banfield	
1992	Leon Grosser	
1993	Mark Mickan ^{(4)}	
1994	Jamie Andriske	
1995	Anthony Banik	
1996	Brooke Fogden	
1997	Anthony Banik ^{(2)}	
1998	Adam Richardson	
1999	Tim Symes	
2000	Dion Myles	
2001	Ben Hollands	
2002	Chris Chubb	
2003	Darren Bradshaw	
2004	Luke Norman	
2005	Jason Porplyzia	
2006	Ben Haynes	
2007	Simon McCormick	
2008	Ryan Ferguson	
2009	Ryan Ferguson ^{(2)}	
2010	Daniel Caire	
2011	Steven Morris	
2012	Ryan Ferguson ^{(3)}	
2013	Chris Schmidt	
2013	Ryan Ferguson ^{(4)}	
2014	Jonathon Beech	
2015#	Jason Porplyzia ^{(2)}	
2016	Chris Schmidt ^{(2)}	
2017	Kaine Stevens	
2018	Kaine Stevens ^{(2)}	
2019	Logan Hill	
2020	Isaac Johnson	
2021	Logan Hill ^{(2)}	
2021	Thomas Keough	
2022	Hamish Hartlett	
2023	Josh Ryan	
2024	Sam Frost^	
2024	Kobe Ryan^	
2025	Tom Morrish^	
