= 2013 Port Adelaide Football Club season =

Port Adelaide Football Club
2013 season
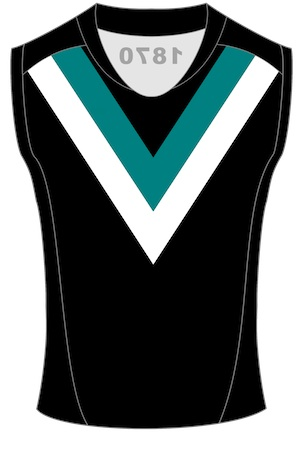
- Port Adelaide's guernsey for the 2013 season
- President: David Koch
- Coach: Ken Hinkley
- Captain: Travis Boak
- Home ground: AAMI Stadium
- NAB Cup: 9th
- AFL season: 5th
- Best and Fairest: Chad Wingard
- Leading goalkicker: Jay Schulz (49)
- Highest home attendance: 45,247 vs Carlton (31 August 2013)

The 2013 AFL season was the Port Adelaide Football Club's 17th season in the Australian Football League (AFL). The club was captained by Travis Boak and coached by Ken Hinkley.

== Draft picks ==
Round	Pick	Player	State/Nationality	Recruited From	League
National Draft
1	7	Ollie Wines	(Victoria (state)) Victoria	Bendigo Pioneers	TAC Cup
2	29	Tom Clurey	(Victoria (state)) Victoria	Murray Bushrangers	TAC Cup
2	30	Mason Shaw	Western Australia	South Fremantle Bulldogs	WAFL
5	85	Tom Jonas	South Australia	Rookie Promotion	
Pre-Season Draft
1	3	Sam Colquhoun	South Australia	Central District Bulldogs	SANFL
Rookie Draft
1	5	Kane Mitchell	Western Australia	Claremont Tigers	WAFL
2	20	Justin Hoskin	South Australia	Port Adelaide Magpies	SANFL

== Transactions ==
=== Overview ===
Players Added

Via trade

- Angus Monfries
- Jack Hombsch
- Jake Neade
- Lewis Stevenson
- Campbell Heath

Via free agency
-

Players Lost

Via trade

- David Rodan

Via free agency

- Danyle Pearce
- Troy Chaplin

=== Trades ===
9 October 2012

To Essendon Bombers
- No. 48 Pick
To Port Adelaide Power
- Angus Monfries
23 October 2012

To Greater Western Sydney Giants
- No. 29 Pick
To Port Adelaide Power
- Jack Hombsch
- Jake Neade
25 October 2012

To Melbourne Demons
- David Rodan
To Port Adelaide Power
- No. 88 Pick
25 October 2012

To West Coast Eagles
- No. 88 Pick
To Port Adelaide Power
- Lewis Stevenson
25 October 2012

To Sydney Swans
- No. 72 Pick
To Port Adelaide Power
- Campbell Heath
- No. 85 Pick

=== Free Agents ===
==== Subtractions ====
Player	Signed	New Team
Danyle Pearce	Signed 3 Year Contract	Fremantle Dockers
Troy Chaplin	Signed 4 Year Contract	Richmond Tigers

== 2013 Playing List ==
Senior List
No.	Born	Player	Hgt	Wgt	Date of birth	Age in 2013	Debut	Recruited from	2013 Games	2013 Goals	Career Games	Career Goals
1	(Victoria (state))	Travis Boak	183	83	1 August 1988	25	2007	Geelong Falcons

== Pre-season results ==
2013 pre-season games: 3–2 (Home: 2–1; Away: 1–1)
Game	Time; Date	Team	Score	Most Goals	Most Disposals	Venue; Attendance	Record
1	5:15pm 17 February	St Kilda	W 65–15			AAMI Stadium; 8,966	1–0
2	6:20pm 17 February	Adelaide	L 27–43			AAMI Stadium; 8,966	1–1
3	4:00pm 3 March	Melbourne	L 76–78	Daniel Stewart (3)	Kane Mitchell (26)	Renmark Oval; 3,764	1–2
4	7:00pm 9 March	West Coast	W 92–86	Chad Wingard (3)	Travis Boak (24)	Traeger Park; 4,244	2–2
5	1:00pm 16 March	Sydney	W 102–72	Travis Boak (3)	Travis Boak (29)	AAMI Stadium; 5,042	3–2
2013 NAB Cup Schedule

== Home and Away season ==
=== Games ===
2013 Home and Away Games: 12–10 (Home: 8–3; Away: 4–7)
Round	Time; Date	Team	Score	Most Goals	Most Disposals	Venue; Attendance	Record
1	1:10pm 31 March	Melbourne	W 133–54	Jay Schulz (4)	Brad Ebert (30)	MCG; 22,924	1–0
2	7:10pm 6 April	Greater Western Sydney	W 134–78	Justin Westhoff (5)	Kane Cornes (30)	AAMI Stadium; 25,122	2–0
3	4:10pm 14 April	Adelaide	W 118–109	Justin Westhoff (4)	Travis Boak (30); Kane Cornes (30)	AAMI Stadium; 40,707	3–0
4	7:40pm 20 April	Gold Coast	W 104–66	Jay Schulz (4)	Kane Cornes (35)	Metricon Stadium; 11,332	4–0
5	7:10pm 27 April	West Coast	W 84–79	Travis Boak (2) etc.	Kane Cornes (26)	AAMI Stadium; 26,132	5–0
6	2:10pm 4 May	North Melbourne	L 83–93	Jay Schulz (3)	Travis Boak (30)	Blundstone Arena; 10,265	5–1
7	1:15pm 11 May	Richmond	L 73–114	Jay Schulz (3)	Kane Cornes (29)	AAMI Stadium; 25,372	5–2
8	1:10pm 19 May	Carlton	L 91–109	Andrew Moore (3)	Kane Cornes (23)	Etihad Stadium; 29,936	5–3
9	1:15pm 25 May	Geelong	L 68–116	Jay Schulz (3)	Travis Boak (28)	AAMI Stadium; 21,309	5–4
10	7:10pm 1 June	Western Bulldogs	L 58–67	Chad Wingard (2)	Kane Cornes (28)	TIO Stadium; 7,850	5–5
11	Bye
12	1:10pm 16 June	Greater Western Sydney	W 125–50	Travis Boak (2) etc.	Kane Cornes (34)	Skoda Stadium; 6,601	6–5
13	1:10pm 22 June	Sydney	W 72–54	Chad Wingard (3)	Brad Ebert (26)	AAMI Stadium; 16,096	7–5
14	4:10pm 29 June	Collingwood	W 86–51	Jay Schulz (3); Justin Westhoff (3)	Matthew Broadbent (34)	AAMI Stadium; 31,121	8–5
15	4:40pm 7 July	Essendon	L 88–118	Angus Monfries (4)	Brad Ebert (36)	Etihad Stadium; 40,817	8–6
16	1:15pm 13 July	Hawthorn	L 79–124	Angus Monfries (2); Jake Neade (2)	Travis Boak (34)	AAMI Stadium; 23,748	8–7
17	7:40pm 20 July	St Kilda	W 97–92	John Butcher (3)	Matthew Broadbent (25)	Etihad Stadium; 14,878	9–7
18	12:40pm 28 July	Brisbane	W 71–61	Jay Schulz (2)	Travis Boak (27)	AAMI Stadium; 22,631	10–7
19	2:45pm 4 August	Adelaide	W 107–103	Chad Wingard (5)	Kane Cornes (31)	AAMI Stadium; 43,368	11–7
20	2:10pm 10 August	Geelong	104–129	Angus Monfries (7)	Travis Boak (30)	Simonds Stadium; 24,784	11–8
21	1:40pm 17 August	Gold Coast	113–96	Travis Boak (3); Jay Schulz (3)	Travis Boak (35)	AAMI Stadium; 18,703	12–8
22	5:40pm 24 August	Fremantle	60–134	Jay Schulz (1) etc.	Kane Cornes (29)	Patersons Stadium; 35,565	12–9
23	4:10pm 31 August	Carlton	103–104	Brad Ebert (4); Jay Schulz (4)	Kane Cornes (35)	AAMI Stadium; 45,127	12–10
2013 AFL Season Schedule

== Finals ==
2013 Finals Games
Round	Time; Date	Team	Score	Most Goals	Most Disposals	Venue; Attendance
EF	7:45pm 7 September	Collingwood	87–63	Jay Schulz (3); Chad Wingard (3)	Kane Cornes (28)	MCG; 51,722
SF	7:50pm 13 September	Geelong	96–80	Justin Westhoff (3)	Travis Boak (26)	MCG; 52,744

== Ladder ==
2013 AFL ladder
Pos	Team	Pld	W	L	D	PF	PA	PP	Pts	
1	Hawthorn (P)	22	19	3	0	2523	1859	135.7	76	Finals series
2	Geelong	22	18	4	0	2409	1776	135.6	72	Finals series
3	Fremantle	22	16	5	1	2035	1518	134.1	66	Finals series
4	Sydney	22	15	6	1	2244	1694	132.5	62	Finals series
5	Richmond	22	15	7	0	2154	1754	122.8	60	Finals series
6	Collingwood	22	14	8	0	2148	1868	115.0	56	Finals series
7	Port Adelaide	22	12	10	0	2051	2002	102.4	48	Finals series
8	Carlton	22	11	11	0	2125	1992	106.7	44	Finals series
9	Essendon	22	14	8	0	2145	2000	107.3	56 (Note: Essendon was relegated to ninth due to irregularities in its supplements program during the 2012 season.)	
10	North Melbourne	22	10	12	0	2307	1930	119.5	40	
11	Adelaide	22	10	12	0	2064	1909	108.1	40	
12	Brisbane Lions	22	10	12	0	1922	2144	89.6	40	
13	West Coast	22	9	13	0	2038	2139	95.3	36	
14	Gold Coast	22	8	14	0	1918	2091	91.7	32	
15	Western Bulldogs	22	8	14	0	1926	2262	85.1	32	
16	St Kilda	22	5	17	0	1751	2120	82.6	20	
17	Melbourne	22	2	20	0	1455	2691	54.1	8	
18	Greater Western Sydney	22	1	21	0	1524	2990	51.0	4	

Source: AFL Tables
Rules for classification: 1) points; 2) percentage; 3) number of points for.
(P) Premiers

=== Ladder progress ===
Round	1	2	3	4	5	6	7	8	9	10	11	12	13	14	15	16	17	18	19	20	21	22	23
Ground	A	H	H	A	H	A	H	A	H	A	B	A	H	H	A	H	A	H	A	A	H	A	H
Result	W	W	W	W	W	L	L	L	L	L	-	W	W	W	L	L	W	W	W	L	W	L	L
Position	1	2	2	2	2	4	4	6	9	11	11	10	8	7	8	8	8	8	8	8	8	8	7

Source: Competitive Matches
A = Away; H = Home; B = Bye; W = Win; D = Draw; L = Lose

== Season statistics ==
=== Home attendance ===
Round	Opponent	Attendance
2	Greater Western Sydney	25,122
3	Adelaide	40,707
5	West Coast	26,132
7	Richmond	25,372
9	Geelong	21,309
13	Sydney	16,096
14	Collingwood	31,121
16	Hawthorn	23,748
18	Brisbane Lions	22,631
21	Gold Coast	18,703
23	Carlton	45,127
Total attendance		296,068
Average Attendance		26,915

=== Top 5 Goal Scorers ===
No.	Player	Games	Season Goals
1	Jay Schulz	23	47
2	Chad Wingard	23	43
3	Angus Monfries	23	38
4	Justin Westhoff	22	28
5	Travis Boak	22	20
Average Goals per game			-

== Awards ==
=== Brownlow Medal ===
Votes	Player
Travis Boak	13
Brad Ebert	11
Chad Wingard	8

=== John Cahill Medal ===
Votes	Player
Chad Wingard	-
Travis Boak	-
Kane Cornes	-

=== Other Awards ===
Award Name	Player
-	-

== SANFL season ==
=== Results ===
**Round**	**Date and local time**	**Opponent**	**Scores** (Port Adelaide's scores indicated in **bold**)			**Venue**	**Ladder** **position**
**Round**	**Date and local time**	**Opponent**	Home	Away	Result	**Venue**	**Ladder** **position**
1	Thursday, 28 March (7:40 pm)	Norwood	16.11 (107)	**4.10 (34)**	Lost by 73 points	Norwood Oval **[A]**	8th
2	Friday, 5 April (7:10 pm)	Sturt	18.8 (116)	**16.14 (110)**	Lost by 6 points	The Parade **[A]**	9th
3	Saturday, 13 April (2:10 pm)	Glenelg	**16.10 (106)**	15.14 (104)	Won by 2 points	Alberton Oval **[H]**	7th
4	Bye						-
5	Saturday, 27 April (2:10 pm)	Woodville-West Torrens	16.8 (104)	**11.9 (75)**	Lost by 29 points	Thebarton Oval **[A]**	7th
6	Sunday, 5 May (2:10 pm)	Central District				Alberton Oval **[H]**	-
7	Friday, 17 May (2:10 pm)	West Adelaide				Richmond Oval **[A]**	-
8	Sunday, 26 May (2:10 pm)	North Adelaide				Alberton Oval **[H]**	-
9	Bye						-
10	Sunday, 9 June (2:10 pm)	South Adelaide				Alberton Oval **[H]**	-
11	Saturday, 15 June (2:10 pm)	Norwood				Alberton Oval **[H]**	-
12	Saturday, 22 June (2:10 pm)	Central District				Elizabeth Oval **[A]**	-
13	Sunday, 30 June (2:10 pm)	Woodville-West Torrens				Alberton Oval **[H]**	-
14	Bye						-
15	Sunday, 14 July (2:10 pm)	Sturt				Unley Oval **[A]**	-
16	Saturday, 20 July (2:10 pm)	North Adelaide				Prospect Oval **[A]**	-
17	Saturday, 27 July (2:10 pm)	Glenelg	**9.9 (63)**	8.12 (60)	Won by 3 points	Alberton Oval **[H]**	6th
18	Friday, 2 August (7:40 pm)	Norwood				Norwood Oval **[A]**	-
19	Sunday, 11 August (2:10 pm)	Central District				Alberton Oval **[H]**	-
20	Sunday, 18 May (2:10 pm)	South Adelaide				Hickinbotham Oval **[A]**	-
21	Sunday, 25 August (2:10 pm)	Sturt				Alberton Oval **[H]**	-
22	Saturday, 31 August (12:00 pm)	West Adelaide				Alberton Oval **[H]**	-
23	Saturday, 7 September (12:00 pm)	Glenelg				Glenelg Oval **[A]**	-
2013 SANFL Season Schedule

The Port Adelaide Magpies home guernsey for the 2013 SANFL season.

=== Ladder ===
2013 Ladder
Pos	Team	Pld	W	L	D	PF	PA	PP	Pts
1	Norwood (P)	20	17	3	0	1759	1055	62.51	34
2	Woodville-West Torrens	20	13	7	0	1788	1486	54.61	26
3	West Adelaide	20	12	8	0	1682	1306	56.29	24
4	Central District	20	12	8	0	1729	1511	53.36	24
5	North Adelaide	20	11	9	0	1828	1534	54.37	22
**6**	Port Adelaide	**20**	**8**	**12**	**0**	**1418**	**1693**	**45.58**	16
7	Sturt	20	7	13	0	1536	1847	45.40	14
8	South Adelaide	20	6	14	0	1220	1933	38.69	12
9	Glenelg	20	4	16	0	1442	2064	41.13	8

Source: australianfootball.com
Rules for classification: 1) points; 2) percentage; 3) number of points for.
(P) Premiers
