= Jeff Bray =

Jeff Bray may refer to:

- Jeff Bray (footballer) (1938–2006), Australian rules footballer, West Adelaide and South Melbourne
- Jeff Bray (politician) (born 1964), Canadian Liberal politician from British Columbia
