= Chris Schmidt =

Chris Schmidt may refer to:

- Chris Schmidt (footballer) (born 1989), Australian footballer
- Chris Schmidt (ice hockey) (born 1976), Canadian ice hockey centre who plays in Germany
