= Dion Myles =

Australian rules footballer

Personal information
- Born: 2 May 1976 (age 50)
- Original team: Baulkham Hills Falcons (Sydney AFL)
- Debut: Round 18, 1995, Sydney vs. Brisbane, at SCG
- Height: 188 cm (6 ft 2 in)
- Weight: 79 kg (174 lb)

Playing career^{1}
Years	Club	Games (Goals)
1995–1997	Sydney Swans	8 (1)
- ^{1} Playing statistics correct to the end of 1997.

Dion Myles (born 2 May 1976) is a former Australian rules footballer who played in the Australian Football League (AFL) for the Sydney Swans between 1995 and 1997.

Myles played eight games and kicked one goal for Sydney, debuting against Brisbane in round 18, 1995 and playing his final game against Carlton in round 21, 1997.

Miles went on to play with West Adelaide in the South Australian National Football League (SANFL), helping them to a 3rd-place finish in 1998 and going on to win the club's Best & Fairest award in 2000.
