= Ben Haynes =

Australian rules footballer (born 1981)

Personal information
- Born: 27 June 1981 (age 45)
- Original team: Rockbank / Melton South
- Debut: 16-Jul-2000, Richmond vs. Fremantle, at WACA
- Height: 182 cm (6 ft 0 in)
- Weight: 83 kg (183 lb)

Playing career^{1}
Years	Club	Games (Goals)
2000–2001	Richmond	5 (0)
2002–2005	Essendon	21 (11)
Total		26 (11)
- ^{1} Playing statistics correct to the end of 2005.

Career highlights
- West Adelaide Best & Fairest 2006

Ben Haynes (born 27 June 1981) is an Australian rules footballer who played in the Australian Football League (AFL) for Richmond and Essendon Football Clubs and in the South Australian National Football League (SANFL) for West Adelaide Football Club. He also played for Melton South Panthers.

== Career ==
Haynes was rookie-listed at Richmond before his elevation to the main list for the 2000 AFL season. After making his senior debut on 16 July 2000 against Fremantle Football Club at the WACA Ground, Haynes played five games for Richmond before his delistment after the 2001 AFL season.

Essendon added him to their rookie list in 2002 and elevated him to the senior list for the 2003 AFL season. Haynes played 21 games for Essendon, including finals football, and was delisted after the 2005 AFL season.

Haynes joined SANFL club West Adelaide in 2006, winning the club's Best & Fairest award in the same season.

In 2007 Haynes joined YVMDFL 1st Division club Silvan, kicking 119 goals,(including 5 in the Grand Final) alongside ex Essendon teammate Gary Moorcroft who also kicked 119 goals in 2007, leading Silvan to a dominant premiership. In 2008 Haynes took over the senior coaching role at Silvan, leading the club to an undefeated season, and securing the club's first back to back premierships. After stepping down from his coaching role at Silvan at the end of 2009, Haynes joined Maribyrnong Park, where he played a pivotal role in securing the Lions' first ever back-to-back 1st Division premierships. In difficult conditions, Haynes was a clear standout in the Grand Final, and was awarded the Best on Ground Medal for his dominate performance. In 2011 Haynes joined the Montmorency Football Club in the Northern Football League, where he played out his remaining years, unfortunately not adding to his premiership tally.

== Coaching and personal life ==
After retiring from playing at the end of the 2015 season, Haynes was appointed senior coach at Montmorency, where he led the Magpies from 2016 to 2018, after which Haynes remained involved at Montmorency in various off-field roles.
