= Gary Wallis (footballer) =

Australian rules footballer

Personal information
- Full name: Gary Thomas Wallis
- Born: 12 July 1946 (age 80)
- Original team: Lalor
- Height: 174 cm (5 ft 9 in)
- Weight: 70 kg (154 lb)

Playing career^{1}
| Years | Club | Games (Goals) |
| 1966–1968 | Collingwood (VFL) | 33 (34) |
| 1968 | St Kilda (VFL) | 3 (4) |
| 1969–? | West Adelaide (SANFL) | ? (?) |
- ^{1} Playing statistics correct to the end of 1977.

Career highlights
- VFL debut with Collingwood on 14 May 1966 v Richmond at Victoria Park; SANFL debut with West Adelaide on 5 April 1969; West Adelaide Best & Fairest 1969, 1973

Gary Wallis (born 12 July 1946) is a former Australian rules footballer who played with Collingwood and St Kilda in the Victorian Football League (VFL) during the 1960s.

Wallis was captain of the Collingwood Under-19s team which won a premiership in 1965. The following season he was a regular in the seniors and played 17 games of a possible 20 games. Wallis, who kicked 27 goals that year, was a member of the Collingwood side which lost the 1966 VFL Grand Final.

A rover, he was let go by Collingwood during the 1968 VFL season and finished the year at St Kilda.

Wallis transferred to South Australian National Football League (SANFL) club West Adelaide in 1969, winning the club's Best & Fairest award in his first season with them and won the award for a second time in 1973.

His father, Tom Wallis, had played at Collingwood in the 1940s.
