= Tomkins Medal =

The Tomkins Medal (officially called the H. W. Tomkins Memorial Medal) was an Australian rules football honour awarded from 1939 to 2008 to the fairest and most brilliant player in the South Australian National Football League (SANFL) under-19 competition, as judged by field umpires. It was named after Horace W. (Dick) Tomkins, past League administrator, League life member, junior football ambassador and Secretary of the West Torrens Football Club. From 1936 to 1938, the award was known as the O'Halloran Medal.

== Winners ==
=== O'Halloran Medal ===
Year	Name	Club
1936	Jack Butler	Norwood (1)
1937	Allan Telfer	North Adelaide (1)
1938	Des Crawley	Sturt (1)

=== Tomkins Medal ===
Year	Name	Club
1939	Des Crawley	Sturt (2)
1940	Reg Hogben	North Adelaide (2)
1941	Allan Crabb	Glenelg (1)
1942-1944	No Award	
1945	Jim Deane	South Adelaide (1)
1946	Ken McGregor	West Adelaide (1)
1947	Ken McGregor	West Adelaide (2)
1948	Glyn Williams	West Adelaide (3)
1949	Ray Whitaker	Port Adelaide (1)
1950	Lloyd Weston	North Adelaide (3)
1951	Aldo Rosetto	West Adelaide (4)
1952	Neville Hayes	Port Adelaide (2)
1953	Vincent Copley	Port Adelaide (3)
1954	M. Meredith	Port Adelaide (4)
1955	B. Carr	South Adelaide (2)
1956	Jeff Bray	West Adelaide (5)
1957	Barry Potts	North Adelaide (4)
1958	G. Green	Sturt (3)
1959	Bob Simunsen	Woodville (1)
1960	Chris Hunt	Glenelg (2)
1961	Graeme Farrell	North Adelaide (5)
1962	Jon Burton	Norwood (2)
1963	Jon Burton	Norwood (3)
1964	Brian Woodcock	Norwood (4)
1965	Peter Bitmead	West Adelaide (6)
1966	Owen Vick	West Torrens (1)
1967	Neil Worthley	Glenelg (3)
1968	Robert Hooper	West Adelaide (7)
1969	John Payne	North Adelaide (6)
1970	Kym Stoddart	Central District (1)
1971	John Crouch	Port Adelaide (5)
1972	Neil Craig	Norwood (5)
1973	Wilbur Wilson	Central District (2)
1974	Wayne Hughes	Central District (3)
1975	Steven Carr	West Torrens (2)
1976	Wayne Slattery	South Adelaide (3)
1977	Leon Grosser	West Adelaide (8)
1978	Brenton Graham	Central District (4)
1979	Kim Klomp	Sturt (4)
1980	Duncan Fosdike	Norwood (6)
1981	Dean Renfrey	Norwood (7)
1982	Steve Goldsworthy	Norwood (8)
1983	Craig Dewhirst	South Adelaide (4)
1984	Gary Argus	Sturt (5)
1985	Jason Roe	Port Adelaide (6)
1986	Craig Griffiths	Central District (5)
1987	J. James	Sturt (6)
1988	Craig Vozzo	West Adelaide (9)
1989	Paul Hicks	Central District (6)
1990	Michael King	Norwood (9)
1991	Dale Betterman	Norwood (10)
1992	Adrian Rowett	Glenelg (4)
1993 tied	David Flesfader	Glenelg (5)
1993 tied	C. Voice	Port Adelaide (7)
1994	L. Bettis	South Adelaide (5)
1995	Damien King	Norwood (11)
1996	Dwayne Povey	Norwood (12)
1997	Adam O'Hara	Woodville-West Torrens (1)
1998	Matthew Krieg	Central District (7)
1999	Greg Chapman	Woodville-West Torrens (2)
2000	B. Wilcox	Port Adelaide Magpies (1)
2001	Adam Merrett	Glenelg (6)
2002	Tom Chadwick	West Adelaide (10)
2003	Lee Saunders	South Adelaide (6)
2004	Bradley Hunter	South Adelaide (7)
2005 tied	Blake Wegener	West Adelaide (11)
2005 tied	Glenn Dundovic	West Adelaide (12)
2006	Samuel McDonald	West Adelaide (13)
2007	Kieran Flanigan	Sturt (7)
2008	Shane Harris	Woodville-West Torrens (3)
