= Des Herbert =

Australian rules footballer

Personal information
- Full name: Desmond John Herbert
- Born: 15 March 1959 (age 67)
- Height: 183 cm (6 ft 0 in)
- Weight: 81 kg (179 lb)

Playing career^{1}
Years	Club	Games (Goals)
1980–1981	Collingwood	8 (5)
1981–1983	Fitzroy	14 (5)
Total		22 (10)
- ^{1} Playing statistics correct to the end of 1983.

Desmond John Herbert (born 15 March 1959) is a former Australian rules footballer who played with Collingwood and Fitzroy in the Victorian Football League (VFL).

Herbert, who had to make his way up through the thirds, was a member of the Collingwood team that lost the 1979 reserves grand final to North Melbourne.

In 1980 Herbert made five senior appearances, late in the season, but lost his place in the team before the finals. Herbert played a further three games in 1981 before being traded to Fitzroy mid-season, along with Leigh Carlson and Matthew McClelland, in return for Warwick Irwin.

Herbert's seven games for Fitzroy that year consisted of two finals, including their dramatic one-point loss to Collingwood in the semi-finals. After making only seven appearances over the next two seasons, Herbert joined reigning South Australian National Football League (SANFL) premiers West Adelaide in 1984 and won their Best and Fairest that year.

Herbert later returned to Victoria and played with Victorian Football Association (VFA) club Brunswick.
