= Anthony Banik =

Australian rules footballer

Personal information
- Born: 17 January 1973 (age 53)
- Original team: Won Wron Woodside
- Height: 180 cm (5 ft 11 in)
- Weight: 80 kg (176 lb)

Playing career^{1}
Years	Club	Games (Goals)
1990–1994	Richmond	49 (0)
- ^{1} Playing statistics correct to the end of 1994.

Career highlights
- First Draft Pick in the 1989 VFL draft; AFL debut with Richmond on 14 April 1990 v Hawthorn; Richmond Reserves Best & Fairest 1994; SANFL debut with West Adelaide on 18 March 1995; West Adelaide Best & Fairest 1995, 1997

Anthony Banik (born 17 January 1973) is a former Australian rules football player who played in the Australian Football League between 1990 and 1994 for the Richmond Football Club.

Banik went on to be player-coach for West Adelaide in the South Australian National Football League, then Sale, then led the DWWWW Allies to a Premiership in the Alberton Football Netball League in 2003.

== Career ==
Banik was the #1 pick in the 1989 VFL draft and made his AFL debut for Richmond in Round 3 of the 1990 season against the reigning premiers Hawthorn on 14 April at Princes Park. He collected 14 kicks, 2 handballs and 1 mark as the Tigers went down by 30 points, 10.21 (81) to 15.21 (111).

During his time at Richmond, Banik contracted chronic fatigue syndrome which limited his on-field availability. He recovered from the illness but was eventually delisted by the club following the 1994 season. He won the Richmond reserves best and fairest award in 1994.

Banik then moved to Adelaide to play for West Adelaide in the South Australian National Football League in 1995. He won their best & fairest award in his debut season with the club, and again in 1997.

He coached Gippsland Football League club Sale in 2000 and 2001.
