= Tom Wallis =

Australian rules footballer and coach

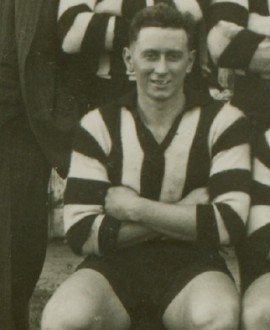
- Wallis during his Collingwood career

Personal information
- Full name: Thomas William Wallis
- Born: 4 July 1920; Corowa, New South Wales
- Died: 26 November 2001 (aged 81)
- Original team: Northcote
- Height: 175 cm (5 ft 9 in)
- Weight: 83 kg (183 lb)

Playing career^{1}
| Years | Club | Games (Goals) |
| 1942–1947 | Collingwood | 78 (2) |
- ^{1} Playing statistics correct to the end of 1947.

Thomas William Wallis (4 July 1920 – 26 November 2001) was an Australian rules footballer who played with Collingwood in the Victorian Football League (VFL).

Wallis played with Collingwood during World War II, then went back to his original club Northcote as captain-coach in 1945. He opted to return to Collingwod in May, in time to play in round eight. At the end of the year, he played in two finals and appeared in another three in 1946, but never made it to a grand final. He was a wingman and half back flanker.

Wallis later coached the Collingwood Under-19s side. His son, Gary Wallis, played for Collingwood and St Kilda.
