= Riley Milne =

Australian rules footballer (born 1990)

Personal information
- Full name: Riley Milne
- Born: 20 July 1990 (age 36)
- Original team: Murray Bushrangers (TAC Cup)
- Draft: No. 16, 2009 rookie draft
- Debut: Round 21, 2009, Hawthorn vs. Richmond, at Melbourne Cricket Ground
- Height: 193 cm (6 ft 4 in)
- Weight: 80 kg (176 lb)
- Position: Defender

Playing career^{1}
Years	Club	Games (Goals)
2009–2011	Hawthorn	3 (0)
- ^{1} Playing statistics correct to the end of 2011.

Riley Milne is an Australian rules footballer who played for the Hawthorn Football Club in the Australian Football League and for West Adelaide in the SANFL.

Milne was selected by the Hawks at pick 16 in the 2008 Rookie draft.

Played a key role as a defender in the Murray Bushrangers 2008 TAC Cup premiership team and represented Vic Country in the Under 18s competition.

Milne played in the last two games of Hawthorn's 2009 season.

In March 2011, Hawthorn promoted Milne to its senior list. After being delisted at the end of 2011, Milne signed to play for Glenelg in the SANFL for two years. In 2014 he crossed over to West Adelaide and played his last game on the interchange bench for the Bloods in the 2015 SANFL Grand Final clash with Woodville-West Torrens at the Adelaide Oval on 27 September.

== Statistics ==
Legend
G	Goals	K	Kicks	D	Disposals	T	Tackles
B	Behinds	H	Handballs	M	Marks

Season	Team	No.	Games	Totals							Averages (per game)							Votes
Season	Team	No.	Games	G	B	K	H	D	M	T	G	B	K	H	D	M	T	Votes
2009	Hawthorn	45	2	0	0	12	12	24	7	0	0.0	0.0	6.0	6.0	12.0	3.5	0.0	0
2010	Hawthorn	32	0	—	—	—	—	—	—	—	—	—	—	—	—	—	—	0
2011	Hawthorn	32	1	0	0	2	2	4	1	2	0.0	0.0	2.0	2.0	4.0	1.0	2.0	0
Career			3	0	0	14	14	28	8	2	0.0	0.0	4.7	4.7	9.3	2.7	0.7	0
