= Ryan Ferguson (footballer) =

Australian rules footballer (born 1981)

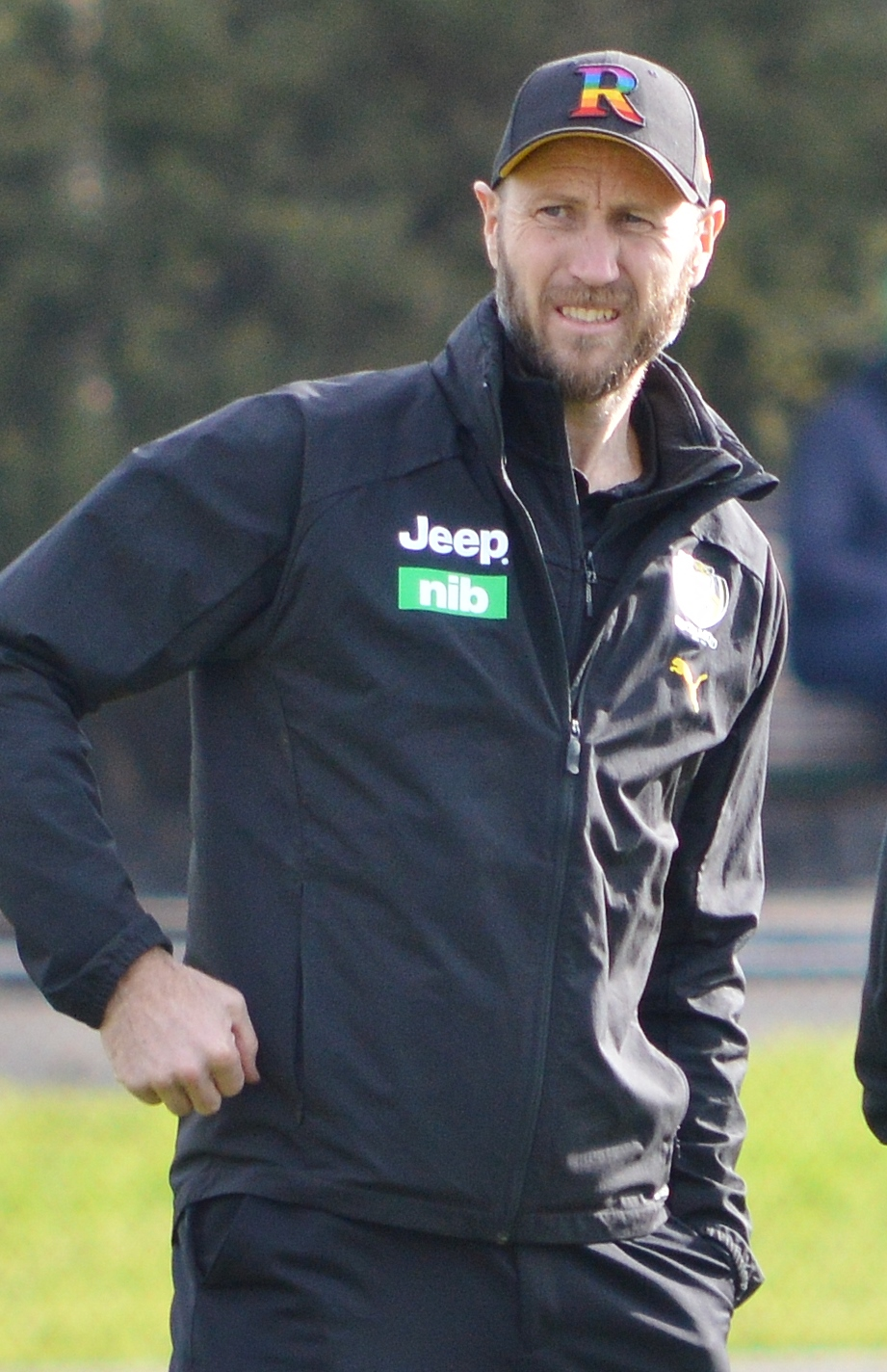
- Ferguson as Richmond VFL assistant coach in July 2022

Personal information
- Born: 29 September 1981 (age 45)
- Original teams: Belgrave Football Club, Frankston
- Debut: Round 1, 2003, Melbourne vs. Hawthorn, at MCG
- Height: 197 cm (6 ft 6 in)
- Weight: 91 kg (201 lb)
- Position: Tall defender

Playing career^{1}
Years	Club	Games (Goals)
2003–2007	Melbourne	47 (6)

Coaching career^{3}
Years	Club	Games (W–L–D)
2021-2025	Richmond (W)	65 (26–37–2)
- ^{1} Playing statistics correct to the end of 2013.^{3} Coaching statistics correct as of end of 2025 season.

Career highlights
- Harold Ball Memorial Trophy: 2003; West Adelaide Best & Fairest 2008, 2009, 2012, 2013; West Adelaide Club Captain 2009–2013; Fos Williams Medallist 2013

Ryan Ferguson (born 29 September 1981) is an Australian rules football coach and former player. He currently serves as head coach of the Richmond Football Club in the AFL Women's competition (AFLW). Ferguson played 47 AFL matches over five years at the Melbourne Football Club between 2003 and 2007, before a long state league career that included captaining West Adelaide in the South Australian National Football League (SANFL) and winning the club's best and fairest award on four occasions. He joined Richmond as a development coach in 2015 and was appointed the club's AFLW head coach ahead of the 2021 season.

== AFL playing career ==
=== Melbourne (2003-2007) ===
Recruited from Victorian Football League (VFL) club Frankston Dolphins in the 2002 National Draft (fifth round selection; number 66 overall), Ferguson was a good contributor to the Demons as a tall defender and fill in ruckman. In 2003, Ferguson was listed as one of 28 players to have started his career in the VFL/VFA prior to his AFL Career.

Ferguson's debut season, 2003, saw him play 17 matches and kick one goal. For his efforts Ferguson was awarded the Harold Ball Memorial Trophy as the Demons' best first year player. After missing the entire 2004 AFL season through injury, Ferguson had his best season in 2005 playing 19 games including the Elimination final against Geelong. Both 2006 and 2007 were forgettable for the 6'6" (197 cm) defender as injuries restricted him to just three games in 2006 and five games in 2007.

In October 2007 Ferguson was delisted by Melbourne after playing 47 games and kicking six goals in his five seasons at the club.

== State league playing career ==
=== SANFL ===
Ferguson then moved to Adelaide to play with West Adelaide in the SANFL. He was named club captain in 2009 (still held as of the 2013 SANFL season) and has so far played 108 games and kicked 36 goals for the Bloods. Fergie was also a popular winner of the clubs best and fairest award, the Steve Hamra Medal, in 2008, 2009, 2012, and 2013.

Ferguson was West Adelaide's captain when they were defeated by the Norwood Football Club in the 2012 SANFL Grand Final. In the end Norwood ran out 49 point winners with a score of 12.7 (79) to Wests 3.12 (30) in front of 29,661 fans at AAMI Stadium.

West Adelaide's strong start to the 2013 season, where for the first time in many years they kicked over 100 points in three consecutive games (including a 106-point win over South Adelaide at Hickinbotham Oval in Round 3), has seen Ferguson one of five Bloods players selected to the South Australian training squad for the state game against the North East Australian Football League (NEAFL North) to be played at West's home ground, City Mazda Stadium, on 11 May 2013.

Ferguson, selected on the half-back flank for the game, played a vital role in defence for the Croweaters, with his second quarter efforts turning away many a NEAFL attacking raid with his strong marking, good positional play and precision kicking. He would go on to win the Fos Williams Medal as the best player on the ground in South Australia's 21.14 (140) to 9.4 (58) win over the NEAFL North.

=== VFL ===
Ferguson left West Adelaide at the end of the 2013 SANFL season. The Bloods had finished third, while Ferguson co-won the clubs Best & Fairest with Chris Schmidt. He has subsequently returned to Melbourne and has signed to play with VFL club Williamstown.

== Coaching career ==
In 2015 Ferguson joined Richmond as development coach and VFL line coach.

In November 2020, Ferguson was appointed head coach of Richmond's AFLW team for the 2021 season.
