= 2015 SANFL Grand Final =

Woodville-West Torrens	West Adelaide
7.6 (48)	11.12 (78)
	1	2	3	4
WWT	2.0 (12)	5.3 (33)	7.5 (47)	7.6 (48)
WA	4.1 (25)	6.5 (41)	9.8 (62)	11.12 (78)
- Date: Sunday, 27 September
- Stadium: Adelaide Oval
- Attendance: 25,625
- Umpires: Haussen, Medlin, Fleer
- Coin toss won by: Woodville-West Torrens
- Kicked toward: Cathedral (northern)

Ceremonies
- Pre-match entertainment: You Am I
- National anthem: Ellie Lovegrove and Nancy Bates

Accolades
- Best on Ground: Chris Schmidt (West Adelaide)

Broadcast in Australia
- Network: Seven Network
- Commentators: John Casey, Mark Soderstrom, Tim Ginever, Tom Wilson

The 2015 South Australian National Football League (SANFL) grand final was played at the Adelaide Oval on Sunday, 27 September 2015, to determine the 2015 SANFL premiership team.

== Teams ==
The Grand Final was contested by the 2015 minor premiers Woodville-West Torrens and West Adelaide. This was the first time the two teams have played each other in the SANFL Grand Final. West Adelaide defeated the premiership favourites Woodville-West Torrens by 30 points to claim their ninth premiership overall and first since 1983 (thirty-two years, the second-longest premiership drought in SANFL history).

Woodville-West Torrens won their way into the club's 9th Grand Final after defeating West Adelaide 11.13 (79) to 9.11 (65) in the Second Semi-final. A week later, West Adelaide defeated Central District 15.8 (98) to 6.9 (45) in the Preliminary Final to advance to the club's 18th SANFL Grand Final.

== Entertainment ==
Australian alternative rock band You Am I provided the pre-game entertainment. You Am I lead singer-songwriter-guitarist Tim Rogers spent time growing up in Adelaide and attended over 600 SANFL games as a supporter of Sturt.

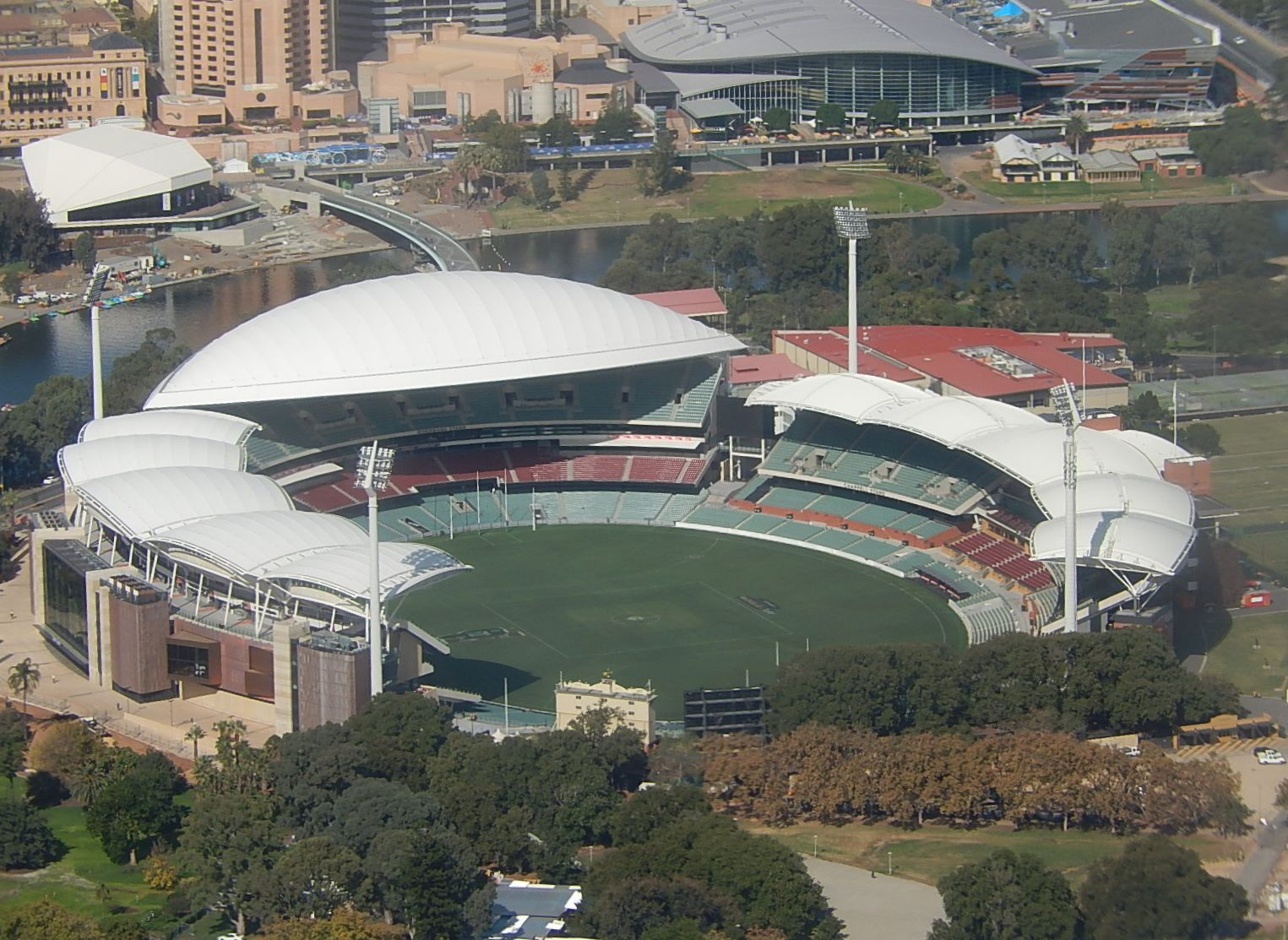
Adelaide Oval, host venue of the 2015 SANFL Grand Final

== Team Lists ==
The two teams named to play in the Grand Final are as follows.

Woodville West Torrens
B:	Patrick Giuffreda	Jake von Bertouch	Phil Raymond
HB:	Luke Jarrad	Luke Thompson (c)	Matthew Goldsworthy
C:	Sam Martyn	Scott Lewis	Jarred Allmond
HF:	Jared Petrenko	Andrew Ainger	Lachlan McGregor
F:	Chris Hall	Michael Wundke	Joe Sinor
Foll:	Fraser Thurlow	Tom Schwarz	James Boyd
Int:	Tom Whittlesea	Nick Hayes	Giles Ellis
Int:	Nathan Batley	Matthew Appleton	
Coach:	Michael Godden		

- Scott Lewis played his 150th SANFL game after debuting for West Adelaide in 2005.

West Adelaide
B:	Daniel Caire (vc)	Tom Keough	Brad Helbig
HB:	Jason Porplyzia	Adam Hartlett	Errin Wasley-Black
C:	Taite Silverlock	Kaine Stevens	Josh Schiller
HF:	Shannon Green	Travis Tuck	Jonathan Beech
F:	Hugh Haysman	Logan Hill	Aaron Fielke
Foll:	Daniel Webb	Chris Schmidt (c)	Will Snelling
Int:	Ryan Willits	Mason Middleton	Riley Milne
Int:	Nick Homburg	Aaron Anderson	
Coach:	Mark Mickan		

- Daniel Webb played his 100th SANFL game since debuting for West Adelaide in 2009

== Scorecard ==
2015 SANFL Grand Final
Sunday 27 September (2:10 pm)	Woodville-West Torrens	def. by	West Adelaide	Adelaide Oval (crowd: 25,625)	Report
2.0 (12); 5.3 (33); 7.5 (47); 7.6 (48)	Q1; Q2; Q3; Final	4.1 (25); 6.5 (41); 9.8 (62); 11.12 (78)	Umpires: Haussen, Medlin, Fleer; Jack Oatey Medal: Chris Schmidt (West Adelaide); Television broadcast: Seven Network
4: Wundke; 2: Ainger; 1: Petrenko	Goals	3: Green; 2: Beech, Webb; 1: Wasley-Black, Tuck, Fielke, Stevens
Wundke, Schwarz, Jarrad	Best	Schmidt, Porplyzia, Stevens, Schiller, Tuck, Helbig, Hartlett, Green
This was West Adelaide's first premiership since 1983.

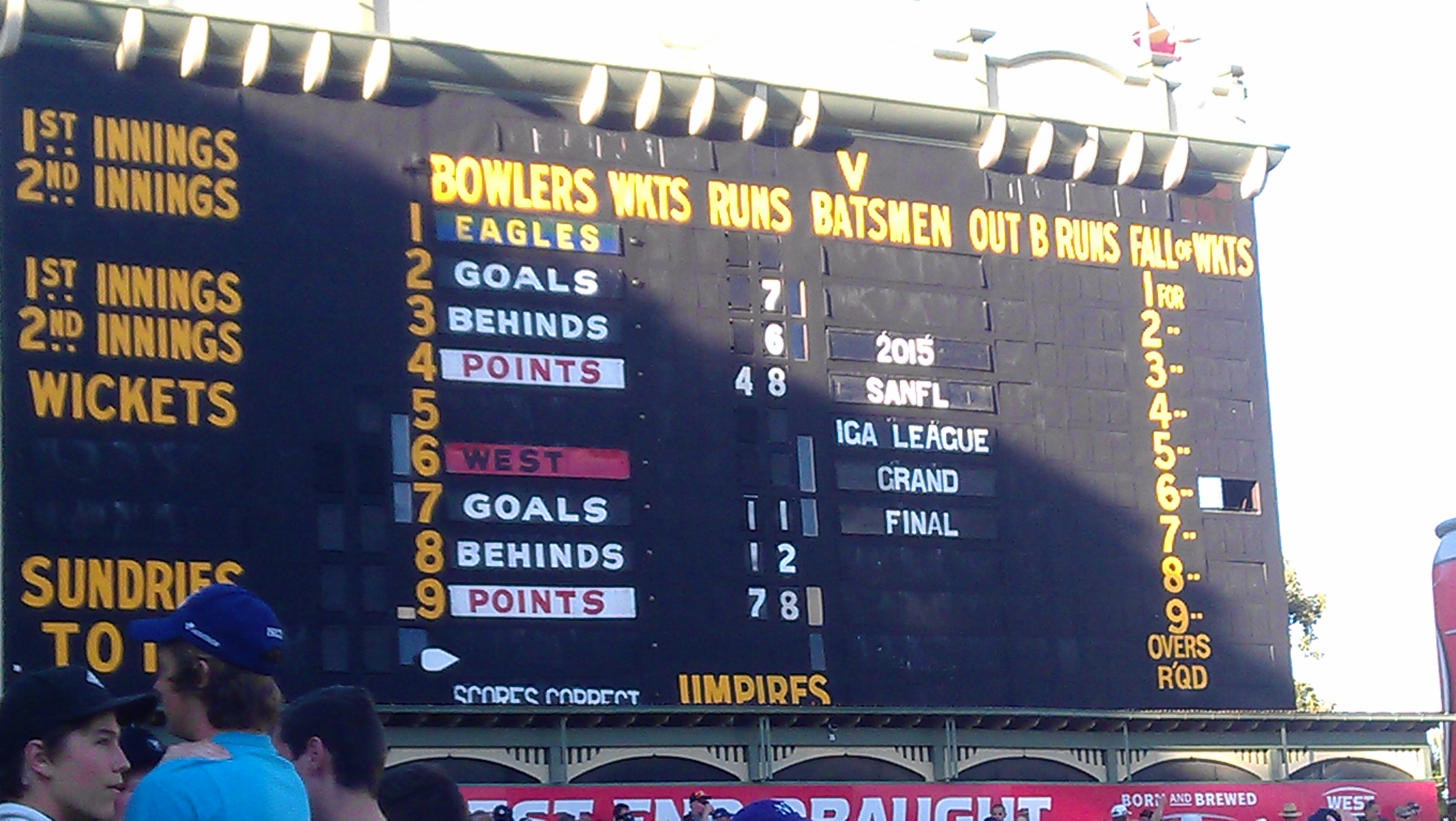
Adelaide Oval's famous scoreboard at the end of the game

== Form ==
Head to head - WWT 42 / WA 25 / Draw 1

Last three encounters:
2015 Rnd 2: WA 15.5 (95) d WWT 14.5 (89)
2015 Rnd 12: WWT 14.4 (88) d WA 10.13 (73)
2015 2nd SF: WWT 11.13 (79) d WA 9.11 (65)
