= Brad Helbig =

Australian rules footballer (born 1992)

Personal information
- Full name: Bradley Helbig
- Born: 28 February 1992 (age 34)
- Original team: Waikerie/West Adelaide
- Draft: 47th overall, 2010; Richmond
- Height: 186 cm (6 ft 1 in)
- Weight: 85 kg (187 lb)

Playing career^{1}
Years	Club	Games (Goals)
2011–2014	Richmond	16 (4)
- ^{1} Playing statistics correct to the end of 2014.

Bradley Helbig (born 28 February 1992) is an Australian rules footballer who played for the Richmond Football Club in the Australian Football League (AFL).

Originally from the West Adelaide Football Club in the South Australian National Football League (SANFL), Helbig was drafted to Richmond with their third selection, the forty-seventh overall, in the 2010 AFL draft.

Helbig made his AFL debut in Round 1, 2011 against Carlton at the MCG. In July 2011 he extended his contract until the end of the 2013 season.

Helbig was delisted by Richmond at the conclusion of the 2014 season He then returned to play for West Adelaide in 2015 and was named in the back pocket in the Bloods 2015 SANFL Grand Final team for their game against Woodville-West Torrens at the Adelaide Oval on 27 September.
