= Jeff Bray (footballer) =

Australian rules footballer (1938–2006)

Personal information
- Full name: Jeffrey Phillip Bray
- Born: 19 May 1938
- Died: 24 May 2006 (aged 68)
- Height: 184 cm (6 ft 0 in)
- Weight: 91 kg (201 lb)
- Position: Centre half back

Playing career^{1}
Years	Club	Games (Goals)
1956–63, 1967–70	West Adelaide (SANFL)	196 (83)
1964–66	South Melbourne (VFL)	34 (2)
Total		230 (85)
- ^{1} Playing statistics correct to the end of 1970.

Career highlights
- SANFL debut with West Adelaide on 1 September 1956; SANFL Tomkins Medallist (Under 19) 1956; West Adelaide Sam Suckling Medallist 1957 (best first year player); West Adelaide Best & Fairest 1960, 1963; The Advertiser Team of the Year 1960, 1961, 1963; West Adelaide Premiership Player 1961; The Advertiser Player of the Year 1963; VFL debut with South Melbourne on 16 May 1964 v Geelong at Lake Oval; 8 State games for South Australia (1960–63); SANFL Player Life Member 1971; West Adelaide Football Club Player Life Member; West Adelaide Football Club Hall of Fame Inaugural Inductee 2005; South Australian Football Hall of Fame Inductee 2007

Jeff Bray (19 May 1938 – 24 May 2006) was an Australian rules footballer who played for West Adelaide in the South Australian National Football League and South Melbourne in the Victorian Football League.

== Biography ==
Bray, a solidly built centre half back, won West Adelaide's Best & Fairest award in 1960 and 1963. In the second of those two years he was also 'The Advertiser Player of the Year' and represented South Australia, for one of eight times during his career, to a rare win over rivals Victoria at the Melbourne Cricket Ground (The Croweaters first win over the Big V in Melbourne for 37 years). He was also member of West Adelaide's 1961 premiership team.

He had a three-year stint at South Melbourne in the 1960s but his appearances were restricted through injury.

Bray was an inaugural inductee into the West Adelaide Hall of Fame in 2005. In 2006 Bray died from amyloidosis brought on by heart complications and the following year was inducted into the South Australian Football Hall of Fame.
