= Chris Schmidt (footballer) =

Australian rules footballer (born 1989)

Personal information
- Full name: Chris Schmidt
- Born: 20 March 1989 (age 37); South Australia, Australia
- Original team: West Adelaide (SANFL)
- Draft: 34th overall, 2006; Brisbane Lions
- Height: 189 cm (6 ft 2 in)
- Weight: 82 kg (181 lb)
- Position: Midfield

Club information
- Current club: West Adelaide

Playing career^{1}
Years	Club	Games (Goals)
2006–2009	Brisbane Lions	2 (0)
2010–2011	Adelaide	18 (2)
Total		20 (2)
- ^{1} Playing statistics correct to the end of 2011.

Career highlights
- West Adelaide Best & Fairest 2013, 2016; West Adelaide Premiership captain 2015; SANFL Jack Oatey Medallist 2015

Chris Schmidt (born 20 March 1989) is a former professional Australian rules footballer who played for the Brisbane Lions and Adelaide Football Club in the Australian Football League (AFL). He then played for South Australian National Football League (SANFL) club West Adelaide, the club he was originally drafted from.

== Brisbane Lions career ==
He was drafted by Brisbane Lions with the 34th selection in the 2006 AFL draft from West Adelaide in the SANFL. Debuting for Brisbane in Round 10, 2007 as an 18-year-old against Richmond, Schmidt struggled with just 1 kick and 5 handballs. The match ended in a draw. Schmidt played only one more game for the club, the following round against the Western Bulldogs, and only managed three disposals. His Lions career was riddled with injuries, including osteitis pubis and a persistent shoulder problem. Schmidt played most of his footy with the Suncoast Lions during this period. He was delisted at the end of the 2008 season.

== Adelaide career ==
Schmidt returned to South Australia when he was drafted at number 26 in the 2009 Rookie Draft by Adelaide. He played senior football for his previous club, West Adelaide, before being elevated from the Crows rookie list due to long term injury for Brodie Martin.

He made his Adelaide debut in the Round 3 loss to Melbourne, and picked up 20 disposals, showing his improvement from his Lions days.

Schmidt was delisted by Adelaide at the end of the 2011 AFL season.

== West Adelaide career ==
He returned to the SANFL in 2012, again playing for West Adelaide.

In the 2013 Foxtel Cup Grand Final, Schmidt collected 26 disposals and nine clearances, at 81 per cent disposal efficiency. He was awarded the Coles Medal, as the player best on ground.

New West Adelaide senior coach Mark Mickan, himself a former player for both the Crows and West Adelaide where he is part of the Bloods Hall of Fame, appointed Schmidt as West Adelaide's new club captain for 2014 following the retirement of Ryan Ferguson.

After a disappointing 2014 SANFL season in which The Bloods slumped to 9th place (second last) on the ladder, Westies bounced back in 2015 to finish the minor round in 3rd place. Schmidt then led the club to its first SANFL premiership since 1983 with a dominant display in the 2015 SANFL Grand Final, amassing 44 disposals for the game (the most be any SANFL player in 2015) and winning the Jack Oatey Medal as the best player in the Grand Final as Westies defeated minor premiers Woodville-West Torrens by 30 points at the Adelaide Oval. Schmidt joins Bernie Leahy (1908, 1909), Jos Dailey (1911, 1912), Bruce McGregor (1927), Johnny Taylor (1947), Neil Kerley (1961) and Ian Borchard (1983) as a West Adelaide premiership winning captains.
