= Garth Burkett =

Australian rules footballer

Personal information
- Full name: Garth Burkett
- Born: 21 March 1927; Keswick, South Australia
- Died: 3 August 2012 (aged 85)
- Original team: West Colts
- Position: Centre

Playing career^{1}
Years	Club	Games (Goals)
1944	West Adelaide-Glenelg	
1945-1954	West Adelaide	
Total		92 (11)

Representative team honours
Years	Team	Games (Goals)
1947, 1954	South Australia	4 (?)
1949-50	New South Wales	3 (?)
- ^{1} Playing statistics correct to the end of 1954.

Career highlights
- West Adelaide Best and Fairest 1945, 1946; West Adelaide Premiership 1947; West Broken Hill Premiership 1949; Middleton Medal (BHFL) 1949; West Broken Hill Best and Fairest 1949, 1950, 1951; New South Wales Vice-Captain 1950 (Brisbane Carnival); Stansbury Premiership 1953; Myponga Premiership 1957

Garth "Gar" Burkett (21 March 1927 – 3 August 2012) was an Australian rules footballer who played for West Adelaide in the South Australian National Football League (SANFL) between 1944 and 1954.

Burkett shifted around a number of clubs over his career. Part-way through the 1944 season with West Colts, he shifted to Kelvinator in the South Australian Amateur Football League. He then joined the West Adelaide-Glenelg combined team for the final two games of the season, remaining with West Adelaide in 1945 and cementing his spot in the league team with back-to-back Best and Fairests (1945-46), and representing South Australia at the 1947 Hobart Carnival.

In 1949, Burkett was appointed Captain-Coach of West Broken Hill in the Broken Hill Football League, a position he held for three seasons, leading them to the premiership in 1949 and winning the Broken Hill League's Middleton Medal the same year. In each of the three seasons, Burkett won the West Broken Hill Best and Fairest, and represented the Broken Hill Football League, and New South Wales on multiple occasions, including the 1950 Brisbane Carnival.

In 1952, Burkett returned to South Australia and joined the Stansbury Football Club, who later that season were involved in controversy when they played an unapproved game against a combined Yorke Peninsula Football Association team in Moonta, South Australia, resulting in the club being suspended for the remainder of the Southern Yorke Peninsula Football Association season.

Burkett returned to West Adelaide in 1954 and once again represented South Australia. In 1956, Burkett was appointed Captain-Coach of the Myponga Football Club, leading them to the Southern Football Association premiership in 1957.
