= 2015 SANFL season =

- Teams: 10
- Premiers: West Adelaide; 9th premiership
- Minor premiers: Woodville-West Torrens; 5th minor premiership
- Magarey Medallist: Joel Cross; South Adelaide (25 votes)
- Ken Farmer Medallist: Clint Alleway; Glenelg (47 goals)

Attendance
- Matches played: 96
- Total attendance: 238,683 (2,486 per match)
- Highest: 25,625 (Grand Final, Woodville-West Torrens vs. West Adelaide)

The 2015 South Australian National Football League season (officially the SANFL IGA League) was the 136th season (Note: Although 2015 marks the 140th year since 1877 (including 1877 as a counted year and being the first year of competition in the SANFL), the 2015 season was the 133rd since 1877 due to 6 cancelled seasons in 1916-1918 and 1942-1944 due to World Wars I and II. See List of SANFL premiers for confirmation.) of the South Australian National Football League (SANFL) Australian rules football competition.

The season commenced on Thursday 2 April 2015 with reigning premiers Norwood meeting Sturt at Norwood Oval, and concluded on Sunday 27 September 2015 with the SANFL Grand Final at Adelaide Oval with West Adelaide defeating Woodville-West Torrens by 30 points to claim their ninth premiership and first in thirty-two years.

== Premiership season ==
Highlights of the season fixture include:

- A 19-round home and away competition, in which each team plays each other twice
- A Grand Final rematch, featuring arch rivals Norwood and Port Adelaide, to be played under lights on Friday 24 April at Adelaide Oval. Glenelg will host Adelaide on the same night at Glenelg Oval.
- At least one match to be played in regional South Australia with Adelaide tackling Port Adelaide at Balaklava Oval in Round 7, Sunday 17 May. West Adelaide could host Port Adelaide in the Riverland on Saturday 13 June (Round 10), which is still to be confirmed.

=== Round 1 ===
| | Round 1 |
| Thursday 2 April (7:40 pm) | Norwood 13.6 (84) | def. | Sturt 9.11 (65) | Norwood Oval (crowd: 6,927) |
| Friday 3 April (3:10 pm) | Glenelg 12.5 (77) | def. by | South Adelaide 14.13 (97) | Glenelg Oval (crowd: 5,221) |
Byes: Central District, North Adelaide, Port Adelaide, West Adelaide, Woodville-West Torrens, Adelaide

=== Round 2 ===
| | Round 2 |
| Friday 10 April (7:10 pm) | South Adelaide 6.5 (41) | def. by | Port Adelaide 16.11 (107) | Hickinbotham Oval (crowd: 1,683) |
| Saturday 11 April (1:10 pm) | Sturt 16.14 (110) | def. | Glenelg 13.4 (82) | Unley Oval (crowd: 2,717) |
| Saturday 11 April (1:10 pm) | North Adelaide 13.12 (90) | def. | Adelaide 12.15 (87) | Prospect Oval (crowd: 2,465) |
| Saturday 11 April (2:10 pm) | Central District 7.5 (47) | def. by | Norwood 11.5 (71) | Elizabeth Oval (crowd: 2,665) |
| Saturday 11 April (2:10 pm) | Woodville-West Torrens 14.5 (89) | def. by | West Adelaide 15.5 (95) | Woodville Oval (crowd: 1,985) |

=== Round 3 ===
| | Round 3 |
| Friday 17 April (7:10 pm) | Glenelg 9.11 (65) | def. by | Central District 11.14 (80) | Glenelg Oval (crowd: 2,667) |
| Friday 17 April (7:10 pm) | West Adelaide 15.13 (103) | def. | Adelaide 11.8 (74) | Richmond Oval (crowd: 1,875) |
| Saturday 18 April (12:10 pm) | Port Adelaide 15.15 (105) | def. | North Adelaide 10.9 (69) | Alberton Oval (crowd: 1,878) |
| Sunday 19 April (2:10 pm) | Woodville-West Torrens 17.11 (113) | def. | Norwood 3.14 (32) | Woodville Oval (crowd: 2,855) |
| Sunday 19 April (2:10 pm) | South Adelaide 13.8 (86) | def. | Sturt 9.8 (62) | Hickinbotham Oval (crowd: 2,073) |

=== Round 4 ===
| | Round 4 |
| Friday 24 April (7:10 pm) | Glenelg 7.9 (51) | drew with | Adelaide 7.9 (51) | Glenelg Oval (crowd: 2,131) |
| Friday 24 April (7:10 pm) | Port Adelaide 5.5 (35) | def. by | Norwood 7.14 (56) | Adelaide Oval (crowd: 5,526) |
| Saturday 25 April (2:10 pm) | Central District 10.8 (68) | def. by | Woodville-West Torrens 17.6 (108) | Elizabeth Oval (crowd: 2,062) |
| Sunday 26 April (2:10 pm) | North Adelaide 8.1 (49) | def. by | South Adelaide 9.11 (65) | Prospect Oval (crowd: 2,223) |
| Sunday 26 April (2:10 pm) | Sturt 13.5 (83) | def. | West Adelaide 8.9 (57) | Unley Oval (crowd: 2,968) |
The match between Glenelg and Adelaide was abandoned after 13 minutes of the final quarter due to a power failure which left the ground in darkness after the floodlights went off. Because the match was abandoned during the second half, the progress score at the time of the power failure – 7.9 (51) apiece – was taken as the final score of the match.

=== Round 5 ===
| | Round 5 |
| Friday 1 May (7:40 pm) | Norwood 16.16 (112) | def. | Glenelg 10.7 (67) | Norwood Oval (crowd: 3,234) |
| Saturday 2 May (2:10 pm) | Port Adelaide 6.8 (44) | def. by | Woodville-West Torrens 9.7 (61) | Alberton Oval (crowd: 2,571) |
| Saturday 2 May (2:10 pm) | Sturt 22.10 (142) | def. | North Adelaide 12.8 (80) | Unley Oval (crowd: 3,029) |
| Sunday 3 May (11:30 am) | South Adelaide 13.12 (90) | def. | Adelaide 11.10 (76) | Hickinbotham Oval (crowd: 1,372 (Note: Note: this figure is unofficial. For a greater explanation see here)) |
| Sunday 3 May (1:10 pm) | West Adelaide 13.17 (95) | def. | Central District 9.7 (61) | Richmond Oval (crowd: 1,473) |
The match between South Adelaide and Adelaide, originally scheduled for Saturday 2 May at 7.10pm, was postponed to Sunday 3 May at 11.30am, after the lights at Hickinbotham Oval blacked out prior to the start of the match and were unable to be fixed. It was the second time in as many weeks that a match involving Adelaide was interrupted by faulty lights.

=== Round 6 ===
| | Round 6 |
| Friday 8 May (7:40 pm) | Norwood 12.15 (87) | def. | Adelaide 6.9 (45) | Norwood Oval (crowd: 3,025) |
| Saturday 9 May (2:10 pm) | Woodville-West Torrens 12.13 (85) | def. | Glenelg 9.8 (62) | Woodville Oval (crowd: 1,429) |
| Saturday 9 May (2:10 pm) | Central District 8.1 (49) | drew with | South Adelaide 7.7 (49) | Elizabeth Oval (crowd: 1,342) |
| Saturday 9 May (2:10 pm) | Port Adelaide 10.15 (75) | def. | Sturt 11.1 (67) | Alberton Oval (crowd: 2,038) |
| Saturday 9 May (2:10 pm) | West Adelaide 19.12 (126) | def. | North Adelaide 7.6 (48) | Richmond Oval (crowd: 1,588) |

=== Round 7 ===
| | Round 7 |
| Friday 15 May (7:10 pm) | Norwood 11.13 (79) | def. | South Adelaide 9.8 (62) | Norwood Oval (crowd: 3,017) |
| Sunday 17 May (1:10 pm) | Adelaide 15.9 (99) | def. by | Port Adelaide 20.14 (134) | Balaklava Oval (crowd: 2,034) |
| Sunday 17 May (2:10 pm) | Glenelg 11.11 (77) | def. by | West Adelaide 30.9 (189) | Glenelg Oval (crowd: 2,665) |
| Sunday 17 May (2:10 pm) | North Adelaide 7.13 (55) | def. by | Woodville-West Torrens 15.9 (99) | Prospect Oval (crowd: 2,162) |
| Sunday 17 May (2:10 pm) | Sturt 16.11 (107) | def. | Central District 14.9 (93) | Unley Oval (crowd: 3,177) |

=== State Game ===
| | 2015 State Game |
| Saturday 23 May (2:10 pm) | WAFL 18.13 (121) | def. | SANFL 11.11 (77) | Lathlain Park | Report |
Fos Williams Medal (SANFL): Tom Keough (West Adelaide); Simpson Medal (WAFL): Ryan Davis (Swan Districts)

=== Round 8 ===
| | Round 8 |
| Friday 29 May (7:10 pm) | West Adelaide 7.11 (53) | def. | South Adelaide 7.10 (52) | Richmond Oval (crowd: 1,877) |
| Saturday 30 May (1:10 pm) | Central District 11.7 (73) | def. | Adelaide 8.5 (53) | Elizabeth Oval (crowd: 1,873) |
| Saturday 30 May (1:10 pm) | North Adelaide 10.4 (64) | def. by | Norwood 9.16 (70) | Prospect Oval (crowd: 2,635) |
| Sunday 31 May (2:10 pm) | Woodville-West Torrens 6.7 (43) | def. | Sturt 3.8 (26) | Woodville Oval (crowd: 2,832) |
| Sunday 31 May (2:10 pm) | Port Adelaide 13.5 (83) | def. | Glenelg 11.9 (75) | Alberton Oval (crowd: 1,819) |

=== Round 9 ===
| | Round 9 |
| Saturday 6 June (2:10 pm) | Central District 11.11 (77) | def. by | Port Adelaide 13.7 (85) | Elizabeth Oval (crowd: 2,433) |
| Sunday 7 June (2:10 pm) | Norwood 11.9 (75) | def. | West Adelaide 10.9 (69) | Norwood Oval (crowd: 3,985) |
| Sunday 7 June (2:10 pm) | Sturt 14.7 (91) | def. by | Adelaide 22.8 (140) | Unley Oval (crowd: 3,569) |
| Monday 8 June (2:10 pm) | Glenelg 14.10 (94) | def. | North Adelaide 8.11 (59) | Glenelg Oval (crowd: 3,409) |
| Monday 8 June (2:10 pm) | South Adelaide 4.10 (34) | def. by | Woodville-West Torrens 9.9 (63) | Hickinbotham Oval (crowd: 2,173) |

=== Round 10 ===
| | Round 10 |
| Saturday 13 June (2:10 pm) | West Adelaide 5.7 (37) | def. by | Port Adelaide 13.9 (87) | Richmond Oval (crowd: 2,159) |
| Sunday 14 June (2:10 pm) | Sturt 8.9 (57) | def. by | Norwood 12.7 (79) | Unley Oval (crowd: 3,995) |
| Sunday 14 June (2:10 pm) | South Adelaide 13.5 (83) | def. | Glenelg 9.9 (63) | Hickinbotham Oval (crowd: 1,862) |
| Saturday 20 June (2:10 pm) | Central District 18.17 (125) | def. | North Adelaide 4.2 (26) | Elizabeth Oval (crowd: 2,250) |
| Saturday 20 June (2:10 pm) | Woodville-West Torrens 14.11 (95) | def. | Adelaide 12.10 (82) | Woodville Oval (crowd: 2,265) |

=== Round 11 ===
| | Round 11 |
| Saturday 27 June (2:10 pm) | Woodville-West Torrens 13.7 (85) | def. | Central District 8.5 (53) | Woodville Oval (crowd: 2,020) |
| Saturday 27 June (2:10 pm) | North Adelaide 8.8 (56) | def. by | West Adelaide 21.6 (132) | Prospect Oval (crowd: 1,963) |
| Saturday 27 June (2:10 pm) | Sturt 6.6 (42) | def. by | South Adelaide 11.15 (81) | Unley Oval (crowd: 2,573) |
| Sunday 28 June (2:10 pm) | Glenelg 15.14 (104) | def. | Norwood 14.11 (95) | Glenelg Oval (crowd: 3,640) |
| Sunday 28 June (2:10 pm) | Port Adelaide 10.9 (69) | def. by | Adelaide 13.11 (89) | Alberton Oval (crowd: 4,864) |

=== Round 12 ===
| | Round 12 |
| Saturday 4 July (2:10 pm) | Glenelg 16.6 (102) | def. | Sturt 15.7 (97) | Glenelg Oval (crowd: 3,332) |
| Saturday 4 July (2:10 pm) | Norwood 8.10 (58) | def. by | Central District 12.10 (82) | Norwood Oval (crowd: 3,290) |
| Saturday 4 July (2:10 pm) | West Adelaide 10.13 (73) | def. by | Woodville-West Torrens 14.4 (88) | Richmond Oval (crowd: 3,639) |
Matches which were to have been played between North Adelaide and Port Adelaide and between South Adelaide and Adelaide were both postponed from 4 July by request of the two AFL clubs, following the death of Adelaide AFL coach Phil Walsh on 3 July. The matches were moved into the Round 17 split round.

=== Round 13 ===
| | Round 13 |
| Saturday 11 July (2:10 pm) | Central District 12.4 (76) | def. | Adelaide 6.5 (41) | Elizabeth Oval (crowd: 1,430) |
| Saturday 11 July (2:10 pm) | Sturt 5.8 (38) | def. by | Woodville-West Torrens 8.8 (56) | Unley Oval (crowd: 1,542) |
| Saturday 11 July (2:10 pm) | West Adelaide 14.12 (96) | def. | Glenelg 9.4 (58) | Richmond Oval (crowd: 1,270) |
| Saturday 11 July (2:10 pm) | Norwood 6.10 (46) | def. | Port Adelaide 6.9 (45) | Norwood Oval (crowd: 2,163) |
| Sunday 12 July (2:10 pm) | South Adelaide 13.8 (86) | def. | North Adelaide 2.9 (21) | Hickinbotham Oval (crowd: 1,198) |

=== Round 14 ===
| | Round 14 |
| Saturday 18 July (2:10 pm) | Central District 10.7 (67) | def. by | West Adelaide 11.12 (78) | Elizabeth Oval (crowd: 1,868) |
| Saturday 18 July (2:10 pm) | Woodville-West Torrens 7.13 (55) | def. by | Port Adelaide 14.12 (96) | Woodville Oval (crowd: 2,272) |
| Saturday 18 July (2:10 pm) | North Adelaide 8.11 (59) | def. by | Adelaide 25.10 (160) | Prospect Oval (crowd: 1,927) |
Byes: Glenelg, Norwood, South Adelaide, Sturt

=== Round 15 ===
| | Round 15 |
| Sunday 26 July (2:10 pm) | Glenelg 9.3 (57) | def. by | Woodville-West Torrens 15.11 (101) | Glenelg Oval (crowd: 2,581) |
| Sunday 26 July (2:10 pm) | North Adelaide 8.15 (63) | def. by | Central District 11.8 (74) | Prospect Oval (crowd: 1,821) |
| Sunday 26 July (2:10 pm) | Norwood 10.3 (63) | def. by | South Adelaide 9.10 (64) | Noarlunga Oval (crowd: 1,700) |
| Sunday 26 July (2:10 pm) | Sturt 10.9 (69) | def. | Port Adelaide 6.6 (42) | Unley Oval (crowd: 2,440) |
| Sunday 26 July (2:10 pm) | West Adelaide 9.4 (58) | def. by | Adelaide 18.13 (121) | Richmond Oval (crowd: 1,406) |

=== Round 16 ===
| | Round 16 |
| Saturday 1 August (1:10 pm) | Woodville-West Torrens 8.7 (55) | def. | South Adelaide 6.8 (44) | Woodville Oval (crowd: 1,071) |
| Saturday 1 August (2:10 pm) | Norwood 8.17 (65) | def. by | Adelaide 14.10 (94) | Norwood Oval (crowd: 1,844) |
| Saturday 1 August (2:10 pm) | North Adelaide 8.8 (56) | def. by | Glenelg 18.10 (118) | Prospect Oval (crowd: 1,134) |
| Saturday 1 August (2:10 pm) | Port Adelaide 12.7 (79) | def. | Central District 9.8 (62) | Alberton Oval (crowd: 1,536) |
| Saturday 1 August (2:10 pm) | West Adelaide 17.14 (116) | def. | Sturt 9.4 (58) | Richmond Oval (crowd: 1,534) |

=== Round 17 ===
| | Round 17 |
| Saturday 8 August (2:10 pm) | Central District 10.14 (74) | def. | Sturt 10.3 (63) | Elizabeth Oval (crowd: 1,914) |
| Saturday 8 August (2:10 pm) | North Adelaide 7.5 (47) | def. by | Port Adelaide 15.16 (106) | Prospect Oval (crowd: 1,964) |
| Saturday 8 August (2:10 pm) | South Adelaide 9.9 (63) | def. by | Adelaide 10.17 (77) | Hickinbotham Oval (crowd: 1,441) |
| Thursday 13 August (7:40 pm) | Norwood 13.23 (101) | def. | North Adelaide 3.7 (25) | Norwood Oval (crowd: 2,336) |
| Friday 14 August (7:10 pm) | Glenelg 14.10 (94) | def. by | Port Adelaide 14.11 (95) | Glenelg Oval (crowd: 2,723) |
| Saturday 15 August (2:10 pm) | South Adelaide 13.9 (87) | def. | West Adelaide 9.10 (64) | Hickinbotham Oval (crowd: 1,225) |
| Sunday 16 August (2:10 pm) | Woodville-West Torrens 10.7 (67) | def. | Adelaide 10.3 (63) | Woodville Oval (crowd: 4,679) |
The two matches postponed from Round 12 were played as part of Round 17. The South Adelaide–West Adelaide match was rescheduled from 8 August to 15 August to accommodate the other rescheduled matches.; The Woodville-West Torrens–Adelaide fixture was the highest attended match at Woodville Oval in 15 years.

=== Round 18 ===
| | Round 18 |
| Saturday 22 August (2:10 pm) | Central District 14.8 (92) | def. | Glenelg 7.10 (52) | Elizabeth Oval (crowd: 1,950) |
| Saturday 22 August (2:10 pm) | Woodville-West Torrens 10.8 (68) | def. | North Adelaide 4.5 (29) | Woodville Oval (crowd: 1,487) |
| Saturday 22 August (2:10 pm) | Port Adelaide 14.10 (94) | def. | South Adelaide 9.9 (63) | Alberton Oval (crowd: 2,396) |
| Saturday 22 August (2:10 pm) | Sturt 7.7 (49) | def. by | Adelaide 24.12 (156) | Unley Oval (crowd: 2,287) |
| Saturday 22 August (2:10 pm) | West Adelaide 18.14 (122) | def. | Norwood 8.5 (53) | Richmond Oval (crowd: 2,215) |

=== Round 19 ===
| | Round 19 |
| Saturday 29 August (2:10 pm) | North Adelaide 9.7 (61) | def. by | Sturt 15.17 (107) | Prospect Oval (crowd: 2,248) |
| Saturday 29 August (2:10 pm) | Norwood 7.8 (50) | def. by | Woodville-West Torrens 9.7 (61) | Norwood Oval (crowd: 3,199) |
| Saturday 29 August (2:10 pm) | South Adelaide 10.8 (68) | def. by | Central District 11.9 (75) | Hickinbotham Oval (crowd: 2,153) |
| Saturday 29 August (4:30 pm) | Glenelg 13.10 (88) | def. by | Adelaide 24.10 (154) | Glenelg Oval (crowd: 3,613) |
| Sunday 30 August (2:10 pm) | Port Adelaide 17.6 (108) | def. | West Adelaide 10.11 (71) | Alberton Oval (crowd: 3,123) |

== Ladder ==
2015 SANFL Ladder
| Pos | Team | Pld | W | L | D | PF | PA | PP | Pts |
|---|---|---|---|---|---|---|---|---|---|
| 1 | Woodville-West Torrens | 18 | 16 | 2 | 0 | 1392 | 1001 | 58.17 | 32 |
| 2 | Port Adelaide | 18 | 13 | 5 | 0 | 1489 | 1178 | 55.83 | 26 |
| 3 | West Adelaide (P) | 18 | 11 | 7 | 0 | 1634 | 1342 | 54.91 | 22 |
| 4 | Norwood | 18 | 11 | 7 | 0 | 1276 | 1221 | 51.10 | 22 |
| 5 | Central District | 18 | 9 | 8 | 1 | 1328 | 1246 | 51.59 | 19 |
| 6 | South Adelaide | 18 | 9 | 8 | 1 | 1215 | 1169 | 50.96 | 19 |
| 7 | Adelaide | 18 | 8 | 9 | 1 | 1662 | 1408 | 54.14 | 17 |
| 8 | Sturt | 18 | 6 | 12 | 0 | 1333 | 1507 | 46.94 | 12 |
| 9 | Glenelg | 18 | 4 | 13 | 1 | 1386 | 1735 | 44.41 | 9 |
| 10 | North Adelaide | 18 | 1 | 17 | 0 | 957 | 1865 | 33.91 | 2 |

Rules for classification: 1) points; 2) percentage; 3) number of points for.
(P) Premiers

== Finals series ==
=== Qualifying and Elimination Finals ===
| | Elimination Final |
| Sunday 6 September (12:10 pm) | Norwood 4.11 (35) | def. by | Central District 12.7 (79) | Adelaide Oval (crowd: see below) | Report |

| | Qualifying Final |
| Sunday 6 September (3:10 pm) | Port Adelaide 6.5 (41) | def. by | West Adelaide 10.10 (70) | Adelaide Oval (crowd: 8,031) | Report |

=== Semi-finals ===
| | First Semi-final |
| Sunday 13 September (12:10 pm) | Port Adelaide 11.3 (69) | def. by | Central District 10.14 (74) | Adelaide Oval (crowd: see below) | Report |

| | Second Semi-final |
| Sunday 13 September (3:10 pm) | Woodville-West Torrens 11.13 (79) | def. | West Adelaide 9.11 (65) | Adelaide Oval (crowd: 9,247) | Report |

=== Preliminary final ===
| | Preliminary Final |
| Sunday 20 September (2:40 pm) | West Adelaide 15.8 (98) | def. | Central District 6.9 (45) | Adelaide Oval (crowd: 7,218) | Report |

=== Grand Final ===
2015 SANFL Grand Final
Sunday 27 September (2:10 pm) | Woodville-West Torrens | def. by | West Adelaide | Adelaide Oval (crowd: 25,625) | Report
2.0 (12); 5.3 (33); 7.5 (47); 7.6 (48) | Q1; Q2; Q3; Final | 4.1 (25); 6.5 (41); 9.8 (62); 11.12 (78) | Umpires: Haussen, Medlin, Fleer; Jack Oatey Medal: Chris Schmidt (West Adelaide); Television broadcast: Seven Network
4: Wundke; 2: Ainger; 1: Petrenko | Goals | 3: Green; 2: Beech, Webb; 1: Wasley-Black, Tuck, Fielke, Stevens
Wundke, Schwarz, Jarrad | Best | Schmidt, Porplyzia, Stevens, Schiller, Tuck, Helbig, Hartlett, Green
This was West Adelaide's first premiership since 1983.

== Club performances ==
=== Overview by club ===
| Club | Home ground | Minor Round | Finals result | Best & Fairest | Best Home Attendance | Ave Home Attendance |
|---|---|---|---|---|---|---|
| Adelaide | None | 7th | —N/a | Ian Callinan | 2,034 (Rd 7) | 2,034 (1 game) |
| Central District | Elizabeth Oval | 5th | 3rd | Travis Schiller | 2,665 (Rd 2) | 1,979 (10 games) |
| Glenelg | Glenelg Oval | 9th | —N/a | Matthew Snook | 5,221 (Rd 1) | 3,198 (10 games) |
| North Adelaide | Prospect Oval | 10th | —N/a | Marlon Motlop | 2,635 (Rd 8) | 1,872 (10 games) |
| Norwood | Norwood Oval | 4th | 5th | Matthew Panos | 6,927 (Rd 1) | 3,156 (11 games) |
| Port Adelaide | Alberton Oval | 2nd | 4th | TBA | 5,526 (Rd 4) | 2,861 (9 games) |
| South Adelaide | Hickinbotham Oval | 6th | —N/a | Joel Cross | 2,173 (Rd 9) | 1,687 (9 games) |
| Sturt | Unley Oval | 8th | —N/a | Zane Kirkwood | 3,995 (Rd 10) | 2,830 (10 games) |
| West Adelaide | Richmond Oval | 3rd | **Premiers** | Jason Porplyzia | 3,639 (Rd 12) | 1,904 (10 games) |
| Woodville-West Torrens | Woodville Oval | 1st | Runner Up | Angus Rowntree | 4,679 (Rd 17) | 2,290 (10 games) |

=== SANFL Win/Loss Table ===
| Team | 1 | 2 | 3 | 4 | 5 | 6 | 7 | 8 | 9 | 10 | 11 | 12 | 13 | 14 | 15 | 16 | 17 | 18 | 19 | F1 | F2 | F3 | GF | Ladder |
|---|---|---|---|---|---|---|---|---|---|---|---|---|---|---|---|---|---|---|---|---|---|---|---|---|
| Adelaide | X | North; 3 | West; 29 | Gln; 0 | South; 14 | Norw; 42 | **Port**; **35** | CD; 20 | Sturt; 49 | WWT; 13 | Port; 20 | South; 14 | CD; 35 | North; 101 | West; 63 | Norw; 29 | WWT; 4 | Sturt; 107 | Gln; 66 | X | X | X | X | 7 |
| Central District | X | **Norw**; **24** | Gln; 15 | **WWT**; **40** | West; 34 | **South**; **0** | Sturt; 14 | **Adel**; **20** | **Port**; **8** | **North**; **99** | WWT; 32 | Norw; 24 | **Adel**; **35** | **West**; **11** | North; 11 | Port; 17 | **Sturt**; **11** | **Gln**; **40** | South; 7 | Norw; 44 | Port; 5 | West; 53 | X | 3 |
| Glenelg | **South**; **20** | Sturt; 28 | **CD**; **15** | **Adel**; **0** | Norw; 45 | WWT; 23 | **West**; **112** | Port; 8 | **North**; **35** | South; 20 | **Norw**; **9** | **Sturt**; **5** | West; 38 | X | **WWT**; **44** | North; 62 | **Port**; **1** | CD; 40 | **Adel**; **66** | X | X | X | X | 9 |
| North Adelaide | X | **Adel**; **3** | Port; 38 | **South**; **16** | Sturt; 62 | West; 78 | **WWT**; **44** | **Norw**; **6** | Gln; 35 | CD; 99 | **West**; **76** | **Port**; **59** | South; 65 | **Adel**; **101** | **CD**; **11** | **Gln**; **62** | Norw; 76 | WWT; 39 | **Sturt**; **46** | X | X | X | X | 10 |
| Norwood | **Sturt**; **19** | CD; 24 | WWT; 81 | Port; 21 | **Gln**; **45** | **Adel**; **42** | **South**; **17** | North; 6 | **West**; **6** | Sturt; 22 | Gln; 9 | **CD**; **24** | **Port**; **1** | X | **South**; **1** | **Adel**; **29** | **North**; **76** | West; 69 | **WWT**; **11** | **CD**; **44** | X | X | X | 5 |
| Port Adelaide | X | South; 66 | **North**; **38** | **Norw**; **21** | **WWT**; **17** | **Sturt**; **8** | Adel; 35 | **Gln**; **8** | CD; 8 | West; 50 | **Adel**; **20** | North; 59 | Norw; 1 | WWT; 41 | Sturt; 27 | **CD**; **17** | Gln; 1 | **South**; **31** | **West**; **37** | **West**; **29** | **CD**; **5** | X | X | 4 |
| South Adelaide | Gln; 20 | **Port**; **66** | **Sturt**; **23** | North; 16 | **Adel**; **14** | CD; 0 | Norw; 17 | West; 1 | **WWT**; **29** | **Gln**; **20** | Sturt; 39 | **Adel**; **14** | **North**; **65** | X | Norw; 1 | WWT; 11 | **West**; **23** | Port; 31 | **CD**; **7** | X | X | X | X | 6 |
| Sturt | Norw; 19 | **Gln**; **28** | South; 23 | **West**; **26** | **North**; **62** | Port; 8 | **CD**; **14** | WWT; 17 | **Adel**; **49** | **Norw**; **22** | **South**; **39** | Gln; 5 | **WWT**; **18** | X | **Port**; **27** | West; 58 | CD; 11 | **Adel**; **107** | North; 46 | X | X | X | X | 8 |
| West Adelaide | X | WWT; 6 | **Adel**; **29** | Sturt; 26 | **CD**; **34** | **North**; **78** | Gln; 112 | **South**; **1** | Norw; 6 | **Port**; **50** | North; 76 | **WWT**; **15** | **Gln**; **38** | CD; 11 | **Adel**; **63** | **Sturt**; **58** | South; 23 | **Norw**; **69** | Port; 37 | Port; 29 | WWT; 14 | **CD**; **53** | WWT; 30 | 1 |
| Woodville-West Torrens | X | **West**; **6** | **Norw**; **81** | CD; 40 | Port; 17 | **Gln**; **23** | North; 44 | **Sturt**; **17** | South; 29 | **Adel**; **13** | **CD**; **32** | West; 15 | Sturt; 18 | **Port**; **41** | Gln; 44 | **South**; **11** | **Adel**; **4** | **North**; **39** | Norw; 11 | X | **West**; **14** | X | **West**; **30** | 2 |
| Team | 1 | 2 | 3 | 4 | 5 | 6 | 7 | 8 | 9 | 10 | 11 | 12 | 13 | 14 | 15 | 16 | 17 | 18 | 19 | F1 | F2 | F3 | GF | Ladder |

| + | Win | Qualified for finals |
| − | Loss | Eliminated |

Bold – Home game
X – Did Not Play
Opponent for round listed above margin |}

== Awards and premiers ==
=== Awards ===
- The Magarey Medal (awarded to the best and fairest player in the home and away season) was won by Joel Cross of South Adelaide, who polled 25 votes. It was Cross' second Magarey Medal, having tied for the medal in 2012.
- The Ken Farmer Medal (awarded to the leading goalkicker in the home and away season) was won by Clint Alleway of Glenelg. He kicked 47 goals in the 2015 home and away season.
- The Stanley H. Lewis Memorial Trophy (awarded to the best performing club in the League, Reserves and Under 18 competitions) was won by Woodville West-Torrens, with 3300 points, which was 1050 points ahead of second-place Norwood.
- The R.O. Shearman Medal (awarded to the player adjudged best by the 10 SANFL club coaches each game) was won by Joel Cross of South Adelaide.
- Woodville-West Torrens were the league minor premiers, finishing top of the ladder at the end of the home and away season with 16 wins and 2 losses. It is the club's 5th minor premiership in the SANFL.
- The annual City v. Country Cup Match was held in May 2015 at the Adelaide Oval. The match was won by Country, who defeated City by 96 points; 14.15 (99) to 0.3 (3).
- The Under 16 Talent Shield competition was won by Sturt, who defeated South Adelaide in the Grand Final by 57 points; 14.12 (96) to 5.9 (39).

=== Premiers ===
- West Adelaide were the League premiers, defeating Woodville-West Torrens by 30 points.
- Woodville-West Torrens were the Reserves premiers, defeating North Adelaide by 27 points.
- Norwood were the Under 18 premiers, defeating Woodville-West Torrens by 18 points.
