= 2013 SANFL season =

- Teams: 9
- Premiers: Norwood; 29th premiership
- Minor premiers: Norwood; 18th minor premiership
- Magarey Medallist: Matt Thomas; Norwood (26 votes)
- Ken Farmer Medallist: Michael Wundke; South Adelaide (52 goals)

Attendance
- Matches played: 96
- Total attendance: 293,183 (3,054 per match)
- Highest: 36,685 (Grand Final, Norwood vs. North Adelaide)

The 2013 South Australian National Football League season was the 134th season of the top-level Australian rules football competition in South Australia.

The season opened on 28 March with the opening fixture between West Adelaide and Central District, and concluded on 6 October with the Grand Final, in which minor premiers Norwood went on to record its 29th premiership, defeating North Adelaide by 40 points.

Woodville-West Torrens, West Adelaide, Central District also made the top (final) five teams and participated in the finals series. Port Adelaide, Sturt, South Adelaide, Glenelg all missed the top five, with the last of those finishing last to record its 16th wooden spoon.

== Premiership season ==
=== Round 1 ===
	Round 1
Thursday, 28 March (7:10 pm)	West Adelaide 16.9 (105)	def.	Central District 13.12 (90)	Richmond Oval (crowd: 2,971)	Report
Thursday, 28 March (7:40 pm)	Norwood 16.11 (107)	def.	Port Adelaide 4.10 (34)	Norwood Oval (crowd: 7,560)	Report
Friday, 29 March (5:00 pm)	South Adelaide 14.6 (90)	def. by	Glenelg 17.17 (119)	Hickinbotham Oval (crowd: 4,530)	Report
Saturday, 30 March (2:10 pm)	Sturt 15.6 (96)	def. by	Woodville-West Torrens 18.14 (122)	Unley Oval (crowd: 3,156)	Report
	Bye; North Adelaide

=== Round 2 ===
	Round 2
Saturday, 6 April (2:10pm)	Woodville-West Torrens 7.8 (50)	def. by	West Adelaide 18.14 (122)	Woodville Oval (crowd: 2,483)
Saturday, 6 April (2:10pm)	Sturt 18.8 (116)	def.	Port Adelaide 16.14 (110)	Unley Oval (crowd: 3,015)
Saturday, 6 April (6:30pm)	Central District 12.11 (83)	def. by	North Adelaide 19.10 (124)	Elizabeth Oval (crowd: 3,149)
Saturday, 6 April (6:30pm)	Glenelg 9.9 (63)	def. by	Norwood 21.21 (147)	Glenelg Oval (crowd: 4,489)
	Bye; South Adelaide

=== Round 3 ===
	Round 3
Friday, 12 April (7:40 pm)	South Adelaide 5.8 (38)	def. by	West Adelaide 22.12 (144)	Hickinbotham Oval (crowd: 2,062)
Saturday, 13 April (2:10 pm)	North Adelaide 17.16 (118)	def.	Sturt 14.8 (92)	Prospect Oval (crowd: 3,301)
Saturday, 13 April (2:10 pm)	Port Adelaide 16.10 (106)	def.	Glenelg 15.14 (104)	Alberton Oval (crowd: 3,007)
Saturday, 13 April (6:30 pm)	Central District 7.9 (51)	def. by	Norwood 9.6 (60)	Elizabeth Oval (crowd: 3,167)
	Bye; Woodville-West Torrens

=== Round 4 ===
	Round 4
Friday, 19 April (7:10 pm)	West Adelaide 8.10 (58)	def.	North Adelaide 7.15 (57)	Richmond Oval (crowd: 3,175)
Friday, 19 April (7:40 pm)	Norwood 7.12 (54)	def. by	Woodville-West Torrens 14.6 (90)	Norwood Oval (crowd: 4,663)
Saturday, 20 April (2:10 pm)	Sturt 13.10 (88)	def. by	South Adelaide 18.11 (119)	Unley Oval (crowd: 2,204)
Saturday, 20 April (6:30 pm)	Glenelg 12.12 (84)	def.	Central District 10.14 (74)	Glenelg Oval (crowd: 3,398)
	Bye; Port Adelaide

=== Round 5 ===
	Round 5
Thursday, 25 April (3:10 pm)	Norwood 9.13 (67)	def.	West Adelaide 6.5 (41)	Norwood Oval (crowd: 6,038)
Friday, 26 April (7:40 pm)	South Adelaide 12.7 (79)	def. by	North Adelaide 18.9 (117)	Hickinbotham Oval (crowd: 1,873)
Saturday, 27 April (2:10 pm)	Woodville-West Torrens 16.8 (104)	def.	Port Adelaide 11.9 (75)	Woodville Oval (crowd: 2,710)
Saturday, 27 April (6:30 pm)	Glenelg 17.11 (113)	def.	Sturt 12.13 (85)	Glenelg Oval (crowd: 3,762)
	Bye; Central District

=== Round 6 ===
	Round 6
Friday, 3 May (7:10 pm)	West Adelaide 18.7 (115)	def.	Glenelg 10.5 (65)	Richmond Oval (crowd: 2,553)
Saturday, 4 May (2:10 pm)	North Adelaide 14.5 (89)	def.	Norwood 9.14 (68)	Prospect Oval (crowd: 3,142)
Sunday, 5 May (2:10 pm)	Port Adelaide 11.6 (72)	def. by	Central District 18.7 (115)	Alberton Oval (crowd: 3,304)
Sunday, 5 May (2:10 pm)	Woodville-West Torrens 23.19 (157)	def.	South Adelaide 6.7 (43)	Woodville Oval (crowd: 2,048)
	Bye; Sturt

=== Round 7 ===
	Round 7
Friday, 17 May (7:10 pm)	West Adelaide 11.11 (77)	def.	Port Adelaide 9.8 (62)	Richmond Oval (crowd: 2,665)
Saturday, 18 May (2:10 pm)	North Adelaide 18.14 (122)	def.	Woodville-West Torrens 13.6 (84)	Prospect Oval (crowd: 3,131)
Saturday, 18 May (2:10 pm)	Central District 20.12 (132)	def.	Sturt 15.15 (105)	Elizabeth Oval (crowd: 2,250)
Saturday, 18 May (6:30 pm)	South Adelaide 10.6 (66)	def. by	Norwood 14.7 (91)	Hickinbotham Oval (crowd: 2,038)
	Bye; Glenelg

=== Round 8 ===
	Round 8
Saturday, 25 May (2:10 pm)	Sturt 11.9 (75)	def. by	West Adelaide 12.10 (82)	Unley Oval (crowd: 2,407)
Saturday, 25 May (2:10 pm)	Woodville-West Torrens 25.7 (157)	def.	Glenelg 9.15 (69)	Woodville Oval (crowd: 2,007)
Saturday, 25 May (2:10 pm)	South Adelaide 10.10 (70)	def. by	Central District 13.17 (95)	Hickinbotham Oval (crowd: 1,505)
Sunday, 26 May (2:10 pm)	Port Adelaide 13.8 (86)	def.	North Adelaide 9.15 (69)	Alberton Oval (crowd: 2,819)
	Bye; Norwood

=== Round 9 ===
	Round 9
Friday, 31 May (7:10 pm)	Glenelg 8.4 (52)	def. by	South Adelaide 11.17 (83)	Glenelg Oval (crowd: 1,555)
Friday, 31 May (7:40 pm)	Norwood 14.15 (99)	def.	Sturt 8.5 (53)	Norwood Oval (crowd: 2,300)
Saturday, 1 June (2013)	Central District 14.11 (95)	def.	Woodville-West Torrens 8.12 (60)	Elizabeth Oval (crowd: 1,365)
Sunday, 2 June (2:10 pm)	North Adelaide 14.10 (94)	def.	West Adelaide 13.7 (85)	Prospect Oval (crowd: 2,781)
	Bye; Port Adelaide

=== Round 10 ===
	Round 10
Saturday, 8 June (2:10 pm)	West Adelaide 10.7 (67)	def. by	Norwood 15.7 (97)	Richmond Oval
Sunday, 9 June (2:10 pm)	Port Adelaide 19.11 (125)	def.	South Adelaide 9.8 (62)	Alberton Oval
Sunday, 9 June (2:10 pm)	Woodville-West Torrens 10.7 (67)	def. by	Sturt 16.7 (103)	Woodville Oval
Monday, 10 June (2:10 pm)	Glenelg 9.13 (67)	def. by	North Adelaide 18.17 (125)	Glenelg Oval
	Bye; Central District

=== Round 11 ===
	Round 11
Saturday, 15 June (2:10 pm)	South Adelaide 4.9 (33)	def. by	Woodville-West Torrens 11.6 (72)	Hickinbotham Oval (crowd: 1,203)
Saturday, 15 June (2:10 pm)	Port Adelaide 10.9 (69)	def.	Norwood 9.10 (64)	Alberton Oval (crowd: 3,586)
Sunday, 16 June (2:10 pm)	North Adelaide 12.8 (80)	def. by	Central District 14.18 (102)	Prospect Oval (crowd: 3,493)
Sunday, 16 June (2:10 pm)	Sturt 15.17 (107)	def.	Glenelg 13.6 (84)	Unley Oval (crowd: 3,406)
	Bye; West Adelaide

=== Round 12 ===
	Round 12
Saturday, 22 June (2:10 pm)	Norwood 17.10 (112)	def.	South Adelaide 7.7 (49)	Norwood Oval (crowd: 2,114)
Saturday, 22 June (2:10 pm)	North Adelaide 18.11 (119)	def.	Sturt 6.7 (43)	Prospect Oval (crowd: 2,134)
Saturday, 22 June (2:10 pm)	Central District 8.3 (51)	def. by	Port Adelaide 8.5 (53)	Elizabeth Oval
Sunday, 23 June (2:10 pm)	Glenelg 8.8 (56)	def. by	West Adelaide 19.16 (130)	Glenelg Oval (crowd: 2,398)
	Bye; Woodville-West Torrens

=== Round 13 ===
	Round 13
Saturday, 29 June (2:10 pm)	Central District 6.4 (40)	def. by	Norwood 11.17 (83)	Elizabeth Oval (crowd: 2,365)
Sunday, 30 June (2:10 pm)	Port Adelaide 13.9 (87)	def. by	Woodville-West Torrens 14.14 (98)	Alberton Oval (crowd: 3,440)
Sunday, 30 June (2:10 pm)	South Adelaide 9.10 (64)	def.	West Adelaide 8.6 (64)	Hickinbotham Oval (crowd: 1,334)
	Bye; Glenelg, North Adelaide, Sturt

=== Round 14 ===
	Round 14
Friday, 5 July (7:40 pm)	Norwood 23.13 (151)	def.	Glenelg 7.7 (49)	Norwood Oval (crowd: 2,969)
Saturday, 6 July (2:10 pm)	West Adelaide 7.14 (56)	def. by	Central District 10.9 (69)	Richmond Oval (crowd: 1,568)
Saturday, 6 July (2:10 pm)	South Adelaide 6.7 (43)	def.	Sturt 5.8 (38)	Hickinbotham Oval (crowd: 1,277)
Sunday, 7 July (2:10 pm)	Woodville-West Torrens 10.12 (72)	def.	North Adelaide 10.10 (70)	Woodville Oval (crowd: 2,462)
	Bye; Port Adelaide

=== Round 15 ===
	Round 15
Saturday, 13 July (2:10 pm)	Central District 8.11 (59)	def.	South Adelaide 4.11 (35)	Elizabeth Oval (crowd: 1,387)
Saturday, 13 July (2:10 pm)	Glenelg 7.8 (50)	def. by	North Adelaide 21.11 (137)	Glenelg Oval (crowd: 1,568)
Saturday, 13 July (2:10 pm)	West Adelaide 13.9 (87)	def.	Woodville-West Torrens 5.6 (36)	Richmond Oval (crowd: 1,699)
Sunday, 14 July (2:10 pm)	Sturt 13.9 (87)	def.	Port Adelaide 10.5 (65)	Unley Oval (crowd: 2,419)
	Bye; Norwood

=== Round 16 ===
	Round 16
Saturday, 20 July (2:10 pm)	Sturt 2.8 (20)	def. by	Norwood 9.12 (66)	Unley Oval (crowd: 2,396)
Saturday, 20 July (2:10 pm)	North Adelaide 15.9 (99)	def.	Port Adelaide 3.8 (26)	Prospect Oval (crowd: 2,013)
Saturday, 20 July (2:10 pm)	Woodville-West Torrens 10.8 (68)	def.	Central District 8.8 (56)	Woodville Oval (crowd: 1,610)
Saturday, 20 July (2:10 pm)	South Adelaide 12.7 (79)	def.	Glenelg 8.8 (56)	Hickenbotham Oval (crowd: 1,147)
	Bye; West Adelaide

=== Round 17 ===
	Round 17
Saturday, 27 July (2:10 pm)	Port Adelaide 9.9 (63)	def.	Glenelg 8.12 (60)	Alberton Oval
Saturday, 27 July (2:10 pm)	Norwood 8.10 (58)	def.	West Adelaide 8.7 (55)	Norwood Oval
Saturday, 27 July (2:10 pm)	Woodville-West Torrens 9.15 (69)	def. by	Sturt 13.6 (84)	Woodville Oval
Sunday, 28 July (2:10 pm)	North Adelaide 26.11 (167)	def.	South Adelaide 8.14 (62)	Prospect Oval
	Bye; Central District

=== Round 18 ===
	Round 18
Friday, 2 August (7:40 pm)	Norwood 13.5 (83)	def.	Port Adelaide 2.8 (20)	Norwood Oval (crowd: 4,197)
Saturday, 3 August (2:10 pm)	Glenelg 3.8 (26)	def. by	Woodville-West Torrens 10.10 (70)	Glenelg Oval (crowd: 1,739)
Saturday, 3 August (2:10 pm)	Central District 11.13 (79)	def.	North Adelaide 4.5 (29)	Elizabeth Oval (crowd: 1,802)
Saturday, 3 August (2:10 pm)	West Adelaide 10.17 (77)	def.	Sturt 2.9 (21)	Richmond Oval (crowd: 1,728)
	Bye; South Adelaide

=== Round 19 ===
	Round 19
Saturday, 10 August (2:10 pm)	Woodville-West Torrens 18.5 (113)	def.	South Adelaide 6.9 (45)	Woodville Oval
Saturday, 10 August (2:10 pm)	Sturt 10.11 (71)	def.	North Adelaide 7.11 (53)	Unley Oval (crowd: 2,138)
Sunday, 11 August (2:10 pm)	Port Adelaide 13.14 (92)	def. by	Central District 21.12 (138)	Alberton Oval
	Bye; Glenelg, Norwood, West Adelaide

=== Round 20 ===
	Round 20
Saturday, 17 August (2:10 pm)	North Adelaide 9.10 (64)	def. by	Woodville-West Torrens 17.12 (114)	Prospect Oval (crowd: 1,568)
Saturday, 17 August (2:10 pm)	Central District 10.15 (75)	def.	West Adelaide 7.3 (45)	Elizabeth Oval (crowd: 1,751)
Sunday, 18 August (2:10 pm)	South Adelaide 4.5 (29)	def. by	Port Adelaide 5.8 (38)	Hickinbotham Oval (crowd: 1,287)
Sunday, 18 August (2:10 pm)	Glenelg 8.5 (53)	def. by	Norwood 9.7 (61)	Glenelg Oval (crowd: 1,856)
	Bye; Sturt

=== Round 21 ===
	Round 21
Saturday, 24 August (2:10 pm)	West Adelaide 23.8 (146)	def.	South Adelaide 3.11 (29)	Richmond Oval (crowd: 1,262)
Saturday, 24 August (2:10 pm)	Norwood 16.12 (108)	def.	Central District 7.13 (55)	Norwood Oval (crowd: 2,520)
Sunday, 25 August (2:10 pm)	North Adelaide 6.10 (46)	def. by	Glenelg 17.11 (113)	Prospect Oval (crowd: 2,494)
Sunday, 25 August (2:10 pm)	Port Adelaide 11.13 (79)	def. by	Sturt 12.14 (86)	Alberton Oval
	Bye; Woodville-West Torrens

=== Round 22 ===
	Round 22
Saturday, 31 August (2:10 pm)	Central District 22.10 (142)	def.	Glenelg 12.7 (79)	Elizabeth Oval (crowd: 2,206)
Sunday, 1 September (2:10 pm)	Port Adelaide 8.12 (60)	def. by	West Adelaide 9.10 (64)	Alberton Oval
Sunday, 1 September (2:10 pm)	Sturt 13.12 (90)	def. by	South Adelaide 15.12 (102)	Unley Oval
Sunday, 1 September (2:10 pm)	Woodville-West Torrens 5.12 (42)	def. by	Norwood 11.17 (83)	Woodville Oval (crowd: 3,681)
	Bye; North Adelaide

=== Round 23 ===
	Round 23
Saturday, 7 September (3:30 pm)	Glenelg 11.14 (80)	def. by	Port Adelaide 14.12 (96)	Glenelg Oval (crowd: 2,723)
Sunday, 8 September (2:10 pm)	Norwood 14.16 (100)	def.	North Adelaide 7.7 (49)	Norwood Oval (crowd: 4,480)
Sunday, 8 September (2:10 pm)	Sturt 15.13 (103)	def. by	Central District 19.14 (128)	Unley Oval (crowd: 2,086)
Sunday, 8 September (2:10 pm)	West Adelaide 11.6 (72)	def. by	Woodville-West Torrens 22.11 (143)	Richmond Oval
	Bye; South Adelaide

== Ladder ==
2013 Ladder
Pos	Team	Pld	W	L	D	PF	PA	PP	Pts
1	Norwood (P)	20	17	3	0	1759	1055	62.51	34
2	Woodville-West Torrens	20	13	7	0	1788	1486	54.61	26
3	West Adelaide	20	12	8	0	1682	1306	56.29	24
4	Central District	20	12	8	0	1729	1511	53.36	24
5	North Adelaide	20	11	9	0	1828	1534	54.37	22
6	Port Adelaide	20	8	12	0	1418	1693	45.58	16
7	Sturt	20	7	13	0	1536	1847	45.40	14
8	South Adelaide	20	6	14	0	1220	1933	38.69	12
9	Glenelg	20	4	16	0	1442	2064	41.13	8

Source: australianfootball.com
Rules for classification: 1) points; 2) percentage; 3) number of points for.
(P) Premiers

== Finals series ==
=== Week 1 ===
	Elimination and qualifying Finals
Sunday, 15 September (12:10pm)	Central District 10.14 (74)	def. by	North Adelaide 20.16 (136)	Football Park
Sunday, 15 September (3:10pm)	Woodville-West Torrens 11.16 (82)	def. by	West Adelaide 14.5 (89)	Football Park
	Bye; Norwood

=== Week 2 ===
	Semi-finals
Sunday, 22 September (12:10pm)	Woodville-West Torrens 12.11 (83)	def. by	North Adelaide 15.10 (100)	Football Park (crowd: 9,248)	Report
Sunday, 22 September (3:10pm)	Norwood 14.16 (100)	def.	West Adelaide 6.8 (44)	Football Park (crowd: 9,248)

=== Week 3 ===
	Preliminary Final
Sunday, 29 September (3:10pm)	West Adelaide 8.8 (56)	def. by	North Adelaide 16.16 (112)	Football Park (crowd: 5,221)	Report
	Bye; Norwood

=== Week 4 (2013 SANFL Grand Final) ===
Grand Final
Sunday, 6 October (3:20 pm)	Norwood	def.	North Adelaide	Football Park (crowd: 36,685)	Report
2.5 (17); 6.5 (41); 6.8 (44); 10.12 (72)	Q1; Q2; Q3; Final	1.2 (8); 3.2 (20); 4.7 (31); 4.8 (32)	Umpires: Michael Avon, Curtis Deboy, Leigh Haussen; Jack Oatey Medal: Brett Zorzi; Television broadcast: ABC South Australia
Warren 4 Grigg 2 Zorzi, Thomas, Davis, Fuller 1	Goals	1 Gordon, Stewart, Johnston, Ryswyk
Zorzi, Warren, Georgiou, McGuinness, Dumont, Dawe	Best	Keller, Miles, Fenton, Campbell, Williams, Ryswyk
Baulderstone (knee)	Injuries	Gordon (hand)
Jefferies (kicking)	Reports

== Club Performances ==
Club	Home ground	Minor Round ladder position	Final ladder position	Best Home Attendance	Membership
Central District	Elizabeth Oval	4th	5th	3,167 (Rd 3)	
Glenelg	Glenelg Oval	9th	9th	4,489 (Rd 2)	
North Adelaide	Prospect Oval	5th	2nd	3,493 (Rd 11)	
Norwood	Norwood Oval	1st	1st	7,560 (Rd 1)	3,223
Port Adelaide	Alberton Oval	6th	6th	3,586 (Rd 11)	
South Adelaide	Hickinbotham Oval	8th	8th	4,530 (Rd 1)	
Sturt	Unley Oval	7th	7th	3,406 (Rd 11)	
West Adelaide	Richmond Oval	3rd	3rd	3,175 (Rd 4)	
Woodville-West Torrens	Woodville Oval; Thebarton Oval	2nd	4th	3,681 (Rd 22)	

=== Best and fairest ===
Club	Award name	Player
Central District	Norm Russell Medal	Brayden O'Hara
Glenelg	John H. Ellers Award	Andrew Bradley
North Adelaide	Barrie Robran Medal	Todd Miles
Norwood	Club Champion	Ben Jefferies
Port Adelaide	A R McLean Medal	Sam Gray
South Adelaide	Knuckey Cup	Nick Liddle
Sturt	PT Morton Medal	Ben Kane
West Adelaide	Steve Hamra Medallist	Ryan Ferguson & Chris Schmidt
Woodville-West Torrens	Eagles Club Champion Award	Phil Raymond

== Ken Farmer Medal ==
The Ken Farmer Medal is awarded to the SANFL's leading goal scorer during the home and away season.

Player	Team	Goals (not incl. finals)
Michael Wundke	South Adelaide	52
Andrew Ainger	Woodville-West Torrens	50
Leigh Ryswyk	North Adelaide	39

== Current clubs ==
Adelaide SANFL Football Grounds

Club	Nickname	Entered competition	Premierships (as of 2012)	Most Recent Premiership	Home Ground	Capacity
Central District	Bulldogs	1964	9	2010	Elizabeth Oval	18,000
Glenelg	Tigers	1921	4	1986	Glenelg Oval	15,000
North Adelaide	Roosters	1887	13	1991	Prospect Oval	20,000
Norwood	Redlegs	1878	28	2012	Norwood Oval	14,000
Port Adelaide	Magpies	1877	36	1999	Alberton Oval	17,000
South Adelaide	Panthers	1877	11	1964	Hickinbotham Oval	12,000
Sturt	Double Blues	1901	13	2002	Unley Oval	15,000
West Adelaide	Bloods	1897	8	1983	Richmond Oval	16,500
Woodville-West Torrens	Eagles	1991	3	2011	Woodville Oval	15,000
