= 1961 Brisbane Carnival =

Tournament information
- Sport: Australian football
- Location: Brisbane, Australia
- Dates: 15 July 1961–23 July 1961
- Format: Round Robin
- Teams: 4

Final champion
- Western Australia

The 1961 Brisbane Carnival was the 15th edition of the Australian National Football Carnival, an Australian football interstate competition. It was the last carnival to be held in Queensland.

It was one of the most competitive carnivals to have been played, with the traditional carnival powerhouse Victoria going down to Western Australia in the final game to give Western Australia its first carnival victory since 1921. Despite Victoria comfortably accounting for South Australia, the Western Australians narrowly lost their game to South Australia. Tasmania, who traditionally struggle, lost all games but got within seven points of the South Australians. With Western Australia, South Australia and Victoria all finishing on 2 wins and a loss, Western Australia won the championship due to a superior percentage.

In 2014, the Western Australian team from this carnival was inducted as a whole into the West Australian Football Hall of Fame.

== Teams ==
Although the carnival took place in Brisbane, no Queensland team competed in the tournament. The four teams were Victoria, Western Australia, South Australia and Tasmania.

=== South Australian Squad ===
Players: John Abley (Port Adelaide); Barrie Barbary (North Adelaide); Fred Bills (West Torrens); Jeff Bray (West Adelaide); John Cahill (Port Adelaide); Ken Eustice (West Adelaide); Paul Garnett (West Adelaide); Ian Hannaford (Port Adelaide); John Halbert (Sturt); Neville Hayes (Port Adelaide); Lindsay Head (West Torrens); Bill Herron (Glenelg); Frank Hogan (West Adelaide); Dick Jackson (South Adelaide); Geoff Kingston (West Torrens); Neil Kerley (West Adelaide), captain; Don Lindner (North Adelaide); Theo "Hank" Lindner (North Adelaide); Trevor Obst (Port Adelaide); Des Panizza (South Adelaide); Jeff Potter (Port Adelaide); Don Roach (West Adelaide); Bob Shearman (West Torrens); and Bill Wedding (Norwood).
Coach: Fos Williams.

=== Tasmanian Squad ===
Players: Trevor Anthony (East Devonport); John Archer (Launceston); Darrel Baldock (Latrobe), captain; Ted Banks (Clarence); Roger Browning (New Norfolk); Arthur Cole (Hobart); Neil Conlan (Devonport); John Fitzallen (Longford); Dale Flint (Sandy Bay); Don Gale (Burnie); Rex Geard (Sandy Bay); Ivan Hayes (Longford); Len Lawson (Latrobe); "Casey" Lawrence (Longford); Trevor Leo (Hobart); Rex Lethborg (Scottsdale); Ron Marney (Glenorchy); Peter Marquis (North Hobart); Stan Morcom (City-South); Colin Moore (North Hobart); John Noble (North Hobart); Garth Smith (Ulverstone); Murray Steele (Sandy Bay); Kevin Symons (Burnie); and Bob Withers (North Launceston), vice-captain.
Coach: Jack Metherell.

=== Victorian Squad ===
Players: Owen Abrahams (Fitzroy); Frank Adams (Melbourne); Allen Aylett (North Melbourne); Ron Barassi (Melbourne); Terry Callan (Geelong); Brian Dixon (Melbourne); Brian Gray (Collingwood); John Heriot (South Melbourne); John James (Carlton); Graeme MacKenzie (Fitzroy); Hugh Mitchell (Essendon); Ian Mort (Hawthorn); Kevin Murray (Fitzroy); John Nicholls (Carlton); Lance Oswald (St Kilda); John Peck (Hawthorn); Neil Roberts (St Kilda); John Schultz (Footscray); Fred Swift (Richmond); Jim Taylor (South Melbourne); Noel Teasdale (North Melbourne); Ken Turner (Collingwood); and Ted Whitten (Footscray).
Coach: Len Smith (Fitzroy).

=== Western Australian Squad ===
Players: Malcolm Atwell (East Perth); Ken Bagley (Swan Districts); Dinny Barron (Subiaco); Neville Beard (Perth); Haydn Bunton Jr. (Swan Districts), captain; Derek Chadwick (East Perth); Jack Clarke (East Fremantle); John Colgan (South Fremantle); Lorne Cook (Claremont); John Dethridge (Claremont); Joe Fanchi (West Perth); Graham Farmer (East Perth); Ray Gabelich (West Perth); John Gerovich (South Fremantle); Bob Graham (East Perth); Ken Holt (East Fremantle); Denis Marshall (Claremont); Barry Metcalfe (Claremont); Les Mumme (Claremont); Con Regan (East Fremantle); Norm Rogers (East Fremantle); Keith Slater (Swan Districts); Ray Sorrell (East Fremantle); John Todd (South Fremantle), vice captain; John Turnbull (Swan Districts); and Don Williams (West Perth).
Coach: Jack Sheedy, (East Perth).

== Results ==
	Game 1
Saturday, 15 July	Victoria 21.22 (148)	def.	South Australia 13.12 (90)	The Gabba

	Game 2
Sunday, 16 July	Western Australia 24.23 (167)	def.	Tasmania 10.6 (66)	The Gabba (crowd: 7,192)	Match report

	Game 3
Wednesday, 19 July	Western Australia 15.17 (107)	def. by	South Australia 16.13 (109)	The Gabba	Match report

	Game 4
Wednesday, 19 July	Victoria 20.30 (150)	def.	Tasmania 12.17 (89)	The Gabba (crowd: 4,746)	Match report

	Game 5
Sunday, 23 July	South Australia 15.17 (107)	def.	Tasmania 14.16 (100)	The Gabba

	Game 6
Sunday, 23 July	Western Australia 15.14 (104)	def.	Victoria 14.11 (95)	The Gabba (crowd: 7,500)	Match report

=== Points table ===
Pos	Team	Pld	W	L	PF	PA	PP	Pts
1	Western Australia	3	2	1	378	270	140.0	8
2	Victorian	3	2	1	393	283	138.9	8
3	South Australia	3	2	1	306	355	86.2	8
4	Tasmania	3	0	3	255	424	60.1	0

== All-Australian team ==
In 1961 the All-Australian team was picked based on the Brisbane Carnival. Ron Barassi was named as captain. West Australian ruckman Jack Clarke became the first person to be named in four All Australian teams.

1961 All-Australian team
B:	Neil Kerley (SA, West Adelaide)	John Abley (SA, Port Adelaide)	John Schultz (Vic, Footscray)
HB:	Ted Whitten (Vic, Footscray)	Ray Gabelich (WA, West Perth)	Bob Shearman (SA, West Torrens)
C:	Brian Dixon (Vic, Melbourne)	John Halbert (SA, Sturt)	John Todd (WA, South Fremantle)
HF:	Don Roach (SA, West Adelaide)	Don Lindner (SA, North Adelaide)	Darrel Baldock (Tas, Latrobe)
F:	Graham Farmer (WA, East Perth)	Geoff Kingston (SA, West Torrens)	Bob Withers (Tas, North Launceston)
Foll:	Jack Clarke (WA, East Fremantle)	Ron Barassi (Vic, Melbourne) (captain)	Allen Aylett (Vic, North Melbourne)
Int:	Ray Sorrell (WA, East Fremantle)	Bill Wedding ( SA, Norwood)	

== Tassie Medal ==
Brian Dixon of the VFL won the Tassie Medal after beating East Fremantle's Jack Clarke by one vote.

Player	State	Votes received	Total
Brian Dixon	Victoria	3,3,2	8
Jack Clarke	Western Australia	3,3,1	7
Allen Aylett	Victoria	3,2	5
Darrel Baldock	Tasmania	3,1	4
Don Lindner	South Australia	2,1	3
Graham Farmer	Western Australia	2	2
Frank Adams	Victoria	2	2
Neil Kerley	South Australia	2	2
Colin Moore	Tasmania	1	1
Derek Chadwick	Western Australia	1	1
Bob Withers	Tasmania	1	1
