= Bob Shearman =

Australian Rules footballer

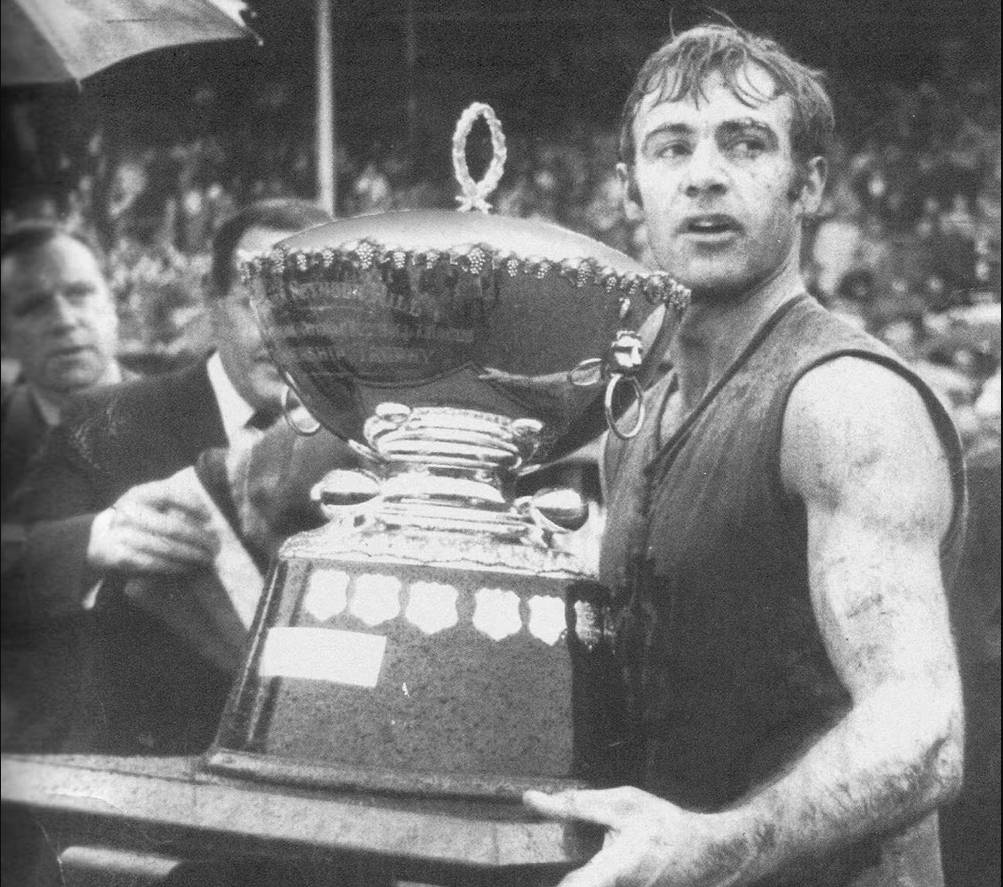
- Shearman holding the SANFL premiership trophy following Sturt’s 1970 grand-final victory.

Personal information
- Full name: Robert Osborne Shearman
- Born: 14 September 1939
- Died: 27 June 1999 (aged 59); Macinaggio, Corsica
- Original team: Aberfeldie
- Height: 178 cm (5 ft 10 in)
- Weight: 82 kg (181 lb)

Playing career^{1}
Years	Club	Games (Goals)
1956–1960	Essendon	64 (8)
1961–1964	West Torrens	70 (90)
1966–1972	Sturt	121 (92)
Total		255 (190)

Representative team honours
Years	Team	Games (Goals)
1961 - 1964	South Australia	13
- ^{1} Playing statistics correct to the end of 1972.

Career highlights
- 5× SANFL Premiership player: 1966, 1967, 1968(ac), 1969(c), 1970(c); South Australian Football Hall of Fame: 2002; Sturt Team of the Century; Sturt Football Club Hall of Fame: 2004; 13× South Australian State Team: 1961, 1962(c), 1963(c), 1964(c); 7× The Advertiser SANFL Team of the Year: 1961, 1962, 1963, 1964, 1966, 1968, 1969; Member of The Advertiser SANFL Golden Jubilee Team (1952 - 2002); All-Australian team: 1961; West Torrens Captain: 1962-64; Sturt Football Club Captain: 1969-72; 5AW South Australian Footballer of the Year Award: 1962; Simpson Medal: 1964; 2× Craven Filter Champion Kick of Australia: 1968, 1971; Jack Oatey Vintage 21 Team (Vice Captain)

Robert Osborne Shearman (14 September 1939 – 27 June 1999) was an Australian Rules footballer who played for the Essendon Football Club in the Victorian Football League (VFL) and for the West Torrens Football Club and Sturt Football Club in the South Australian National Football League (SANFL).

He was widely acknowledged as one of the most exceptional and versatile footballers of his time, noted for his strength, intelligence, and ability to play in any position on the field.

"Shearman was known for his drop kicking ability and played primarily as a centreman and half-back flanker."

Furthermore, his bravery and leadership were celebrated, as evidenced by his captaincy roles at West Torrens, Sturt, and the South Australian state team.

Throughout his career, Shearman garnered numerous accolades including playing in two VFL Grand Finals by the age of 20, being a part of five premiership-winning teams in the SANFL, three as captain, serving as club captain for two clubs whilst making 13 appearances for the state of South Australia. He also captained the state team in 1962, 1963, and 1964, was selected for the All Australian team in 1961, and was awarded the Simpson Medal as the best player in the 1964 interstate carnival.

Following his career, Shearman was posthumously inducted as an inaugural member into the South Australian Football Hall of Fame in 2002 and the Sturt Football Club Hall of Fame in 2004. Additionally, he was named as a member of Sturt's Team of the Century.

== Footballing career ==
=== Essendon Football Club ===
Born in Melbourne, Shearman was recruited from the local Aberfeldie club in the Essendon District League after having won the Best and Fairest award in the Essendon District Football League Under 17s in 1955.

Shearman became one of the youngest players to ever play league football and the then youngest ever Essendon player to debut with Essendon in 1956, at just 16 years of age, showcasing his talent amongst much older players in taking strong marks and executing prodigious drop kicks.

His debut came in a win against South Melbourne in round 17, 1956 and led to an Essendon official quote that Shearman was "just like Dick Reynolds when he first came to us!" In the following game against Geelong, Shearman was labelled Essendon's find of the season, and received a tremendous ovation upon kicking his first goal for the club.

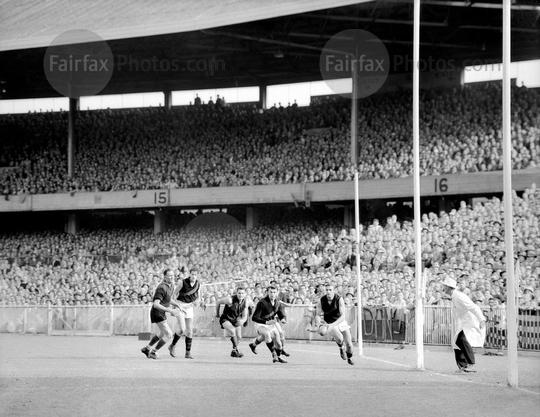
Bob Shearman (Essendon) with the ball during the 1959 VFL Grand Final against Melbourne.

His role as a half-back flanker, highlighted by his aerial prowess and skills at ground level, played a pivotal role in Essendon's progression to the Grand Finals of 1957 and 1959.

These matches attracted crowds of over 100,000 spectators, with Shearman standing out as the youngest player on the field during the 1957 Grand Final, just one week after turning 18 making him one of the youngest players in history to have played in a VFL/AFL Grand Final.

Despite Essendon's defeats to Melbourne on both occasions, Shearman's performances established him as a crowd favourite, earning him recognition as one of the best players in each game.

=== West Torrens Football Club ===
In 1961, Shearman followed the request of his Essendon coach, Dick Reynolds, to leave Melbourne and head to South Australia to join him at the West Torrens Football Club.

He quickly established himself as one of the best players in the league and at the age of 21 was appointed captain in just his second year at the club that included football greats such as Lindsay Head. He remained captain until his decision to seek a transfer to Sturt at the end of the 1964 season. Shearman played 70 games and kicked 90 goals for the Eagles.

Whilst also just 21 he represented South Australia at the 1961 Brisbane carnival, where he was selected in the All-Australian team in his first year in the SANFL.

He captained West Torrens in 1962, 1963 and 1964 and won the prestigious 5AD Footballer of the Year Award in 1962 in his first year as captain of the club. Shearman was also named in the SANFL Team of the Year by South Australia's premier newspaper, The Advertiser in each of his four years at the club.

=== Sturt Football Club ===
In the aftermath of Sturt's 1964 Preliminary Final loss to South Adelaide, legendary Sturt coach Jack Oatey told Chairman Ray Kutcher that "if you get me Shearman, I'll get you a premiership".

Coinciding with Dick Reynolds' retirement as coach of West Torrens at the end of the 1963 season, Shearman's eagerness to transfer to the Double Blues at the end of the 1964 SANFL season led him to him taking the decision to abstain from football for the entire 1965 SANFL season in order to secure the clearance from West Torrens.

Shearman will always be remembered for his unrivalled prodigious kicking.

After finishing as runners-up to Port Adelaide in 1965, the Double Blues decisively defeated the Magpies by 56 points in the 1966 Grand Final, claiming their first flag in 26 years.

Sturt continued to claim premierships in 1967, 1968, 1969, and 1970, achieving an almost record-breaking five consecutive titles.

Shearman led the Double Blues as acting captain in the 1968 grand final victory and served as captain from 1969 until his retirement in 1972, earning widespread respect for his leadership, bravery, and skill.

Over his tenure at Sturt, he played 121 games and scored 92 goals, becoming a fan favourite for his unmatched kicking prowess. Additionally, his versatility allowed him to play in any position on the field.

He won the Craven Filter Champion Kick of Australia competition twice within its five-year duration and could kick over 80 metres with both feet. He was also again named in the SANFL team of the Year by The Advertiser newspaper in 1966 and then in 1968 and 1969.

Shearman was later listed as a member of coach, Jack Oatey's Vintage 21 highlighting the best players in his era as coach. He was also honoured as a member of Sturt's Team of the Century in the half-back flank position and was inducted as an inaugural member of the Sturt Hall of Fame in 2004.

Post his playing career, Shearman spent five years as a commentator on Channel Nine’s live Reserves telecasts. He also coached Sturt’s seconds in 1978 and Woodville’s twos in 1979-80.

== State Representation ==
Shearman was selected to represent South Australia in his debut year within the SANFL league, and his performance in the carnival led to his inclusion in the All Australian team. He captained South Australia in 1962, 1963, and 1964, playing 13 games for the state. His tenure as captain of South Australia is highlighted by the famous 1963 victory at the MCG against Victoria, which ended a 37-year drought. The Australian Football website describes this triumph as "one of the finest efforts by a South Australian team in an interstate clash", and marks it as "the day South Australian football came of age."

Under Shearman's leadership, the team secured a hard-earned seven-point victory over a Victorian side that boasted an array of legendary players, including Polly Farmer, Bob Skilton, Darrel Baldock, Ron Barassi and John Nicholls, in front of nearly 60,000 spectators. The South Australian team, coached by Fos Williams, featured notable players such as Lindsay Head, John Halbert and Neil Kerley.

Upon their return to Adelaide, the victorious team was greeted by more than 8,000 fans, celebrating their significant achievement. This victory is still rated as one of the finest efforts by a South Australian team in an interstate clash.

In 1964 he was awarded the Simpson Medal as the game's best player in the interstate match against Western Australia.

== Personal life ==
Shearman was married to Francine, a leading fashion and photographic model between 1957 and the mid-1970s, businesswoman, and the first female television presenter for the Channel 9 Football Show. They had two children, Scott and Danielle.

Shearman died suddenly on 27 June 1999 whilst in Corsica. His Adelaide memorial service was conducted by his former five-time premiership-winning team-mate, the Reverend Keith Chessell at St Augustine’s Anglican Church in Unley.

== Legacy ==
Shearman is widely regarded as one of the most outstanding players and leaders of his era, as well as being among the most pivotal figures in the history of South Australian football, particularly within the Sturt Football Club. He was listed as a member of The Advertiser SANFL Golden Jubilee Team (1952 - 2002) and his contributions were formally recognised with his induction into the South Australian Football Hall of Fame in 2002, as well as the Sturt Hall of Fame and the Team of the Century. Additionally, the SANFL honoured him by naming the R.O. Shearman Medal after him.

Since its inception in 2000, the R.O. Shearman Medal which is awarded to the League's best player for the season as voted for by the League's senior coaches on a 5-4-3-2-1 basis for the best players in each game of the home-and-away season. This medal is considered one of the most prestigious individual accolades in the SANFL.

Jeff Pash, a highly esteemed former footballer and football journalist, commented on Shearman, noting:

The beauty of Shearman’s game is that, for all the thrill of anticipation that visibly runs through the ..... crowd when he gets the ball (‘How far this time?’) he, too, visibly sums up the situation before taking action. If he is hotly pressed he can pick the handball gap as surely as the best. He is quite at home in the short game with either foot, and he can choose cleverly from his immense drop kicking range. He is not one of those footballer’s with the predictable response.

The former chief football writer of The Advertiser (from 1979–89), and former West Torrens five-time leading goalkicker and 1961 All-Australian, Geoff Kingston, said that “Bob Shearman was a fierce competitor”, and that "he was tough, hard, and strong. He would hurt you in a tackle”.

== Bibliography ==
- Holmesby, Russell; Main, Jim (2011). The Encyclopedia of AFL Footballers: Every AFL/VFL Player Since 1897 (9th ed.). Seaford: Bas Publishing. ISBN 978-1-921496-12-7.
- Lysikatos, John (1995). Cornwall, Peter (ed.). TRUE BLUE: The History of the Sturt Football Club. Unley: Sturt Football Club. ISBN 0-9592687-1-5.
