= Tasmanian Football Hall of Fame =

Australian rules football hall of fame

Coordinates: 41°25′33″S 147°08′20″E

The Tasmanian Football Hall of Fame was established to help recognise outstanding services and overall contribution made to the sport of Australian rules football in Tasmania. Any participant of the sport, including players, umpires, media personalities and coaches, may be inducted. A physical hall was established in 2005 after the Tasmanian Community Fund provided a $50,000 grant to assist AFL Tasmania and the Launceston City Council with establishment of a permanent facility at York Park. The decision to locate the Hall of Fame at the ground was because the site had recently been redeveloped and was positioned as the "true home of Tasmanian football". AFL Tasmania initiated the Hall of Fame nomination process, with a number of clubs, players and grounds nominated and accepted into the Hall of Fame since 2005. The public Hall of Fame opened to the public on Saturday 21 February 2009.

The induction criteria were expanded in 2007, allowing "The Gravel" Oval of Queenstown to be honoured.

Other inductees have included Roy Cazaly, Paul Sproule, Verdun Howell, Paul Williams, Brent Crosswell and the Smithton 'Saints' Football Club.

== 2005 – Inductees ==
The 'Icons' of Tasmanian Football are listed in bold

- Gordon Abbott
- Matthew Armstrong
- Noel Atkins
- Jim Atkinson
- Roy Bailey
- **Darrel Baldock**
- Vic Barwick
- Bill Berryman
- John Bingley
- Hugh Cameron
- **Bruce Carter**
- **Terry Cashion**
- **Roy Cazaly**
- George Challis
- Jack Charlesworth
- John Chick
- Bert Chilcott
- Don Clark
- Scott Clayton
- Neil Conlan
- Jock Connell
- Roy Cooper
- Berkley Cox
- Daryn Cresswell
- **Brent Crosswell**
- Peter Daniel
- Craig Davis
- Col Deane
- John Devine
- Jack Donnelly
- Ian Drake
- Jack Dunn
- Brian Eade
- **Rodney Eade**
- Darrell Eaton
- Steven Febey
- Terry Fellows
- Bill Fielding
- Adrian Fletcher
- Peter Floyd
- Brendon Gale
- Don Gale
- Michael Gale
- Jack Gardiner
- Rex Garwood
- **Horrie Gorringe**
- David Grant
- Graeme Hamley
- **Royce Hart**
- Pat Hartnett
- Jack Hawksley
- Jack Hill
- **Arthur Hodgson**
- **Verdun Howell**
- Paul Hudson
- **Peter Hudson**
- Eric Huxtable
- Des James
- Tassie Johnson
- Peter Jones
- **Tim Lane**
- Barry Lawrence
- Noel Leary
- Graeme Lee
- **John Leedham**
- Allan Leeson
- Allan Leitch
- Trevor Leo
- Greg Lethborg
- Danny Ling
- Geoff Long
- Harry Long
- Brian Lowe
- Gavin Luttrell
- **Alastair Lynch**
- Les Manson
- Peter Marquis
- **Paddy Martin**
- Horrie Mason
- Leo McAuley
- Fred McGinis
- Kevin McLean
- Jack McMurray, Jr.
- Stephen MacPherson
- Jack Metherell
- Bob Miller
- George Miller
- Colin Moore
- **Laurie Nash**
- Robert Neal
- Gavin O'Dea
- Ian Paton
- Burnie Payne
- Geoff Poulter
- Fred Pringle
- Darrin Pritchard
- Len Pye
- Vern Rae
- Alan Rait
- Trevor Ranson
- **Matthew Richardson**
- **Michael Roach**
- Colin Robertson
- Jim Ross
- Jack Rough
- Alan Scott
- Don Scott
- Lerrel Sharp
- Robert Shaw
- Fred Smith
- Hec Smith
- Ricky Smith
- Stuart Spencer
- **Paul Sproule**
- **Ian Stewart**
- Barry Strange
- Raynor 'Rattler' Summers
- Darryl Sutton
- Algy Tynan
- Viv Valentine
- George Viney
- Paddy Walsh
- Peter Walsh
- **Ivor Warne-Smith**
- Keith Welsh
- Paul Williams
- Greg Wilson
- Bob Withers
- Graeme Wright
- Eric Zschech

== 2006 – Inductees ==
- Simon Atkins
- Bill Atwell
- Doug Barwick
- Ray Biffin
- Chris Bond
- Noel Clarke
- Garry Davidson
- Keith Dickenson
- John Fitzallen
- Jack Hinds
- Graham Hunnibell
- Nigel Hyland
- Joe Littler
- Ellis Maney
- Tony Martyn
- Ernie Matthews
- Warren McCarthy
- David McQuestin
- Kerry O'Neill
- Bob Parsons
- Neil Rawson
- Noel Reid
- Graeme Saltmarsh
- Garth Smith
- Ray Stokes
- Ted Turner
- Ronald Tyson
- Scott Wade
- Athol Webb
- Ian Westell
- Jim 'Dodger' Williams
- Tony 'Chang' Young

== 2007 – Inductees ==
- Ken Austin
- Andy Bennett
- Max Brown
- Noel Carter
- Dale Chugg
- Athol Cooper
- Chris Fagan
- Martin Flanagan
- Wayne Fox
- Les Fyle
- John Greening
- Ivan Hayes
- Len Hayes
- Scott Jeffery
- Steane Kremerskothen
- William Leitch
- Gary Linton
- James Manson
- Danny Noonan
- Wally Ride
- Roy Ringrose
- Jamie Shanahan
- David Stockdale
- George Vautin
- Royce Viney
- Graeme Wilkinson

== 2008 – Inductees ==
- Ben Atkin
- Kevin Bailey
- John Bonney
- Colin Campbell
- Lance Crosswell
- Harold Dowling
- Robbie Dykes
- Tim Evans
- Steve Goulding
- Ron Hall
- Les Hepper
- Nathan Howard
- Ray James
- Andy Lovell
- Graeme Mackey
- Neil Maynard
- Don McLeod
- Keith Roberts
- Graeme Shephard
- Col Stokes
- Charlie Thompson
- Darren Trevena
- Kevin Williams
- Mark Williams

== 2009 – Inductees ==
- Grant Allford
- Bob Beakley
- Gordon Bowman
- Stephen Carey
- Harry Coventry
- Gary Dawson
- Mike Delanty
- Grant Fagan
- Matthew Febey
- Des Graham
- Michael Hunnibell
- David Langmaid
- Wendell Langmaid
- Tom Lee
- Jim Manson
- John McCarthy
- Chris Reynolds
- Hedley Rooke
- Roger Steele
- Kevin Symons
- Gary Williamson
- Darren Winter

== 2010 – Inductees ==
- Fred Davies
- Kerry Good
- Brad Green
- Ray Groom
- Ricky Hanlon
- Brady Rawlings
- Chris Riewoldt
- Russell Robertson
- Peter Sharp
- Michael Styles
- Hedley Thompson
- Albert Waddle

== 2011 – Inductees ==
- Steve Beaumont
- Gavin Cooney
- Graham Fox
- Max Griffiths
- Ben Harrison
- Len Lewis
- Harry McDonald
- Simon Minton-Connell
- Trent Nichols
- Tony Pickett
- Lindsay Webb
- Wayne Wing

== 2012 – Inductees ==
- Paul Vinar
- Roger Browning
- Derek Peardon
- Rod Butler
- Ian Marsh
- Peter Johnston
- Mark "Bill" Williams
- Peter Roozendaal
- Darryn Perry
- Jade Rawlings

== 2013 – Inductees ==
- Trent Bartlett
- Geoff Hill
- Jamie Dennis
- Bill Sorell
- Wayne Youd
- John Heathcote
- Leigh McConnon
- Tony Maguire
- Brodie Holland
- Chris Jones

== 2014 – Inductees ==
- Ron Marney
- Vern O'Byrne
- Kevin King
- Barry Walker
- Tony Browning
- Stephen Nichols
- Peter King
- Cameron Clayton
- John Klug
- Daniel Hulm

== 2015 – Inductees ==
- Harold 'Nunky' Ayers
- Mal Pascoe
- Roy Apted
- Jim Leitch
- Kerry Doran
- Andrew Vanderfeen
- Roland Curley
- Dion Scott
- Scott McCallum
- Ben Beams

== 2016 – Inductees ==
- Trevor Best
- Ken Lette
- Terry Morris
- Michael Seddon
- David Noble
- Robert Groenewegen
- Nick Probert
- Brendon Bolton
- Ian Callinan
- Grant Birchall

== 2018 – Inductees ==
- Vic Belcher
- Greg Moline
- Vic Castles
- Maurie Sankey
- Dennis Powell
- Athol Hodgetts
- Bill Trethewie
- Mitch Lefevre
- Luke Crane
- Jack Riewoldt

== See also ==
- Queenstown Oval, Tasmania
