= Hardtop (disambiguation) =

Hardtop is a rigid automobile roof.

Hardtop may also refer to:

- Hardtop (Transformers), a Transformers character
- Hardtop (G.I. Joe), a fictional character in the G.I. Joe universe
- Donny "Hardtop" Brooks, a character from COPS (animated TV series)
- Mini Hardtop, a supermini car
