= Eric Richardson =

Eric Richardson may refer to:

- Eric Richardson (Australian footballer) (1891–1969), Australian rules footballer
- Eric Richardson (American football) (born 1962), American wide receiver
