= Bruce Armstrong (disambiguation) =

Bruce Armstrong is the name of several people including:

- Bruce Armstrong (born 1965), American former professional football player who played for New England Patriots
- Bruce Armstrong (Australian footballer) (1943–2004), Australian rules footballer who played for Essendon
- Bruce Armstrong (epidemiologist) (born 1944), Australian academic and cancer researcher
- Bruce Armstrong (sculptor), (1957–2024), Australian sculptor, painter, printer and charcoal artist
