= Joe Littler =

Australian rules footballer

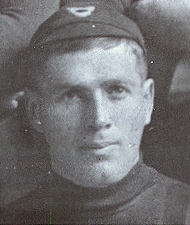

Personal information
- Full name: Harold Kennedy Littler
- Born: 17 July 1879; Launceston, Tasmania
- Died: 10 December 1956 (aged 77); Wynyard, Tasmania

Playing career^{1}
Years	Club	Games (Goals)
1897–98, 1908	Launceston	
1899–1902, 1904–07	Mersey	
1903	South Melbourne	10 (9)
1910	City (Launceston)	
1911–23, 1925–32	Wynyard	
- ^{1} Playing statistics correct to the end of 1932.

Harold Kennedy "Joe" Littler (17 July 1879 – 10 December 1956) was an Australian rules footballer who played for South Melbourne in the Victorian Football League (VFL). He also had a long career in Tasmania playing in the Northern Tasmanian Football Association, North West Football Union (NWFU), and the North West Football Association (NWFA).

Littler was a premiership player in his debut season at Launceston, as an 18-year-old in 1897. He spent the following NTFA season at Launceston but then crossed to NWFA club Mersey and captained their 1899 premiership team and participated in two further premierships before attempting a VFL career.

Signed up South Melbourne, Littler kicked a couple of goals on his debut, a win over Essendon, but didn't experience another victory in the rest of the nine matches that he played in the 1903 VFL season. One of those, a loss to Melbourne at the MCG, is noted for South Melbourne's inaccurate score line of 3.17 and the fact that Littler kicked all three of those goals.

He resumed as Mersey captain in 1904 and the following year experienced another premiership in the NWFA. Launceston lured him back to their club in 1908, the same year that he returned to the mainly briefly to represent Tasmania at the Melbourne Carnival.

Littler spent 1909 as an umpire in the Zeehan District Football Association. In 1910 he returned to Launceston and played with City in another NTFA premiership team. At an age where many players would retire, Littler began a 20-year stint at Wynyard which included a further three premierships. He spent the 1924 season as captain of Yeoman.

In 1932 Wynyard were short of players for an NWFU roster match. Littler, secretary of the club at the time, came out of retirement for the day to help make up the numbers, thus playing a senior first-class match at the age of 52.

He was, in 2006, inducted into the Tasmanian Football Hall of Fame.

== See also ==
- 1908 Melbourne Carnival
