= Grant Allford =

Australian rules footballer (born 1950)

Personal information
- Full name: Grant Allford
- Born: 5 December 1950 (age 75)
- Original team: Latrobe
- Height: 184 cm (6 ft 0 in)
- Weight: 80 kg (176 lb)
- Position: Defender

Playing career^{1}
| Years | Club | Games (Goals) |
| 1971–73 | Richmond | 30 (1) |
- ^{1} Playing statistics correct to the end of 1973.

Grant Allford (born 5 December 1950) is a former Australian rules footballer who played for Richmond in the Victorian Football League (VFL) during the early 1970s.

Allford, a defender, came to the VFL from Tasmanian club Latrobe. He made his debut in round 15 and played every game for the rest of the year, including the Preliminary Final loss to St Kilda. Over the next two seasons, he added 20 more games but was unable to establish a place in the team.

Later in the decade, Allford played at Launceston and won the 1980 Hec Smith Memorial Medal as the best and fairest player in the Northern Tasmanian Football Association. He was, in 2009, inducted into the Tasmanian Football Hall of Fame.
