= Darrell Eaton =

Australian rules footballer

Darrel Norman Eaton (c. 1927 – 22 January 2007) was an Australian rules footballer who played for various senior clubs in Tasmania between 1947 and 1957 and also represented the state at three successive national carnivals.

Eaton began his senior career with North Hobart in the Tasmanian Football League early in the 1947 season. He was so successful that later in the year he was chosen in the squad chosen to represent the state at the 1947 Hobart Carnival

Eaton continued over the next few years to make his mark in the TFL with North Hobart and was chosen to represent the state at the 1950 Brisbane Carnival

In late 1951 it was announced that Eaton would move to the North West Football Union having been appointed coach of Wynyard. Immediately successful, he led the team to the 1952 premiership, and was re-appointed coach.

His career continued to prosper and for the third time Eaton was chosen in the squad to represent the state on the national stage, this time at the 1953 Adelaide Carnival

He was inducted into the Tasmanian Football Hall of Fame in 2005.
