= Harry Mort =

Australian rules footballer, born 1906

Personal information
- Full name: Alton Harry Mort
- Born: 24 March 1906; Parkside, South Australia
- Died: 23 December 1981 (aged 75); Gisborne, Victoria

Playing career^{1}
Years	Club	Games (Goals)
1928–29	Hawthorn	7 (2)
- ^{1} Playing statistics correct to the end of 1929.

Alton Harry Mort (24 March 1906 – 23 December 1981) was an Australian rules footballer who played with Hawthorn in the Victorian Football League (VFL).

He later served in the RAAF in World War II.

His son, Ian Mort played with Hawthorn between 1960 and 1964.
