= Noel Atkins =

Australian rules footballer

Noel William Atkins (17 October 1925 – 5 December 2015) was an Australian rules footballer, who played for various senior clubs in Tasmania between 1945 and 1959. He also represented the state several times in interstate matches, and was inducted into the Tasmanian Football Hall of Fame in 2005.

Atkins played for Hobart in the Tasmanian Football League (TFL), North Launceston and Launceston in the Northern Tasmanian Football Association (NTFA), and East Devonport in the North West Football Union (NWFU).
