= Paul Atkins (Australian footballer) =

Australian rules footballer (1968–2026)

Personal information
- Full name: Paul Atkins
- Born: 23 December 1968
- Died: 11 July 2026 (aged 57); Wynyard, Tasmania, Australia
- Original team: Burnie Hawks
- Height: 180 cm (5 ft 11 in)
- Weight: 90 kg (198 lb)

Playing career
Years	Club	Games (Goals)
1992	Sydney	2 (0)

Paul Atkins (23 December 1968 – 11 July 2026) was an Australian rules footballer who played two games for the Sydney Swans in the 1992 AFL season. He had a similar build to his twin brother Simon Atkins who was a successful player at Footscray, the club with which Paul had originally tried out. He was recruited from Burnie Hawks in Tasmania. He played at the Wynyard Football Club.

== 1992 AFL season ==
Atkins wore the number 32 jumper for the Sydney Swans in the 1992 AFL season and it took until Round 23 for Atkins to make his debut against the Brisbane Bears at Carrara. The Bears were a struggling team that finished on the bottom of the ladder in 1992. Atkins had seven kicks and 10 handballs in a losing Sydney side. He also played the following week against Richmond at the SCG. Atkins had 11 disposals, of which eight were handballs.

== North Launceston ==
Atkins was appointed coach of Tasmanian State League club North Launceston before the start of the 2010 season and was seeking to get North Launceston back into the finals. The club last won a premiership in 1998. The side was inconsistent throughout the season, although a memorable victory over Glenorchy was one of the highlights of the season. North Launceston finished sixth after the home and away season and lost a close Elimination Final to North Hobart at North Hobart Oval to finish sixth. Atkins was not reappointed for the 2011 season.

== Death ==
Atkins died in a traffic collision in Wynyard, Tasmania, on 11 July 2026, at the age of 57.
