= Bert Chilcott =

Australian rules footballer

Albert Thomas Chilcott (20 May 1918 – 27 April 1992) was an Australian rules footballer who played senior club football in Tasmania from the late 1930s to the early 1950s and was chosen in competition and state representative teams a number of times.

== Early life and career ==
Chilcott was born and grew up in the country district of Bracknell in Northern Tasmania. He played with the local club in the Esk Association and was a member of the 1937 premiership team.

== Senior football in the NTFA ==
Chilcott played with Longford in the Northern Tasmanian Football Association competition from 1938 to 1941. He was a member of the team which lost the 1940 Grand Final to Launceston. During this period Chilcott, a strongly built ruckman (180cm, 95kg) was regularly chosen in the NTFA side to play intrastate representative matches.

After serving in the Army during World War II Chilcott switched clubs and joined North Launceston playing from 1945 to 1951.

His consistently good form kept him under selection notice in this era and he was regularly chosen for the NTFA representative side.

Country club Hagley appointed Chilcott playing coach for the 1952 season and he guided them to the Esk Association premiership. However, his season wasn’t finished and he returned to North Launceston late in the 1952 season to play in the NTFA finals series.

== State selection ==
Chilcott was chosen in the Tasmanian squad of 25 players to prepare for matches at the 1947 Hobart Carnival. He played in matches against Queensland, New South Wales and Western Australia.

Bert Chilcott was inducted into the Tasmanian Football Hall of Fame in 2005.
