= Ivan Hayes =

Australian rules footballer

Ivan John Hayes (born about 1937) is a former Australian rules footballer who played in Tasmania during the 1950s and 1960s. He represented the state several times in interstate matches including the Brisbane Carnival in 1961. He was inducted into the Tasmanian Football Hall of Fame in 2007.

== Early career ==
Hayes lived near Exeter on the West Tamar and began his football career with that club as a teenager. In 1954 he was a member of the club's premiership team and was also awarded a trophy for being the association's leading goalkicker.

== Longford ==
Hayes played for Longford in the Northern Tasmanian Football Association (NTFA) from 1956 to 1966.

He was a member of the club's premiership teams in 1957 and 1958, and also played in the NTFA Grand Finals of 1959, 1961, 1962 and 1963.

Ivan Hayes won Longford's Best and Fairest award in 1958.

== Personal life ==
Hayes had a long working career with the Hydro-Electric Commission in Tasmania, being a linesman for many years.
