= Alan Crawford (Australian rules footballer) =

Australian rules footballer (1916–1988)

Personal information
- Full name: Allan William Thomas Crawford
- Born: 21 January 1916; Nathalia, Victoria
- Died: 28 March 1988 (aged 72)
- Original team: Carlton seconds
- Height: 187 cm (6 ft 2 in)
- Weight: 92 kg (203 lb)

Playing career^{1}
Years	Club	Games (Goals)
1936–1938	North Melbourne	13 (7)
1939–1941	South Adelaide	
1943–1945	North Melbourne	47 (23)
1946	Launceston	
1947	Penguin	
1948–1949	North Melbourne	17 (9)
- ^{1} Playing statistics correct to the end of 1949.

Allan William Thomas "Alan" Crawford (21 January 1916 – 28 March 1988) was an Australian rules footballer who played with North Melbourne in the Victorian Football League (VFL).

== Career ==
Crawford, a former Carlton seconds player, had a stop-start career in the VFL, starting with a stint from 1936 to 1938. During the early war years he played for South Adelaide, then went back to North Melbourne in 1943. A follower, Crawford won North Melbourne's best and fairest award in 1944. He was playing coach of Launceston in 1946 and coached another Tasmanian club, Penguin, in 1947, before returning to North Melbourne in 1948, for two final seasons.
