= COPS (animated TV series) =

1988 American animated television series

- Also known as: CyberCOPS
- Genre: Police procedural
- Developed by: Bruce Shelly
- Directed by: Kevin Altieri
- Voices of: Ken Ryan; John Stocker; Len Carlson; Elizabeth Hanna; Ray James; Darrin Baker; Peter Keleghan; Ron Rubin; Jane Schoettle; Brent Titcomb; Paulina Gillis; Mary Long; Paul De La Rosa; Nick Nichols; Marvin Goldhar; Dan Hennessey
- Countries of origin: Canada; United States
- Original language: English
- No. of seasons: 1
- No. of episodes: 65

Production
- Executive producer: Andy Heyward
- Producer: Richard Raynis
- Running time: 22 minutes
- Production companies: DIC Animation City; Crawleys Animation

Original release
- Network: Syndication
- Release: September 19 – December 16, 1988

C.O.P.S. (Central Organization of Police Specialists) is a 1988 animated television series released by DIC Animation City, and distributed by Claster Television. The series focuses on a team of highly trained police officers tasked with protecting the fictional Empire City from a group of gangsters led by the "Big Boss". The tag lines for the series are "Fighting crime in a future time" and "It's crime fightin' time!" In 1993, the series was shown in reruns on CBS Saturday mornings under the new name CyberCOPS, due to the 1989 debut of the unrelated primetime reality show of the same name. The show was based on Hasbro's 1988 line of action figures called C.O.P.S. 'n' Crooks, which were designed by Bart Sears.

== Overview ==
"C.O.P.S. Central Organization of Police Specialists. Fighting crime in a future time. Protecting Empire City from Big Boss and his gang of crooks!"

— Bulletproof's opening narration.

In the near future, Brandon "Big Boss" Babel and his gang of crooks are causing crime to run rampant in Empire City enough for the Empire City Police Department to be unable to stop him.

Mayor Davis requests federal assistance. The FBI sends in Special Agent Baldwin P. Vess (Codename: Bulletproof) to help take down Big Boss, but Vess suffers serious injuries in a car wreck during a fight with Big Boss' criminal henchmen and has to be taken to the hospital. Mayor Davis appoints Vess as the new chief of police of Empire city. Facing years of rehabilitation, Vess is outfitted with a cybernetic bulletproof torso that allows him to walk again.

While staying at the hospital, Bulletproof sends out Empire City police officer P.J. O'Malley (Codename: LongArm) and rookie officer Donny Brooks (Codename: Hardtop) to round up the best law enforcers from all over the country. With these men and women consisting of David E. "Highway" Harlson, Colt "Mace" Howards, Stan "Barricade" Hyde, Tina "Mainframe" Cassidy, Walker "Sundown" Calhoun, Suzie "Mirage" Young, Hugh S. "Bullseye" Forward, and Rex "Bowser" Pointer and his robot dog, Blitz, he forms a team that is "the finest law enforcement agency there is in the country". Bulletproof becomes the proud founder and commander of COPS. Together, he and his COPS team are able to take down Big Boss and his gang of crooks and thwart the first of many of Big Boss' criminal schemes.

Each episode has a title that begins with "The Case of..." with a different phrase being added to it (e.g. "The Case of the Iron C.O.P.S. and Wooden CROOKS"; "The Case of the Half-Pint Hero"; and "The Case of the Crime Nobody Heard") along with the COPS file number. Bulletproof would narrate at the beginning of the episode as well as at the end, concluding by repeating the COPS file number and title, ending it with "Case Closed" with a "Closed" mark being stamped onto the file folder. The two exceptions are the first parts of each of the two-part episodes, "The Case of Big Boss' Master Plan" and "The Case of C.O.P.S. File #1", where the conclusion of the episode is marked with a "Case Continued" plastered on the files.

In the cartoon, the COPS frequently shouted, "It's crime fighting time!" as a battle cry when it was time to bag the CROOKS and solve a caper. Meanwhile, the CROOKS would shout "Crime's a-wasting!" whenever they went to do another caper, whether it was pulling another heist (as in so many episodes such as "The Case of the Blur Bandits"), giving C.O.P.S. a hard time to the point of replacing (actually disposing) them for good (as in "The Case of the Big Boss' Master Plan") or taking captive a certain individual to be held prisoner for ransom (as in "The Case of the Ransomed Rascal").

The music for the series was created by Shuki Levy, while the COPS theme music was written and composed by Haim Saban.

Numerous characters were featured in the cartoon that did not have action figures (including Mainframe, Brian O'Malley, Whitney Morgan, Nightshade, Ms. Demeanor, and Mirage).

== Characters ==
=== C.O.P.S. ===
C.O.P.S. is short for Central Organization of Police Specialists. They were assembled in order to combat C.R.O.O.K.S. and other bad guys. Its known members include:

- Baldwin P. "Bulletproof" Vess (voiced by Ken Ryan): The leader of COPS and the only COP to appear in every single episode, Baldwin P. Vess is an FBI agent who was called in to help take down Big Boss. During the fight, he ends up seriously injured in a car wreck and is taken to the hospital. To save his life, Mayor Davis had the research scientists from the Overdine Institute perform an operation that gives Baldwin a cybernetic torso to save his life as it would take years for his torso to recover. Going by the name "Bulletproof" due to the cybernetic torso being able to deflect bullets, Baldwin assembles a team of highly trained police officers from across the country to form COPS and stop Big Boss and his gang of crooks with Baldwin becoming the group's chief of police of Empire City. His cybernetic torso is computer-compatible as seen when he accessed the computer on Big Boss's Ultimate Crime Machine to stop it from crashing into Empire City as seen in "The Case of C.O.P.S File 1" Part 2 and is able to carry a six-pack of small electronic grenades as seen in "The Case of the Bogus Justice Machines". He is representative of a Police Detective or an F.B.I. Agent. The catchphrase he often says is "It's Crime Fighting time!"
- P.J. "LongArm" O'Malley (voiced by John Stocker) serves as a police sergeant for the Empire City Police Department. Second-in-command of COPS, he is a very compassionate officer who has the talent to convince juvenile delinquents to give up their criminal ways and become law-abiding citizens. He wears a wrist device that extends out a handcuff-like device to grab criminals escaping the law, or as an improvised grappling hook. LongArm is representative of a beat cop. Long arm has a wife and a son named Brian.
- Rex "Bowser" Pointer (voiced by Nick Nichols) is a police officer who worked for the Chicago Police Department, he loves animals and is the handler of Blitz. Bowser is representative of a K-9 officer.
  - Blitz is Bowser's robot dog who thinks like a human being.
- Walker "Sundown" Calhoun (voiced by Len Carlson) is a former Texas Sheriff that often wears a cowboy hat, he is an excellent lasso handler and sharpshooter known for conducting special investigations. Sundown is representative of a Texas Ranger.
- Susie "Mirage" Young (voiced by Elizabeth Hanna) is a female police officer who worked with the San Francisco Police Department, she is known for her talented work in undercover investigations. Mirage is representative of a vice officer.
- Sgt. Colt "Mace" Howards (voiced by Len Carlson) is a police sergeant who worked for the S.W.A.T. Philadelphia Police Department, he is known for his tactical strategies, his laser "Mazooka", and his love for a femme fatale named Nightshade. Mace is representative of a S.W.A.T. officer.
- Dave E. "Highway" Harlson (voiced by Ray James) is a police officer who worked for the California Highway Patrol, he is a known ace cycle trooper who is not good at baking cookies. Highway is representative of a motorcycle patrol officer.
- Stan "Barricade" Hyde (voiced by Ray James) is a soft-spoken police officer who worked for the Detroit Metro, he is known for his calm demeanor, his M.U.L.E. device, and crowd control. Barricade is representative of Riot Control. He also seems to have training in hostage negotiation.
- Donny "Hardtop" Brooks (voiced by Darrin Baker) is a rookie police officer who works for Empire City's Police Department, he is the driver of the COPS' Ironsides vehicle and has a crush on ECTV news reporter Whitney Morgan. Hardtop is representative of a patrol and pursuit officer.
- Hugh S. "Bullseye" Forward (voiced by Peter Keleghan) is a police officer who worked for the Miami Police Department, he is the best helicopter pilot on the force which earned him the nickname "Bullseye".
- Tina "Mainframe" Cassidy (voiced by Mary Long) is a police computer specialist who works for Empire City's Police Department, she is the best computer jockey ever whose talent in computer wizardry has helped solve even the most chaotic of capers. Mainframe is representative of a police technical analyst.
- Wayne R. "CheckPoint" Sneeden III (voiced by Ron Rubin) is a military officer who grew up in Alabama, he works for the United States Army and joins forces with COPS. He is fearful, nervous, anxious, but stays on the case with the team anyway to help get the job done. He appears in "The Case of Mukluk's Luck", "The Case of the Iron C.O.P.S and Wooden Crooks", and "The Case of the Red Hot Hoodlum" where he had major roles in those episodes. CheckPoint's toy File Card says his "father was a member of a top-secret military team in the '80s and '90s", referencing G.I. Joe character Beach Head (AKA Wayne R. Sneeden). He is representative of a U.S. Army military police officer.
- Hy "Taser" Watts (voiced by Len Carlson) is a police officer who worked with the Seattle Police Department and is known for tasering crooks who try to resist arrest. He appeared in a few episodes, but his major role was in "The Big Boss's Big Switch".
- Robert E. "A.P.E.S." Waldo is a police officer who worked with the Boston Police Department, he has a pair of long grappling hand devices similar to LongArm's powercuffs. A.P.E.S. is short for Automated Police Enforcement System. He appeared in "The Case of the High Iron Hoods".
- Roger "Airwave" Wilco is a police officer who worked with the Los Angeles Police Department and is a good communications expert.
- Francis "Inferno" Devlin is a firefighter who worked with the San Francisco Fire Department, he appeared in a few episodes including "The Case of the Bad Luck Burglar".
- Dudley "Powderkeg" Defuze is a police officer who worked with the Washington D.C. Police Department that is known for disarming and defusing bombs and other types of explosives, he helped Squeeky Kleen neutralize the Midas Glove that Squeeky wore in "The Case of the Midas Touch".
- Max "Nightstick" Mulukai is a police officer who worked with the Honolulu Police Department and is an expert in martial arts, he appeared in a few episodes including "The Case of the Missing Memory".
- Sherman A. "Heavyweight" Patton is a military officer who worked at Fort Leavenworth, he joined up with COPS where he serves as their A.T.A.C. (short for Armored Tactical Attack Craft) driver.

=== Villains ===
==== C.R.O.O.K.S. ====
C.R.O.O.K.S. is an organized crime group that commits crimes in Empire City. Known members include:

- Brandon "Big Boss" Babel (voiced by Len Carlson imitating Edward G. Robinson) is a crime boss and the primary antagonist of the series who plans to rule Empire City with a literal iron fist. Brandon is also a businessman while in public. He is portrayed as being obese, yet is able to walk normally. Unlike the members of his organized crime, Big Boss is never apprehended and ends up getting away after COPS thwarts his criminal activities.
  - Scratch is Big Boss' pet weasel with metal paws and cybernetic armor. He is always seen in the company of Big Boss.
- Berserko / Barney L. Fatheringhouse (voiced by Paul De La Rosa) is an impulsive, dim-witted thug who is the proud nephew of Big Boss. He is called "Berserko" because his methods are often seen as crazy or bizarre. Berserko once robbed a party supply store wearing a mask he just bought from the same store.
- Rock Krusher / Edmund Scarry (voiced by Brent Titcomb) is a super-strong thug who works for Big Boss and often wears striped-clothes reminiscent of an old prisoner's uniform. He often uses a heavy-duty jackhammer in order to get into bank vaults. At one point, Rock Krusher was romantically involved with fellow super-strong operative Ms. Demeanor.
- Ms. Demeanor / Stephanie Demeanor (voiced by Paulina Gillis) is a middle-aged, super-strong woman with the appearance of a normal businesswoman who works for Big Boss. Ms. Demeanor has the muscular physique of a champion bodybuilder and often gets upset when people accuse her of not being feminine.
- Turbo Tu-Tone / Ted Stavely (voiced by Dan Hennessey) is a minion of Big Boss who serves as his getaway driver. He is a skilled mechanic and pilot as well. Turbo Tu-Tone was the one responsible for causing the car wreck that resulted in Baldwin P. Vess gaining a cybernetic torso.
- Doctor Badvibes / Percival "Percy" Cranial (voiced by Ron Rubin) is a brilliant, though completely deranged mad scientist. Ever since he was fired from Comtrex Technologies Incorporated for stealing top secret electronics, he works for Big Boss devising inventions for his plans and robotic minions for Big Boss's gang. Doctor Badvibes has a glass dome on top of his head which shows his abnormally large brain and is known to create literal brainstorms by charging electricity through his brainwaves to form a cloud that can produce rain, thunder, and lightning.
  - Buzzbomb (voiced by Ron Rubin): A robot created by Doctor Badvibes for companionship that works for Big Boss, he has a buzzsaw on one arm and a clamper on the other. Buzzbomb also seems to have a personality that counters and/or complements Doctor Badvibes in a lot of ways.
  - WALDO is a small robot created by Doctor Badvibes that once impersonated Bulletproof to take over and sabotage C.O.P.S.
  - Shifty is a shape-shifting android created by Doctor Badvibes.
  - Nightmare the Android is an android by Doctor Badvibes.
- Nightshade / Rafaella Diamond (voiced by Jane Schoettle) was born into a rich family. She ended up disowned by her parents when she turned to crime stealing expensive and exotic jewellery for the thrill of it, not out of financial needs. Nightshade now works for Big Boss and is secretly in love with Mace who reforms her after Big Boss kidnapped her younger sister to force Nightshade to pull off a major heist.
- Buttons McBoomBoom / Constantine Saunders (voiced by Nick Nichols) is a minion of Big Boss. He is seen wearing a red suit and fedora and carries around a violin case that hides his favorite playtoy, which is a deadly modified Thompson submachine gun with a scope attachment that he uses to blast away at any target at will. In addition, Buttons McBoomBoom hides underneath his suit a cybernetic torso that conceals twin machine guns with which he blasts away after he unbuttons his shirt to reveal them in the heat of battle against either the COPS or a swarm of bugs.
- Squeeky Kleen / Dirk McHugh (voiced by Marvin Goldhar) is a bald and lanky criminal who serves as Big Boss' lackey. He drives Big Boss' limo as his chauffeur, cleans his clothes, cleans his office, and once tried to arrange a surprise birthday party for Big Boss which Berserko ruined by trying to steal a bridge.
- Koo-Koo is a time bomb expert that works for Big Boss.
- Hyena is a criminal mastermind that uses prank-related gimmicks in his crime. He held a criminal contest against Big Boss to determine who will stay in Empire City and who will leave. A challenge like that caused Big Boss to orchestrate Highway's kidnapping in order to get Bulletproof and Barricade to help him. During the criminal games, COPS managed to turn the tables against Hyena and his goons and arrest them. Hyena and his henchmen later inexplicably popped up as minions of Big Boss indicating that the two of them have settled their differences and formed an alliance.
  - Bullit is a henchman of Hyena. He wears rocket boots and a bullet-shaped helmet strong enough to break safes.
  - Louie the Plumber (voiced by Ron Rubin) is a plumber-themed criminal who is a henchman of Hyena. He has a mechanical left arm containing a grappling hook.

==== Minor criminals ====
Other villains in this show were either unaffiliated with Big Boss' gang or shown working with them only once. They include:

- The Bugman is a short criminal who uses an insect-controlling device that enables him to control insects to commit his crimes after people stopped showing up to his flea circus. He joined up with Big Boss' gang, but left when he did not get a high pay. This causes Nightshade and Buttons McBoomBoom to steal Bugman's bugs and the insect-controlling device and use them in their crimes. When Mainframe and Bowser and Blitz found him after tailing Gaylord, they find out that Bugman only turned to crime because people stopped coming to see his Flea Circus meaning that he was simply desperate. They help him into regaining his insect-controlling device. Though Buttons and Nightshade are defeated, Bugman is also arrested for trying to steal jewels that the pair stole using Bugman's bugs. He was last seen restarting his flea circus in prison where his entertaining of the guards is a diversion for Gaylord who secretly makes for the keys. In "The Case of the Lesser of Two Weevils", Bugman escapes from prison when Gaylord gets captured by his rival the Boll Weevil. When Boll Weevil was defeated, Bugman and Gaylord went back to show business.
  - Gaylord is a weevil who is the Bugman's favorite insect. He leads Bugman's insects in Bugman's crime spree.
- Joseph "Jim" Vargas is a corrupt head of the city council who was bribed by Big Boss to make the Instant Justice Machines. When the Instant Justice Machines caught Mace and Barricade trespassing in Vetrocon, he called Big Boss about what to do. When COPS storms Vetrocon, Vargas unleashes the Instant Justice Machines on them. When Mace and Barricade catch up to Vargas, he threatens to blow up the factory with him alongside it. He then demands immunity and an offer to name names of anyone involved. Barricade is able to convince Vargas that suicide would be a waste. Vargas then realizes he doesn't want to kill himself and the people in the factory, so he gives himself up and is sentenced to prison.
  - The Instant Justice Machines are a bunch of robots with computer screen heads built by Vargas in order to put COPS out of business. They act not only as police officers, but also as judges and jailers leaving the culprit trapped until a police car comes by. Some of the crimes they busted involved a man illegally parking on a spot that is only allowed on Tuesdays, a woman jaywalking, a man littering when his hat fell off in the wind while carrying groceries, and two teens speeding on their skateboards. When it came to Highway busting Ms. Demeanor, an Instant Justice Machine found her innocent of all charges. The Instant Justice Machines ended up fighting COPS when they stormed Vetrocon. Barricade even talked the Instant Justice Machine guarding him and Mac into releasing them. When Mace and Barricade end up cornering Vargas, the other Instant Justice Machines stopped their attacks. Following Vargas' arrest, most of the Instant Justice Machines were deactivated except for the one that Barricade talked into freeing him and Mace. The Instant Justice Machine in COPS' possession reappeared in "The Case of the Big Boss' Master Plan" two-part episode and "The Case of the Iron C.O.P.S. and Wooden Crooks".
- Johnny Yuma is the former partner of Sundown who became an outlaw. He was put away by Sundown for trying to steal the money they recovered from a robbery and various train robberies. He eventually escapes from the Texas State Prison to take revenge on Sundown. When Turbo Tu-Tone sees him, he calls up Big Boss who instructs him to follow Johnny and know his every move. Sundown hears of Johnny's prison break and manages to confront him when he breaks into the cowboy museum to regain his lasso, from the Outlaws Hall of Fame. Johnny manages to lasso Sundown to a robotic bull. As Johnny heads out to rob the Silver Bullet Express, Turbo Tu-Tone trails him and turns on the robotic bull to stall Sundown. Upon being tipped off by Turbo Tu-Tone, Big Boss sends Berserko, Rock Krusher, and Buttons McBoomBoom to recruit Johnny Yuma. When the three rendezvous with Turbo Tu-Tone to recruit Johnny Yuma into Big Boss' gang, Johnny Yuma tells them that he works alone and defeats them. Johnny then leaves to go rob the Silver Bullet Express prompting Berserko to lead the Turbo Tu-Tone, Rock Krusher, and Buttons McBoomBoom into robbing it first. Sundown manages to catch up to Johnny Yuma on the Silver Bullet Express and ends up fighting him until Big Boss' minions crash the fight. After Berserko, Turbo Tu-Tone, Rock Krusher, and Buttons McBoomBoom were defeated, Johnny Yuma agrees to return to jail to finish his sentence which led to an early release due to good behavior. He now works as a deputy in a small Texas town.
- Small Guy is a dwarf criminal who ran his own gang.
- Jenny Wringer is a female con artist.
- Big Momma is an old lady who is Big Boss's mother and Berserko's grandmother. She is blind to the fact that her son is not as skinny as she thought him to have been. When she once visited Empire City to visit her son, Big Boss had to cover up his criminal side by stating that he is a philanthropist and even started an orphanage with his henchmen posing as orphans. Due to his mother being around, he was not able to successfully steal the money and had to donate it to charity. In "The Case of the Lost Boss", she secretly moves to Kansas and orchestrates her son's kidnapping before he can plan a heist on Stargy Island's diamond mines. Big Momma's kidnapping of Big Boss caused his henchman to blame the COPS for Big Boss' disappearance causing them to capture Barricade. Berserko tails the COPS when they run into Big Momma and informs Doctor Badvibes that Big Boss is at Big Momma's apartment. The C.R.O.O.K.S managed to swipe Big Boss from Big Momma's apartment so that they can get on with their plans to take over Stargy Island. COPS thwarted Big Boss' plans causing him to escape with Big Momma.
- Mukluk is a tricky Canadian thief.
- Boll Weevil is an insect-themed villain. He once captured Gaylord causing Bugman to escape from prison to get him back.
- Addictem is a drug dealer who was selling Crystal Twists that were causing people to become addicted to them. He tried to join Big Boss' gang only to be denied since Big Boss does not indulge in drug dealing. Because of Addictem spreading his Crystal Twist drugs across Empire City and Berserko falling into a Crystal Twist crate trying to steal a cache of Mayan Gold, Big Boss and his gang had to team up with COPS to stop Addictem's drug ring. When Addictem was chased into the hospital and grabbed by Berserko, Addictem surrendered to COPS to evade getting beaten up by Berserko. Addictem was sentenced to life in prison and those who were affected by the Crystal Twists are recovering from them. Big Boss and his gang went right back to committing their intended crime after his arrest.

=== Supporting characters ===
- Mayor Davis is the mayor of Empire City.
- Commissioner Highwater is the female police commissioner of Empire City.
- Whitney Morgan (voiced by Jeri Craden) is ECTV top reporter who is referred to as the prettiest reporter in Empire City who Hardtop has a crush on.
  - Beamer is Whitney Morgan's camera robot.
- Brian O'Malley is LongArm's son.

=== Minor characters ===
- Judge Davis is a judge who is Mayor Davis' twin brother.
- Linda O'Malley is LongArm's wife.
- Mickey O'Malley is LongArm's dad, Brian's grandfather, and special advisor to C.O.P.S.
- The President of the United States is an unnamed African-American female.
- Suds Sparko is a criminal put away by Mickey O'Malley in the 1990s who later became Rock Krusher's cellmate. Before he was arrested, he was able to hide his loot in a laundromat.
- Brannigan is Mayor Davis' personal assistant who is revealed to be a spy for Big Boss.
- Prince Baddin is a bratty spoiled foreign prince who was kidnapped for ransom by Berserko and Rock Krusher. They brought him to "Uncle Fatty Big Boss" and try to hold him for ransom only for the prince to manipulate the crooks into catering to his every whim, prompting the Boss to send him back to the COPS. Later the Prince learned his lesson when he tried to get on a broken down Ferris wheel to ride it only to find himself trapped on the Ferris wheel with the seats coming loose. After being rescued by LongArm, Baddin decides to change his ways and become a good prince rather than a spoiled bad prince leading the king to change his name to from Baddin to Goodin.
- Kathleen Diamond is Nightshade's little sister.
- Greasy is a cellmate of Rock Krusher's at Greystone Prison.
- Samantha is a tomboy who helps the COPS out during an investigation Doctor Badvibes' circus.
- Captain Crimefighter / Cindy Johnson is a teenage girl who dreams of being a superhero. She assisted the C.O.P.S. in one of their cases.
- Inspector Yukon is a police inspector attached to the RCMP. First appearing in "The Case of the Iceberg Pirates", Yukon's mission was to transport an aid package from the Canadian government to replenish Empire City's depleted water reserves.
- Agent Belson is an Executive Protection Unit agent (this show's version of the Secret Service), whose overconfidence is matched only by his ineptitude.

== Episodes ==
No.	Title	Directed by	Written by	Original release date	Prod. code
1	"The Case of the Stuck-Up Blimp"	Kevin Altieri	Carl Macek	September 19, 1988	160001
Bulletproof and Hardtop attend a charity dinner on the Mountback, the most state of the art blimp in Empire City. The Crooks however are there to make a robbery. Hardtop must get over his fear of heights to help Bulletproof and the COPS team stop the crooks from looting the blimp.
2	"The Case of the Crime Circus"	Kevin Altieri	Duane Capizzi	September 20, 1988	160002
The circus has come to town, but it is no ordinary circus, but rather a mechanical circus run by Dr. BadVibes as a cover-up for his plan to heist the Gold Depository by the orders of Big Boss. He had not counted on a tomboy named Samantha to help LongArm and Hardtop permanently bring the curtain down on BadVibes' Big Top Caper, though.
3	"The Case of the Baffling Bugman"	Kevin Altieri	Carl Macek	September 21, 1988	160003
A mysterious Bugman with his huge swarm of trained bugs led by Gaylord, the Bugman's prize bug, is pulling robberies at various jewelry stores and wants to join Big Boss' crooked gang, but a lousy payment from Big Boss forced the Bugman to resign, only to have his precious swarm "bugnapped" by Nightshade and Buttons McBoomBoom, who use them to pull their own jewel heists. The Bugman seeks aid from Mainframe and Bowser and Blitz, who helped him get his bugs back and arrest the Bugman, too.
4	"The Case of Berserko's Big Surprise"	Kevin Altieri	Carl Macek, Duane Capizzi	September 22, 1988	160004
It is Big Boss' birthday and Berserko plans on giving his uncle the Cornucopia Bridge for his birthday. Mirage, on the other hand, has a much different plan – save the bridge and arrest Berserko and his henchmen in the process.
5	"The Case of the Bogus Justice Machines"	Kevin Altieri	Carl Macek, Michael Charles Hill	September 23, 1988	160005
The COPS are in danger of being replaced by a new brand of crime fighting robots known as The Instant Justice Machines, which did poorly in handling law enforcement thanks to a corrupt Head Councilman named Vargas who is bribed by Big Boss to continue to make the robots and put C.O.P.S. out of business for good.
6	"The Case of the Prison Break-In"	Kevin Altieri	Steve Roberts, Duane Capizzi	September 26, 1988	160006
Rock Krusher has taken over Graystone Prison and plans on using a large device known as The Neutron Pulverizer to disintegrate City Hall unless his demands are met by 6:00 p.m. Going undercover as a prison inmate named "Maddog", Bowser is able to radio the COPS team on Krusher's plan just before Krusher cuts off all communications to the outside. The only way for the COPS team to stop Krusher's plan is to break into the prison the same way inmates normally break out.
7	"The Case of the Pardner in Crime"	Kevin Altieri	Ardwight Chamberlain, Reed Shelly	September 27, 1988	160007
Johnny Yuma, Sundown's ex-partner and master train robber, escapes from prison for a revenge showdown with Sundown for putting him in prison in the first place. When he hears about what happened, Sundown goes off to face Yuma to convince him to turn himself back to the side of the law.
8	"The Case of C.O.P.S. File #1, Part 1"	Kevin Altieri	Carl Macek, David Wise	September 28, 1988	160008
This file has been classified until now. In the Empire City, a crime boss Brandon "Big Boss" Babel and his crooked henchmen are holding the entire city in their grip of terror. Federal Agent Baldwin P. Vess (A.K.A. Bulletproof) is sent to take him and his crooks into custody, but he gets seriously injured and has to be taken to the hospital. He is given a new lease on life with a cybernetic torso and the formation of a team of the most highly trained law enforcers in the entire country known as the Central Organization of Police Specialists (COPS).
9	"The Case of C.O.P.S. File #1, Part 2"	Kevin Altieri	Carl Macek, David Wise	September 29, 1988	160009
The Ultimate Crime Machine, a huge air vessel shaped like a flying saucer, looms over Empire City. Piloted by Turbo Tu-Tone, Buzzbomb, and Rock Krusher, this machine hovers over the Empire City Mint, rips it off of its foundation with powerful cables and carries it up into the sky with Bulletproof inside of it. It is up to the COPS team to stop the large vessel and foil the first of many criminal schemes rigged up by Big Boss.
10	"The Case of the Blur Bandits"	Kevin Altieri	Alex Pegel	September 30, 1988	160010
Dr. BadVibes invents a special suit that allows the crooks to go very fast. Highway tries to stop them, but he fails. Ashamed, Highway turns in his badge. Later on, Highway gets kidnapped and held captive by Turbo Tu-Tone in his garage. Shortly afterward, he escapes to bag Turbo, gets his badge back, and uses Turbo's speed suit to arrest the other crooks in record time.
11	"The Case of the Bulletproof Waldo"	Kevin Altieri	Richard Mueller	October 3, 1988	160011
Dr. BadVibes creates a robotic clone version of Bulletproof controlled by a small robot named Waldo to replace the real Bulletproof as leader of COPS. Only Blitz knows the real Bulletproof when he sees one.
12	"The Case of the Blitz Attack"	Kevin Altieri	Ted Pedersen	October 4, 1988	160012
In direct retaliation for thwarting a criminal heist put on by Berserko and Rock Krusher, Big Boss orders Dr. BadVibes to do whatever it takes to tame Blitz, who helped Bowser in thwarting the heist, and get rid of him. The mad scientist goes out and creates a dog whistle-like device which he uses to control Blitz, forcing him to ruin the efforts of the COPS team to perform their duties. Meanwhile, Berserko forces Dr. Adams, the one who saved Blitz's life years ago, to lie to Bulletproof and Bowser, telling them that Blitz must be dismantled because of a glitch found inside his body. Mainframe and Bowser, knowing for a fact that there is nothing wrong with Blitz, and that Blitz cannot be controlled the way Dr. BadVibes controls his own robots, decide to take action.
13	"The Case of the Baby Badguy"	Richard T. Morrison	Perry Martin	October 5, 1988	160013
A small midget-size man known as Small Guy and his two henchmen pose as orphaned babies to get into the newly opened Empire City Orphanage to take over the place and use it as their hideout. They take hostage Mrs. Lopside, the caretaker of the orphanage, and Whitney Morgan, who came to interview her about her project of helping homeless orphans find loving homes. The COPS team must storm the orphanage to rescue the hostages and discipline those three naughty "babies".
14	"The Case of the Thieving Robots"	Kevin Altieri	Reed Shelly, Somtow Sucharitkul	October 6, 1988	160014
Dr. BadVibes decides to toy around with the idea of creating toy size robots and program them to steal items from the homes of the children who own them. Brian O'Malley, the son of LongArm, gets one of the robots for his birthday. Named "Rocky", this robot ends up stealing a family heirloom, a green leprechaun statue passed down from LongArm's great-grandfather, and runs off with it. Brian follows the robot to where BadVibes set up his hideout at an old abandoned toy factory right near the sewers. There, he gets captured and held captive by BadVibes, who winds up arguing with Buzzbomb over the share of the stolen loot, hurting his feelings in the process. Brian must talk Buzzbomb into releasing and helping him, Sundown, and his father put a stop to BadVibes and his army of thieving robots.
15	"The Case of the Highway Robbery"	Kevin Altieri	Reed Shelly	October 7, 1988	160015
Mayor Davis is enraged when his limousine gets stolen by Nightshade and Squeeky Kleen who are planning on converting it into Big Boss' own personal limousine lookalike along with all of the other cars they stole. He demands Highway and Hardtop to get his limousine back. Meanwhile, Highway must go out and get his Bluestreak motorcycle back that was stolen from Nightshade before it shares the same fate as the other vehicles she stole.
16	"The Case of the Crime Convention"	Richard T. Morrison	Mark Edens	October 10, 1988	160016
Big Boss hosts a special Crooks Convention in Empire City where he plans to award the Criminal of the Year Award to one lucky crook. Buttons McBoomBoom and Berserko both duke it out to see who will have that title.
17	"The Case of the Crook with a Thousand Faces"	Kevin Altieri	Michael A. Medlock, Kerry M. Scudder	October 11, 1988	160017
Dr. Badvibes creates a shape-shifting android named Shifty, who can change into anything and anyone at will. He uses his shape changing abilities to kidnap Mirage and sneak inside the Empire Mint to steal a $1 print. Bulletproof, Highway, Bowzer, and Blitz must rescue Mirage, get back the print, and put an end to Shifty's crooked shape-shifting career.
18	"The Case of the Super Shake Down"	Kevin Altieri	Mark Edens	October 12, 1988	160018
Dr. BadVibes creates an earthquake device known as the Ground Shaker for Big Boss who plans to use it to level the city to the ground unless his demands for the city are met. It is up to the COPS team to stabilized the city and shakedown Big Boss' crooked caper before it is too late.
19	"The Case of the Criminal Mall"	Kevin Altieri	Steve Hayes, Carl Macek	October 13, 1988	160019
Mainframe, Bowser, and Blitz pay a visit to the newly opened shopping mall to test out the Mall's new theft-proof security system created by Mr. Keen, the head of mall security and foil Dr. BadVibes' plans to steal the brain behind the system.
20	"The Case of the Big Bad Boxoids"	Kevin Altieri	Pamela Hickey, Dennys McCoy	October 14, 1988	160020
Three of the best Boxoids (robot boxing suits) has been stolen by Big Boss who plans on using them to steal the mazer melter from a construction site and use it to melt down the Empire City Power plant, causing a major blackout over the entire city unless Mayor Davis can cough up twenty million dollars in one hour. It is up to the COPS team to K.O. Big Boss' plans before it's too late.
21	"The Case of the Half Pint Hero"	Kevin Altieri	Ardwight Chamberlain, Carl Macek	October 17, 1988	160021
In this caper, COPS are aided by a very unusual ally: Cindy Johnson as Captain Crimefighter, a little girl in a superhero costume who helps the team capture Rock Krusher, Turbo Tu-Tone, and Ms. Demeanor and, along the way, uncover two bags of stolen cash hidden at a construction site taken from a robbed bank by Krusher and Turbo.
22	"The Case of the Brilliant Berserko"	Richard T. Morrison	Dennis O'Flaherty	October 18, 1988	160022
Berserko steals a special headband that makes him very unusually intelligent when he puts it on his head. In this new form, Berserko makes plans to intelligently trap the COPS team at his amusement park hideaway while inciting Dr. BadVibes' jealousy of his new-found brilliance.
23	"The Case of the Big Frame Up"	Kevin Altieri	David Wise	October 19, 1988	160023
Mickey O'Malley, LongArm's father, gets arrested for a crime he did not commit. He is falsely accused of stealing priceless furs from a warehouse and is sent to prison for it. It is up to both his son and his grandson Brian to help clear his name and send the real crooks responsible for the fur heist to the slammer.
24	"The Case of the Sinister Spa"	Kevin Altieri	David Bennet Carren, J. Larry Carroll	October 20, 1988	160024
A brand new Skyline Spa has just been opened and is operated by Ms. Demeanor who uses mesmerizing fumes to put Mayor Davis under a trance and force him to hand over all authority to Berserko who temporary becomes Deputy Mayor of Empire city and force the COPS team to do community service as garbage collectors while Mainframe and Mirage gets captured and forced to do laundry for the Crooks. The two lady COPS escaped to help their teammates clean up the streets of Crooks and rescue Mayor Davis from the fuming trance.
25	"The Case of the Cool Caveman"	Kevin Altieri	David Bennet Carren, J. Larry Carroll	October 21, 1988	8904
Brian befriends a prehistoric caveman who was frozen in ice since the Ice Age. This sparks an interest from Big Boss since the caveman bears a striking resemblance to Berserko, leading them to switch roles so that they can have Berserko go in to pull off a heist at the Empire City's museum.
26	"The Case of the Wayward Whiz Kid"	Kevin Altieri	Robert Schooley, Mark McCorkle	October 24, 1988	160026
Willy Bright, a boy genius who owns a mainframe computer system named "Chip", accidentally took control of Buzzbomb when he tries to steal a priceless diamond from the school's art museum. Dr. Badvibes, intrigued by Willy's computer savyness, attempts to make friends with the Willy and trick him into helping him hack the COPS security system and force it to trapped the COPS team inside their headquarters while Buzzbomb and Turbo Tu-Tone goes to steal the priceless gem. Willy, realizing what Badvibes and Big Boss is doing, uses his computer skills to escape from the crooks and help the COPS team regain control of the precinct's security system and short circuit Big Boss and Badvibes' techo scheme.
27	"The Case of the Stashed Cash"	Richard T. Morrison	Mark McCorkle, Robert Schooley	October 25, 1988	160027
35 years ago, Mickey O'Malley nabbed one of Empire City's most wanted crooks by the name of Suds Sparko, who secretly hid five million dollars in cold hard cash in a secret location. The only vital clue to its whereabouts is a map carved on a bar of soap. Big Boss sends Rock Krusher and Buttons McBoomBoom to steal the soap, but a mishap completely dissolved the whole map, leaving the two crooks to kidnap Mickey and Brian and take them to where Krusher knows exactly where the loot is stashed at – the West Side Laundry, where Mickey will have to figure out where at the place the loot is stashed – and help LongArm and Barricade send the criminals to the cleaners.
28	"The Case of the Big Boss' Master Plan, Part 1"	Kevin Altieri	Carl Macek	October 26, 1988	160028
The President of the United States (who is an African American woman) is traveling to Empire City to attend a dedication ceremony of the S.S. Empire, a brand new state-of-the-art aircraft carrier built as part of the country's defense. She is traveling on board the presidential train with Agent Belson and many other FBI agents who are there on the train to provide security for her. Bulletproof, Hardtop, and LongArm are also there for additional security. This does not stop Berserko, Buttons McBoomBoom, and Ms. Demeanor from breaking into the train, kidnapping the President, and took her away by the orders of Big Boss who then agree to release her in exchange for the aircraft carrier he wants to have for his own. The COPS team and Mayor Davis agrees only for Big Boss to double cross them by making them receive an android version of the President while he and his crooks went out to take procession of the aircraft carrier, still holding the real Madame President captive.
29	"The Case of the Big Boss' Master Plan, Part 2"	Kevin Altieri	Carl Macek	October 27, 1988	160029
Empire City is plunged into a state of crisis when Big Boss tells everyone that Empire City is all his and he has got the president all lock up tight in a cage on board the S.S. Empire he and his crooks went forth and took over. The citizens are forced to bow to Big Boss' demands and leave the city forever if they ever want to see the President again. As for COPS, Big Boss wants them to stay in the city and be locked away in prison so he can get back at them for all the times they imprisoned the crooks. They are not there for long. With the help of Belson and his men, the COPS team escape and then go out to rescue the President, bring the city back to normal, and be awarded the Medal of Honor by Madam President for their bravery.
30	"The Case of the Criminal Games"	Richard T. Morrison	Rob Thompson, Jaron Summers	October 28, 1988	160030
Three new crooks, Hyena, Bullit and Louie the Plumber, arrive at Empire City and challenge Big Boss to "The Criminal Games" right after they nab a case full of loot that Berserko and Turbo have stolen from a bank. In order for Big Boss to win the game, he kidnaps Highway and forces Bulletproof and Barricade to help him win the criminal games or else he will never see his teammate again.
31	"The Case of the Iceberg Pirates"	Kevin Altieri	Richard Cooper, Jim McDermott	October 31, 1988	160031
A huge heatwave hits Empire City and the water supply for the city is nearly depleted. Inspector Yukon of the Royal Canadian Mounted Police offers a huge iceberg to help replenish the city's reservoir. Big Boss decides to steal the iceberg and hold it for ransom. The COPS team must put the freeze on Big Boss' cold caper and deliver the iceberg to Empire City. Along the way, Sundown has to learn how to swim.
32	"The Case of the Giveaway Gold"	Kevin Altieri	Jim McDermott, Richard Cooper	November 1, 1988	160032
Dr. BadVibes has decided to be "generous" and shower down a stockpile of gold coins to the people of Empire City, but the gold coins are actually explosives which Big Boss plans on using to blast open the safes where the fake gold will be stored in to get at the real loot stored inside.
33	"The Case of the Big Little Green Men"	Richard T. Morrison	Reed Shelly	November 2, 1988	160033
The COPS team experience an out-of-this-world caper when a rare gem, which was brought to Earth from Mars, gets stolen by "Martians" who are in fact Big Boss' crooks in disguise. They also kidnapped Commissioner Highwater and plunged the city into a grip of terror and panic. Mainframe had to race against time to rescue the Commissioner, uncover the gem, and send it back into outer space before the Martian gem destablizes due to its exposure to the Earth's atmosphere and explode, taking all of Empire City with it.
34	"The Case of the Crook with a Conscience"	Kevin Altieri	S.M. Molitor	November 3, 1988	160034
Ms. Demeanor is ordered by Judge Davis, Mayor Davis' twin brother, to wear a conscience band on her head that tells her whether her actions are either right or wrong. This however never worked out because Ms. Demeanor is overdoing it with the band and is causing more trouble than she does without it.
35	"The Case of Mace's Romance"	Kevin Altieri	Bob Forward	November 4, 1988	160035
Big Boss orders Nightshade to steal charity money raised for the homeless at a ballroom party event for a lousy 10% cut, but Nightshade refuses. Big Boss forces her to do it by having Buttons McBoomBoom kidnap her own younger sister Kathleen and frame Nightshade for it. Nightshade gets Mace to help her rescue her sister and thwart Big Boss' charity heist. That is when romance between Cop and Crook (Mace and Nightshade) begins to ignite and flare up starting with a special "thank you" kiss Nightshade blows to Mace from the precinct window.
36	"The Case of the Boy Nobody Wanted"	Kevin Altieri	Ted Pedersen	November 7, 1988	160036
A deaf boy is afraid to tell the COPS team about a crime he witnessed being committed by Turbo Tu-Tone and Rock Krusher. Once he is brave enough to tell what he saw, the boy, through lip-reading, helps the team thwart another caper by switching a floppy disk containing some vital information Big Boss wants to get his hands on with a fake disk containing a computer virus that causes the computer system in the penthouse to go haywire.
37	"The Case of the Bogus Bride"	Richard T. Morrison	Mark Edens	November 8, 1988	160037
Crooked wedding bells are ringing as Jenny Wringer, a con artist and safe cracker, plans to marry Berserko as part of a plot to run off with a horde of stolen gold bars Big Boss has stashed away at a hotel. The COPS team will have to call off the wedding before Jamie heads to the altar with Berserko and out the door with the stolen horde.
38	"The Case of the Visiting Mother"	Richard T. Morrison	W. Blake Herron	November 9, 1988	160038
Big Momma pays her son Big Boss a visit in Empire City to accompany him to an auction brought on by Commissioner Highwaters to raise money for the global police charity fund Big Boss wants his crooks to steal, but the crime is doomed to failure thanks to Big Boss having to struggle to be good and generous by hiding his true colors from her such as pretending to run an orphanage at an abandoned warehouse with his crooks posing as "orphans". Big Boss, for the sake of Big Momma, partake in the auction and won every item he wants except for one item and then later on help the COPS team thwart the robbery attempt on the funds at the airport.
39	"The Case of the Ghost Crooks"	Kevin Altieri	Stef Donev, Mary Kaiser Donev	November 10, 1988	160039
Dr. Badvibes creates man-controlled powered suits that come to life and rob computer micro chips from a computer laboratory so that Big Boss can sell them for millions while making the security guard believe that he is seeing ghosts. Meanwhile, Bowser gets superstitious on account of today being Friday the 13th.
40	"The Case of the Lying Lie Detector"	Kevin Altieri	Paul Davids	November 11, 1988	160040
Blitz helps the COPS team arrest Nightshade and Turbo Tu-Tone for stealing Mayor Davis' briefcase which contain the blueprint of city hall. This leads the Big Boss to plot his revenge by sending Dr. Badvibes to kidnap Bowser and Blitz so that he can frame them for the theft by reversing Blitz's lie detector chip: one bark for a lie and twice for the truth. Bowser has to clear his, Blitz, and the COPS' name while heading out to rescue Mayor Davis from being held hostage from the crooks.
41	"The Case of the Disappearing Dough"	Kevin Altieri	Michael Edens, Mark Edens	November 14, 1988	160041
Big Boss hatches a plot to destroy all the currency in Empire City and replace them with his own counterfeit "Boss Bucks".
42	"The Case of MukLuk's Luck"	Richard T. Morrison	Stef Donev	November 15, 1988	160042
Checkpoint teams up with Inspector Yukon to capture a tricky Canadian thief named Mukluk who has arrived in Empire City. He even steals the BlackJack Trophy Big Boss won in "The Case of the Crime Convention" and prompts the Boss to send Bullit and Rock Krusher to head to Mukluk's Arctic hideout and reclaim the trophy, only for all their luck to run out and for the trophy to land at the paws of a polar bear.
43	"The Case of the Baby Badguy's Return"	Richard T. Morrison	Perry Martin	November 16, 1988	160043
Small Guy and his men are back. This time, they pose as three grandsons of an old lady to infiltrate the mansion and get their greedy little hands on the old lady's fortune.
44	"The Case of the Rock and Roll Robbers"	Richard T. Morrison	[no writer credited]	November 17, 1988	160044
Dr. BadVibes creates musical instruments that hypnotize concert goers so that his pals can rob them of their valuables and forms a rock band he calls the Bad News featuring Berserko and Rock Krusher as part of their plan to take over the ECTV's Doctor Rock show and stage a concert to hypnotize all citizens into giving up their valuables. Mirage and Hardtop are sent to go undercover as talent scout agents to put an end to the Bad News' musical career and bring one big sour note to this caper.
45	"The Case of the Boy Who Cried Sea Monster"	Kevin Altieri	Martha Moran	November 18, 1988	160045
After a mechanical sea monster ate his grandfather's watch, LongArm's son Brian goes to tell him and Hardtop about what he saw. When they don't believed him, Brian sets out to prove what he saw and ends up being a prisoner of Rock Krusher and Dr. Badvibes, who created the sea monster to commit a series of robberies along the harbor.
46	"The Case of the Runaway Buzzbomb"	Kevin Altieri	Reed Shelly	November 21, 1988	160046
After overhearing Big Boss and Dr. Badvibes' plans to scrap him after a heist, Buzzbomb decides to run away with the stolen rocket fuel which Big Boss plans to sell it for millions. Buzzbomb joins Amanda (Highway's niece) who also ran away from home, leading the COPS team to go out and search for Amanda. At the same time, Dr. Badvibes and Rock Krusher go out to search for Buzzbomb so they can get back the rocket fuel.
47	"The Case of the Missing Masterpiece"	Kevin Altieri	Carole B. Mendelsohn	November 22, 1988	160047
The Famous painting of the Mona Lisa gets stolen by Big Boss for his own stolen art collection, but Nightshade beats him to it and tries to seduce Rock Krusher into allowing her to keep the painting. The crooks steal it back and plan to cut the painting up in shreds and sell the pieces for 3 million dollars each, but not if the COPS can help it.
48	"The Case of the Lesser of Two Weevils"	Kevin Altieri	Carl Macek	November 23, 1988	160048
The Bugman escapes from prison when his prized weevil Gaylord gets brainwashed and bugnapped by his arch nemesis Boll Weevil. He then uses a stolen growth formula to turn Gaylord and another bug into giants and then teams up with Big Boss to rob a large gold scarab being displayed in the Empire City Museum. Elsewhere, Mace and Bowser go out searching for the Bugman the moment they found out about his escape.
49	"The Case of Big Boss' Bye Bye"	Kevin Altieri	Bob Forward	November 24, 1988	160049
Sometimes, Big Boss likes to take advantage of the city's problems and use it to his own advantage. Empire City is having many financial troubles and Mayor Davis has declared that all unnecessary employment in Empire City must be eliminated. Bulletproof has to assure the COPS team that they are not one of those unnecessary employment areas, but Big Boss makes COPS to be one of them by faking retirement and takes off to a tropical island hideaway, anticipating the COPS team to receive the pink slip. Afterwards, Big Boss returns to pull a heist on the Empire Central Railroad train that is coming to Empire City to deliver relief funds to the city, which is thwarted by Bulletproof, Highway, Mainframe, and Mace, who all get their jobs back afterwards.
50	"The Case of the Iron C.O.P.S. and Wooden Crooks"	Kevin Altieri	Ted Pedersen	November 25, 1988	160050
A few months after the events of "The Case of the Bogus Justice Machines", Justice Machine Jim begins his first day on the job as a police officer. That is when Dr. Badvibes decides to gain control over Jim's programming circuits and force him to go out and commit a robbery, putting Jim's career as a police officer to be ruined.
51	"The Case of the Midas Touch"	Kevin Altieri	Carl Macek	November 28, 1988	160051
Squeeky Kleen winds up having a special "Midas" glove device stuck on one of his hands, changing everything and everyone to gold (including Big Boss and Dr. BadVibes). Squeeky goes about trying to get the stubborn thing off his hand while changing everything he touches into gold, including Sundown and one of the ECTV camera droids, until eventually it is neutralized by Powderkeg. Squeeky himself along with Berserko and Rock Krusher gets time in prison for disturbing the peace.
52	"The Case of the Ready Room Mutiny"	Kevin Altieri	Ted Pedersen	November 29, 1988	160052
Bulletproof fakes a vacation trip after a failed raid on a criminal hideout and puts Sundown in charge of the entire COPS team who has a very low approval rating for Sundown's poor leadership. That way, he can engage in a secret plot to expose a certain fellow from city hall named Brannigan as a spy for Big Boss who sent him to spy on the COPS' handling of Sundown's poor leadership.
53	"The Case of the High-Iron Hoods"	Kevin Altieri	S.M. Molitor	November 30, 1988	160053
Big Boss' attempts to build the tallest skyscraper in the world to which he calls the Big Boss Building, but the Empire City Tower being built next to it is out-sizing the building, leading Big Boss to send Rock Krusher and Berserko to sabotage the construction of the tower. Meanwhile, Bullseye thinks Mace is betraying the COPS team.
54	"The Case of the Kangaroo Caper"	Kevin Altieri	Alan Templeton, Mary Crawford	December 1, 1988	160054
Sundown has to go after Rock Krusher and Louie the Plumber, who not only kidnap a famous Australian boxing kangaroo named Bruce, but Whitney Morgan as well. The two crooks are holding them both prisoners at the Empire City Park in a forested area for ransom. Sundown is able to track them down, freeing Whitney and Bruce, who is in fact a female kangaroo who has a little joey tucked inside her pouch. With the help of this special marsupial, Sundown is able to nab Louie and Krusher and get the jump on their plans.
55	"The Case of the Missing Memory"	Kevin Altieri	Reed Shelly	December 2, 1988	160055
While suffering from amnesia after being knocked out by a fallen lamp post, Sundown unwittingly teaches Big Boss' Crooks all the tricks and traits of what it is like to be a cowboy, not knowing that this is part of Big Boss' plot to use Sundown as a pawn to commit an armored truck robbery. Sundown later regains his memory and helps the COPS team put a stop to the heist and nab the rustlers along the way.
56	"The Case of the Lowest Crime"	Kevin Altieri	Bob Forward	December 5, 1988	160056
A shady drug dealer named Addictem tries to sell his dangerous drug product called Crystal Twyst to the streets of Empire City. He even tries to join up with Big Boss and his crooks to help promote the drug product, but Big Boss rejects his offer since Big Boss does not indulge in drug deealing. For once, there is a spark of morality inside this otherwise corrupt fat man. He even orders his crooks to reject Addictem's product completely, but is easier said than done. While out on a heist, Berserko accidentally falls into a crate full of Addictem's Crystal Twyst which cause him to become unconscious and be taken to the hospital. As a result, Big Boss and his Crooks join forces with COPS in a successful effort to take down Addictem and end his drug selling business for good.
57	"The Case of the Crooked Contest"	Kevin Altieri	Carole B. Mendelsohn	December 6, 1988	160057
Big Boss enrolls Nightshade and Ms. Demeanor in the Miss World Beauty Contest in order to snag the grand prize: a new car loaded with cash, jewels, and other valuables.
58	"The Case of the Ransomed Rascal"	Kevin Altieri	Larry Stryker	December 7, 1988	160058
Prince Baddin, a bratty prince who came to visit Empire City along with his father the king, gave the COPS team a read hard time with his spoiled rotten behavior which caught the attention of Berserko and Rock Krusher who kidnapped the boy and brought him to "Uncle Fatty Big Boss" and try to hold him for ransom only for the prince to manipulate the crooks into catering to his every whim, prompting the Boss to send him back to the COPS. Later the Prince learned his lesson when he tried to get on a broken down Ferris wheel to ride it only to find himself trapped on the Ferris wheel with the seats coming loose. After being rescued by LongArm, Baddin decides to change his ways and become a good prince rather than a spoiled bad prince leading the king to change his name to from Baddin to Goodin.
59	"The Case of the Spotless Kingpin"	Kevin Altieri	Deni Loubert	December 8, 1988	160059
Big Boss orders a new stain resistant suit made to completely resist dirt, but a major screw-up by Berserko causes the suit to completely pull all the dirt away from the room and bring it directly to Big Boss, covering him up completely. Squeeky tries to find a way to solve the problem before it becomes more chaotic than before.
60	"The Case of the Lawless Lady"	Kevin Altieri	Bob Forward	December 9, 1988	160060
A string of jewelry store robberies is reported the COPS team. Nightshade is falsely accused of robbing the jewelry stores and Mace believes her to be innocent, but she is planning on robbing the main jewelry store that is guarded by the mean vicious dog Shredder who is owned by the jewelry store proprietor that turns out to be the real culprit behind the robberies.
61	"The Case of the Lost Boss"	Kevin Altieri	Reed Shelly	December 12, 1988	160061
Big Boss's henchmen wonder where is their boss. After discussing plans to snag an island getaway, Big Boss is seized by an ear while going into the subway and gets kidnapped. When the crooks realize what is happening, they go out and kidnap Barricade and hold him captive assuming he and the COPS were the ones who captured Big Boss and brought him into custody. On the other hand, the crooks are unaware that it was really Big Momma, Big Boss' mother who has made a surprise move to Empire City, "kidnaps" her son, and brought him back home so she can deliver him into custody when the COPS arrive to arrest him.
62	"The Case of the Bad Luck Burglar"	Kevin Altieri	Carl Macek	December 13, 1988	160062
Buttons McBoomBoom gets upset when he loses his lucky penny: the very first penny he ever stole. He searches frantically for it in the sewers and also in his old rundown apartment house. Big Boss wants him to rob the lottery machine filled with money at the huge mall, but Buttons cannot find his lucky penny and he has been getting a lot of bad luck as a result of this. Big Boss has decided to double-cross him into robbing the lottery machine by switching his real lucky penny with a counterfeit version.
63	"The Case of Big Boss' Big Switch"	Kevin Altieri	Carl Macek	December 14, 1988	160063
Hyena pulled the old switcheroo on Bullseye by stealing his Air Raid copter and used it to pull a successful robbery on an armor truck. Bullseye on the verge of quitting the team was talked into giving himself another shot at going after the Crooks to arrest Hyena and get his helicopter back.
64	"The Case of the Red Hot Hoodlum"	Kevin Altieri	Bob Forward	December 15, 1988	160064
Rock Krusher steals a special flaming suit that causes the wearer to go up in flames, literally. With this special suit, he is able to create successful heists and escape from any trap the COPS team lays out for him just by burning through walls and floors and incinerating anything in his path. They are able to lead Krusher onto the Mountback Blimp, where they, with the help of Nancy and Cathleen, are able to trap Krusher by tricking him into melting through the floor to the outside of the blimp, causing him to get stuck through the blimp's bottom, screaming for help since his head is facing down below the city many, many feet up in the air and he is trying to hang on for dear life. Krusher gives up at that point and is placed back behind bars where he belongs.
65	"The Case of the Invisible Crime"	Kevin Altieri	Bob Forward	December 16, 1988	160065
Big Boss' crooks make themselves invisible to make things difficult for the COPS team to catch them and have an easy time committing robberies in the process. This episode features Mace being highly annoyed by Airwave and his constant babbling. Airwave is the newest member of COPS who serves the team as a communications expert and could make an excellent sportscaster if he had not chosen to be part of COPS.

=== C.O.P.S. for Kids ===
At the end of each episode of C.O.P.S., a special public service announcement (PSA) segment known as C.O.P.S. for Kids is shown either in animated form featuring the C.O.P.S. and CROOKS or in live action form with real-life police officers giving kids information about safety issues. These included staying away from drugs, gangs, how to be safe at home and on the street, and how to help in preventing crime. Each and every C.O.P.S. for Kids segment was made with the blessing and assistance of organizations like DARE, the National Crime Prevention Council and the California Highway Patrol. These segments were omitted from some international broadcasts of the show.

Title	Characters
"Don't Go Into Dark Alleys"	LongArm and Brian
Brian and a friend pass by a dark alley where Berserk lurks. Later Brian walks up to a back alley and turns away just as Rock Krusher was walking forward twirling around his handcuffs. This is an example of LongArm and his son showing everyone to go neither into dark alleys nor take deserted shortcuts because one never knows who or what is lurking in there.
"No Smoking"	LongArm and Brian
Brian has decided to try smoking a cigarette. One whiff, and he starts coughing. From this, Brian learns to think twice before smoking with Longarm affirming his decision.
"Don't Ride with Drunk Drivers"	LongArm and Brian
Brian is confronted by a carpool filled with drunken people who asks if he needs a lift. Brian remembers what his father said that "it's a bad risk to ride in the car with someone behind the wheel who's been drinking" and Brian says "No thanks" and the car speeds away only to crash into something off camera. LongArm in front of the precinct tells to the viewers to stick with good risks, as the bad risks are for people who like to lose.
"Say 'No' to Alcohol and Cigarettes"	Bulletproof
Bulletproof shows to the viewers a TV beer commercial and a smoking ad in a magazine and says that people can have a good time without smoking or drinking, which can cause an addiction to people.
"Gangs"	Rock Krusher
In his prison cell, Rock Krusher talks about his boyhood days when he was once part of a gang that got involved with a deadly brawl against a rival gang one night. He escaped and was lucky that he was merely arrested afterwards and not killed like some of his friends were. This is a rare instance of a "villain" character being allowed to host a PSA segment in a cartoon. In most PSAs, participating "villain" characters are limited to acting in a supporting role as the bad example while an established "good" character delivers the message.
"Cars Are Not Toys"	Dr. Badvibes, Buzzbomb, and Bulletproof
BadVibes and Buzzbomb were going for a ride in a car, but BadVibes realized he forgot something so he tells Buzzbomb not to play with the car while he goes for something and leaves. Disobedient, Buzzbomb started to mess around with the car and crashes it. BadVibes exclaimed "I thought I told you not to play with the car!" Then, Bulletproof tells the young viewers: "Take it from BadVibes, kids. Cars are not toys. Besides, you're not as replaceable as Buzzbomb is".
"Vandalism"	Mace
Mace expresses how much he hates graffiti. He hates it because it is hard to clean it up and costs money to do so. Secondly, he hates it most of all because it is against the law, especially when a troublesome kid sprays graffiti on Mace's uniform.
"Play Away from Cars"	MainFrame
With the help of Waldo, the robot, Mainframe tells the young viewers that since they are much too small to be seen by drivers moving in their cars, they are to play away from cars so they will not get hurt by them.
"Traffic Safety"	MainFrame
Two kids are playing ball. Then the ball goes out into the street. Mainframe discourages one of the little kids from going out and getting the ball. A car comes and runs over it. Streets are for cars, not for kids. Mainframe tells the younger viewers to never go out into the street (even if a toy does), because toys can be replaced, not kids.
"Don't Flash Your Cash"	Big Boss and Squeeky Kleen
Big Boss and Squeeky Kleen at the mall show to the viewers how one must never flash his/her cash in front of the crowd with Squeeky showing off an example of this the hard way, which is by getting mugged and whipped by thugs when he flashes some wad of cash in front of them. This is another of the rare instances where a villain character hosts a PSA segment.
"Bicycle Safety"	Highway
Highway shows off his normal bicycle while discussing a few bicycle safety tips to the viewers. Berserko did not care. Instead, he rode down just the opposite of where one is supposed to go while bike riding down the road and crashed into a car pulling out in front of him. Highway turns around to see if Berserko is all right and says to the viewers, "Don't be Bicycling Berserko. Ride safe. Ride right".
"Don't Steal Traffic Signs"	Highway
Highway tells the viewers never to steal traffic signs and shows an example of a kid showing off a large stop sign he has stolen from a street corner to a group of kids meeting inside of a clubhouse.

== Broadcast ==
C.O.P.S. was broadcast in syndication from 1988 to 1990. On November 21 and 28, 1989, Record Breakers pre-empted the series. The program was re-titled Cyber C.O.P.S. and re-run on CBS from March 27 to September 4, 1993. It was re-run again on the USA Network from January 2 to March 9, 1995, under its original title.

== Comics ==
A 15-issue series based on the show was published by DC Comics.

== Home media ==
Sterling Entertainment Group released a DVD called C.O.P.S. – Fighting Crime in a Future Time on November 13, 2003. Unlike the later released boxsets, Part 1 of "The Case of C.O.P.S. File #1" includes the introduction scenes of Highway and Sundown.

Shout! Factory released C.O.P.S. – Volume 1 on February 28, 2006, a four-disc boxset featuring the first 22 uncut episodes on DVD in its original broadcast presentation in Region 1. It includes original concept art, storyboard-to-screen, and some of the original PSAs that were shown after the episodes. Volume 2 featuring 21 episodes was released as a Shout! Factory select title, available exclusively through their online store.

Mill Creek Entertainment acquired the rights to the series, releasing Volume 1, featuring the first 32 episodes of the series, on February 15, 2011 which includes a bonus episode of Hey Vern, It's Ernest!. Volume 2, featuring the remaining 33 episodes, was released on September 13, 2011 which includes slideshow of concept art and a trailer for Jayce and the Wheeled Warriors. They released C.O.P.S. – The Complete Series on DVD in Region 1 on March 14, 2017.

DVD name	Ep #	Release date
C.O.P.S. Volume 1	32	February 15, 2011
C.O.P.S. Volume 2	33	September 13, 2011
C.O.P.S. Complete Series	65	March 14, 2017

== Reception ==
Hal Erickson, author of Television Cartoon Shows, An Illustrated Encyclopedia stated that "C.O.P.S. had potential – though it was a potential left unrealized by the dishearteningly flat animation style". Erickson noted that C.O.P.S. "scored with a sturdy inner lining of social satire" such as Mayor Davis' cost-cutting attempts that would unwittingly aid the cause of the villain. IGN gave the show a rating of three out of ten, stating that "to fully appreciate this series one must have a tolerance for clunky, mechanical animation (the kind that says 'We really didn't spend too much money on it') and a love for '80s-style action"; and that "it offers little in terms of character development. I mean, all any kid needs to know is the C.O.P.S are the good guys and Big Boss and crew are the bad guys. Beyond that, the cartoon does offer one element to behold: its emphasis on gadgetry".

== Bibliography ==
- Erickson, Hal (2005). Television Cartoon Shows. Vol. 1 (2nd ed.). McFarland & Company. ISBN 0786422556.
