= Trevor Ranson =

Australian rules footballer, born 1912

Personal information
- Full name: Vincent Trevor Ranson
- Born: 29 March 1912; Scottsdale, Tasmania
- Died: 6 October 1996 (aged 84); Launceston, Tasmania
- Original team: Launceston
- Height: 187 cm (6 ft 2 in)
- Weight: 85 kg (187 lb)
- Position: Defender

Playing career^{1}
Years	Club	Games (Goals)
1932–33, 1935–45	Launceston	140 (?)
1934	St Kilda	2 (0)
1948	Scottsdale	? (?)
- ^{1} Playing statistics correct to the end of 1948.

Vincent Trevor Ranson (29 March 1912 – 6 October 1996) was an Australian rules footballer who played for Launceston and Scottsdale in the Northern Tasmanian Football Association (NTFA) and St Kilda in the Victorian Football League (VFL). He was inducted into the Tasmanian Football Hall of Fame in 2005.

Ranson appeared in the opening two rounds of the 1934 VFL season before succumbing to a knee injury. He then returned to his original club, Launceston, where he participated in seven premiership teams. A NTFA representative, Ranson also represented Tasmania at the 1933 Sydney Carnival. He played as a defender and won Launceston's 'Best and Fairest' award in 1937. Ranson captain-coached them to the 1945 premiership, and later joined Scottsdale as their inaugural captain-coach in 1948.

Ranson also served in the Australian Army during World War II.
