= Geoff Hill (Australian footballer) =

Australian rules footballer

Personal information
- Full name: Geoff Hill
- Born: 14 August 1936
- Died: 2 September 1982 (aged 46)
- Original team: New Norfolk
- Height: 182 cm (6 ft 0 in)
- Weight: 75 kg (165 lb)

Playing career^{1}
Years	Club	Games (Goals)
1959–60	Fitzroy	18 (0)
- ^{1} Playing statistics correct to the end of 1960.

Geoff Hill (14 August 1936 – 2 September 1982) was a former Australian rules footballer who played with Fitzroy in the Victorian Football League (VFL).

Hill made his senior debut for New Norfolk in the Tasmanian Football League on his 18th birthday and played for them until joining Fitzroy in 1959. Later in his career he returned to New Norfolk and was a member of the 1968 premiership team under coach Trevor Leo.

He was inducted into the Tasmanian Football Hall of Fame in 2013.
