= Bill Wedding =

Australian rules footballer

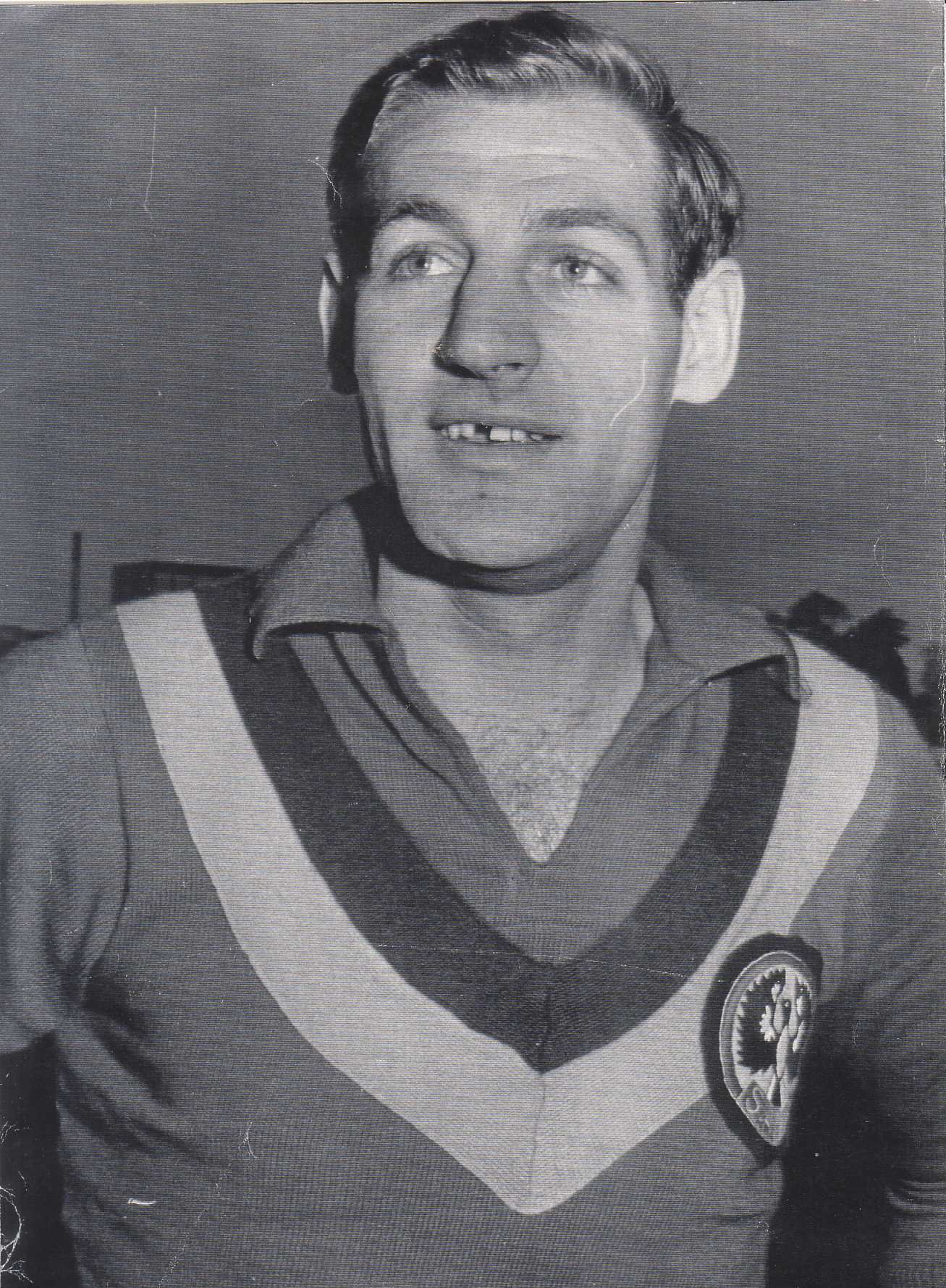

Personal information
- Full name: Kingsley Arthur Wedding
- Born: October 1935
- Died: 30 June 2007 (aged 71)
- Position: Ruckman

Playing career^{1}
Years	Club	Games (Goals)
1957–1968	Norwood	214 (100)
- ^{1} Playing statistics correct to the end of 1968.

Kingsley Arthur "Bill" Wedding (October 1935 – 30 June 2007) was an Australian rules footballer who played for Norwood in the South Australian National Football League (SANFL). He was one of the inaugural inductees into the South Australian Football Hall of Fame, in 2002.

Wedding first played with Norwood in 1957 but wasn't able to cement his spot in the side and spent the following season in the seconds, where he won a Magarey Medal. A knock ruckman, he was at his best in the early 1960s and took out Norwood's 'Club Champion' award every year from 1961 to 1965.

Some of Wedding's best performances came at interstate level, where he out-rucked footballers to the calibre of John Nicholls and Polly Farmer. He was selected in the All-Australian team after the 1961 Brisbane Carnival and also represented South Australia at the 1966 Hobart Carnival. In all he appeared in 19 matches for his state.
