= John Ahern (footballer) =

Australian rules footballer

Personal information
- Full name: John Ahern
- Born: 10 September 1970 (age 56)
- Original team: MHSOB
- Height: 189 cm (6 ft 2 in)
- Weight: 82 kg (181 lb)

Playing career^{1}
Years	Club	Games (Goals)
1989–1990	Melbourne	2 (0)
1991	North Melbourne	0 (0)
1992	Port Adelaide (SANFL)	4 (2)
- ^{1} Playing statistics correct to the end of 1991.

John Ahern (born 10 September 1970) is a former professional Australian rules footballer who played for Melbourne Football Club in the Victorian Football League (VFL).

Recruited from Melbourne High School Old Boys Association, Ahern made his VFL debut in round 1 in 1989 against Fitzroy, having eight disposals. Ahern was then dropped until round 22, the final round of the season, when he reappeared against Essendon.

Ahern played three further senior matches for Melbourne in 1990 before being traded to North Melbourne for Paul Bryce. Ahern did not player senior football for North Melbourne and was delisted at the end of the 1991 season. South Australian National Football League (SANFL) club Port Adelaide recruited Ahern but after an unsuccessful 1992 season Ahern retired from football.

Following his retirement, Ahern began a career in hospitality by obtaining the lease of the Mortlake Pub TAB. The successful creation of the Hamilton Sporting Club was his first major project from conception to completion from 1994 to 1997.

During the next five years Ahern managed major hospitality venues overseas and in Melbourne including the Skinny Dog Hotel, Crockford Bay Hotel and the Flower Hotel. In 2002 with a strong management background he moved into ownership, commencing with successful nightclub Aqua.

Ahern currently has interests in a number of hotels around Australia.

== Sources ==
- Holmesby, R & Main, J. (2002) The Encyclopedia of AFL Footballers: Every AFL/VFL Player Since 1897, Crown Content, Melbourne.
