= Harry Long (footballer) =

Australian rules footballer, born 1910

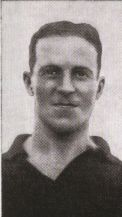

Personal information
- Full name: Harry Conrad Long
- Born: 13 February 1910; Tea Tree, Tasmania
- Died: 29 July 2003 (aged 93)
- Original team: Launceston
- Height: 182 cm (6 ft 0 in)
- Weight: 79 kg (174 lb)
- Position: Defender

Playing career^{1}
Years	Club	Games (Goals)
1929–1937	Melbourne	117 (21)
- ^{1} Playing statistics correct to the end of 1937.

Harry Conrad Long (13 February 1910 – 29 July 2003) was an Australian rules footballer who played for Melbourne in the Victorian Football League (VFL).

Launceston's Harry Long made his VFL debut in 1929 and was with Melbourne for most of the 1930s, including a stint as vice-captain. He was a losing preliminary finalist in his last two seasons and retired just before the club claimed their three successive premierships under Checker Hughes. A half back, he also played at Lefroy in Tasmania and in 2005 was inducted into the Tasmanian Football Hall of Fame.
