= Darryn Perry =

Australian rules footballer

Darryn Perry is a former Australian rules footballer who played in Tasmania during the 1980s and 1990s. He was inducted into the Tasmanian Football Hall of Fame in 2012.

Perry played for North Hobart in the Tasmanian Football League (TFL).
