= David McQuestin =

David Malcolm McQuestin (25 June 1943 – 24 May 2008) was a journalist and sports editor who worked on air in radio and television in Tasmania from the 1960s to the 1970s and later in management within the broadcasting sector. He was inducted into the Tasmanian Football Hall of Fame in 2006.

McQuestin began his broadcasting career with Radio 7EX and TNT-9 in the early 1960s. In 1964 he was the initial host of the locally produced television program “Sports Club.” He remained in that role until the mid-1970s before moving into the business sector.

In his youth McQuestin was quite a good footballer, being a member of the City-South under 19s 1961 premiership team in the Northern Tasmanian Football Association (1886–1986).
