= Alf Oldham =

Australian rules footballer

Personal information
- Full name: Alfred Oldham
- Born: 16 October 1899
- Died: 26 September 1972 (aged 72)
- Original team: Launceston
- Height: 182 cm (6 ft 0 in)
- Weight: 76 kg (168 lb)

Playing career^{1}
Years	Club	Games (Goals)
1922	Melbourne	3 (2)
- ^{1} Playing statistics correct to the end of 1922.

Alfred Oldham (16 October 1899 – 26 September 1972) was an Australian rules footballer who played for the Melbourne Football Club in the Victorian Football League (VFL).
