= Roy Bailey (Australian footballer) =

Australian rules footballer

Personal information
- Born: 1889; Albany, Western Australia
- Died: 1935 (aged 45–46)
- Original team: Lefroy (TANFL)

Career highlights
- 2 time Lefroy premiership player 1907, 1912; 1 Tasmanian State Premiership 1912; 1 Lefroy Best and Fairest 1909; Tasmanian National Carnival representative 1908 (Melbourne), 1911 (Adelaide), 1914 (Sydney – Captain); 12 representative matches for Tasmania, 1908–1914; Inductee No.2 into the Tasmanian Football Hall of Fame in 2005

Roy Bailey (1889–1935) was an Australian rules footballer who played for the Lefroy Football Club in the Tasmanian Football League between 1907–1914.

== Football career ==
Bailey was of Tasmanian Football's first star players and in 1907 became a regular player in the Lefroy team. In the next eight seasons, Bailey was one of the finest defenders in Tasmania.

Bailey played in 2 premierships for Lefroy in the TFL 1907, 1912 and 1 State Premiership also in 1912.

Bailey would not play football after 1914, ending his career aged 25.
