= Col Stokes =

Australian rules footballer

Col Skirving Stokes (23 October 1905 – 14 September 1980) was an Australian rules footballer who played in Tasmania between 1926 and 1937, reached representative level and was a leading goalkicker at both club and competition level.

Col Stokes played for Longford in the Northern Tasmanian Football Association and for much of his career was one of the leading goalkickers in the competition.

Stokes was chosen in a number of NTFA sides for representative intrastate matches.

He was inducted into the Tasmanian Football Hall of Fame in 2008.
