= John Fitzallen =

Australian rules footballer (1934–2017)

John Douglas Fitzallen (13 November 1934 – 11 October 2017) was an Australian rules footballer who played in Tasmania during the 1950s and 1960s. He represented the state several times in interstate matches including the Brisbane Carnival in 1961. He was inducted into the Tasmanian Football Hall of Fame in 2006.

== Early career ==
Fitzallen grew up at Tunbridge in the midlands of Tasmania and began his football career with that club as a teenager. In 1952 and 1953 he won the club's best and fairest award.

== Longford ==
Fitzallen played for Longford in the Northern Tasmanian Football Association (NTFA) from 1954 to 1961.

He was a member of the club's premiership teams in 1955, 1957 and 1958, and also played in the NTFA Grand Finals of 1959, 1961.

Fitzallen's career came to a sudden and unexpected end when a railway work accident resulted in a broken leg prior to the start of the 1962 season. He was making a satisfactory recovery until mid-June that year when another accident at home resulted in the leg being broken again.
