= Harry Luck =

Australian rules footballer

Personal information
- Full name: Henry James Luck
- Born: 28 October 1876; Westbury, Tasmania
- Died: 8 October 1923 (aged 46); Mowbray, Tasmania
- Original team: Launceston (NTFA)

Playing career^{1}
Years	Club	Games (Goals)
1901	St Kilda	8 (0)
- ^{1} Playing statistics correct to the end of 1901.

Henry James Luck (28 October 1876 – 8 October 1923) was an Australian rules footballer who played with St Kilda in the Victorian Football League (VFL).
