= Rex Lethborg =

Australian rules footballer

Rex Arthur Lethborg (born about 1936) is a former Australian rules footballer who played in Tasmania during the 1950s and 1960s and was selected at representative level.

Lethborg played for Scottsdale in the Northern Tasmanian Football Association (NTFA) as a forward pocket/rover. He was runner-up in the club Best & Fairest in 1956, and club leading goalkicker a number of times between 1955 and 1965. His best individual effort in a match was nine goals versus East Launceston in 1961 (Round 18).

He was a member of Scottsdale's premiership teams in 1964 and 1965, kicking five goals himself in the latter game.

Lethborg represented Tasmania at the 1961 Brisbane Carnival.
