= Michael Lockman =

Australian rules footballer

Personal information
- Full name: Michael Lockman
- Born: 29 August 1963 (age 63)
- Original team: East Malvern (VAFA)
- Height: 185 cm (6 ft 1 in)
- Weight: 85 kg (187 lb)

Playing career^{1}
Years	Club	Games (Goals)
1983, 1986	Richmond	4 (0)
1986–1987	Collingwood	15 (3)
1988	Sydney Swans	11 (1)
Total		30 (4)
- ^{1} Playing statistics correct to the end of 1988.

Michael Lockman (born 29 August 1963) is a former Australian rules footballer who played with Richmond, Collingwood and the Sydney Swans in the Victorian Football League (VFL).

Originally from Victorian Amateur Football Association (VAFA) club East Malvern, Lockman had two separate stints at Richmond. After debuting for Richmond in 1983, he was unable to break back into the league side and went to South Australian National Football League (SANFL) club South Adelaide for the 1985 SANFL season before returning to Richmond in 1986. After playing three games early that season, Lockman was traded to Collingwood where he finished the season. He made the move north to Sydney in 1988 and appeared in the opening 11 rounds of the season but didn't feature in the second half of the year. In the 1989 pre season he nominated for the draft but was unable to attract a fourth VFL club.

Lockman went on to become a coach and was in charge of TFL Statewide League club Launceston in 1996 and 1997.
