= Colin Jackson (Australian footballer) =

Australian rules footballer, born 1906

Personal information
- Full name: Colin Frank Jackson
- Born: 6 March 1906; Launceston, Tasmania
- Died: 7 August 1977 (aged 71); Launceston, Tasmania
- Original team: City/Longford/Launceston
- Height: 185 cm (6 ft 1 in)
- Weight: 82 kg (181 lb)
- Position: Wing

Playing career^{1}
Years	Club	Games (Goals)
1930	Melbourne	2 (0)
- ^{1} Playing statistics correct to the end of 1930.

Colin Frank Jackson (6 March 1906 – 7 August 1977) was an Australian rules footballer who played with Melbourne in the Victorian Football League (VFL).
