= Bob Miller (Australian footballer) =

Australian rules footballer

Bob L. Miller

Personal information
- Full name: Robert Leonard Miller
- Born: 31 October 1923; Carlton, Victoria
- Died: 19 August 1993 (aged 69); Launceston, Tasmania
- Original team: East Brunswick
- Height: 178 cm (5 ft 10 in)
- Weight: 70 kg (154 lb)

Playing career^{1}
Years	Club	Games (Goals)
1946–1950	Fitzroy	44 (3)
- ^{1} Playing statistics correct to the end of 1950.

Robert Leonard Miller (31 October 1923 – 19 August 1993) was an Australian rules footballer who played for Fitzroy in the Victorian Football League (VFL) during the late 1940s.

Miller, originally from East Brunswick, spent five seasons at Fitzroy. He played the first couple of years under 1944 premiership captain-coach Fred Hughson and although Miller took part in losing 1947 Preliminary Final side, the club were on the decline.

He then became a successful coach in Tasmania, steering City-South to premierships and in 2002 was announced as coach of their official 'Team of the Century'. Miller was also an inaugural inductee into the Tasmanian Football Hall of Fame, in 2005.
