= Paul Bryce =

Australian rules footballer

Personal information
- Born: 12 July 1968 (age 58)
- Original team: Wangaratta Rovers (OMFL)
- Height: 194 cm (6 ft 4 in)
- Weight: 95 kg (209 lb)

Playing career^{1}
Years	Club	Games (Goals)
1987–1990	North Melbourne	48 (26)
1991–1992	Melbourne	26 (3)
1993	Sydney Swans	17 (14)
Total		91 (43)
- ^{1} Playing statistics correct to the end of 1993.

Paul Bryce (born 12 July 1968) is a former Australian rules footballer who played with North Melbourne, Melbourne and the Sydney Swans in the Victorian/Australian Football League (VFL/AFL).

Bryce was a defender but was also used in the ruck and up forward. After making his debut as an 18-year-old in 1987, Bryce played regular games over the next three seasons.

A former Wangaratta Rovers player, he was traded to Melbourne for John Ahern before the 1991 season and took part in his first final that year.

He found himself at his third club in 1993 when Sydney selected him with the third pick of the pre-season draft and despite playing 17 games that season he was delisted at the end of the year.

Later in the decade, Bryce captained and coached Launceston in the Northern Tasmanian Football League.
