= Kevin Northcote =

Australian rules footballer

Personal information
- Full name: John Kevin Northcote
- Born: 27 July 1938
- Died: 19 December 2008 (aged 70); Edenhope, Victoria
- Original team: Hawthorn Colts
- Height: 175 cm (5 ft 9 in)
- Weight: 75 kg (165 lb)

Playing career^{1}
Years	Club	Games (Goals)
1956–1959	Hawthorn	14 (6)
- ^{1} Playing statistics correct to the end of 1959.

John Kevin Northcote (27 July 1938 – 19 December 2008) was an Australian rules footballer. He played 14 games for Hawthorn in the VFL between 1956 and 1959 and kicked six goals. His debut match was the 1956 Round 12 clash with Collingwood at Victoria Park.

He then moved to country leagues and played with Rupanyup in Victoria from 1960 to 1961, West Gambier Football Club in South Australia in 1962, and Moe Football Club in 1963.

Northcote later moved to Tasmania and played with Launceston in the NTFA during the 1965 season.
