= Harden Dean =

Australian rules footballer, born 1913

Personal information
- Full name: Phillip Harden Dean
- Born: 13 October 1913; Launceston, Tasmania
- Died: 23 August 1982 (aged 68); Geelong, Victoria
- Original team: Launceston
- Height: 178 cm (5 ft 10 in)
- Weight: 80 kg (176 lb)

Playing career^{1}
Years	Club	Games (Goals)
1936–38, 1943	Melbourne	4 (0)
- ^{1} Playing statistics correct to the end of 1943.

Phillip Harden Dean (13 October 1913 – 23 August 1982) was an Australian rules footballer who played with Melbourne in the Victorian Football League (VFL).
