= Robert Dutton (footballer) =

Australian rules footballer

Personal information
- Full name: Robert Dutton
- Nickname: Major
- Born: 9 October 1957 (age 69)
- Original team: Launceston
- Height: 192 cm (6 ft 4 in)
- Weight: 89 kg (196 lb)

Playing career^{1}
Years	Club	Games (Goals)
1981	Carlton	1 (0)
1982	Hawthorn	1 (0)
Total		2 (0)
- ^{1} Playing statistics correct to the end of 1982.

Robert Dutton (born 9 October 1957) is a former Australian rules footballer who played with Carlton and Hawthorn in the Victorian Football League (VFL). After his VFL career concluded, he moved back to his home state of Tasmania and played for Clarence.
