= Rod Butler =

Australian rules footballer

Rod Butler (born 12 February 1953) is a former Australian rules footballer who played in Tasmania between 1971 and 1985. He was inducted into the Tasmanian Football Hall of Fame in 2012.

Butler played for Latrobe in the North West Football Union. He won the club Best and Fairest award in 1972 and was runner-up in 1978.
