= Paddy Walsh =

Australian rules footballer

Personal information
- Full name: Patrick Yost Walsh
- Born: 21 August 1906; Branxholm
- Died: 3 August 1988 (aged 81); Launceston
- Original team: Legerwood
- Height: 184 cm (6 ft 0 in)
- Weight: 92 kg (203 lb)

Playing career^{1}
Years	Club	Games (Goals)
1927–1936	Essendon	115 (20)
- ^{1} Playing statistics correct to the end of 1936.

Career highlights
- Essendon best and fairest: 1933; Essendon most serviceable player: 1929; Essendon Life Member: 1961; Representative: Intra-State matches (VFL): 1927, 1928; Inter-State matches (VFL): 1929, 1932, 1933

Patrick Yost Walsh (21 August 1906 – 3 August 1988) was an Australian rules footballer who played with the Essendon Football Club in the VFL/AFL.

== Family ==
The son of Michael Walsh (1867–1942), and Matilda Walsh (1864–1947), née Yost.

== Football ==
Having attracted the Essendon club's attention, as one of the best players on the ground during Essendon's Tasmanian tour match against a combined North-Eastern Football team, at Scottsdale on 28 July 1926 (Essendon coach Syd Barker officiated as field umpire), he was recruited in 1927.

Walsh was a left-footed ruckman who won the Essendon Best and Fairest award in 1933. He played 115 games for the club over 10 seasons, and represented Victoria at interstate football 12 times in his career. He badly injured his knee in Essendon's 4 June 1934 (round 5) match against Richmond (his 105th senior game), and did not play again that season.

He resumed his career in 1935, and played another 12 senior games before he announced his retirement after the 18 July 1936 (round 11) against Footscrary.

"Walsh was an excellent ruck man with great natural ability and was big and powerful with plenty of dash and good on the ground. He played the game vigorously and was a reliable mark and could be devastating on his day. He won the best and fairest award in 1933."

He was employed by the Melbourne and Metropolitan Fire Brigade – as were his team-mates Garnet Campbell, Jack Vosti, Ernie Watson, and Len Webster.

He was made a life member of the Essendon Football Club in 1961.

== VFL Representation ==
He was selected for VFL representative teams in thirteen Intra-State and Inter-State matches over six different years; however, although selected to represent the VFL in the 1930 ANFC Adelaide Carnival – in which he could have played another five games for the Victorian team in Adelaide (see: Carnival's Victorian Matches) – he was forced to withdraw from the team because he could not get leave from his employment as a fireman.

=== Intra-State VFL team ===
- 1927: VFL vs. Gippsland League, Bairnsdale.
- 1928: VFL vs. Ovens and Murray League, Wangaratta.

=== Interstate VFL team ===
- 1929: VFL vs. West Australian Football League, in Perth, 6 July 1929.
- 1929: VFL vs. West Australian Football League, in Perth, 9 July 1929.
- 1929: VFL vs. South Australian Football League, in Adelaide, 13 July 1929.
- 1930: VFL team for ANFC Adelaide Carnival (selected but withdrew due to work pressure).
- 1932: VFL vs. Tasmania, at North Hobart, on 11 June 1932.
- 1932: VFL vs. South Australia, in Adelaide, on 6 August 1932.
- 1933: VFL vs. New South Wales (selected as follower/first ruck), at the Sydney Cricket Ground, on 2 August 1933, during the 1933 ANFC Sydney Carnival.
- 1933: VFL vs. West Australia (selected as nineteenth man, replaced Geelong's Jack Collins in the last quarter), at the Sydney Cricket Ground, on 5 August 1933, during the 1933 ANFC Sydney Carnival.
- 1933: VFL vs. South Australia (selected as back-pocket/second ruck), at the Sydney Cricket Ground, on 7 August 1933, during the 1933 ANFC Sydney Carnival.
- 1933: VFL vs. Tasmania (selected as back-pocket/second ruck), at the Sydney Cricket Ground, on 10 August 1933, during the 1933 ANFC Sydney Carnival.
- 1933: Final Match: VFL vs. South Australia (selected as back-pocket/second ruck), at the Sydney Cricket Ground, on 12 August 1933, during the 1933 ANFC Sydney Carnival.

== Hall of Fame (Tasmania) ==
He was one of the inaugural inductees (at No.25 of the total 130 selected) into the Tasmanian Football Hall of Fame in 2005.
