= Bruce Armstrong (Australian footballer) =

Australian rules footballer

Personal information
- Born: 3 November 1943
- Died: 5 September 2004 (aged 60)
- Original team: Scottsdale
- Height: 183 cm (6 ft 0 in)
- Weight: 82 kg (181 lb)

Playing career^{1}
Years	Club	Games (Goals)
1965–1966	Essendon	7 (0)
- ^{1} Playing statistics correct to the end of 1966.

Bruce Armstrong (3 November 1943 – 5 September 2004) was an Australian rules footballer who played with Essendon in the Victorian Football League (VFL).

Armstrong, a Tasmanian, was recruited from Scottsdale. Used as a follower and defender, Armstrong played with the seconds from 1963, with his seven senior appearances coming in the 1965 VFL season (4) and 1966 VFL season (3). He captain-coached Hampden Football League club Warrnambool in 1968 and 1969. From 1970 to 1972, Armstrong played with Launceston in the Northern Tasmanian Football Association, the first as coach. In 1973 he went to Longford, also in the NTFA.
