= Ray James =

Raymond Russell Neill James (c. 1941 – 15 February 2011) was a former journalist and sports editor who worked in radio and television in Tasmania from the 1960s to the 1990s.

James began his broadcasting career with Radio 7HO in Hobart. By the mid-1970s, he had moved to Launceston and taken the role of hosting Sports Club on TNT-9. James remained in that role until the program ceased in the early 1990s.

James became a great stalwart of television sport in Northern Tasmania. He covered all the local and national football events from the 1970s to the early 1990s, bringing regional and statewide football into every loungeroom. James's traditional post-NTFS grand final broadcasts were popular. His strong focus on junior sport in the region helped promote football and all other sports to juniors and youth.

James was inducted into the Tasmanian Football Hall of Fame in 2008 for his media contribution to the game of Australian Football.
