= Stan Morcom =

Australian rules footballer (1936–1992)

Personal information
- Full name: Stanley James Morcom
- Born: 7 February 1936
- Died: 2 March 1992 (aged 56)
- Original team: Malvern Amateurs
- Height: 183 cm (6 ft 0 in)
- Weight: 81 kg (179 lb)
- Position: Centre

Playing career^{1}
Years	Club	Games (Goals)
1952–58	Richmond	58 (17)
- ^{1} Playing statistics correct to the end of 1958.

Stanley James Morcom (7 February 1936 – 2 March 1992) was an Australian rules footballer who played with Richmond in the Victorian Football League (VFL).
