= Ian Mort =

Australian rules footballer

Personal information
- Full name: Ian Carnegie Mort
- Born: 4 April 1937; Kew, Victoria
- Died: 19 January 1996 (aged 58); Melbourne, Victoria
- Original team: Kew Amateurs (VAFA)
- Height: 187 cm (6 ft 2 in)
- Weight: 89 kg (196 lb)

Playing career^{1}
Years	Club	Games (Goals)
1960–1964	Hawthorn	73 (56)
- ^{1} Playing statistics correct to the end of 1964.

Ian Carnegie Mort (4 April 1937 – 19 January 1996) was an Australian rules footballer who played for Hawthorn in the VFL during the early 1960s.

The son of former Hawthorn player Harry Mort and Verna Frances Hinde, Mort played as a half forward flanker and was a member of Hawthorn's 1961 premiership team.
