= Simon Atkins (footballer) =

Australian rules footballer, born 1968

Personal information
- Born: 23 December 1968 (age 57)
- Original team: Wynyard (NWFU)

Playing career^{1}
Years	Club	Games (Goals)
1987–1994	Footscray	127 (76)
1995–1996	Fitzroy	41 (13)
Total		168 (89)
- ^{1} Playing statistics correct to the end of 1996.

Career highlights
- Twice Footscray best and fairest runner-up

Simon Atkins (born 23 December 1968) is a former Australian rules football player who played with Footscray and Fitzroy Football Clubs in the Victorian (VFL) and Australian Football Leagues (AFL) from 1987 to 1996.

Nicknamed "The Axe", Atkins and his twin brother Paul were recruited from Wynyard Football Club in Tasmania and Atkins made his senior VFL debut in Round Two, 1987, against the Sydney Swans at the Sydney Cricket Ground (SCG), gathering three possessions in a 108-point loss to Sydney.

After only three matches in 1987 and none in 1988, Atkins became a key player at Footscray in 1989, playing 21 matches before his best season in 1990, when Atkins topped the competition in handballs.

Atkins played most of his football as a centreman, complementing a strong midfield that also comprised the Brownlow Medallists Scott Wynd and Tony Liberatore. This successful combination was one of the reasons that Footscray made it to the preliminary final in 1992 after having a season that took most experts by surprise (remembering that the club almost disappeared at the end of the 1989 season).

Atkins is best remembered as a consistent winner of the ball who had a great capacity to feed the ball out to teammates from tight situations with "quick hands". His best seasons were in 1991 and 1992. When Alan Joyce took over from Terry Wheeler at the end of round two in 1994, it soon became clear that Atkins was not an automatic selection for a midfield role, and he was traded to Fitzroy at the end of that season. Holmesby and Main describe Atkins as "one of the side's best in its last two seasons" (referring to Fitzroy's last two seasons in the AFL), and "at his peak ... he was one of the most productive midfielders in the competition". Another attribute he is remembered for is the ability to kick goals from one quick step at the 50-metre mark. His return of 76 goals in 127 games with the Bulldogs is a very good one for a centreman. He was also the last person to kick a goal for Fitzroy in the AFL.

Atkins played a role as a special comments man during the ABC's Victorian Football League coverage in the late 2000s.

After retiring as a player, Atkins coached Werribee in the Victorian Football League between 2005 and 2010. In 2013 he will be an assistant coach for St Bernards Old Collegians in the Victorian Amateur Football Association.
