= Bill Herron =

Australian rules footballer

Personal information
- Full name: William Anderson Herron
- Original team: West Perth

Playing career^{1}
Years	Club	Games (Goals)
1954-1956	West Perth (WAFL)	4 (2)
1959-1962	Glenelg (SANFL)	64 (24)
Total		68 (26)
- ^{1} Playing statistics correct to the end of 1962.

Career highlights
- Glenelg Football Club Captain 1961; State representative for South Australia 1961; Glenelg Football Club Life Member

Bill Herron is a former Australian rules footballer who played for West Perth in the Western Australian Football League (WAFL), and Glenelg in the South Australian National Football League (SANFL).
