= Roger Browning =

Australian rules footballer

Roger Browning is a former Australian rules footballer who played in Tasmania between 1960 and 1964, being selected in regional and state representative teams several times.

Browning (born in about 1940) played for New Norfolk in the Tasmanian Football League (TFL), starring as a "rugged follower and forward" from quite early in his career. He won the TFL best and fairest William Leitch Medal in 1961 and 1962.

At club level he was voted best and fairest for New Norfolk in 1960, 1961 and 1962, and shared the award in 1963 with Anthony Walsh.

Due to a serious injury, his career came to an end at a young age.

Browning was inducted into the Tasmanian Football Hall of Fame in 2012.
