= John Halbert =

Australian rules footballer

Personal information
- Full name: John Arno Halbert
- Born: 5 September 1937 (age 89); Hyde Park, South Australia
- Height: 5 ft 11 1/2 in (182 cm)
- Weight: 13 st 4 lb (84 kg)

Playing career^{1}
Years	Club	Games (Goals)
1955–1968	Sturt	244 (253)

Representative team honours
Years	Team	Games (Goals)
	South Australia	16

Coaching career
Years	Club	Games (W–L–D)
1979–1982	Glenelg	97 (64–31–2)
1983–1984	Sturt	48 (26–22–0)
Total		145 (90–53–2)
- ^{1} Playing statistics correct to the end of 1984.

Career highlights
- SANFL Premiership player: (1966); Magarey Medal: (1961); Sturt captain: (1962–1968); 4× P.T. Morton Medal: (1958, 1960, 1961, 1964); All-Australian team: (1961); South Australian Football Hall of Fame, inducted 2002; Australian Football Hall of Fame, inducted 2017

John Arno Halbert MBE AM (born 5 September 1937) is a former Australian rules footballer who played for the Sturt Football Club in the South Australian National Football League (SANFL).

A member of the Australian Football Hall of Fame, Halbert has had a long involvement in Australian rules football in South Australia, as a player, coach and administrator. Halbert was also a Bradman Medalist in the 1961–62 and 1964–65 seasons, denoting the greatest domestic cricketer in the State for that season. He is the only person in history to claim the title of Magarey Medalist and Bradman Medalist.

== Playing career ==
Halbert was a centreman and first played for Sturt in 1955. In his debut season he finished second in the Magarey Medal count to Lindsay Head and in 1958 was again the runner up with Head winning another Medal. He also polled well in 1960 but again finished second, this time losing to Barrie Barbary. The Medal was finally his in 1961, his 20 votes enough to hold off the challengers. Sturt actually finished with the wooden spoon that season but it was a good year for Halbert: as well as winning that elusive Magarey Medal he was also picked in the All Australian team after his performances for the South Australians at the Brisbane Carnival. He represented South Australia at interstate football at total of 17 times during his career. In 1962 he was made captain of Sturt and led them to a premiership in 1966, their first flag since 1940. Injuries prevented Halbert from playing in Sturt's 1967 and 1968 premiership sides, and he was forced to retire. He finished with a then club record 251 SANFL games.

== Coaching career ==
In 1979 he became coach of Glenelg, leading them to the 1981 and 1982 SANFL Grand Finals where they were beaten by Port Adelaide and Norwood respectively. He left The Bay after the 1982 Grand Final and replaced the legendary coach of Sturt, Jack Oatey in 1983. Halbert would lead the Double Blues to his third Grand Final appearance in three years but again luck was against him when Sturt were defeated by West Adelaide. After the Double Blues could win only eight matches in 1984 and finished seventh, Halbert was controversially sacked and replaced by Mervyn Keane. It was his last senior coaching position in the SANFL, although he became a state selector during the late 1980s and through the 1990s, and after Davies resigned at the end of 1989 Halbert said he would consider rejoining the Double Blues, although the club showed no interest.

Halbert was inducted into the Australian Football Hall of Fame in 2017.

He also played two first-class cricket matches for South Australia in the 1961–62 season.
