= Launceston Football Club =

Launceston

Names
- Full name: Launceston Football Club
- Nickname: Blues
- Former nickname: Raiders
- Club song: "Onwards to Victory"

2021 (TSL) season
- After finals: Premiers
- Home-and-away season: 1st
- Leading goalkicker: Dylan Riley (59)

Club details
- Founded: 1875; 151 years ago First season: 1882 (NFA), 2009 (TSL)
- Colours
- Competition: NTFA Premier League
- President: Sandra Boland
- Coach: Mitch Thorp
- Captain: Hamish Leedham
- Ground: Windsor Park

Uniforms
Home

Other information
- Official website: launcestonfc.com.au

The Launceston Football Club, nicknamed The Blues, is an Australian rules football club, located in the West Tamar suburb of Riverside, seven kilometres north of the Launceston CBD and currently play in the NTFA Premier League in Tasmania, Australia.The club was founded in 1875.

== Club origins ==
=== History ===
- Home ground – Windsor Park (1968–present); Windmill Hill Reserve (1875)
- Established – 1875 (merged with Tamar Rowing Club in 1888 and Union Football Club in 1889)
- Playing colours – Navy blue and white
- Emblem – Blues
- Club motto – "Volumus vincere" ("The will to win")
- Club theme song – "Onwards to Victory" (Tune: "Notre Dame March")
- Affiliations – Northern FA (1882–1885), NTFA (1886–1986), NTFL (1987–1993), TFL (1994–1997), NTFL (1998–2008), TSL (2009–2024), NTFA (2025-present)

== Premierships ==
- Northern Tasmanian Football Association (26): 1888, 1889, 1892, 1893, 1894, 1897, 1899, 1900, 1909, 1913, 1920, 1924, 1926, 1929, 1933, 1934, 1935, 1936, 1937, 1938, 1940, 1945, 1951, 1969, 1976, 1985
- Northern Tasmanian Football League (3): 2006, 2007, 2008
- Tasmanian Football League (4): 2011, 2020, 2021, 2022
- Tasmanian State Premierships (5): 1933, 1934, 1935, 1937, 1938

== Individual medal winners ==
Tasman Shields Trophy winners (NTFA)

- 1928 – N. Edwards
- 1929 – J. Milbourne
- 1933 – K. W. "Bill" Cahill
- 1936 – K. W. "Bill" Cahill
- 1939 – Tom Ryan
- 1946 – Lance Crosswell
- 1947 – Lance Crosswell
- 1951 – Darrell Crosswell
- 1959 – Bob Bye
- 1960 – Bob Bye

Hec Smith Memorial Medal winners

- 1968 – Alby Dunn
- 1976 – Paul Ellis
- 1980 – Grant Alford
- 1986 – D. Cook

William Leitch Medal winners

- Nil

Alistair Lynch Medal (Previously the "Tassie Medal") Winners

- 2011 – Tim Bristow

Darrel Baldock Medal winners

- 2003 – Adam Sanders (NTFL)
- 2004 – Anthony Taylor (NTFL)
- 2005 – Brian Finch (NTFL)

== Competition leading goalkickers ==
NTFA leading goalkickers

- 1889 – H. Murray (9)
- 1892 – P. Tabart (9)
- 1893 – R. Lawrence (11)
- 1894 – R. Lawrence (12)
- 1896 – J. Gorman (16)
- 1900 – P. Bird (15)
- 1905 – S. Willett (8)
- 1906 – Viv Valentine (12)
- 1911 – A. Ramsay (6) and R. Thomas (6)
- 1925 – B. Freeland (25)
- 1930 – J. Foley (70)
- 1931 – J. Foley (52)
- 1933 – H. Ranson (62)
- 1935 – A. Waddle (44)
- 1937 – L. Smith (59)
- 1938 – L. Smith (73)
- 1945 – M. Flood (71)
- 1948 – Ross McCrimmon (102)
- 1949 – Ross McCrimmon (83)
- 1950 – Ross McCrimmon (76)
- 1951 – Ross McCrimmon (55)
- 1955 – C. Tabe (67)
- 1967 – Dennis Seen (50)
- 1969 – Tony West (65)
- 1970 – Tony West (50)
- 1976 – Bob Smith (94)
- 1977 – Bob Smith (63)
- 1978 – Ian Donnachy (63)
- 1982 – Ian Donnachy (78)

NTFL leading goalkickers

- 2005 – Adam Derbyshire (93)
- 2006 – Adam Derbyshire (133)
- 2008 – Adam Derbyshire (133)

Tasmanian State League leading goalkickers

- 2010 – Brian Finch (94)
- 2011 – Brian Finch (104)
- 2013 - Sonny Whiting (85)
- 2018 - Mitch Thorp (62)
- 2020 - Dylan Riley (38)

== Senior coaches ==
Coach	Years	Competition	Premierships
Bruce Carruthers	1930	NTFA	
Ron Ward	1931	NTFA	
Bruce Carruthers	1932	NTFA	
Keith Roberts	1933	NTFA	1933
Leo McAuley	1933–1936	NTFA	1933, 1934, 1935, 1936
Jack Beveridge	1937	NTFA	1937
Maurie Johnson	1938	NTFA	1938
Bill Cahill	1939	NTFA	
John Elmer	1940	NTFA	1940
Bill Cahill	1941	NTFA	
Trevor Ranson	1945	NTFA	1945
Alan Crawford	1946	NTFA	
Ken Walker	1947–1949	NTFA	
Noel Atkins	1950–1951	NTFA	1951
Geoffrey Martin	1952	NTFA	
Noel Atkins	1953–1956	NTFA	
Len Toyne	1957–1958	NTFA	
Haydn Bunton, Jr.	1959	NTFA	
M. Kelleher	1960	NTFA	
R. McVilley	1961	NTFA	
Trevor Leo	1962	NTFA	
Graeme Lee	1963–1967	NTFA	
Bob Withers	1968–1969	NTFA	1969
Bruce Armstrong	1970	NTFA	
Bob Withers	1971–1974	NTFA	
K. Roberts	1975	NTFA	
Phil Haughan	1976–1977	NTFA	1976
Grant Allford	1978–1979	NTFA	
Peter Maksimovic	1980	NTFA	
Paul O’Donoghue	1981–1983	NTFA	
Kerry Sanders	1984–1985	NTFA	1985
Paul O’Donoghue	1986	NTFA	
Kerry Sanders	1987	NTFL	
Verdun Howell	1988–1989	NTFL	
F. Woolley	1990	NTFL	
Paul O’Donoghue	1991–1992	NTFL, TFL	
Chris Whitford	1993	TFL	
Peter Chisnall	1994–1995	TFL	
Chris Whitford	1995	TFL	
Michael Lockman	1996–1997	TFL	
Paul Bryce	1998	NTFL	
Brett Hadley	1999	NTFL	
Clayton Sturzaker	2000–2002	NTFL	
Adam Sanders	2003–2009	NTFL, TSL	2006, 2007, 2008
Anthony Taylor	2010–2012	TSL	2011
Brennan Savage	2013	TSL	
Scott Stephens	2014–2015	TSL	
Chris Hills	2016	TSL	
Sam Lonergan	2016–2018	TSL	
Mitch Thorp	2019-	TSL	2020

== Club records ==
Club record score

- 46.18 (294) v Deloraine 10.11 (71) – 1984

Most goals in a match

- A. Derbyshire (18) v Penguin – 2008

Most goals in a season

- A. Derbyshire (140) – 2008

Club record goalkicker (all-time)

- A. Derbyshire (676) from 2000 to 2009; 2012

Club record games holder

- Beau Green (256) from 1999 to 2014

Club record match attendance

- 8,617 – Launceston v Longford at York Park (1957 NTFA Grand Final)

== Notable players ==
There is a list of past and present Launceston players who have played at AFL/VFL:

- Grant Allford (Richmond)
- Roy Apted (St Kilda)
- Bruce Armstrong (1943–2004) (Essendon)
- Tom Bellchambers (Essendon)
- Jack Beveridge (1907–1986) (Collingwood)
- Paul Bryce (North Melbourne, Melbourne and Sydney Swans)
- Bill Cahill (1911–1966) (Essendon)
- George Challis (1891–1916) (Carlton)
- Alan Crawford (1916–1988) (North Melbourne)
- Darren Davies (Footscray and St Kilda)
- Craig Davis (Carlton, North Melbourne, Collingwood and Sydney Swans)
- Harden Dean (1913–1982) (Melbourne)
- John Delanty (St Kilda)
- Alby Dunn (1941–2009) (South Melbourne)
- Robert Dutton (Carlton and Hawthorn)
- Phil Garwood (1939–2011) (Hawthorn)
- Arthur Hinman (1890–1915) (University)
- Lou Holmes (1892–1915) (St Kilda)
- Colin Jackson (1906–1977) (Melbourne)
- Maurie Johnson (1907–2000) (Carlton and South Melbourne)
- Chayce Jones (Adelaide)
- Jake Kolodjashnij (Geelong)
- Kade Kolodjashnij (Gold Coast)
- Harry Lakin (1897–1978) (South Melbourne and St Kilda)
- Graeme Lee (St Kilda)
- Jesse Lonergan (Gold Coast)
- Sam Lonergan (Essendon and Richmond)
- Harry Long (1910–2003) (Melbourne)
- Roy Long (1914–1985) (Hawthorn)
- Harry Luck (1876–1923) (St Kilda)
- Allan Lynch (Fitzroy)
- Stanley McKenzie (1890–1915) (Carlton)
- Tim Mohr (GWS)
- Kevin Northcote (1938–2008) (Hawthorn)
- Alf Oldham (1899–1972) (Carlton)
- Trevor Ranson (1912–1996) (St Kilda)
- Eric Richardson (1891–1969) (St Kilda)
- Jackson Thurlow (Geelong)
- Len Toyne (1922–1998) (Geelong, Fitzroy and Melbourne)
- Viv Valentine (1887–1967) (Carlton)
- Ken Walker (1919–2013) (St Kilda)
- Graham Wise (Melbourne)

- Colby McKercher

== Club song ==
The club song is sung to the tune of Notre Dame Victory March
