= Eric Richardson (Australian footballer) =

Australian rules footballer

Personal information
- Full name: Eric Walter Richardson
- Born: 23 July 1891; Campbell Town, Tasmania
- Died: 15 August 1969 (aged 78); Campbell Town, Tasmania
- Original team: Launceston

Playing career^{1}
Years	Club	Games (Goals)
1915	St Kilda	3 (0)
- ^{1} Playing statistics correct to the end of 1915.

Eric Walter Richardson (23 July 1891 – 15 August 1969) was an Australian rules footballer who played with St Kilda in the Victorian Football League (VFL).
