= Statewide football in Tasmania =

Statewide Australian rules football competition has been played in Tasmania, Australia under the umbrella of the Tasmanian Football League from 1986–1998, Football Tasmania from 1999–2000 until the competition was disbanded in December 2000 and AFL Tasmania from 2009 when a new ten-club competition, this time known as the Tasmanian State League, was formed.

== Background of statewide football ==
Discussions had begun as far back as 1972 between leading coaches, players and officials in Tasmanian football in restructuring the Tasmanian Football League into a statewide competition in an effort to improve playing strength and improve the ability to lure drawcard players to the state after Tasmania's dismal displays at the 1969 and 1972 Australian Football Carnivals had caused the state's football reputation enormous harm.

With crowds continuing to fall since 1968 across the three major regional leagues – TANFL, NTFA and NWFU – and Tasmania's continually disappointing performances at representative level, a prototype statewide competition was organised by the TANFL in 1980.

The Winfield Statewide Cup involved all twenty-one clubs from the three major leagues across Tasmania and was sponsored by tobacco giant Winfield to the tune of $37,500. The tournament ran in a five-round roster with finals between 29 March and 17 May 1980. It was won by the Hobart Football Club, wooden spooners of the previous two seasons in the TANFL and, despite some good football displayed, the football public failed to warm to the concept. The series ran at a financial loss as attendances were disappointing with 75,516 people attending the 58 matches.

The TANFL expressed plans to hold another Winfield Statewide Cup competition in 1981 with prizemoney extended to $50,000 with a view to holding a full TFL Statewide League roster comprising six TANFL clubs and six clubs from the North and North West from the start of the 1982 season.

However, at a meeting of the three main bodies in Launceston on 21 August 1980, the NTFA and NWFU voted against the proposal believing it not to be in the best interests of football in the north of the state.

As a result, the northern and coastal clubs banded together in protest and formed the Greater Northern Football League (GNFL) in 1981 in order to disassociate themselves with the TANFL.

After its formation, GNFL president Brendon Lyons launched a scathing attack on TANFL president John Bennett, accusing him of hatching plans aimed at denigrating Northern football by attempting to take six clubs to the statewide competition and seeking to demote the remaining uninvited clubs to junior status.

The TANFL, as the sport's governing body in Tasmania responded by introducing new qualification entries for players named for state duties, ruling that all players must play in the TANFL to be included in the squad, effectively banning all players from northern leagues from participating in the Tasmanian representative teams. The TANFL had previously stripped both the NTFA and NWFU of its senior status briefly in 1957 after both leagues had banded together to block voting for TANFL initiatives to improve the sport within the State

With Tasmania continuing to underperform at representative level and crowds continuing to fall across the state and a dearth of star players, the TANFL launched an investigation into the decaying state of Tasmanian football.

== Evers Report ==
By 1985 there were twenty-three senior clubs competing across the three major leagues. Between them they attracted around 300,000 spectators to all matches across the season – the TANFL attracted almost this entire figure alone twenty years earlier in 1965 (292,932) but by 1985 the TANFL attendance figure for that season had fallen to 132,461 for all matches.

The income derived from gate revenue was estimated to total approximately $600,000 and this sum was also supplemented by approximately $100,000 provided by four major sponsors and a lesser figure from the Tasmanian state government.

At this time, salaries paid to players and coaches ranged from $10,000 to as high as $100,000 per year.

The TANFL were highly concerned that this state of affairs was totally unsustainable and commissioned a consultant, Nick Evers, to make recommendations for the future of the sport.

Evers had found that a strong decline in attendances in the south and the north (where crowds had fallen to critical levels) was continuing unchecked, and only the NWFU had experienced a small gain in attendances, yet more than half the crowds attending matches in the NWFU were composed of pensioners, children and those who snuck into grounds without paying.

Some of Evers findings included:

- Ground facilities that were considered primitive twenty years previous
- Most well-appointed ground in the state was North Hobart Oval, but its facilities were regarded as "positively Neanderthal"
- Grossly uneven competitions
- Entirely unsuitable attention to junior football by clubs
- Inadequate marketing of the sport
- Amateurish club administration, mostly central administration dominated by club leaders lacking time or skill and being ill-equipped to discharge their mandates
- Numerous examples of gross financial irresponsibility
- Outdated zoning arrangements

In his strongly worded report, Evers concluded that "unless change took place, Tasmanian football was condemned to another generation of mediocrity".

The change recommended was to set up a statewide competition, which had been debated as far back as 1972.

The catalyst for the TANFL to commission Evers to report on the dismal state of the sport in Tasmania came when Tasmania suffered a crushing 96-point defeat to Queensland at Windsor Park in Brisbane on 30 June 1985.

The argument in favour of implementing a statewide competition was that it would raise the profile, and consequently the standard, of football within Tasmania.

Evers recommended a league comprising five southern clubs and five from the north and north-west, however the application of this would have necessitated the omission of one TANFL club (widely tipped to be either New Norfolk or Hobart) or a merger.

The clubs resisted this move but embraced the concept of a statewide competition.

== Birth of statewide football ==
In early 1986 the TANFL went into liquidation and a newly constituted Tasmanian Football League replaced it as the sport's governing body.

The TFL initiated the new competition as the TFL Statewide League with all six former TANFL clubs involved, North Launceston and East Launceston also joined the competition from the NTFA in early 1986.

On 26 May 1986, East Launceston merged with fellow NTFA rival City-South to form the South Launceston Football Club.

However, the new-look competition did not garner the support of the football public at either end of the state at first, with 145,918 spectators attending the 78 matches and 25 matches recording attendances of under 1,000 spectators.

The lowest attendance recorded was 470 at KGV Football Park when New Norfolk hosted South Launceston on 28 June.

In Launceston, the footballing public was still suspicious of the concept – only 15,258 spectators attended the 18 roster matches at an average of 848 spectators per match.

In 1987 the Devonport Football Club joined the competition under a new Blues emblem, along with Burnie Hawks (formerly the Cooee Bulldogs), which created a ten-club competition with all three regions now represented. All clubs were required to field teams in seniors, reserves and under-19s competition from that season.

At first the competition appeared well balanced with three different clubs – Glenorchy, North Hobart and Devonport – winning the league's first three premierships and, importantly, the strong level of competition produced a very high standard of football.

Of even greater importance, the league began to be well supported by players, clubs, sponsors, the general public and the media – which had for many years been unenthusiastic about Tasmanian football – was now giving the TFL Statewide League its full support.

Problems were looming on the horizon, however. In 1986 the VFL/AFL had abandoned its former restrictions upon the number of players each club could draft from outside Victoria and introduced a National Draft.

This was to allow Victorian talent scouts to scour the country for up-and-coming players. Tasmania – a traditional hunting ground for Victorian recruiters – was close by and was seen as a cheap option.

In 1986, seventeen of the sixty-five players drafted in the first National Draft were from Tasmania. By 1990, forty-four of Tasmania's most promising young footballers had been recruited.

The strong contribution that these players may well have made to Tasmanian football was in evidence on 24 June 1990 when Tasmania defeated Victoria by 33-points at North Hobart Oval. It appeared that Tasmanian football was being rapidly stripped of its talent.

== Beginning of the decline ==
This rapid stripping of top talent within the state would cause the second and most dangerous problem for the competition – in an effort to keep promising young players within Tasmania, the clubs were now overspending on player wages. The salary cap for TFL clubs at this time for players and coaches was $200,000 per year and most clubs achieved this figure, but crowd numbers, club memberships and sponsor dollars began to fall due to the crippling effects of the recession.

The TFL administration had also been lax in their financial control of the competition and by 1992 it was servicing a debt of $300,000 and growing as crowd numbers continued to plummet.

Also, in 1992 a number of clubs – North Hobart, Sandy Bay, Clarence and Burnie Hawks – were all in deep financial trouble. In Sandy Bay's case, the Seagulls required an immediate mid-season injection of $70,000 in order to complete the season, while Burnie Hawks had entered into merger discussions with city rival, Burnie Tigers.

An eleventh club, Launceston Football Club were included in the competition in 1994 in an effort to regenerate interest in the North, but the move backfired on the TFL as the club were proven to be completely out of their depth at TFL level both on and off the ground.

The higher standard of football was documented with victories by Tasmania over South Australia, Western Australia and the VFL (formerly the VFA) during the 1990s, but by 1997 the league appeared to be in deep trouble.

The level of interest in the TFL had continued to drop as crowds continued to stay away in droves as the competition had evolved into a two-horse race. The preceding five premierships had been won by just two clubs – Clarence and North Launceston.

Faced with enormous debts and dismal attendances, four clubs were to quit the TFL at the end of the 1997 season. Hobart Football Club (1997 average home attendance of 658), which was in debt almost $460,000, voted to join the Southern Football League, Launceston (1997 average home attendance of 702) and South Launceston (1997 average home attendance of 688) rejoined the NTFL, while Sandy Bay (1997 average home attendance of 844), by then insolvent, were wound up by administrators and closed down.

In 1998 a newly formed club – Southern Districts Cats – were formed as a representative club from the Kingborough region of southern Tasmania with key people from Kingston, Channel and Sandy Bay involved in its setup. The club was to pick up a large number of players from the recently defunct Sandy Bay Football Club, including Troy Clarke, the Seagulls final coach, who took on the senior coaching role with the new club.

Clarence and North Launceston (now renamed the Northern Bombers) continued to dominate the competition. The Bombers went through the 1998 season undefeated and won the premiership with a convincing victory over Clarence in the Grand Final.

== Biggs Report ==
By 1998, the TFL was on the brink of collapse. In a leaked document to the Hobart Mercury newspaper, the following was an official list of club debts at the completion of the 1998 TFL Statewide League season: Burnie Dockers ($735,819), Devonport ($709,067), New Norfolk ($431,858), Glenorchy ($267,897), North Hobart ($232,607), Northern Bombers ($167,570), Clarence ($153,441), Southern Districts ($80,000). With the debt level continuing to rise, the League were continuing to raise the issue of cutbacks of participating clubs and changes to a possible summer start in a bid to lift the flagging image of the TFL which was now financially crippled and struggling to find strong corporate support because the state was also in deep financial trouble.

The Australian Football League, so concerned with the state of Tasmanian football, conducted a thorough review of Tasmanian football, commonly referred to as the Biggs Report. Among the findings by Ed Biggs was that the lack of unity that had existed in Tasmanian football prior to the Evers Report and the founding of the TFL Statewide League continued to exist.

In northern Tasmania, all football bodies with the exception of the current-day NTFA (formerly the TAFL – Northern Division and no relation to the pre-1987 NTFA) were affiliated to the NTFL. In southern Tasmania it was found that most associations were affiliated to the TFL but the Southern Football League – the major southern competition – was not. The most significant recommendation of the Biggs Report was that a new independent state body should be formed.

This recommendation was roundly accepted and a new body known as Football Tasmania was founded in December 1998. The TFL – by now staggering under crushing debts – was liquidated in February 1999. Football Tasmania began its life with a noose around its neck almost immediately by having to run the statewide league, now known as the Tasmanian State Football League (TSFL).

On 31 May 1999 the Southern Cats were wound up at a meeting with Football Tasmania with debts of $100,000, leaving the competition with only seven clubs to finish out the remainder of the season.

From 2000, Football Tasmania had set up a brand new statewide competition – this one known as the SWL – which comprised six clubs, each of them based in one of the state's six cities. Those were Hobart Demons (formerly North Hobart), Clarence, Glenorchy, Northern Bombers (formerly North Launceston), Burnie Dockers and Devonport Power.

By December 2000, the Burnie Dockers voted to leave the competition and both Northern Bombers and Devonport similarly followed suit a short time later, leaving only the three Southern clubs to remain in the competition.

With the SWL competition being wound up and closing down in December 2000, the three orphaned clubs (Clarence, Glenorchy and Hobart Demons) were finally accepted into the SFL after a protracted battle in early 2001.

== Participating clubs: 1986–2000 ==
- 1987–1994 – Burnie Hawks Football Club
- 1995–2000 – Burnie Dockers Football Club
- 1986–2000 – Clarence District Football Club
- 1987–1995 – Devonport Blues Football Club
- 1996–2000 – Devonport Power Football Club
- 1986–1986 – East Launceston Football Club
- 1986–1997 – South Launceston Football Club
- 1986–2000 – Glenorchy District Football Club
- 1986–1997 – Hobart Football Club
- 1994–1997 – Launceston Football Club
- 1986–1998 – New Norfolk District Football Club
- 1999–1999 – Derwent Eagles Football Club
- 1986–1998 – North Hobart Football Club
- 1999–2000 – Hobart Demons Football Club
- 1986–1997 – North Launceston Football Club
- 1998–2000 – Northern Bombers Football Club
- 1986–1997 – Sandy Bay Football Club
- 1998–1999 – Southern Districts Football Club

== TFL Statewide, TSFL and SWL Grand Finals: 1986–2000 ==
- 1986 – Glenorchy 14.20 (104) v Sandy Bay 9.18 (72) – Att: 16,111 at North Hobart Oval
- 1987 – North Hobart 23.20 (158) v Glenorchy 16.10 (106) – Att: 17,094 at North Hobart Oval
- 1988 – Devonport 15.7 (97) v Glenorchy 8.6 (54) – Att: 17,878 at North Hobart Oval
- 1989 – North Hobart 18.22 (130) v Hobart 16.4 (100) – Att: 16,528 at North Hobart Oval
- 1990 – Hobart 19.16 (130) v North Launceston 10.12 (72) – Att: 15,633 at North Hobart Oval
- 1991 – North Hobart 12.14 (86) v North Launceston 8.12 (60) – Att: 13,112 at North Hobart Oval
- 1992 – North Hobart 16.12 (108) v Hobart 10.13 (73) – Att: 11,967 at North Hobart Oval
- 1993 – Clarence 19.12 (126) v North Launceston 17.15 (117) – Att: 13,102 at North Hobart Oval
- 1994 – Clarence 13.13 (91) v New Norfolk 8.5 (53) – Att: 14,230 at North Hobart Oval
- 1995 – North Launceston 9.11 (65) v Clarence 7.13 (55) – Att: 9,448 at North Hobart Oval
- 1996 – Clarence 14.17 (101) v Burnie Dockers 10.14 (74) – Att: 12,352 at North Hobart Oval
- 1997 – Clarence 20.9 (129) v Burnie Dockers 18.14 (122) – Att: 9,053 at North Hobart Oval
- 1998 – Northern Bombers 14.16 (100) v Clarence 6.15 (51) – Att: 9,638 at North Hobart Oval
- 1999 – Glenorchy 15.9 (99) v Northern Bombers 7.11 (53) – Att: 8,053 at North Hobart Oval
- 2000 – Clarence 15.15 (105) v Northern Bombers 8.8 (56) – Att: 6,124 at York Park

== TFL Statewide, TSFL and SWL Reserves Grand Finals: 1986–2000 ==
- 1986 – Glenorchy 17.18 (120) v North Hobart 10.9 (69) – North Hobart Oval *
- 1987 – Sandy Bay 19.14 (128) v Glenorchy 15.15 (105) – North Hobart Oval
- 1988 – Glenorchy 19.13 (127) v North Hobart 14.18 (102) – North Hobart Oval
- 1989 – Sandy Bay 10.14 (74) v Devonport 8.8 (56) – North Hobart Oval
- 1990 – Burnie Hawks 13.11 (89) v Glenorchy 9.9 (63) – North Hobart Oval
- 1991 – North Launceston 14.16 (100) v Glenorchy 12.11 (83) – North Hobart Oval
- 1992 – Glenorchy 11.14 (80) v North Hobart 9.11 (65) – North Hobart Oval
- 1993 – Glenorchy 16.11 (107) v Clarence 10.20 (80) – North Hobart Oval
- 1994 – Sandy Bay 12.21 (93) v North Hobart 10.5 (65) – North Hobart Oval
- 1995 – North Hobart 22.7 (139) v New Norfolk 12.9 (81) – North Hobart Oval
- 1996 – Burnie Dockers 12.9 (81) v Clarence 9.20 (74) – North Hobart Oval
- 1997 – North Launceston 10.17 (77) v Glenorchy 10.9 (69) – North Hobart Oval
- 1998 – Burnie Dockers 11.19 (85) v Northern Bombers 10.9 (69) – North Hobart Oval
- 1999 – Clarence 14.15 (99) v Northern Bombers 8.9 (57) – North Hobart Oval
- 2000 – Clarence 9.13 (67) v Northern Bombers 8.14 (62) – York Park *

Note: The 1986 season was a Southern-based competition only while the 2000 season was run as an Under-21s competition.

== TFL Statewide, TSFL and SWL under-19s Grand Finals: 1986–2000 ==
- 1986 – Glenorchy 17.17 (119) v Clarence 10.8 (68) – North Hobart Oval *
- 1987 – New Norfolk 25.15 (165) v North Hobart 9.8 (62) – North Hobart Oval
- 1988 – New Norfolk 10.9 (69) v North Launceston 8.18 (66) – North Hobart Oval
- 1989 – Sandy Bay 10.8 (68) v South Launceston 7.8 (50) – North Hobart Oval
- 1990 – North Launceston 10.13 (73) v Glenorchy 10.4 (64) – North Hobart Oval
- 1991 – Glenorchy 17.15 (117) v North Launceston 8.8 (56) – North Hobart Oval
- 1992 – Glenorchy 10.9 (69) v North Launceston 8.9 (57) – North Hobart Oval
- 1993 – North Hobart 16.9 (105) v Clarence 7.15 (57) – North Hobart Oval
- 1994 – New Norfolk 11.15 (81) v Burnie Hawks 9.6 (60) – North Hobart Oval
- 1995 – North Hobart 19.10 (124) v Glenorchy 9.9 (63) – North Hobart Oval
- 1996 – Devonport 17.18 (120) v North Hobart 9.10 (64) – North Hobart Oval
- 1997 – Devonport 9.16 (70) v Glenorchy 6.11 (47) – North Hobart Oval
- 1998 – Clarence 10.13 (73) v Devonport 5.6 (36) – North Hobart Oval
- 1999 – Clarence 13.10 (88) v Glenorchy 8.8 (56) – North Hobart Oval
- 2000 – Glenorchy (A) 13.9 (87) v Hobart Demons (B) 4.3 (27) – York Park *

Notes: The 1986 season was a Southern-based competition only while the 2000 season was run as an Under-18's competition.

== Statewide football medal winners ==
=== William Leitch Medal winners: 1986–2000 ===
(Best and fairest player in TFL Statewide, TSFL and SWL senior football)

- 1986 – Andy Bennett (Sandy Bay)
- 1987 – David Code (Devonport)
- 1988 – Adrian Fletcher (Glenorchy) & Michael Seddon (Sandy Bay)
- 1989 – Scott Wade (Clarence)
- 1990 – Ricky Hanlon (New Norfolk)
- 1991 – Gary Williamson (Clarence)
- 1992 – Jason Gibson (North Launceston)
- 1993 – Daryn Perry (North Hobart) & Rene Peters (New Norfolk)
- 1994 – Michael Maple (North Hobart)
- 1995 – Danny Noonan (Clarence) & Geoff Wiggins (Sandy Bay)
- 1996 – Danny Noonan (Clarence)
- 1997 – Fabian Carelli (Devonport)
- 1998 – Wayne Weidemann (Devonport)
- 1999 – Ben Atkin (Glenorchy), Matthew Jones (Clarence) & Darren Trevena (Northern Bombers)
- 2000 – Nathan Howard (Northern Bombers)

=== Darrel Baldock Medal winners: 1989–2000 ===
(Best player in TFL Statewide, TSFL and SWL Grand Final)

- 1989 – Jim Mathewson (North Hobart)
- 1990 – Michael Winter (Hobart)
- 1991 – Darren Mathewson (North Hobart)
- 1992 – Daryn Perry (North Hobart)
- 1993 – Darren Winter (Clarence)
- 1994 – Jason Wilton (New Norfolk)
- 1995 – Andrew McLean (North Launceston)
- 1996 – Daniel Hulm (Clarence)
- 1997 – Danny Noonan (Clarence)
- 1998 – Brendon Bolton (Northern Bombers)
- 1999 – Ben Careless (Glenorchy)
- 2000 – Scott Allen (Clarence)

=== George Watt Medal winners: 1986–2000 ===
(Best and fairest player in TFL Statewide, TSFL and SWL reserves football)

- 1986 – Robbie Crane (New Norfolk)
- 1987 – Craig Randall (Sandy Bay), Mark Radford (Burnie Hawks) & Matthew Honner (Glenorchy)
- 1988 – Steven Hay (Glenorchy)
- 1989 – Jeffrey Wood (Devonport)
- 1990 – Jeffrey Wood (Devonport)
- 1991 – Brendan Skelly (New Norfolk)
- 1992 – John Rainbird (New Norfolk)
- 1993 – Ricky Darley (North Hobart)
- 1994 – Stephen Jackson (Burnie Hawks)
- 1995 – Jeremy Busch (North Hobart)
- 1996 – Brent Thomas (Launceston)
- 1997 – Ted Davis (North Launceston) & Brett Smith (Devonport)
- 1998 – Nick Barnes (Burnie Dockers)
- 1999 – Stuart Beechey (Clarence)
- 2000 – Justin Cotton (Northern Bombers) & Heath Fox (Northern Bombers)

=== Major V. A. Geard Medal winners: 1986–2000 ===
(Best and fairest Player in TFL Statewide, TSFL and SWL under-19s football)

- 1986 – Jason Taylor (New Norfolk)
- 1987 – Darren Clifford (North Launceston)
- 1988 – Steven Byers (New Norfolk)
- 1989 – Damien Goss (Hobart)
- 1990 – Drew Hall (Sandy Bay)
- 1991 – Justin Goc (Hobart)
- 1992 – Alan Bond (Hobart)
- 1993 – Craig Carr (Glenorchy)
- 1994 – Aaron Priest (Clarence) & Jonathon Alexander (South Launceston)
- 1995 – Ricky Braslin (New Norfolk)
- 1996 – Brent Dickson (Hobart)
- 1997 – David Kamaric (Glenorchy)
- 1998 – Chris Gracogna (Northern Bombers)
- 1999 – Jason Rigby (Hobart Demons)
- 2000 – Jamie Walker (Glenorchy)

=== TFL Statewide League, TSFL and SWL leading goalkicker: 1986–2000 ===
- 1986 – Wayne Fox (Hobart) – 105
- 1987 – Paul Dac (New Norfolk) – 80, Wayne Fox (Hobart) – 80 & Steve McQueen (North Hobart) – 80
- 1988 – Chris Reynolds (Devonport) – 111
- 1989 – Shane Fell (Glenorchy) – 114
- 1990 – Paul Dac (New Norfolk) – 103
- 1991 – Paul Dac (New Norfolk) – 133
- 1992 – Byron Howard (North Hobart) – 92
- 1993 – Keith Robinson (Hobart) – 76
- 1994 – Paul Dac (Clarence) – 94
- 1995 – Byron Howard (North Hobart) – 104
- 1996 – Justin Plapp (Burnie Dockers) – 98
- 1997 – Byron Howard (North Hobart) – 70
- 1998 – Ken Rainsford (Devonport) – 94
- 1999 – Adam Aherne (Northern Bombers) – 68
- 2000 – Scott Allen (Clarence) – 80

== Attendance records ==
=== TFL Statewide League, TSFL and SWL attendances: 1986–2000 ===
Season	Roster	Matches	Average	Finals	Matches	Average	Aggregate	Matches	Average
1986	104,889	72	1,456	41,029	6	6,838	145,918	78	1,870
1987	126,548	90	1,406	42,351	6	7,058	168,899	96	1,759
1988	152,669	90	1,696	40,278	6	6,713	192,947	96	2,009
1989	148,042	90	1,644	44,901	6	7,483	192,943	96	2,009
1990	164,994	105	1,571	38,572	6	6,428	203,566	111	1,833
1991	144,491	105	1,376	32,938	6	5,489	177,429	111	1,598
1992	110,788	90	1,231	24,608	6	4,101	135,396	96	1,410
1993	110,490	90	1,227	30,561	6	5,093	141,051	96	1,469
1994	112,860	99	1,140	31,675	6	5,279	144,535	105	1,376
1995	116,443	99	1,176	27,384	6	4,639	143,827	105	1,369
1996	128,277	110	1,166	26,886	6	4,486	155,163	116	1,337
1997	108,463	99	1,095	19,720	6	3,286	128,183	105	1,220
1998	94,336	72	1,310	25,327	6	4,221	119,663	78	1,534
1999	68,346	62	1,102	18,001	6	3,000	86,347	68	1,269
2000	60,632	51	1,188	12,410	4	3,102	73,042	55	1,328
Total	1,752,268	1324	1,319	456,641	88	5,189	2,208,909	1,412	1,564

=== Record roster match attendance: TFL Statewide League, TSFL and SWL ===
- 5,625 – Northern Bombers v Clarence – 22 July 2000 at York Park (night)
- 5,590 – Burnie Dockers v Devonport – 20 July 1997 at West Park Oval
- 5,423 – Burnie Hawks v Devonport – 23 April 1988 at West Park Oval
- 5,078 – Burnie Dockers v Devonport – 14 July 1996 at West Park Oval
- 5,075 – Clarence v North Hobart – 13 June 1987 at Bellerive Oval

=== Top five finals match attendances: TFL Statewide League, TSFL and SWL ===
- 17,878 – Devonport v Glenorchy – 1988 TFL Grand Final at North Hobart Oval
- 17,094 – North Hobart v Glenorchy – 1987 TFL Grand Final at North Hobart Oval
- 16,528 – North Hobart v Hobart – 1989 TFL Grand Final at North Hobart Oval
- 16,111 – Glenorchy v Sandy Bay – 1986 TFL Grand Final at North Hobart Oval
- 15,633 – Hobart v North Launceston – 1990 TFL Grand Final at North Hobart Oval

== Scoring records ==
=== Record score: TFL Statewide League, TSFL and SWL ===
- 47.14 (296) – North Launceston v South Launceston 10.8 (68) – 30 July 1995 at York Park
- 37.24 (246) – North Hobart v South Launceston 2.5 (17) – 3 May 1991 at North Hobart Oval
- 38.16 (244) – Clarence v Devonport Power 4.4 (28) – 17 August 1999 at Bellerive Oval
- 38.15 (243) – North Hobart v New Norfolk 11.11 (77) – 5 August 1989 at Boyer Oval
- 35.28 (238) – Burnie Dockers v Hobart 0.1 (1) – 8 June 1997 at North Hobart Oval

=== Record losing score: TFL Statewide League, TSFL and SWL ===
- 21.14 (140) – New Norfolk v North Hobart 24.19 (163) – 13 May 1989 at North Hobart Oval
- 21.13 (139) – North Launceston v Hobart 22.9 (141) – 5 August 1989 at North Hobart Oval
- 21.11 (137) – Devonport v New Norfolk 20.17 (137) – 12 August 1989 at Devonport Oval
- 20.17 (137) – Sandy Bay v Glenorchy 22.18 (150) – 3 May 1986 at Queenborough Oval
- 20.17 (137) – New Norfolk v Devonport 21.11 (137) – 12 August 1989 at Devonport Oval
- 21.10 (136) – Burnie Hawks v North Hobart 28.13 (181) – 8 July 1989 at North Hobart Oval

=== Record quarter score: TFL Statewide League, TSFL and SWL ===
- 17.5 (107) – North Launceston v South Launceston 0.1 (1) – (4th Quarter) – 30 July 1995 at York Park
- 14.7 (91) – Sandy Bay v North Launceston 3.0 (18) – (3rd Quarter) – 6 April 1986 at York Park
- 15.0 (90) – North Launceston v South Launceston 3.1 (19) – (2nd Quarter) – 30 July 1995 at York Park
- 14.4 (88) – Devonport v New Norfolk 0.2 (2) – (2nd Quarter) – 16 April 1988 at Devonport Oval
- 13.3 (81) – Hobart v North Launceston 3.1 (19) – (4th Quarter) – 19 July 1986 at York Park

=== Record lowest score: TFL Statewide League, TSFL and SWL ===
- 0.1 (1) – Hobart v Burnie Dockers 35.28 (238) – 8 June 1997 at North Hobart Oval.
- 0.5 (5) – Hobart v Burnie Dockers 14.18 (102) – 8 August 1996 at West Park Oval.
- 1.3 (9) – North Hobart v New Norfolk 14.17 (101) – 22 August 1996 at Boyer Oval
- 1.4 (10) – Devonport v Burnie 14.20 (104) – 1 April 2000 at West Park Oval
- 2.2 (14) – Hobart v Glenorchy 20.13 (133) – 8 August 1987 at KGV Football Park

=== Record winning margin: TFL Statewide League, TSFL and SWL ===
- 237 points – Burnie Dockers 35.28 (238) v Hobart 0.1 (1) – 8 June 1997 at North Hobart Oval
- 229 points – North Hobart 37.24 (246) v South Launceston 2.5 (17) – 18 May 1991 at North Hobart Oval
- 228 points – North Launceston 47.14 (296) v South Launceston 10.8 (68) – 30 July 1995 at York Park
- 216 points – Clarence 38.16 (244) v Devonport 4.4 (28) – 14 August 1999 at Bellerive Oval
- 193 points – Clarence 35.17 (227) v Hobart 5.4 (34) – 1 September 1996 at North Hobart Oval

=== Record individual goalkicker (career): TFL Statewide League, TSFL and SWL ===
- 582 – Byron Howard Jnr (North Hobart) from 1987–1997.
- 526 – Paul Dac (New Norfolk & Clarence) from 1986–1995.
- 515 – Wayne Fox – (Hobart, South Launceston & Sandy Bay) from 1986–1991.

=== Record individual goalkicker (season): TFL Statewide League, TSFL and SWL ===
- 133 – Paul Dac (New Norfolk) – 1991
- 114 – Shane Fell (Glenorchy) – 1989
- 111 – Chris Reynolds (Devonport) – 1988
- 110 – Wayne Fox (Hobart) – 1988
- 106 – Byron Howard Jnr (North Hobart) – 1991

=== Record individual Goalkicker (match): TFL Statewide League, TSFL and SWL ===
- 17.9 – Simon Byrne (Glenorchy) v Sth Launceston – 5 August 1995 at Youngtown Memorial Ground
- 16.3 – Ken Rainsford (Launceston) v Hobart – 3 May 1997 at North Hobart Oval
- 15.6 – Mark Williams (Devonport) v South Launceston – 18 August 1990 at Devonport Oval
- 14.5 – Paul Dac (New Norfolk) v North Launceston – 15 August 1987 at Boyer Oval

=== Record individual goalkicker (quarter): TFL Statewide League, TSFL and SWL ===
- 7 – Guy Grey (Burnie Hawks) v South Launceston (4th Quarter) – 11 May 1991 at York Park
- 6 – Wayne Fox (Hobart) v New Norfolk (3rd Quarter) – 2 April 1988 at North Hobart Oval
- 6 – Paul Dac (New Norfolk) v North Hobart (4th Quarter) – 18 April 1992 at Boyer Oval

=== Most suspended player: TFL Statewide League, TSFL and SWL ===
- 37 matches – Steven Rattray (North Hobart, Hobart & Sandy Bay) from 1988–1996.
- 33 matches – Dale Whish-Wilson (Burnie Hawks & Burnie Dockers) from 1987–1997.

== Match all-time records ==
=== TFL Statewide, TSFL and SWL club match record: 1986–2000 ===
Team	Roster	Won	Lost	Draw	Finals	Won	Lost	Draw	Total	Won	Lost	Draw	Seasons	Titles
Clarence	(277)	205	69	3	(36)	21	15	0	(313)	226	84	3	(15)	5
Nth Launceston/Nth Bombers	(277)	185	90	2	(26)	12	14	0	(303)	197	104	2	(15)	2
Glenorchy	(277)	141	135	1	(22)	14	8	0	(299)	155	143	1	(15)	2
North Hobart/Hobart Demons	(277)	143	134	0	(21)	14	7	0	(298)	157	141	0	(15)	4
Devonport	(259)	120	135	4	(13)	5	8	0	(272)	125	143	4	(14)	1
New Norfolk/Derwent Eagles	(260)	111	145	4	(10)	3	7	0	(270)	114	152	4	(14)	0
Hobart	(224)	96	126	2	(16)	8	8	0	(240)	104	134	2	(12)	1
Sandy Bay	(224)	95	127	2	(9)	3	6	0	(233)	98	133	2	(12)	0
South Launceston	(217)	51	164	2	(0)	0	0	0	(217)	51	164	2	(12)	0
Burnie Hawks	(150)	74	74	2	(8)	3	5	0	(158)	77	79	2	(8)	0
Burnie Dockers	(109)	76	33	0	(13)	5	8	0	(122)	81	41	0	(6)	0
Launceston	(74)	15	59	0	(0)	0	0	0	(74)	15	59	0	(4)	0
Southern Cats	(26)	8	18	0	(1)	0	1	0	(27)	8	19	0	(1¼)	0
East Launceston	(7)	2	5	0	(0)	0	0	0	(7)	2	5	0	(¼)	0

== Tasmanian State League ==
After a hiatus of eight years, AFL Tasmania announced plans for a return of the statewide league in 2009. The concept attracted widespread public and media debate on the return of a statewide competition, with many in the football world hesitant over such a move due to the perilous financial position most of the participating clubs were left in after the previous competition was disbanded in 2000. Many believed the push for a return of the league was a direct result of the media and the Tasmanian State Government's strong campaign in getting a Tasmanian team admitted into the AFL.

Under the AFL Tasmania plan, ten clubs were invited to join the competition: in the south, Clarence, Glenorchy, Hobart and North Hobart, along with former amateur club Lauderdale. North Launceston, South Launceston and Launceston from the north and Devonport and Burnie Dockers from the north west coast.

The response from many clubs was initially lukewarm at best with many concerned at the lack of detail in the AFL Tasmania plan and the rushed decision-making process of the move.

Ulverstone Football Club from the north west coast bowed to pressure from its playing list and some factional groups within the club to put in a submission to join the TFL in 2009. Despite a membership vote narrowly ending in favour of joining, the Robins had missed the AFL Tasmania enforced deadline and were initially to be included in the 2010 TSL roster, however the remaining clubs (most notably its closest and most bitter rival Devonport) exerted considerable pressure upon the League not to alter the current makeup of teams for a period of ten years, therefore Ulverstone were excluded from joining.

SFL Premier League club Kingborough also lobbied AFL Tasmania to be included in the competition, but their case for inclusion was dismissed by the game's governing body due to their inadequate facilities and poor standard Kingston Beach Oval headquarters.

Former TFL club New Norfolk (1947–1999) was not invited to join the league because of their poor financial position.

Also, as a result of the new competition getting off the ground, the Tasmanian Devils were disbanded.

On 8 December 2008, the Wrest Point Tasmanian State League was launched at Wrest Point Casino in Hobart. On 4 April 2009, the opening match of the reformed competition took place at KGV Football Park between the reigning premiers of the SFL Premier League, Glenorchy and reigning NTFL premier Launceston and resulted in a 21-point triumph to the Blues. The inaugural Grand Final was held at Bellerive Oval on 19 September between old rivals Glenorchy and Clarence resulting in a thrilling six-point victory to the Roos in front of 7,534 fans.

The 2010 season started brightly with over 12,000 attending the first round of matches but soon after there was a great deal of off-field controversy with former Tasmanian Premier Paul Lennon originally accepting an unpaid role acting as a mediator between the clubs and AFL Tasmania as the relationship between the clubs and the governing body had become further strained. However, after only two weeks of the season, three clubs (Clarence, North Launceston and North Hobart) had decided to do their own bidding and Lennon walked away from the position.

There were further controversies, namely AFL Tasmania's decision to withdraw support for the reserve grade competition after the Burnie Dockers announced only days before the start of the season that they would not be fielding a reserve grade side. Two other clubs (Hobart and Launceston) also struggled to field a reserves team throughout the season, and as a result the competition was run by the clubs themselves for the remainder of the season. It was axed at season's end.

A finals set-up that included an extra week was roundly criticised by football pundits across the state and it failed to garner great enthusiasm among the footballing public as small crowds attended, with AFL Tasmania later admitting that they would be returning to a tradition final five setup in 2011.

Clarence totally dominated the season, losing just one match during the roster rounds (away to Launceston with five top players out of the team) and, after a dominant finals series in which they thrashed Launceston twice to head into a Grand Final, Devonport caused a shock to sneak into the decider by virtue of running all over a disappointing Launceston at Aurora Stadium in the Preliminary Final. The Grand Final on 18 September pitted Clarence as raging favourites over Devonport, who had a dreadful record at Bellerive Oval (1–17–1) and last won there in 1988. Devonport, playing in its first Grand Final at state level since 1988, proved no match for a rampaging Roo outfit who eventually pulled away to a 57-point triumph and recorded its 25th consecutive win at the ground in the process.

The 2011 season began amid much hype and fanfare with the arrival of former Brisbane Lions and Western Bulldogs player, Jason Akermanis to Glenorchy. The opening match of the season between the Magpies and their hated rivals Clarence drew an all-time statewide football record roster match attendance of 8,480 to KGV Football Park (it was also the fourth highest roster match attendance ever recorded in Tasmanian football history and was the highest non-finals domestic club match attendance in the state since 1968), Glenorchy went on to defeat the Roos convincingly and would become the early season premiership favourites along with Launceston as, in the early part of the season, it appeared that reigning premier Clarence had slipped well below their 2010 form.

As the season progressed, Launceston swept all before them during the roster rounds to go through the season undefeated as Clarence regained form and later Burnie challenged the Blues for the title. Glenorchy's season went into freefall in mid-season and after two horror losses in a row, coach Byron Howard Jnr was sacked and replaced by former coach Kim Excell for the remainder of the season where they were to defeat an inconsistent North Hobart in the elimination final and bow out to Clarence in the first semi final after a heavy defeat.

Burnie were to strike a rich vein of form in the finals series disposing of highly fancied Clarence at Bellerive in the qualifying final and inflicting Launceston's only defeat of the season in the second semi final at Aurora Stadium to advance to the Grand Final. Launceston, on the back of full-forward Brian Finch's 100 goals during the season were desperate to shake off the "chokers" tag and, after a fast start, were able to dispose of reigning premier Clarence by 35 points under lights at Aurora Stadium in the preliminary final.

On 24 September, the Grand Final at Launceston's Aurora Stadium pitted two clubs from the northern half of the state for the first time in the history of statewide football. Football pundits across the state were divided in their views on who would take the title, but the Blues gradually wore down the Dockers and pulled away late in the third quarter and continued on with the job in the final quarter to take their first premiership title in statewide football and their first premiership at state level since their 1938 State Premiership title.

During the 2013 season, the South Launceston Football Club decided that it would not pursue a new TSL licence at the end of the season, and arranged to move into the NTFA in 2014; despite this, the club went on to win the 2013 premiership, meaning that there was no defending premier in 2014. The club was replaced by the Prospect State Football Club, which competes under the formal club name of Western Storm Football Club. At the same time, the North Hobart Football Club was forced to disband as a team by AFL Tasmania in favour of the newly established Hobart City Football Club, whilst the Hobart Tigers left for the Southern Football League. These movements were forced upon the league to make space for a new AFL Tasmania backed TSL club, the Kingborough Tigers Football Club.

Prior to 2016, the Western Storm was rebranded as the Prospect Hawks; but it was unable to field a senior team in 2016, managing only to field an uncompetitive team in the reserves, before being expelled from the league at the end of the 2016 season.

== Participating clubs ==
Current clubs

- Burnie Dockers Football Club
- Clarence District Football Club
- Devonport Football Club
- Glenorchy District Football Club
- Hobart City Football Club
- Kingborough Football Club
- Lauderdale Football Club
- Launceston Football Club
- North Launceston Football Club

Former clubs

- Hobart Football Club
- South Launceston Football Club
- North Hobart Football Club
- Western Storm Football Club

== TSL club win–loss record: 2009–2019 ==
Team	Roster	Won	Lost	Draw	Finals	Won	Lost	Draw	Total	Won	Lost	Draw
Clarence	(162)	109	53	0	(19)	10	9	0	(181)	119	62	0
Glenorchy	(162)	109	53	0	(14)	5	9	0	(176)	114	62	0
Burnie	(162)	104	57	1	(17)	8	9	0	(179)	112	66	1
North Launceston	(162)	94	68	0	(13)	10	3	0	(175)	104	71	0
Launceston	(162)	89	73	0	(18)	8	10	0	(180)	97	83	0
Lauderdale	(162)	89	71	2	(13)	6	7	0	(175)	95	78	2
Devonport	(162)	52	110	0	(9)	4	5	0	(171)	56	115	0
North Hobart	(90)	43	47	0	(5)	2	3	0	(95)	45	50	0
Hobart City	(72)	31	40	1	(0)	0	0	0	(72)	31	40	1
South Launceston	(90)	29	61	0	(2)	2	0	0	(92)	31	61	0
Western Storm	(36)	15	21	0	(4)	2	2	0	(40)	17	23	0
Hobart	(90)	16	74	0	(0)	0	0	0	(90)	16	74	0
Kingborough	(72)	10	62	0	(0)	0	0	0	(72)	10	62	0

=== TSL Grand Finals: 2009–present ===
- 2009 – Clarence 15.11 (101) d Glenorchy 14.11 (95) – Att: 7,534 at Bellerive Oval
- 2010 – Clarence 15.13 (103) d Devonport 6.10 (46) – Att: 6,123 at Bellerive Oval
- 2011 – Launceston 12.14 (86) d Burnie Dockers 6.6 (42) – Att: 6,658 at York Park
- 2012 – Burnie 16.14 (110) d Launceston 9.8 (62) – Att: 5,569 at York Park
- 2013 – South Launceston 10.14 (74) d Burnie Dockers 9.11 (65) – Att: 5,904 at York Park
- 2014 – North Launceston 18.13 (121) d Western Storm 10.2 (62) – Att: 5,842 at York Park
- 2015 – North Launceston 13.13 (91) d Glenorchy 11.13 (79) – Att: 5,978 at Bellerive Oval
- 2016 – Glenorchy 9.6 (60) d North Launceston 5.10 (40) – Att: 6,128 at York Park
- 2017 – North Launceston 21.22 (148) d Lauderdale 9.7 (61) – Att: 6,108 at York Park
- 2018 – North Launceston 7.21 (63) d Lauderdale 4.9 (33) – Att: 4,423 at York Park
- 2019 – North Launceston 13.10 (88) d Lauderdale 9.5 (59) – Att: 4,692 at Bellerive Oval
- 2020 – Launceston 8.4 (52) d North Launceston 5.9 (39) – Att: 3,000 at York Park
- 2021 – Launceston 12.5 (77) d North Launceston 6.7 (43) – Att: N/A at York Park

=== TSL Reserves Grand Finals: 2009–2010 ===
- 2009 – Launceston 12.12 (84) v Glenorchy 4.13 (37) – Bellerive Oval
- 2010 – Clarence 8.8 (56) v North Hobart 7.11 (53) – Bellerive Oval

(Note): Due to poor crowds and club disinterest, AFL Tasmania disaffiliated the Reserve Grade competition two rounds into the 2010 season, and it was shut down at season's end.

=== TSL Colts/Development League Grand Finals: 2009–present ===
- 2009 – Lauderdale 10.11 (71) d Clarence 4.3 (27) – Bellerive Oval
- 2010 – North Launceston 10.11 (71) d Clarence 7.8 (50) – Bellerive Oval
- 2011 – Launceston 14.12 (96) d Clarence 10.10 (70) – York Park
- 2012 – Nth Launceston 11.9 (75) d Launceston 10.13 (73) – York Park
- 2013 – Clarence 11.6 (72) d Lauderdale 9.12 (66) – York Park
- 2014 – Lauderdale 11.14 (80) d Clarence 9.8 (62) – York Park
- 2015 – Clarence 15.17 (107) d Glenorchy 11.6 (72) – Bellerive Oval
- 2016 – Clarence 14.8 (92) d Glenorchy 9.13 (67) – York Park
- 2017 – Clarence 11.7 (73) d Launceston 8.7 (55) - York Park
- 2018 – Launceston 7.7 (49) d North Launceston 2.3 (15) - York Park
- 2019 – North Launceston 9.8 (62) d Kingborough 8.8 (56) - Bellerive Oval
- 2020 – - York Park
- 2021 – Clarence 12.2 (74) d Launceston 8.12 (60) - York Park

== Medal winners ==
=== Alastair Lynch Medal winners ===
(Best and fairest player in TSL senior football).

- 2009 – Kurt Heazlewood (Devonport)
- 2010 – Brett Geappen (Clarence)
- 2011 – Tim Bristow (Launceston)
- 2012 – Jaye Bowden (Glenorchy)
- 2013 – Mitch Thorp (South Launceston)
- 2014 – Daniel Roozendaal (North Launceston)
- 2015 – Jaye Bowden (Glenorchy)
- 2016 – Jaye Bowden (Glenorchy)
- 2017 – Bradley Cox-Goodyer (North Launceston)
- 2018 – Josh Ponting (North Launceston)

=== Eade Medal winners ===
(Best and fairest player in TSL reserves football in 2009 and TSL colts from 2010).

- 2009 – James Lovell (Burnie Dockers) (Reserves)
- 2010 – Patrick Riley – (North Hobart) (Colts)
- 2011 – Tom Arnold – (North Hobart) (Colts)
- 2012 – Joe Edwards (Lauderdale) (Colts)
- 2013 – Michael Blackburn (Clarence) Haydn Smith (Lauderdale) (Reserves)
- 2014 – Mitchell Swan (Clarence) (Development League)
- 2015 – Brendan Hay (Clarence) (Development League)
- 2016 – Paul Hudson (Lauderdale) (Development League)
- 2017 – Cameron Downie (Launceston) (Development League)
- 2018 – Anthony Liberatore (Launceston) (Development League)

=== Matthew Richardson Medal winners ===
(Best rookie player in TSL senior football).

- 2010 – Trent Standen (Clarence)
- 2011 – Kaine Waller (Lauderdale)
- 2012 – Aaron McNab (Devonport)
- 2013 – Thane Bardenhagen (South Launceston)
- 2014 – Ben Halton (Lauderdale)
- 2015 – Jordon Arnold (Glenorchy)
- 2016 – Toutai Havea (Lauderdale)
- 2017 – James Holmes (Clarence)
- 2018 – Sherrin Egger (North Launceston)

=== Darrel Baldock Medal winners ===
(Best player in the TSL Grand Final).

- 2009 – Brett Geappen (Clarence)
- 2010 – Cameron Thurley (Clarence)
- 2011 – Nathan O'Donoghue (Launceston)
- 2012 – Jason Laycock (Burnie)
- 2013 – Jobi Harper (South Launceston)
- 2014 – Daniel Roozendaal (North Launceston)
- 2015 – Josh Holland (North Launceston)
- 2016 – Clinton French (Glenorchy)
- 2017 – Bradley Cox-Goodyer (North Launceston)
- 2018 – Bradley Cox-Goodyer (North Launceston)
- 2019 – Josh Ponting (North Launceston)

=== Peter Hudson Medal winners ===
(TSL leading goalkickers).

- 2009 – Brad Dutton (Clarence) – 75
- 2010 – Brian Finch (Launceston) – 94
- 2011 – Brian Finch (Launceston) – 105
- 2012 – Mitchell Williamson (Clarence) – 83
- 2013 – Sonny Whiting (Launceston) – 85
- 2014 – Aaron Cornelius (Glenorchy) – 67
- 2015 – Jaye Bowden (Glenorchy) – 57
- 2016 – Jaye Bowden (Glenorchy) – 75
- 2017 – Jaye Bowden (Glenorchy) – 52
- 2018 – Mitch Thorp (Launceston) – 62
- 2019 – Aiden Grace (Glenorchy) – 50

=== RACT Insurance Player of the Year ===
(Best player as voted by the media).

- 2009 – Jeromey Webberley (Clarence)
- 2010 – Scott Stephens (Launceston)
- 2011 – Cameron Thurley (Clarence)
- 2012 – Luke Shackleton (Burnie)
- 2013 – Mitch Thorp (South Launceston)
- 2014 – Jaye Bowden (Glenorchy)
- 2015 – Taylor Whitford (North Launceston)
- 2016 – Jaye Bowden (Glenorchy)
- 2017 – Jaye Bowden (Glenorchy)
- 2018 – Daniel Joseph (Glenorchy) & Taylor Whitford (North Launceston)
- 2019 – Brad Cox-Goodyer (North Launceston)
