= 1987 TFL Statewide League season =

1987 Australian rules football competition

- Teams: Burnie Hawks; Clarence Kangaroos; Devonport Blues; Glenorchy Magpies; Hobart Tigers; New Norfolk Eagles; North Hobart Demons; North Launceston Robins; Sandy Bay Seagulls; South Launceston Bulldogs
- Premiers: North Hobart
- Minor premiers: North Hobart

Attendance
- Matches played: 96
- Total attendance: 168,899 (1,759 per match)

The 1987 TFL Statewide League premiership season was an Australian rules football competition, staged across Tasmania over 18 roster rounds and six finals series matches between 4 April and 12 September 1987.

This was the second season of statewide football and the League was known as the Cascade-Boags Statewide League under a dual commercial naming-rights sponsorship agreement with both Cascade Brewery in Hobart and Boag's Brewery in Launceston.

== Participating Clubs ==
- Burnie Hawks Football Club
- Clarence District Football Club
- Devonport Football Club
- Glenorchy District Football Club
- Hobart Football Club
- New Norfolk District Football Club
- North Hobart Football Club
- North Launceston Football Club
- Sandy Bay Football Club
- South Launceston Football Club

=== 1987 TFL Statewide League Club Coaches ===
- Warren "Putt" McCarthy (Burnie Hawks)
- Billy Picken (Clarence)
- Roland Crosby (Devonport)
- Danny Ling (Glenorchy)
- Peter Hudson (Hobart)
- Michael Hunnibell (New Norfolk)
- Garry Davidson (North Hobart)
- Tony "Chang" Young (North Launceston)
- Andy Bennett (Sandy Bay)
- Ian Paton (South Launceston)

=== Midas Mufflers League (Reserves) Grand Final ===
- Sandy Bay 19.14 (128) v Glenorchy 15.15 (105) – North Hobart Oval

=== Medibank Private League (Under-19's) Grand Final ===
- New Norfolk 25.15 (165) v North Hobart 9.8 (62) – North Hobart Oval

=== Leading Goalkickers: TFL Statewide League ===
- Paul Dac (New Norfolk) – 80
- Wayne Fox (Hobart) – 80
- Steve McQueen (North Hobart) – 80
- Chris Reynolds (Devonport) – 76

Note: The TFL Goalkicking award was won by New Norfolk's Paul Dac with 80 goals, Dac kicked 14 goals in the last roster match against North Launceston to take the prize, at the completion of the finals series, Dac was joined by Hobart's Wayne Fox and North Hobart's Steve McQueen, who both finished on 80 goals.

=== Medal Winners ===
- David Code (Devonport) – William Leitch Medal
- Craig Randall (Sandy Bay), Mark Radford (Sandy Bay) & Matthew Honner (Glenorchy) – George Watt Medal (Reserves)
- Darren Clifford (North Launceston) – V.A Geard Medal (Under-19's)
- Paul Burnell (Sandy Bay) – D.R Plaister Medal (Under-17's)
- Ian Paton (Tasmania) – Lefroy Medal (Best player in Interstate Matches)

=== Interstate Matches ===
Foster's NFL Shield Match (Saturday, 25 April 1987)

- Tasmania 16.30 (126) v Queensland 9.13 (67) – Att: 3,961 at North Hobart Oval

Foster's NFL Shield Match (Saturday, 23 May 1987)

- Tasmania 14.8 (92) v ACT 11.16 (82) – Att: 3,465 at North Hobart Oval

Foster's NFL Shield Match (Saturday, 30 May 1987)

- VFA 19.18 (132) v Tasmania 16.7 (103) – Att: 867 at Junction Oval, Melbourne

== Season summary ==
The 1987 TFL Statewide League competition got underway on 4 April 1987 and was now a fully statewide concept with clubs from the South, North and North West participating.

There was much excitement on the North West Coast with Devonport undergoing a change of jumper, emblem and colours (formerly Magpies, now Blues) and coastal rival, Burnie Hawks (formerly Cooee) making their debut.

The standout performers this season were North Hobart, who swept all before them winning sixteen out of their eighteen roster matches and finished on top.

Glenorchy, Clarence and Hobart all performed very well throughout the season, all vying for top-two positions at various stages.

1986 Grand Finalists Sandy Bay, with the loss of as many as ten senior players from the previous year's team, performed poorly under Andy Bennett and slid to second last on the ladder by season's end.

Burnie Hawks, Devonport and the much-improved South Launceston all strived for the final spot in the top-five, Burnie Hawks managing to cling to fifth at the end of the roster series, six games (24 points) behind Hobart in fourth.

Devonport, whose history in the NWFU over the previous fifty years had been one of considerable under-achievement, having only won one flag since 1938 were looking in fine form midway through the season and were also challenging for a top-three spot, but fell in a heap at the latter end of the season dropping its final seven matches to miss the five by 10.70%, whilst South Launceston, who had performed very well at the latter end of the season needed to beat the rampaging North Hobart at Youngtown in the final round to make the finals but were demolished by 121-points.

New Norfolk, still sorting out their considerable financial problems stemming back to their 1982 TANFL Premiership year, weren't able to produce consistent football and remained in the bottom three.

North Launceston under coach Tony "Chang" Young struggled again to make an impact and finished on the bottom, however the club had earmarked some major changes to its playing list and coaching staff over the next eighteen months to become a power club once again.

Glenorchy and Clarence would again do battle in the finals, the Magpies winning a classic contest in the Qualifying Final after trailing for most of the first half, only winning in the closing minutes by 13-points.

The following day, Hobart and the Burnie Hawks met in the Elimination Final at KGV Football Park to an unusual sight in TFL Football, a thunderstorm just prior to the opening bounce.

The weather failed to dampen the Tigers spirits as they raced away after quarter-time to take a 51-point victory and earn a shot at Clarence in the First Semi Final.

The Second Semi Final between North Hobart and Glenorchy at North Hobart Oval was pretty much a one-sided contest after quarter-time as the Demons pegged back a slender Magpie lead and raced away with the match to win by 41-points, their followers were jubilant at the chance of seeing their Red & Blue heroes break a long premiership hoodoo.

At KGV Football Park the following day, Hobart and Clarence staged an epic First Semi Final.

The Roos held sway for much of the day including an 11-point three-quarter time lead, but Hobart struck back and 29-minutes into the final quarter, Hobart's Alistair Lynch marked 30-metres out from goal and was felled heavily by Clarence centre half-back Greg Farquahar (who was subsequently suspended for five matches over the incident), Lynch was stretchered from the ground.

Burly Tiger full-forward Wayne Fox took the kick to win the game for Hobart, but field umpire Haydyn Nielsen failed to pay the mandatory 15-metre penalty to Fox after reporting Farquahar, Fox's shot missed narrowly and the Roos were able to hold on for the final few seconds to win by four points.

Glenorchy and Clarence again met in the Preliminary Final at North Hobart Oval before an expectant crowd of almost 7,000 and the match did not disappoint.

The two bitterest rivals in Tasmanian football were neck and neck all day with many lead-changes but the Magpies held sway at all three changes, eventually holding out the Roos by twelve points to play in another Grand Final.

The Grand Final saw North Hobart hoping to end a premiership drought extending back to 1974, Glenorchy aiming for a hat-trick of TFL premierships.

The match was eerily similar to the Second Semi Final clash between the same two sides with Glenorchy getting out a fast start and North Hobart reeling them in and racing away with match.

North Hobart booted a Grand Final record 11.3 (69) in the second quarter to go into half-time 19-points to the good of the Magpies, then inflicting further damage in the third quarter by racing out a 56-point lead at the final change.

North Hobart fans celebrated wildly as their team broke its 13-year premiership drought in emphatic fashion by 52-points.

At North Hobart Oval, works commenced on the building of the $1.25 million Doug Plaister Stand, after the 1923-built Letitia Street Stand was destroyed by a mid-morning fire on Sunday, 31 May.

The stand, which had had works carried out on it in recent years by the Hobart City Council after ABC-Television engineers raised safety concerns over the structure in 1980 and had later been condemned in 1981, was destroyed when rubber matting was deliberately set on fire in a store-room at the rear of the structure, two youths were questioned by police over the fire but no charges were laid, the damage was estimated at $50,000 and the structure was demolished by the Hobart City Council that same day due to safety concerns.

== 1987 TFL Statewide League Ladder ==
| Pos | Team | Pld | W | L | D | PF | PA | PP | Pts |
|---|---|---|---|---|---|---|---|---|---|
| 1 | North Hobart | 18 | 16 | 2 | 0 | 2352 | 1506 | 156.2 | 64 |
| 2 | Glenorchy | 18 | 14 | 4 | 0 | 2141 | 1334 | 160.5 | 56 |
| 3 | Clarence | 18 | 13 | 5 | 0 | 1831 | 1578 | 116.0 | 52 |
| 4 | Hobart | 18 | 13 | 5 | 0 | 1992 | 1750 | 113.8 | 52 |
| 5 | Burnie Hawks | 18 | 7 | 11 | 0 | 1835 | 2012 | 91.2 | 28 |
| 6 | Devonport | 18 | 7 | 11 | 0 | 1606 | 1995 | 80.5 | 28 |
| 7 | South Launceston | 18 | 7 | 11 | 0 | 1704 | 2163 | 78.8 | 28 |
| 8 | New Norfolk | 18 | 6 | 12 | 0 | 1713 | 1897 | 90.3 | 24 |
| 9 | Sandy Bay | 18 | 5 | 13 | 0 | 1694 | 1786 | 94.8 | 20 |
| 10 | North Launceston | 18 | 2 | 16 | 0 | 1463 | 2211 | 66.2 | 8 |

=== Round 1 ===
(Saturday, 4 April 1987)

- Nth Hobart 25.32 (182) v Hobart 10.9 (69) – Att: 2,091 at North Hobart Oval
- Glenorchy 20.21 (141) v Nth Launceston 8.6 (54) – Att: 1,135 at KGV Football Park
- Clarence 21.15 (141) v New Norfolk 13.8 (86) – Att: 1,726 at Bellerive Oval
- Devonport 12.19 (91) v Sandy Bay 10.16 (76) – Att: 2,021 at Devonport Oval
- Sth Launceston 19.14 (128) v Burnie Hawks 15.11 (101) – Att: 744 at Youngtown Memorial Ground

=== Round 2 ===
(Saturday, 11 April 1987)

- Nth Hobart 19.14 (128) v Devonport 13.15 (93) – Att: 2,092 at North Hobart Oval
- Glenorchy 18.19 (127) v Sandy Bay 17.14 (116) – Att: 1,388 at Queenborough Oval
- New Norfolk 27.9 (171) v Sth Launceston 13.17 (95) – Att: 1,196 at Boyer Oval
- Clarence 18.16 (124) v Nth Launceston 15.14 (104) – Att: 796 at York Park
- Hobart 20.10 (130) v Burnie Hawks 10.23 (83) – Att: 1,261 at West Park Oval

=== Round 3 ===
(Saturday, 18 April 1987)

- Hobart 17.19 (121) v New Norfolk 14.18 (102) – Att: 1,294 at North Hobart Oval
- Sandy Bay 17.24 (126) v Nth Launceston 9.19 (73) – Att: 862 at Queenborough Oval
- Nth Hobart 13.17 (95) v Glenorchy 11.9 (75) – Att: 2,984 at KGV Football Park
- Clarence 23.14 (152) v Sth Launceston 21.9 (135) – Att: 774 at Youngtown Memorial Ground
- Devonport 15.15 (105) v Burnie Hawks 14.14 (98) – Att: 1,682 at Devonport Oval

=== Round 4 ===
(Saturday, 2 May 1987)

- Nth Hobart 20.13 (133) v Sandy Bay 20.10 (130) – Att: 2,198 at North Hobart Oval
- Clarence 13.5 (83) v Hobart 10.16 (76) – Att: 1,862 at Bellerive Oval
- Devonport 13.15 (93) v New Norfolk 11.9 (75) – Att: 1,233 at Boyer Oval
- Sth Launceston 16.13 (109) v Nth Launceston 10.5 (65) – Att: 1,101 at York Park
- Glenorchy 15.8 (98) v Burnie Hawks 9.7 (61) – Att: 761 at West Park Oval

=== Round 5 ===
(Saturday, 9 May 1987)

- Hobart 22.13 (145) v Sth Launceston 15.13 (103) – Att: 1,118 at North Hobart Oval
- Burnie Hawks 19.12 (126) v Sandy Bay 17.8 (110) – Att: 1,175 at Queenborough Oval
- Glenorchy 25.13 (163) v New Norfolk 10.9 (69) – Att: 1,534 at KGV Football Park
- Nth Hobart 22.17 (149) v Nth Launceston 15.10 (100) – Att: 808 at York Park
- Clarence 12.17 (89) v Devonport 12.10 (82) – Att: 2,212 at Devonport Oval

=== Round 6 ===
(Saturday, 16 May 1987)

- Hobart 23.13 (151) v Nth Launceston 12.14 (86) – Att: 850 at North Hobart Oval
- Clarence 15.12 (102) v Glenorchy 12.12 (84) – Att: 3,982 at Bellerive Oval
- Sandy Bay 20.5 (125) v New Norfolk 13.18 (96) – Att: 1,118 at Boyer Oval
- Devonport 21.10 (136) v Sth Launceston 16.9 (105) – Att: 1,206 at Youngtown Memorial Ground
- Nth Hobart 22.20 (152) v Burnie Hawks 15.19 (109) – Att: 1,211 at West Park Oval

=== Round 7 ===
(Saturday, 30 May 1987)

- Nth Hobart 17.13 (115) v New Norfolk 11.11 (77) – Att: 1,416 at North Hobart Oval
- Clarence 22.10 (142) v Sandy Bay 8.12 (60) – Att: 1,484 at Queenborough Oval
- Glenorchy 25.24 (174) v Sth Launceston 7.11 (53) – Att: 1,005 at KGV Football Park
- Burnie Hawks 19.17 (131) v Nth Launceston 12.21 (93) – Att: 784 at York Park
- Hobart 12.24 (96) v Devonport 8.11 (59) – Att: 1,890 at Devonport Oval

=== Round 8 ===
(Saturday, 6 June & Sunday, 7 June 1987)

- Nth Hobart 34.20 (224) v Sth Launceston 11.6 (72) – Att: 1,115 at North Hobart Oval
- Hobart 25.13 (163) v Sandy Bay 13.13 (91) – Att: 1,181 at Queenborough Oval
- Glenorchy 18.13 (121) v Devonport 10.12 (72) – Att: 1,351 at KGV Football Park
- New Norfolk 16.11 (107) v Nth Launceston 11.14 (80) – Att: 874 at York Park
- Clarence 19.10 (124) v Burnie Hawks 15.20 (110) – Att: 1,584 at West Park Oval (Sunday)

=== Round 9 ===
(Saturday, 13 June 1987)

- Hobart 24.10 (154) v Glenorchy 19.11 (125) – Att: 2,026 at North Hobart Oval
- Nth Hobart 13.20 (98) v Clarence 8.8 (56) – Att: 5,075 at Bellerive Oval
- New Norfolk 14.11 (95) v Burnie Hawks 11.11 (77) – Att: 911 at Boyer Oval
- Sandy Bay 13.16 (94) v Sth Launceston 11.11 (77) – Att: 638 at Youngtown Memorial Ground
- Devonport 20.15 (135) v Nth Launceston 16.13 (109) – Att: 1,138 at Devonport Oval

=== Round 10 ===
(Saturday, 20 June 1987)

- Nth Hobart 20.18 (138) v Hobart 20.11 (131) – Att: 3,095 at North Hobart Oval
- Devonport 15.15 (105) v Sandy Bay 15.10 (100) – Att: 929 at Queenborough Oval
- New Norfolk 12.14 (86) v Clarence 9.13 (67) – Att: 1,189 at Boyer Oval
- Glenorchy 20.19 (139) v Nth Launceston 12.5 (77) – Att: 713 at York Park
- Burnie Hawks 19.12 (126) v Sth Launceston 14.8 (92) – Att: 721 at West Park Oval

=== Round 11 ===
(Saturday, 27 June 1987)

- Hobart 18.10 (118) v Burnie Hawks 13.13 (91) – Att: 1,069 at North Hobart Oval
- Glenorchy 21.17 (143) v Sandy Bay 7.8 (50) – Att: 1,287 at KGV Football Park
- Clarence 12.8 (80) v Nth Launceston 10.16 (76) – Att: 1,000 at Bellerive Oval
- Sth Launceston 15.9 (99) v New Norfolk 13.14 (92) – Att: 703 at Youngtown Memorial Ground
- Devonport 13.13 (91) v Nth Hobart 11.9 (75) – Att: 1,715 at Devonport Oval

=== Round 12 ===
(Saturday, 4 July 1987)

- Glenorchy 18.22 (130) v Nth Hobart 9.11 (65) – Att: 3,751 at North Hobart Oval
- Hobart 15.12 (102) v New Norfolk 9.14 (68) – Att: 1,268 at Boyer Oval
- Sth Launceston 16.18 (114) v Clarence 14.15 (99) – Att: 981 at Bellerive Oval
- Nth Launceston 16.19 (115) v Sandy Bay 16.15 (111) – Att: 766 at York Park
- Burnie Hawks 30.15 (195) v Devonport 15.9 (99) – Att: 2,064 at West Park Oval

=== Round 13 ===
(Saturday, 11 July 1987)

- Clarence 10.7 (67) v Hobart 9.8 (62) – Att: 1,535 at North Hobart Oval
- Nth Hobart 7.2 (44) v Sandy Bay 3.8 (26) – Att: 886 at Queenborough Oval
- Glenorchy 15.14 (104) v Burnie Hawks 6.8 (44) – Att: 1,028 at KGV Football Park
- Sth Launceston 17.15 (117) v Nth Launceston 7.11 (53) – Att: 1,053 at York Park
- New Norfolk 15.19 (109) v Devonport 11.13 (79) – Att: 1,724 at Devonport Oval

=== Round 14 ===
(Saturday, 18 July 1987)

- Nth Hobart 25.16 (166) v Nth Launceston 10.10 (70) – Att: 1,196 at North Hobart Oval
- Clarence 19.19 (133) v Devonport 12.4 (76) – Att: 1,511 at Bellerive Oval
- Glenorchy 14.12 (96) v New Norfolk 10.4 (64) – Att: 1,467 at Boyer Oval
- Hobart 13.8 (86) v Sth Launceston 12.10 (82) – Att: 805 at Youngtown Memorial Ground
- Burnie Hawks 10.17 (77) v Sandy Bay 10.15 (75) – Att: 821 at West Park Oval

=== Round 15 ===
(Saturday, 25 July 1987)

- Nth Hobart 28.19 (187) v Burnie Hawks 9.8 (62) – Att: 1,373 at North Hobart Oval
- Sandy Bay 17.12 (114) v New Norfolk 11.10 (76) – Att: 910 at Queenborough Oval
- Glenorchy 16.12 (108) v Clarence 13.12 (90) – Att: 2,780 at KGV Football Park
- Hobart 13.7 (85) v Nth Launceston 10.23 (83) – Att: 737 at York Park
- Sth Launceston 16.12 (108) v Devonport 13.17 (95) – Att: 1,228 at Devonport Oval

=== Round 16 ===
(Saturday, 1 August 1987)

- Hobart 24.20 (164) v Devonport 7.9 (51) – Att: 1,292 at North Hobart Oval
- Clarence 12.20 (92) v Sandy Bay 7.12 (54) – Att: 1,259 at Bellerive Oval
- Nth Hobart 24.9 (153) v New Norfolk 16.12 (108) – Att: 1,323 at Boyer Oval
- Sth Launceston 12.14 (86) v Glenorchy 9.13 (67) – Att: 846 at Youngtown Memorial Ground
- Burnie Hawks 19.18 (132) v Nth Launceston 10.12 (72) – Att: 684 at West Park Oval

=== Round 17 ===
(Saturday, 8 August 1987)

- Nth Hobart 11.13 (79) v Clarence 8.11 (59) – Att: 2,468 at North Hobart Oval
- Sandy Bay 17.12 (114) v Sth Launceston 11.14 (80) – Att: 642 at Queenborough Oval
- Glenorchy 20.13 (133) v Hobart 2.2 (14) – Att: 1,960 at KGV Football Park
- Nth Launceston 15.11 (101) v Devonport 11.9 (75) – Att: 873 at York Park
- Burnie Hawks 20.16 (136) v New Norfolk 15.8 (98) – Att: 890 at West Park Oval

=== Round 18 ===
(Saturday, 15 August 1987)

- Hobart 18.16 (124) v Sandy Bay 18.14 (122) – Att: 1,428 at North Hobart Oval
- Clarence 19.17 (131) v Burnie Hawks 12.16 (88) – Att: 1,637 at Bellerive Oval
- New Norfolk 19.19 (133) v Nth Launceston 6.16 (52) – Att: 1,019 at Boyer Oval
- Nth Hobart 24.25 (169) v Sth Launceston 7.6 (48) – Att: 1,609 at Youngtown Memorial Ground
- Glenorchy 17.11 (113) v Devonport 10.8 (68) – Att: 1,426 at Devonport Oval

=== Qualifying Final ===
(Saturday, 22 August 1987)

- Glenorchy: 2.2 (14) | 8.7 (55) | 13.9 (87) | 18.12 (120)
- Clarence: 4.5 (29) | 9.9 (63) | 11.14 (80) | 15.17 (107)
- Attendance: 5,333 at North Hobart Oval

=== Elimination Final ===
(Sunday, 23 August 1987)

- Hobart: 4.2 (26) | 10.5 (65) | 13.8 (86) | 18.11 (119)
- Burnie Hawks: 3.5 (23) | 4.7 (31) | 9.11 (65) | 9.14 (68)
- Attendance: 2,803 at KGV Football Park

=== Second Semi Final ===
(Saturday, 29 August 1987)

- Nth Hobart: 6.1 (37) | 12.8 (80) | 18.9 (117) | 23.14 (152)
- Glenorchy: 7.4 (46) | 8.6 (54) | 14.12 (96) | 16.15 (111)
- Attendance: 6,506 at North Hobart Oval

=== First Semi Final ===
(Sunday, 30 August 1987)

- Clarence: 7.4 (46) | 11.8 (74) | 16.10 (106) | 18.13 (121)
- Hobart: 4.2 (26) | 9.6 (60) | 14.11 (95) | 17.15 (117)
- Attendance: 3,885 at KGV Football Park

=== Preliminary Final ===
(Saturday, 5 September 1987)

- Glenorchy: 3.3 (21) | 8.6 (54) | 13.10 (88) | 18.15 (123)
- Clarence: 2.2 (14) | 7.5 (47) | 11.7 (73) | 17.9 (111)
- Attendance: 6,730 at North Hobart Oval

=== Grand Final ===
(Saturday, 12 September 1987)

- Nth Hobart: 2.4 (16) | 13.7 (85) | 20.16 (136) | 23.20 (158)
- Glenorchy: 5.4 (34) | 10.6 (66) | 12.8 (80) | 16.10 (106)
- Attendance: 17,094 at North Hobart Oval
