= 1988 TFL Statewide League season =

- Teams: Burnie Hawks; Clarence Kangaroos; Devonport Blues; Glenorchy Magpies; Hobart Tigers; New Norfolk Eagles; North Hobart Demons; North Launceston Robins; Sandy Bay Seagulls; South Launceston Bulldogs
- Premiers: Devonport
- Minor premiers: Devonport; 1st minor premiership

Attendance
- Matches played: 96
- Total attendance: 192,947 (2,010 per match)

The 1988 TFL Statewide League premiership season was an Australian rules football competition, staged across Tasmania, Australia over eighteen (18) roster rounds and six (6) finals series matches between 2 April and 17 September 1988.

This was the third season of statewide football and the League was known as the Cascade-Boags Statewide League under a dual commercial naming-rights sponsorship agreement with both Cascade Brewery in Hobart and Boag's Brewery in Launceston.

== Participating Clubs ==
- Burnie Hawks Football Club
- Clarence District Football Club
- Devonport Football Club
- Glenorchy District Football Club
- Hobart Football Club
- New Norfolk District Football Club
- North Hobart Football Club
- North Launceston Football Club
- Sandy Bay Football Club
- South Launceston Football Club

=== 1988 TFL Statewide League Club Coaches ===
- Warren "Putt" McCarthy (Burnie Hawks)
- Billy Picken (Clarence)
- Roland Crosby (Devonport)
- Robert Groenewegen (Glenorchy)
- Mark Browning (Hobart)
- Michael Hunnibell (New Norfolk)
- Garry Davidson (North Hobart)
- Steven Goulding (North Launceston)
- Andy Bennett (Sandy Bay)
- Ian Paton (South Launceston)

=== Midas Mufflers League (Reserves) Grand Final ===
- Glenorchy 19.13 (127) v North Hobart 14.18 (102) – North Hobart Oval

=== Medibank Private League (Under-19's) Grand Final ===
- New Norfolk 10.9 (69) v North Launceston 8.18 (66) – North Hobart Oval

=== Leading Goalkickers: TFL Statewide League ===
- Chris Reynolds (Devonport) – 111
- Wayne Fox (Hobart) – 110
- Byron Howard Jnr – (North Hobart) – 60
- Peter Hardman – (South Launceston) – 56

Note: Hobart's Wayne Fox led the goalkicking at the completion of the roster series, but Devonport's Chris Reynolds later equalled Fox during the finals series, Reynolds booted his only goal in the Grand Final in the final quarter to move ahead of Fox by a single goal.

=== Medal Winners ===
- Adrian Fletcher (Glenorchy) & Michael Seddon (Sandy Bay) – William Leitch Medal
- Steven Hay (Glenorchy) – George Watt Medal (Reserves)
- Steven Byers (New Norfolk) – V.A Geard Medal (Under-19's)
- Paul Banks-Smith (New Norfolk) – D.R Plaister Medal (Under-17's)

=== Interstate Matches ===
Foster's NFL Shield Grand Final (Saturday, 21 May 1988)

- Queensland 13.16 (94) v Tasmania 11.9 (75) – Att: 3,675 at North Hobart Oval

Interstate Match (Saturday, 11 June 1988)

- Tasmania 11.12 (78) v VFA 7.16 (58) – Att: 2,262 at North Hobart Oval

== Season summary ==
The 1988 TFL Statewide League Season was a momentous season in Tasmanian football, and one which would see the TFL Premiership Cup head North for the first time in history.

The season got underway on 2 April, North Hobart, Glenorchy, Hobart and Clarence were the early season flag-favourites in the eyes of most football experts, nobody predicted the rise of Roland Crosby's Devonport, a team which had performed credibly in the first half of 1987 but, owing to a lack of fitness, fell away badly in the second half to miss the finals, the Blues had been in the doldrums for many years having won only one flag since their 1938 NWFU premiership.

Hobart started in magnificent form with Wayne Fox booting 13-goals (six in the third quarter) on the opening day, the Tigers routed New Norfolk with a 20.12 to 2.3 second half in recording a 121-point win while the remaining favourites all started with victories.

Devonport and the Burnie Hawks had started the season well. The Blues booted 36.7 (223) with a 14.4 second quarter to smash a helpless New Norfolk by 175-points in round three, whilst in Hobart the Hawks demolished Glenorchy at KGV on the same day by 77-points to set up the Coastal Showdown on 24 April.

A TFL Statewide League record crowd of 5,423 rolled up to West Park Oval, (a record which stood until 2000), to watch the two sides slug it out with the Hawks coming away with a narrow victory, with over 12,000 attending the round of matches the future of the competition looked to be a rosy one.

Violence was to rear its ugly head at several matches in 1988, the round five clash between New Norfolk and Glenorchy at Boyer Oval featured several ugly incidents on-field and during the last quarter a brawl erupted in the main grandstand, play was halted as up to 100 people surged across the ground to join in the melee as spectators seated in the stand scattered to escape the violence, a large group of fans milled around the boundary line in front of the stand to hurl abuse which was eventually broken up by police officers.

This continued a series of incidents involving the two clubs, two seasons previous at Boyer, Glenorchy's players sitting on the interchange bench at the foot of the main grandstand were pelted with stones by young New Norfolk supporters.

By mid-season, Devonport and Hobart (under new captain-coach Mark Browning) had firmed as flag favourites, Hobart demolished North Hobart by 114-points on 25 June to sit in second place but would then suffer a disastrous slump in form and lose their next six matches (while holding 30+ point leads in at least three of those) to drop out of contention, North Launceston under new captain-coach Steven Goulding would show a marked improvement on its first two seasons in the League by winning nine matches and performing with distinction throughout the season, finishing only two wins outside the five by season's end, with their finals aspirations going down in the last round.

Glenorchy put together a good run leading into the finals as did the Burnie Hawks, Clarence's inconsistent form cost them their chance at finals action and the Roos promptly missed the finals for the first time since 1978.

Round 17 on 13 August saw two players rack up their 100th goal of the season only three and a half minutes apart – Hobart's Wayne Fox booted his 100th goal twenty-six minutes into the third quarter of the match against Sandy Bay at North Hobart Oval, whilst at KGV, Devonport's burly full-forward Chris Reynolds notched up his century at the thirty-minute mark of the third quarter in his side's loss to Glenorchy.

In the final round, the Burnie Hawks eked out a narrow victory over a desperate New Norfolk at Boyer to hang on to fifth spot, with North Launceston failing to beat Devonport at Devonport costing the Robins a spot in the Five, North Hobart also needing a win to ensure their spot in the finals held out Clarence by 16-points at home to claim fourth spot by 0.21%.

At the other end of the table, New Norfolk and South Launceston had both had very poor seasons with just five wins between them, New Norfolk held a public meeting in an attempt to raise funds in the town to try to entice an ex-VFL player to come down and coach the Eagles with a long-term view of recruiting some experienced players to the club.

The finals series got underway on 27 August with Glenorchy outlasting Sandy Bay in a high-standard Qualifying Final at North Hobart, whilst the following day, the fireworks would explode big-time at Devonport in the Elimination Final between Burnie Hawks and North Hobart.

In one of the most violent matches seen in Tasmanian football for years, the Hawks would race away with the match early and not give the disappointing Demons a sniff.

Hawks defender Dale Whish-Wilson sparked off much of the violence when he was reported for an ugly incident involving North Hobart's Mark McQueen in the third quarter, some 60-metres behind play.

So angry were the North Hobart players that the whole Demon team raced in to confront Whish-Wilson, Burnie Hawks coach Warren "Putt" McCarthy had ordered Whish-Wilson from the ground after the incident and as he was leaving the ground the Demon players chased him over the boundary line, across the cement bike track and over the fence in front of the Frank Matthews Stand to continue the brawl.

In a media interview after North Hobart's 63-point loss, coach Garry Davidson lashed out at the umpiring standards, labeling them 'a joke' claiming his 'younger players were bashed out of the match by thugs with no protection whatsoever from the umpires'.

For his part, Whish-Wilson was suspended for four matches by the TFL tribunal, a suspension which also riled Garry Davidson for its leniency, and Devonport police announced its intention to charge Whish-Wilson with assault following the incident on McQueen and he was later charged and sentenced to serve 49-hours of community service orders. McQueen spent two nights in the North West General Hospital following the incident.

Devonport and Glenorchy would meet at North Hobart in the Second Semi Final, the Blues proved too good all day despite a late rally by the Magpies, going on to win by 20-points to become the first Northern-based side to play in a TFL Grand Final.

The Burnie Hawks travelled to KGV the following day to meet Sandy Bay in the First Semi Final, the Seagulls had been in solid form all season finishing in third spot, and despite leading by 34-points in the second quarter the Bay would see their lead evaporate but still held onto a decent, 21-point lead at three-quarter time.

The Burnie Hawks ran all over a frustrated, disappointed and dispirited Seagull team to win by 14-points, sending the Bay out in straight sets and keeping the dream of an all-Coastal Grand Final alive for another week.

The Preliminary Final saw Glenorchy and the Burnie Hawks do battle at North Hobart Oval for the right to challenge Devonport in the Grand Final, the Hawks (and their predecessor Cooee) had a lamentable record at North Hobart having never won there previously and had also given up a 50-point lead over North Hobart there earlier in the season.

The match was a massive anti-climax as Glenorchy bolted out to a 69-point lead at half-time, the Hawks having booted only one major to the long break.

As the rain fell late in the third quarter, much of the crowd left in droves as the Magpies continued to romp away with the contest, eventually winning by a record 110-points, the Hawks would not win at North Hobart Oval for another six years.

An all-time TFL Statewide League record crowd of 17,878 attended the Grand Final in showery and gloomy conditions, a massive brawl erupted prior to the opening bounce, caused in part by the brass band failing to leave the ground on time when the players were in their positions and ready to go.

So fearsome was the brawl that the umpires decided to start the match without waiting for the siren to sound, several stoushes continued around the ground and the Blues continued on their merry way with a five-goal to one opening term.

The second and third quarters were low scoring and the Blues continued to hold sway by 20-points at the final change.

Devonport showed why they were the best team in the competition in 1988 by romping away in the final quarter in wet conditions to triumph by 43-points and become the first club to take the TFL premiership cup away from the South in 110-years. The win made even more meritorious by the fact that their coach, Roland Crosby later revealed he had suffered from heart problems late in the season.

At North Hobart Oval, the 560-seat Doug Plaister Stand, built at a cost of $1.25 million and jointly funded by the Tasmanian Government, Hobart City Council and the TFL was opened on 10 September 1988 for the Preliminary Final between Glenorchy and the Burnie Hawks.

== 1988 TFL Statewide League Ladder ==
Pos	Team	Pld	W	L	D	PF	PA	PP	Pts
1	Devonport	18	14	4	0	2125	1587	133.9	56
2	Glenorchy	18	12	6	0	1973	1685	117.1	48
3	Sandy Bay	18	12	6	0	1905	1747	109.0	48
4	North Hobart	18	11	7	0	1936	1812	106.8	44
5	Burnie Hawks	18	11	7	0	2057	1929	106.6	44
6	North Launceston	18	9	9	0	1744	1656	105.3	36
7	Hobart	18	8	10	0	2134	1919	111.2	32
8	Clarence	18	8	10	0	1962	1891	103.8	32
9	South Launceston	18	3	15	0	1509	2219	68.0	12
10	New Norfolk	18	2	16	0	1428	2315	61.7	8

=== Round 1 ===
(Saturday, 2 April & Monday, 4 April 1988)

- Hobart 27.19 (181) v New Norfolk 8.12 (60) – Att: 1,521 at North Hobart Oval
- Clarence 26.18 (174) v Burnie Hawks 19.16 (130) – Att: 1,720 at Bellerive Oval
- Sandy Bay 24.18 (162) v Nth Launceston 8.14 (62) – Att: 1,409 at York Park
- Devonport 21.17 (143) v Sth Launceston 10.6 (66) – Att: 1,525 at Devonport Oval
- Nth Hobart 12.19 (91) v Glenorchy 11.8 (74) – Att: 3,273 at KGV Football Park (Monday)

=== Round 2 ===
(Saturday, 9 April 1988)

- Nth Hobart 17.18 (120) v Hobart 11.13 (79) – Att: 3,090 at North Hobart Oval
- Devonport 17.21 (123) v Sandy Bay 12.16 (88) – Att: 1,047 at Queenborough Oval
- New Norfolk 15.11 (101) v Clarence 11.14 (80) – Att: 1,258 at Boyer Oval
- Glenorchy 13.18 (96) v Sth Launceston 10.12 (72) – Att: 906 at Youngtown Memorial Ground
- Burnie Hawks 19.18 (132) v Nth Launceston 16.19 (115) – Att: 1,108 at West Park Oval

=== Round 3 ===
(Saturday, 16 April 1988)

- Clarence 25.13 (163) v Hobart 19.17 (131) – Att: 2,342 at North Hobart Oval
- Sandy Bay 20.6 (126) v Nth Hobart 15.12 (102) – Att: 1,623 at Queenborough Oval
- Burnie Hawks 25.25 (175) v Glenorchy 14.14 (98) – Att: 1,412 at KGV Football Park
- Nth Launceston 23.19 (157) v Sth Launceston 15.6 (96) – Att: 1,620 at York Park
- Devonport 36.7 (223) v New Norfolk 6.12 (48) – Att: 1,744 at Devonport Oval

=== Round 4 ===
(Saturday, 23 April, Sunday, 24 April & Monday, 25 April 1988)

- Nth Hobart 19.23 (137) v Sth Launceston 15.17 (107) – Att: 1,300 at North Hobart Oval
- Sandy Bay 18.23 (131) v New Norfolk 12.14 (86) – Att: 1,177 at Boyer Oval
- Nth Launceston 22.22 (154) v Hobart 15.6 (96) – Att: 1,302 at York Park
- Burnie Hawks 17.25 (127) v Devonport 15.23 (113) – Att: 5,423 at West Park Oval (Sunday)
- Glenorchy 13.17 (95) v Clarence 14.10 (94) – Att: 3,200 at Bellerive Oval (Monday)

=== Round 5 ===
(Saturday, 30 April 1988)

- Hobart 16.16 (112) v Burnie Hawks 15.16 (106) – Att: 1,505 at North Hobart Oval
- Clarence 18.13 (121) v Nth Launceston 17.14 (116) – Att: 1,465 at Bellerive Oval
- Glenorchy 19.21 (135) v New Norfolk 13.8 (86) – Att: 1,511 at Boyer Oval
- Sandy Bay 18.15 (123) v Sth Launceston 10.16 (76) – Att: 829 at Youngtown Memorial Ground
- Devonport 22.12 (144) v Nth Hobart 15.13 (103) – Att: 1,999 at Devonport Oval

=== Round 6 ===
(Saturday, 7 May 1988)

- Nth Hobart 11.12 (78) v Nth Launceston 7.9 (51) – Att: 1,520 at North Hobart Oval
- Burnie Hawks 12.9 (81) v Sandy Bay 11.9 (75) – Att: 1,176 at Queenborough Oval
- Hobart 21.17 (143) v Glenorchy 13.9 (87) – Att: 2,268 at KGV Football Park
- Sth Launceston 20.11 (131) v New Norfolk 12.7 (79) – Att: 807 at Youngtown Memorial Ground
- Devonport 14.11 (95) v Clarence 10.9 (69) – Att: 2,253 at Devonport Oval

=== Round 7 ===
(Saturday, 14 May 1988)

- Devonport 17.14 (116) v Hobart 12.15 (87) – Att: 2,185 at North Hobart Oval
- Sandy Bay 17.21 (123) v Clarence 11.15 (81) – Att: 2,037 at Bellerive Oval
- Nth Hobart 23.24 (162) v New Norfolk 11.11 (77) – Att: 1,399 at Boyer Oval
- Sth Launceston 20.12 (132) v Burnie Hawks 16.12 (108) – Att: 1,102 at West Park Oval
- Glenorchy 23.20 (158) v Nth Launceston 11.14 (80) – Att: 1,640 at York Park

=== Round 8 ===
(Saturday, 28 May 1988)

- Nth Hobart 18.19 (127) v Burnie Hawks 10.17 (77) – Att: 1,977 at North Hobart Oval
- Hobart 27.8 (170) v Sandy Bay 12.12 (84) – Att: 1,595 at Queenborough Oval
- Nth Launceston 11.12 (78) v New Norfolk 9.16 (70) – Att: 974 at Boyer Oval
- Clarence 27.10 (172) v Sth Launceston 16.13 (109) – Att: 983 at Youngtown Memorial Ground
- Devonport 12.15 (87) v Glenorchy 10.12 (72) – Att: 2,382 at Devonport Oval

=== Round 9 ===
(Saturday, 4 June 1988)

- Hobart 27.6 (168) v Sth Launceston 14.10 (94) – Att: 1,153 at North Hobart Oval
- Glenorchy 24.27 (171) v Sandy Bay 6.11 (47) – Att: 1,768 at KGV Football Park
- Nth Hobart 18.19 (127) v Clarence 14.14 (98) – Att: 2,821 at Bellerive Oval
- Nth Launceston 20.17 (137) v Devonport 17.14 (116) – Att: 1,739 at York Park
- Burnie Hawks 17.16 (118) v New Norfolk 18.5 (113) – Att: 1,137 at West Park Oval

=== Round 10 ===
(Saturday, 18 June 1988)

- Glenorchy 14.18 (102) v Nth Hobart 13.8 (86) – Att: 3,828 at North Hobart Oval
- Sandy Bay 13.15 (93) v Nth Launceston 13.12 (90) – Att: 889 at Queenborough Oval
- Hobart 21.10 (136) v New Norfolk 14.9 (93) – Att: 1,025 at Boyer Oval
- Devonport 27.6 (168) v Sth Launceston 14.10 (94) – Att: 948 at Youngtown Memorial Ground
- Burnie Hawks 13.13 (91) v Clarence 6.13 (49) – Att: 1,296 at West Park Oval

=== Round 11 ===
(Saturday, 25 June 1988)

- Hobart 29.11 (185) v Nth Hobart 10.11 (71) – Att: 2,695 at North Hobart Oval
- Glenorchy 19.14 (128) v Sth Launceston 13.17 (95) – Att: 1,093 at KGV Football Park
- Clarence 19.13 (127) v New Norfolk 9.15 (69) – Att: 1,137 at Bellerive Oval
- Nth Launceston 14.16 (100) v Burnie Hawks 13.13 (91) – Att: 2,023 at York Park
- Devonport 12.14 (86) v Sandy Bay 11.12 (78) – Att: 1,628 at Devonport Oval

=== Split Round 12 & 13 ===
(Saturday, 2 July & Sunday, 3 July 1988)

- Clarence 25.14 (164) v Hobart 11.14 (80) – Att: 2,726 at Bellerive Oval
- Devonport 11.19 (85) v New Norfolk 10.9 (69) – Att: 1,001 at Boyer Oval
- Burnie Hawks 27.20 (182) v Glenorchy 17.10 (112) – Att: 1,647 at West Park Oval (Sunday)

=== Split Round 12 & 13 (Continued – Part 1) ===
(Saturday, 9 July & Sunday, 10 July 1988)

- Sandy Bay 15.12 (102) v Nth Hobart 10.11 (71) – Att: 1,798 at North Hobart Oval
- Clarence 13.13 (91) v Glenorchy 10.3 (63) – Att: 2,399 at KGV Football Park
- Sth Launceston 5.5 (35) v Nth Launceston 2.7 (19) – Att: 810 at Youngtown Memorial Ground
- Devonport 18.11 (119) v Burnie Hawks 7.11 (53) – Att: 3,231 at Devonport Oval (Sunday)

=== Split Round 12 & 13 (Continued – Part 2) ===
(Saturday, 16 July 1988)

- Nth Launceston 16.13 (109) v Hobart 14.13 (97) – Att: 1,500 at North Hobart Oval
- Sandy Bay 19.14 (128) v New Norfolk 12.12 (84) – Att: 987 at Queenborough Oval
- Nth Hobart 12.16 (88) v Sth Launceston 10.6 (66) – Att: 812 at Youngtown Memorial Ground

=== Round 14 ===
(Saturday, 23 July 1988)

- Nth Hobart 20.7 (127) v Devonport 12.15 (87) – Att: 2,350 at North Hobart Oval
- Sandy Bay 19.17 (131) v Sth Launceston 10.13 (73) – Att: 842 at Queenborough Oval
- Glenorchy 23.14 (152) v New Norfolk 8.10 (58) – Att: 1,267 at KGV Football Park
- Nth Launceston 18.13 (121) v Clarence 7.6 (48) – Att: 2,057 at York Park
- Burnie Hawks 23.9 (147) v Hobart 11.12 (78) – Att: 1,571 at West Park Oval

=== Round 15 ===
(Saturday, 30 July 1988)

- Glenorchy 15.9 (99) v Hobart 9.19 (73) – Att: 2,422 at North Hobart Oval
- Devonport 16.11 (107) v Clarence 11.18 (84) – Att: 1,856 at Bellerive Oval
- New Norfolk 15.13 (103) v Sth Launceston 8.19 (67) – Att: 861 at Boyer Oval
- Nth Launceston 18.15 (123) v Nth Hobart 6.10 (46) – Att: 2,420 at York Park
- Sandy Bay 15.13 (103) v Burnie Hawks 14.8 (92) – Att: 1,246 at West Park Oval

=== Round 16 ===
(Saturday, 6 August 1988)

- Nth Hobart 23.25 (163) v New Norfolk 12.6 (78) – Att: 1,327 at North Hobart Oval
- Glenorchy 9.20 (74) v Nth Launceston 7.11 (53) – Att: 1,828 at KGV Football Park
- Sandy Bay 19.17 (131) v Clarence 10.13 (73) – Att: 1,651 at Bellerive Oval
- Burnie Hawks 15.14 (104) v Sth Launceston 12.13 (85) – Att: 670 at Youngtown Memorial Ground
- Devonport 17.16 (118) v Hobart 13.12 (90) – Att: 1,975 at Devonport Oval

=== Round 17 ===
(Saturday, 13 August 1988)

- Sandy Bay 16.16 (112) v Hobart 17.8 (110) – Att: 1,559 at North Hobart Oval
- Glenorchy 19.24 (138) v Devonport 16.12 (108) – Att: 2,285 at KGV Football Park
- Clarence 27.15 (177) v Sth Launceston 13.6 (84) – Att: 930 at Bellerive Oval
- Nth Launceston 18.14 (122) v New Norfolk 8.6 (54) – Att: 1,480 at York Park
- Burnie Hawks 20.17 (137) v Nth Hobart 19.11 (125) – Att: 1,680 at West Park Oval

=== Round 18 ===
(Saturday, 20 August 1988)

- Nth Hobart 17.11 (113) v Clarence 14.13 (97) – Att: 2,417 at North Hobart Oval
- Glenorchy 17.17 (119) v Sandy Bay 10.7 (67) – Att: 2,531 at Queenborough Oval
- Burnie Hawks 17.6 (108) v New Norfolk 14.15 (99) – Att: 902 at Boyer Oval
- Hobart 18.10 (118) v Sth Launceston 5.13 (43) – Att: 614 at Youngtown Memorial Ground
- Devonport 12.15 (87) v Nth Launceston 8.9 (57) – Att: 2,230 at Devonport Oval

=== Qualifying Final ===
(Saturday, 27 August 1988)

- Glenorchy: 5.5 (35) | 9.6 (60) | 14.8 (92) | 17.12 (114)
- Sandy Bay: 5.3 (33) | 9.8 (62) | 12.9 (81) | 15.13 (103)
- Attendance: 4,580 at North Hobart Oval

=== Elimination Final ===
(Sunday, 28 August 1988)

- Burnie Hawks: 8.6 (54) | 10.8 (68) | 17.12 (114) | 21.15 (141)
- North Hobart: 3.0 (18) | 6.1 (37) | 9.4 (58) | 12.6 (78)
- Attendance: 4,043 at Devonport Oval

=== Second Semi Final ===
(Saturday, 3 September 1988)

- Devonport: 6.1 (37) | 10.4 (64) | 12.9 (81) | 15.13 (103)
- Glenorchy: 1.2 (8) | 6.5 (41) | 7.8 (50) | 12.11 (83)
- Attendance: 4,777 at North Hobart Oval

=== First Semi Final ===
(Sunday, 4 September 1988)

- Burnie Hawks: 1.4 (10) | 5.11 (41) | 7.13 (55) | 12.19 (91)
- Sandy Bay: 7.1 (43) | 9.5 (59) | 11.10 (76) | 11.11 (77)
- Attendance: 2,369 at KGV Football Park

=== Preliminary Final ===
(Saturday, 10 September 1988)

- Glenorchy: 6.3 (39) | 12.8 (80) | 17.17 (119) | 24.22 (166)
- Burnie Hawks: 1.2 (8) | 1.5 (11) | 4.6 (30) | 8.8 (56)
- Attendance: 6,631 at North Hobart Oval

=== Grand Final ===
(Saturday, 17 September 1988) (ABC-TV highlights: 1988 TFL Grand Final)

- Devonport: 5.2 (32) | 7.3 (45) | 10.4 (64) | 15.7 (97)
- Glenorchy: 1.2 (8) | 4.2 (26) | 7.2 (44) | 8.6 (54)
- Attendance: 17,878 at North Hobart Oval
