= 1992 TFL Statewide League season =

- Teams: Burnie Hawks; Clarence Kangaroos; Devonport Blues; Glenorchy Magpies; Hobart Tigers; New Norfolk Eagles; North Hobart Demons; North Launceston Robins; Sandy Bay Seagulls; South Launceston Bulldogs
- Premiers: North Hobart
- Minor premiers: North Launceston; 3rd minor premiership

Attendance
- Matches played: 96
- Total attendance: 135,396 (1,410 per match)

The 1992 TFL Statewide League premiership season was an Australian rules football competition staged across Tasmania over eighteen roster rounds and six finals series matches between 4 April and 19 September 1992.

This was the seventh season of statewide football competition and The League was known as the Cascade-Boags Statewide League under a dual commercial naming-rights sponsorship agreement with both Cascade Brewery in Hobart and Boag's Brewery in Launceston.

== Participating Clubs ==
- Burnie Hawks Football Club
- Clarence District Football Club
- Devonport Blues Football Club
- Glenorchy District Football Club
- Hobart Football Club
- New Norfolk District Football Club
- North Hobart Football Club
- North Launceston Football Club
- Sandy Bay Football Club
- South Launceston Football Club

=== 1992 TFL Statewide League Club Coaches ===
- Richard Lakeland (Burnie Hawks)
- Leigh McConnon (Clarence)
- Peter Knights (Devonport)
- Kim Excell (Glenorchy)
- Mark Browning (Hobart)
- Peter Chisnall (New Norfolk)
- Mark Yeates (North Hobart)
- Steven Goulding (North Launceston)
- Paul Jeffries (Sandy Bay)
- Bob Keddie (South Launceston)

=== St Luke's Cup (Reserves) Grand Final ===
- Glenorchy 11.14 (80) v Nth Hobart 9.11 (65)

=== Statewide League Colts (Under-19's) Grand Final ===
- Glenorchy 10.9 (69) v Nth Launceston 8.9 (57)

=== Leading Goalkickers: TFL Statewide League ===
- Byron Howard Jnr (Nth Hobart) – 92
- Keith Robinson (Hobart) – 86
- Shane Fell (Glenorchy) – 61
- Brad Pearce (Sth Launceston) – 57

=== Medal Winners ===
- Jason Gibson (Nth Launceston) – William Leitch Medal
- Darryn Perry (North Hobart) – Darrel Baldock Medal (Best player in TFL Grand Final)
- John Rainbird (New Norfolk) – George Watt Medal (Reserves)
- Alan Bond (Hobart) – V.A Geard Medal (Under-19's)
- Craig Grace (Glenorchy) – D.R Plaister Medal (Under-17's)
- Michael Winter (Hobart) – Weller Arnold Medal (Best player in Intrastate Match)

=== Intrastate Matches ===
Area of Origin Match (Saturday, 13 June 1992)

- South 21.16 (142) v North 7.12 (54) – Att: 3,050 at North Hobart Oval

=== 1992 TFL Club Home Attendance Figures ===
- Nth Hobart: 14,135 for 9 matches at 1,570
- Hobart: 13,847 for 9 matches at 1,538
- New Norfolk: 12,783 for 9 matches at 1,420
- Devonport: 12,249 for 9 matches at 1,361
- Nth Launceston: 12,149 for 9 matches at 1,349
- Clarence: 11,584 for 9 matches at 1,287
- Glenorchy: 11,027 for 9 matches at 1,225
- Sandy Bay: 8,224 for 9 matches at 913
- Sth Launceston: 7,769 for 9 matches at 863
- Burnie Hawks: 7,021 for 9 matches at 780

== Season summary ==
1992 would prove to be a disastrous season for the Tasmanian Football League as the effects of the economic recession began to bite the competition hard.

A number of member clubs would face serious financial ruin, with Glenorchy announcing an increasing debt of $350,000 which had been the result of gross mis-management and some embezzlement at the club, North Hobart would announce that they were also in dire financial trouble which was related to the blowout in costs of building their NHFC Social Club building in 1991.

Sandy Bay announced that they were also on the brink of financial oblivion and needed an immediate injection of more than $70,000 in the middle of the season in order to continue participation for the rest of the season, as a "Save The Bay" foundation was formed and special charity matches were staged by the club in order to raise urgent funds.

Clarence president Roger Curtis announced in May that "Clarence Football Club's financial position is worse than all the other clubs", this was related to the costs of the building of their Petchey Street clubrooms in 1983 which had come back to haunt them.

In August, Burnie Hawks instigated merger talks with cross-town rival, NTFL club Burnie Tigers as the economic crisis had disastrous effects on the city of Burnie itself with the city's biggest employer, Associated Pulp Paper Manufacturing (APPM) shedding jobs amid violent demonstrations on the city's port, the Hawks now faced a debt of more than $200,000 as crowds nosedived sharply.

By July, General Manager of the TFL Barry Breen instigated crisis talks at Youngtown with delegates, sponsors and advisers of all TFL clubs involved in discussions.

Crowds were to drop sharply during the season, despite fifteen fewer roster games from the previous season, crowds fell by 33,703 from 1991, the finals series saw crowds fall by 8,330 from the previous season.

The TFL were unhappy with ABC-Television's decision to telecast full matches live against the gate, the first match to be broadcast in full live across Tasmania was on 27 June 1992 when Clarence upset North Launceston at York Park for the Robins first loss of the season, in front a dismal attendance of just 1,049.

By 1 August, the effects of live broadcasting was beginning to be problematic for the TFL, the Round 15 roster of that day, in windy conditions, was the first time in the history of Statewide football that no fixture attracted a crowd of more than 1,000 patrons during a roster round, the previous time a TFL roster round failed to draw more than 1,000 patrons to any match was on 12 May 1945.

Amid all the doom and gloom, the season commenced in hot conditions on 4 April, with temperatures reaching 31 °C in both Hobart and Launceston and 35 °C at Boyer where New Norfolk and Clarence staged a magnificent spectacle which ended in a draw.

North Launceston, North Hobart and Hobart would be the season's premiership favourites and as it progressed, that's how it would turn out.

North Launceston started the season in magnificent touch by winning their first ten matches, including one match dubbed as "Match of the Season" against Hobart at North Hobart Oval on 7 June in front of almost 3,000 fans, where both sides put on an enthralling contest featuring seventeen goals in the second quarter which saw Hobart race out to a strong lead before the Robins hit back strongly in the second half to win by 44-points.

The Robins lost only two matches for the season (to Clarence and North Hobart) and were firm favourites to take their first flag since their 1983 NTFA triumph.

North Hobart were equally as strong, the Demons under Mark Yeates won ten out of their final eleven matches going into the finals, their one loss being a shock 62-point loss to a much improved South Launceston at Youngtown on 15 August, but this proved to be a mere blip on the radar as the season went on.

Hobart also started the season in top form, Mark Browning's Tigers won eight out their first nine matches (their only loss being a last kick of the match defeat to Clarence on 9 May) and after an awesome first-half display against North Launceston on 7 June, the Tigers stopped to a walk and eventually were overrun by a powerful Robins' team.

By mid-season the Tigers were to be decimated by a long injury list and despite managing to scrape out a number of unimpressive victories late in the season, the Tigers appeared to be well behind the two North's in the title race.

Both Clarence and Devonport had up and down seasons but despite lacking the talent of the top teams, both were able to hit form at the right time to take a finals spot, the Roos going into the finals in the better form of the two.

Outside the finals, South Launceston, despite being very inconsistent were able to produce their best season of football since 1987, ultimately their very poor percentage would cost them any chance at finals action, but there was great optimism for the future of the Bulldogs after several years of discussions on whether the club should remain a TFL member.

Peter Chisnall's New Norfolk would prove to be a great disappointment, the Eagles and Chisnall's honeymoon period appeared to be over with Chisnall increasingly frustrated at his team's performances and eventually announcing his resignation at the end of the season.

Meanwhile, the bottom three consisted of three clubs that were perilously close to financial ruin, Burnie Hawks, Sandy Bay and Glenorchy, the Magpies sitting on the bottom of the ladder for the first time since 1963.

Finals action commenced on 29 August in what was to be a cold and wet finals series.

North Hobart and Hobart faced off in the Qualifying Final on Saturday, 29 August with the Demons handing Hobart a football lesson, despite keeping in touch for most of the first half, the Tigers were to go goal-less from late in the second quarter until Geoff Keogh booted Hobart's only goal for the second half right on the final siren, meanwhile the super-confident Demons would boot 11.1 in the final quarter to run out 97-point victors.

On Sunday, 30 August, an out of form Devonport were to host Clarence at a rain-sodden Devonport Oval in the Elimination Final, with the Roos proving too good on the day to win by 22-points.

The following Saturday, an epic Second Semi Final at York Park saw North Launceston and North Hobart fight out a thrilling contest.

The two sides had been in red-hot form all season and in the first half, the Demons raced out to a 22-point lead, in the third quarter the Robins roared back into contention and eventually hit the front late in the third quarter with their fans in full voice behind them, the Robins still lead the match deep into time-on in the final quarter until North Hobart's Warren Walker managed to snap a match winning goal with moments to go and take the match by 3-points, stunning the home crowd into complete silence and booking themselves a spot in the Grand Final for the second year in succession.

Hobart were able to put the previous week's dismal display behind them and hit form the following day in the First Semi Final and run away from Clarence to record a solid 37-point win and book themselves a place in the Preliminary Final against clear favourites' North Launceston.

The Preliminary Final at North Hobart Oval on 12 September would go down as one of the worst days ever seen in finals football in Hobart since the infamous 1960 Grand Final and the equally infamous 1957 Second Semi Final.

North Launceston had picked a side of tall players to come down and tackle a Hobart side which lacked height, only to see torrents of rain fall early in the morning and through the Under-19 and Reserves fixtures which rendered the ground in deplorable condition.

Temperatures plummeted to below 4 °C for much of the senior match as sleet, light snow, wind and occasional heavy periods of rain hit North Hobart Oval, the ground itself resembled a lake with virtually the entire surface with the exception of the terraced wing being a quagmire.

A crowd of only 1,853 (the lowest TFL Preliminary Final crowd ever recorded to that stage) braved the freezing conditions to see Hobart boot only five goals for the match, four of them resulting from free-kicks to destroy the Robins premiership hopes and send them out in straight-sets.

The TFL, outraged at the paltry attendance at the match and with ABC-Television for televising the whole game live, ordered the broadcaster to not televise the Grand Final live on 19 September.

The big match saw North Hobart, the hottest favourites in two decades to win the premiership facing Hobart in fine conditions in a repeat of their 1989 Grand Final.

After a tight match for much of the first-half, it was Hobart who were attacking strongly in the early part of the third quarter, the crowd of just under 12,000 were anticipating a possible upset, but the Demons soon sprang to life and produced an inspiring burst of football late in the third quarter to jump out to a 15-point lead at three-quarter time.

The Demons were able to control the play for much of the final quarter as Hobart had run out of steam and North Hobart went on to take the premiership by 35-points, with the by now retired Captain-Coach Mark Yeates announcing his retirement as coach of North Hobart only seconds after the siren.

Yeates had been a sales representative with the Schweppes soft drink company in North Hobart in his two-year term at the Demons, but had accepted a more lucrative employment offer interstate for the following year.

Meanwhile, for Hobart, this match was to mark the end of the Tigers as a power in State football, in October 1992 Captain-Coach Mark Browning also resigned as coach of the club and after a chaotic situation in regard to appointing a senior coach the following season, the Tigers found themselves with a young, struggling squad for several years and were to find themselves in deep financial trouble which would see them have to leave the TFL just five seasons later in a battle to even stay alive.

== 1992 TFL Statewide League Ladder ==
Pos	Team	Pld	W	L	D	PF	PA	PP	Pts
1	North Launceston	18	16	2	0	2102	1289	163.1	64
2	North Hobart	18	15	3	0	2320	1515	153.1	60
3	Hobart	18	12	5	1	2053	1744	117.7	50
4	Clarence	18	10	6	2	1909	1562	122.2	44
5	Devonport	18	10	8	0	1664	1538	108.2	40
6	South Launceston	18	8	10	0	1662	2082	79.8	32
7	New Norfolk	18	7	10	1	1868	1850	101.0	30
8	Burnie Hawks	18	4	14	0	1568	2118	74.0	18 (Note: 2 bonus points?)
9	Sandy Bay	18	3	15	0	1341	2001	67.0	12
10	Glenorchy	18	3	15	0	1371	2159	63.5	12

=== Round 1 ===
(Saturday, 4 April & Sunday, 5 April 1992)

- Nth Hobart 22.16 (148) v Devonport 13.9 (87) - Att: 1,608 at North Hobart Oval
- New Norfolk 19.7 (121) v Clarence 18.13 (121) - Att: 2,069 at Boyer Oval
- Nth Launceston 24.16 (160) v Sth Launceston 15.7 (97) - Att: 2,666 at York Park
- Burnie Hawks 22.14 (146) v Glenorchy 9.11 (65) - Att: 964 at West Park Oval
- Hobart 17.14 (116) v Sandy Bay 14.16 (100) - Att: 1,743 at Queenborough Oval (Sunday)

=== Round 2 ===
(Saturday, 11 April 1992)

- Hobart 19.13 (127) v Burnie Hawks 8.17 (65) - Att: 1,043 at North Hobart Oval
- Nth Hobart 22.21 (153) v Glenorchy 12.10 (82) - Att: 1,662 at KGV Football Park
- Nth Launceston 24.11 (155) v Clarence 9.13 (67) - Att: 1,544 at Bellerive Oval
- Sth Launceston 18.29 (137) v Sandy Bay 12.10 (82) - Att: 949 at Youngtown Memorial Ground
- Devonport 19.16 (130) v New Norfolk 11.6 (72) - Att: 1,641 at Devonport Oval

=== Round 3 ===
(Saturday, 18 April & Monday 20 April 1992)

- Clarence 21.18 (144) v Sandy Bay 4.9 (33) - Att: 1,161 at Queenborough Oval
- Nth Hobart 22.10 (142) v New Norfolk 14.16 (100) - Att: 1,946 at Boyer Oval
- Burnie Hawks 16.19 (115) v Sth Launceston 13.14 (92) - Att: 764 at West Park Oval
- Hobart 20.22 (142) v Glenorchy 15.9 (99) - Att: 1,494 at North Hobart Oval (Monday)
- Nth Launceston 14.22 (106) v Devonport 6.5 (41) - Att: 1,065 at York Park (Monday)

=== Round 4 ===
(Saturday, 25 April 1992)

- Nth Launceston 24.13 (157) v Nth Hobart 12.16 (88) - Att: 2,394 at North Hobart Oval
- Glenorchy 19.12 (126) v New Norfolk 18.13 (121) - Att: 1,699 at KGV Football Park
- Clarence 18.9 (117) v Burnie Hawks 12.11 (83) - Att: 1,196 at Bellerive Oval
- Hobart 19.17 (131) v Sth Launceston 8.15 (63) - Att: 938 at Youngtown Memorial Ground
- Devonport 14.16 (100) v Sandy Bay 8.8 (56) - Att: 924 at Devonport Oval

=== Round 5 ===
(Saturday, 2 May & Saturday, 9 May 1992)

- Sth Launceston 15.13 (103) v Glenorchy 13.15 (93) - Att: 1,342 at KGV Football Park (2 May)
- Clarence 15.11 (101) v Hobart 13.20 (98) - Att: 1,956 at North Hobart Oval (9 May)
- Nth Hobart 17.19 (121) v Sandy Bay 6.10 (46) - Att: 1,021 at Queenborough Oval (9 May)
- Nth Launceston 25.16 (166) v New Norfolk 12.11 (83) - Att: 1,232 at York Park (9 May)
- Devonport 16.23 (119) v Burnie Hawks 8.12 (60) - Att: 1,144 at West Park Oval (9 May)

=== Round 6 ===
(Saturday, 16 May 1992)

- Nth Hobart 25.7 (157) v Burnie Hawks 9.13 (67) - Att: 1,216 at North Hobart Oval
- Sth Launceston 15.7 (97) v Clarence 13.8 (86) - Att: 1,180 at Bellerive Oval
- New Norfolk 16.18 (114) v Sandy Bay 9.10 (64) - Att: 1,570 at Boyer Oval
- Nth Launceston 22.20 (152) v Glenorchy 5.11 (41) - Att: 1,193 at York Park
- Hobart 18.21 (129) v Devonport 10.12 (72) - Att: 1,490 at Devonport Oval

=== Round 7 ===
(Saturday, 23 May 1992)

- Hobart 20.13 (133) v Nth Hobart 15.9 (99) - Att: 2,536 at North Hobart Oval
- Nth Launceston 14.14 (98) v Sandy Bay 8.10 (58) - Att: 652 at Queenborough Oval
- Clarence 15.18 (108) v Glenorchy 9.7 (61) - Att: 1,541 at KGV Football Park
- Devonport 23.14 (152) v Sth Launceston 8.15 (63) - Att: 1,165 at Youngtown Memorial Ground
- New Norfolk 18.25 (133) v Burnie Hawks 12.11 (83) - Att: 876 at West Park Oval

=== Round 8 ===
(Saturday, 30 May 1992)

- Nth Hobart 32.16 (208) v Sth Launceston 13.11 (89) - Att: 1,145 at North Hobart Oval
- Sandy Bay 20.9 (129) v Glenorchy 15.15 (105) - Att: 1,031 at Queenborough Oval
- Hobart 22.14 (146) v New Norfolk 10.13 (73) - Att: 1,743 at Boyer Oval
- Nth Launceston 23.8 (146) v Burnie Hawks 11.10 (76) - Att: 1,087 at York Park
- Devonport 12.13 (85) v Clarence 12.11 (83) - Att: 1,394 at Devonport Oval

=== Round 9 ===
(Saturday, 6 June. Sunday, 7 June & Monday, 8 June 1992)

- Devonport 13.21 (99) v Glenorchy 11.11 (77) - Att: 989 at KGV Football Park
- Burnie Hawks 20.17 (137) v Sandy Bay 12.4 (76) - Att: 762 at West Park Oval
- Nth Launceston 24.11 (155) v Hobart 16.15 (111) - Att: 2,853 at North Hobart Oval (Sunday)
- Nth Hobart 15.22 (112) v Clarence 9.12 (66) - Att: 1,881 at Bellerive Oval (Monday)
- Sth Launceston 17.7 (109) v New Norfolk 10.20 (80) - Att: 872 at Youngtown Memorial Ground (Monday)

=== Round 10 ===
(Saturday, 20 June 1992)

- Hobart 16.13 (109) v Sandy Bay 15.13 (103) - Att: 1,069 at North Hobart Oval
- Glenorchy 18.10 (118) v Burnie Hawks 13.14 (92) - Att: 798 at KGV Football Park
- New Norfolk 15.15 (105) v Clarence 14.16 (100) - Att: 1,216 at Bellerive Oval
- Nth Launceston 20.11 (131) v Sth Launceston 10.10 (70) - Att: 1,246 at Youngtown Memorial Ground
- Nth Hobart 16.9 (105) v Devonport 16.7 (103) - Att: 1,291 at Devonport Oval

=== Round 11 ===
(Saturday, 27 June 1992)

- Nth Hobart 24.16 (160) v Glenorchy 10.11 (71) - Att: 1,399 at North Hobart Oval
- Sandy Bay 16.17 (113) v Sth Launceston 5.6 (36) - Att: 657 at Queenborough Oval
- New Norfolk 23.15 (153) v Devonport 7.5 (47) - Att: 1,295 at Boyer Oval
- Clarence 18.15 (123) v Nth Launceston 16.13 (109) - Att: 1,049 at York Park
- Hobart 19.22 (136) v Burnie Hawks 20.11 (131) - Att: 746 at West Park Oval

=== Round 12 ===
(Saturday, 4 July & Sunday 5 July 1992)

- Nth Hobart 20.9 (129) v New Norfolk 6.10 (46) - Att: 1,786 at North Hobart Oval
- Hobart 16.12 (108) v Glenorchy 10.11 (71) - Att: 1,235 at KGV Football Park
- Clarence 18.21 (129) v Sandy Bay 7.15 (57) - Att: 1,166 at Bellerive Oval
- Sth Launceston 13.12 (90) v Burnie Hawks 9.6 (60) - Att: 581 at Youngtown Memorial Ground
- Nth Launceston 6.7 (43) v Devonport 5.9 (39) - Att: 1,430 at Devonport Oval (Sunday)

=== Round 13 ===
(Saturday, 11 July & Saturday, 18 July 1992)

- Nth Hobart 22.8 (140) v Nth Launceston 11.7 (73) - Att: 1,575 at York Park (11 July)
- Sth Launceston 15.24 (114) v Hobart 14.12 (96) - Att: 937 at North Hobart Oval (18 July)
- Devonport 18.12 (120) v Sandy Bay 13.7 (85) - Att: 540 at Queenborough Oval (18 July)
- New Norfolk 25.14 (164) v Glenorchy 5.7 (37) - Att: 1,481 at Boyer Oval (18 July)
- Clarence 17.19 (121) v Burnie Hawks 10.6 (66) - Att: 604 at West Park Oval (18 July)

=== Round 14 ===
(Saturday, 25 July & Sunday, 26 July 1992)

- Nth Hobart 11.14 (80) v Sandy Bay 1.10 (16) - Att: 814 at North Hobart Oval
- Clarence 9.11 (65) v Hobart 10.5 (65) - Att: 1,125 at Bellerive Oval
- Nth Launceston 4.4 (28) v New Norfolk 2.14 (26) - Att: 830 at Boyer Oval
- Sth Launceston 13.23 (101) v Glenorchy 13.4 (82) - Att: 725 at Youngtown Memorial Ground
- Devonport 23.14 (152) v Burnie Hawks 10.12 (72) - Att: 1,909 at Devonport Oval (Sunday)

=== Round 15 ===
(Saturday, 1 August 1992)

- Hobart 13.14 (92) v Devonport 12.7 (79) - Att: 863 at North Hobart Oval
- Sandy Bay 16.17 (113) v New Norfolk 16.11 (107) - Att: 791 at Queenborough Oval
- Nth Launceston 11.13 (79) v Glenorchy 6.8 (44) - Att: 850 at KGV Football Park
- Clarence 25.16 (166) v Sth Launceston 13.12 (90) - Att: 630 at Youngtown Memorial Ground
- Nth Hobart 18.13 (121) v Burnie Hawks 6.8 (44) - Att: 586 at West Park Oval

=== Round 16 ===
(Saturday, 8 August 1992)

- Nth Hobart 22.18 (150) v Hobart 17.10 (112) - Att: 1,859 at North Hobart Oval
- Clarence 23.13 (151) v Glenorchy 5.11 (41) - Att: 1,196 at Bellerive Oval
- New Norfolk 17.14 (116) v Burnie Hawks 10.9 (69) - Att: 871 at Boyer Oval
- Nth Launceston 15.14 (104) v Sandy Bay 7.10 (52) - Att: 917 at York Park
- Devonport 11.18 (84) v Sth Launceston 6.7 (43) - Att: 1,085 at Devonport Oval

=== Round 17 ===
(Saturday, 15 August 1992)

- Hobart 19.13 (127) v New Norfolk 16.8 (104) - Att: 1,096 at North Hobart Oval
- Glenorchy 14.16 (100) v Sandy Bay 9.12 (66) - Att: 911 at KGV Football Park
- Clarence 13.15 (93) v Devonport 9.16 (70) - Att: 1,080 at Bellerive Oval
- Sth Launceston 24.11 (155) v Nth Hobart 13.15 (93) - Att: 663 at Youngtown Memorial Ground
- Nth Launceston 21.14 (140) v Burnie Hawks 8.10 (58) - Att: 575 at West Park Oval

=== Round 18 ===
(Saturday, 22 August 1992)

- Nth Hobart 17.12 (114) v Clarence 9.14 (68) - Att: 1,914 at North Hobart Oval
- Burnie Hawks 22.12 (144) v Sandy Bay 14.8 (92) - Att: 698 at Queenborough Oval
- New Norfolk 22.18 (150) v Sth Launceston 16.17 (113) - Att: 978 at Boyer Oval
- Nth Launceston 15.9 (99) v Hobart 10.15 (75) - Att: 1,365 at York Park
- Devonport 12.13 (85) v Glenorchy 9.4 (58) - Att: 1,085 at Devonport Oval

=== Qualifying Final ===
(Saturday, 29 August 1992)

- Nth Hobart: 6.3 (39) | 10.4 (64) | 12.11 (83) | 23.12 (150)
- Hobart: 3.2 (20) | 6.4 (40) | 6.8 (44) | 7.11 (53)
- Attendance: 3,088 at North Hobart Oval

=== Elimination Final ===
(Sunday, 30 August 1992)

- Clarence: 3.1 (19) | 6.3 (39) | 8.8 (56) | 9.10 (64)
- Devonport: 2.2 (14) | 3.3 (21) | 5.5 (35) | 6.6 (42)
- Attendance: 1,672 at Devonport Oval

=== Second Semi Final ===
(Saturday, 5 September 1992)

- Nth Hobart: 5.2 (32) | 9.5 (59) | 11.7 (73) | 15.10 (100)
- Nth Launceston: 2.5 (17) | 5.7 (37) | 12.12 (84) | 14.13 (97)
- Attendance: 3,196 at York Park

=== First Semi Final ===
(Sunday, 6 September 1992)

- Hobart: 4.6 (30) | 9.10 (64) | 13.16 (94) | 18.21 (129)
- Clarence: 5.2 (32) | 7.4 (46) | 12.5 (77) | 14.8 (92)
- Attendance: 2,832 at North Hobart Oval

=== Preliminary Final ===
(Saturday, 12 September 1992)

- Hobart: 0.1 (1) | 3.2 (20) | 4.3 (27) | 5.5 (35)
- Nth Launceston: 2.1 (13) | 2.2 (14) | 2.3 (15) | 3.5 (23)
- Attendance: 1,853 at North Hobart Oval

=== Grand Final ===
(Saturday, 19 September 1992) - (ABC-TV highlights: 1992 TFL Grand Final)

- Nth Hobart: 4.3 (27) | 8.6 (54) | 12.8 (80) | 16.12 (108)
- Hobart: 3.7 (25) | 6.8 (44) | 9.11 (65) | 10.13 (73)
- Attendance: 11,967 at North Hobart Oval

Source: All scores and statistics courtesy of the Hobart Mercury, Launceston Examiner and North West Advocate publications.
