= 1986 TFL Statewide League season =

Season of Australian rules football in Tasmania

- Teams: Clarence Kangaroos; East Launceston Demons; Glenorchy Magpies; Hobart Tigers; New Norfolk Eagles; North Hobart Demons; North Launceston Robins; Sandy Bay Seagulls; South Launceston Bulldogs
- Premiers: Glenorchy
- Minor premiers: Sandy Bay; 9th minor premiership

Attendance
- Matches played: 78
- Total attendance: 145,918 (1,871 per match)

The 1986 TFL Statewide League premiership season was an Australian rules football competition held across Tasmania. It consisted of 18 roster rounds and six finals series matches and ran from April 5 to September 20, 1986.

This season marked the inaugural statewide football competition. The League was known as the Cascade-Boags Statewide League due to a dual commercial naming-rights sponsorship agreement valued at $205,000. The agreement was between Cascade Brewery in Hobart and Boag's Brewery in Launceston.

== Participating Clubs ==
- Clarence District Football Club
- East Launceston Football Club
- Glenorchy District Football Club
- Hobart Football Club
- New Norfolk District Football Club
- North Hobart Football Club
- North Launceston Football Club
- Sandy Bay Football Club
- South Launceston Football Club

=== 1986 TFL Statewide League Club Coaches ===
- Graham Hunnibell (Clarence)
- Richard Spencer (East Launceston/South Launceston)
- Danny Ling (Glenorchy)
- Peter Hudson (Hobart)
- Michael Hunnibell & Hedley Thompson (New Norfolk)
- Darryl Sutton & Colin Tully (Stand-In) (North Hobart)
- Tony "Chang" Young (North Launceston)
- Andy Bennett (Sandy Bay)

=== Midas Mufflers League (TANFL Reserves) Grand Final ===
- Glenorchy 17.18 (120) v North Hobart 10.9 (69) - North Hobart Oval

=== Medibank Private League (Under 19's) Grand Final ===
- Glenorchy 17.17 (119) v Clarence 10.8 (68) - North Hobart Oval

=== Leading Goalkickers: TFL Statewide League ===
- Wayne Fox (Hobart) - 105
- Ricky Dolliver (Sandy Bay) - 64
- Scott Adams (Clarence) - 63
- David Pearce (Glenorchy) - 63

=== Medal Winners ===
- Andy Bennett (Sandy Bay) - William Leitch Medal
- Robbie Crane (New Norfolk) - George Watt Medal (Reserves)
- Jason Taylor (New Norfolk) - V.A Geard Medal (Under-19's)
- Simon Sproule (Hobart) - D.R Plaister Medal (Under-17's)

=== Interstate Matches ===
Foster's NFL Shield Match (Sunday, 4 May 1986)

- ACT 19.15 (129) v Tasmania 14.10 (94) - Att: 3,000 at Phillip Oval, Canberra

Foster's NFL Shield Match (Saturday, 10 May 1986)

- Tasmania 28.15 (183) v New South Wales 18.6 (114) - Att: 3,927 at North Hobart Oval

Foster's NFL Shield Match (Saturday, 14 June 1986)

- Tasmania 28.12 (180) v Queensland 9.14 (68) - Att: 4,264 at KGV Football Park

== Season summary ==
In a season of significant change in Tasmanian football, the TANFL took its first steps towards becoming a statewide competition.

The six original TANFL clubs were joined by the North Launceston Robins and the East Launceston Demons from the NTFA.

The season got underway on 5 April with the previous season's grand finalists (Clarence and Glenorchy) doing battle at North Hobart while at KGV Football Park, Richard Spencer's East Launceston confounded the critics after disastrous pre-season form with a sensational 4-point victory over Peter Hudson's Hobart, who were touted by the critics as the big improvers for the season.

East, along with North Launceston and financially crippled New Norfolk (who had debts of $372,000 and who almost went into receivership over the summer) were not expected to challenge for a finals appearance.

Indeed, East Launceston and North Launceston were continuing to field senior teams in both the TFL Statewide League and NTFA competitions until East Launceston merged with fellow NTFA club City-South on 26 May 1986 and the merged club adopted the Bulldogs emblem and colours, playing on for the future as South Launceston.

Round 15 would see the entire round of football postponed due to heavy snowfalls across the state, Hobart receiving its heaviest snowfalls in the city since 1921, this was the first time a TANFL/TFL roster round had been cancelled since 1976.

Throughout the season the Andy Bennett-led Sandy Bay would sweep all before them to take top position on 60 points (15 wins), one game clear of Clarence.

Glenorchy would suffer from injury problems for much of the season but were able to grind out eleven wins to keep them in third spot, while Hobart would suffer from much inconsistency throughout the season, despite strong mid-season form seeing them sitting in the top-four, the Tigers were battered with injuries late in the season themselves and their promising showing amounted to very little as they were comprehensively smashed in their final three matches.

North Hobart, who had been on the cusp of a grand final appearance for the past two seasons had a strong start to the season, but with the hospitalisation and subsequent retirement of captain-coach Darryl Sutton, stand-in coach Colin Tully had much work to do in revitalising a depleted Demon outfit.

Glenorchy, despite losing to lowly New Norfolk in their final roster match would hit form in the second half of the Qualifying final to post a 39-point win over Clarence, the following day North Hobart ran rampant after quarter time to thrash Hobart by 70-points in the Elimination Final and book a date with Clarence at KGV in the First Semi Final, but the Roos held sway in the end after a tight first three-quarters to win by 30-points.

Sandy Bay would win their final twelve roster matches to go into the finals full of confidence in winning their first flag since 1978, the Seagulls ran away from Glenorchy to take the Second Semi Final by 27-points and advance to the Grand Final.

Fierce rivals Glenorchy and Clarence would battle it out in the Preliminary Final, the Magpies doing the damage in the second quarter with six goals to one and continuing on with the job in the second half to win by 42-points.

The Grand Final would be a fiery one, with nine reports (eight of them Sandy Bay players) as Glenorchy unsettled the Seagulls and completely ruffled them, the Magpies would end Sandy Bay's 13-match winning streak in emphatic style, leading at every change to win by 32-points.

The Glenorchy Football Club completed the most dominant season in TFL history by winning the premiership in all grades.

== Expansion Plans ==
In early May, TFL President David Smith met with both Cooee and Burnie Tigers Football Clubs at an open meeting at the Burnie Athletic Club to discuss the possibility of the two clubs amalgamating to form a single entity representing the then township of Burnie (it gained City status in 1988), joining their coastal cousin Devonport, who had already been accepted into the competition for 1987.

The general consensus of the meeting was that neither club were keen to merge with each other and accordingly, both sets of members voted against it.

Burnie were not keen to take on Cooee's $100,000 debt in joining the competition, despite countless meetings it was agreed to let both clubs apply to join and eventually, Cooee would change their name, colours and playing jumper to the Burnie Hawks and would be granted a licence to join the competition from 1987, starting an enormous war between the two clubs that would ultimately hold football back in the city for many years after.

Launceston Football Club would also apply to join the competition but were knocked back by the TFL.

== Building for the future ==
The bidding wars were starting between Councils for the right to become the home of TFL football in the future.

Bids were made by Hobart City, Glenorchy, Clarence and Kingborough Councils to build suitable venues to host big TFL matches and other events in the future.

Kingborough Council announced plans to build a $2.8 million facility near Huntingfield if Sandy Bay would relocate to the region, the date for completion was set to be by 1988/89 with a capacity of 13,000.

Glenorchy City Council announced plans to work with the TFL and the TCA in a partnership to fund a $4.3 million redevelopment of KGV Football Park to become the home of Tasmanian football and cricket.

The development would include TV-standard lighting, corporate facilities for both organisations with 60 VIP boxes and a final capacity of 27,500 on completion.

During the season Clarence would play a majority of their home matches at North Hobart Oval owing to the Bellerive Oval being renovated as the main cricket stadium in Hobart and Sandy Bay would return home permanently to Queenborough after playing home games at North Hobart Oval since 1983.

The TFL also tried to force New Norfolk to play its home matches at KGV Football Park due to poor crowds at the dilapidated Boyer Oval, but Eagles fans boycotted the two matches in protest, with crowds of 470 and 610 forcing the TFL to rethink their decision.

Meanwhile, North Hobart Football Club would receive a $30,000 sponsorship from Schweppes as the strong corporate support continued for the League.

== 1986 TFL Statewide League Ladder ==
| Pos | Team | Pld | W | L | D | PF | PA | PP | Pts |
|---|---|---|---|---|---|---|---|---|---|
| 1 | Sandy Bay | 18 | 15 | 3 | 0 | 2479 | 1536 | 161.4 | 60 |
| 2 | Clarence | 18 | 14 | 4 | 0 | 1994 | 1379 | 144.6 | 56 |
| 3 | Glenorchy | 18 | 11 | 7 | 0 | 2034 | 1626 | 125.1 | 44 |
| 4 | Hobart | 18 | 10 | 8 | 0 | 1902 | 2059 | 92.4 | 40 |
| 5 | North Hobart | 18 | 8 | 10 | 0 | 1719 | 1904 | 90.3 | 32 |
| 6 | New Norfolk | 18 | 7 | 11 | 0 | 1565 | 1677 | 93.3 | 28 |
| 7 | North Launceston | 18 | 4 | 14 | 0 | 1593 | 2107 | 75.6 | 16 |
| 8 | East/South Launceston | 18 | 3 | 15 | 0 | 1616 | 2653 | 60.9 | 12 |

=== Round 1 ===
(Saturday, 5 April & Sunday, 6 April 1986)

- Clarence 19.14 (128) v Glenorchy 18.8 (116) - Att: 3,104 at North Hobart Oval
- East Launceston 18.24 (132) v Hobart 19.14 (128) - Att: 922 at KGV Football Park
- Nth Hobart 14.18 (102) v New Norfolk 10.17 (77) - Att: 1,263 at Boyer Oval
- Sandy Bay 28.20 (188) v Nth Launceston 16.14 (110) - Att: 1,222 at York Park (Sunday)

=== Round 2 ===
(Saturday, 12 April & Sunday, 13 April 1986)

- Nth Hobart 21.19 (145) v Nth Launceston 12.10 (82) - Att: 1,594 at North Hobart Oval
- Hobart 20.12 (132) v Sandy Bay 15.16 (106) - Att: 1,791 at Queenborough Oval
- Glenorchy 16.13 (109) v New Norfolk 13.14 (92) - Att: 1,577 at KGV Football Park
- Clarence 30.22 (202) v East Launceston 9.16 (70) - Att: 1,343 at York Park (Sunday)

=== Round 3 ===
(Saturday, 19 April & Sunday, 20 April 1986)

- Nth Hobart 24.27 (171) v Hobart 10.16 (76) - Att: 2,803 at North Hobart Oval
- Sandy Bay 27.16 (178) v East Launceston 7.22 (64) - Att: 726 at KGV Football Park
- Clarence 15.12 (102) v New Norfolk 6.12 (48) - Att: 1,186 at Boyer Oval
- Glenorchy 19.17 (131) v Nth Launceston 15.4 (94) - Att: 871 at NTCA Ground (Sunday)

=== Round 4 ===
(Friday, 25 April & Saturday, 26 April 1986)

- Hobart 17.6 (108) v Glenorchy 11.20 (86) - Att: 2,258 at KGV Football Park (Friday)
- Clarence 23.14 (152) v Nth Launceston 4.10 (34) - Att: 1,322 at North Hobart Oval
- Sandy Bay 19.15 (129) v Nth Hobart 14.18 (102) - Att: 1,829 at Queenborough Oval
- New Norfolk 16.11 (107) v East Launceston 14.12 (96) - Att: 629 at York Park

=== Round 5 ===
(Saturday, 3 May & Sunday, 4 May 1986)

- Clarence 24.19 (163) v Hobart 7.16 (58) - Att: 1,992 at North Hobart Oval
- Glenorchy 22.18 (150) v Sandy Bay 20.17 (137) - Att: 1,741 at Queenborough Oval
- Nth Hobart 13.22 (100) v East Launceston 13.21 (99) - Att: 877 at KGV Football Park
- Nth Launceston 14.19 (103) v New Norfolk 10.6 (66) - Att: 651 at York Park (Sunday)

=== Round 6 ===
(Saturday, 17 May & Sunday, 18 May 1986)

- Clarence 7.12 (54) v Sandy Bay 7.11 (53) - Att: 1,405 at North Hobart Oval
- Glenorchy 23.12 (150) v Nth Hobart 4.4 (28) - Att: 1,218 at KGV Football Park
- New Norfolk 11.14 (80) v Hobart 3.4 (22) - Att: 647 at Boyer Oval
- East Launceston 19.12 (126) v Nth Launceston 17.14 (116) - Att: 857 at York Park (Sunday)

=== Round 7 ===
(Saturday, 24 May & Sunday, 25 May 1986)

- Nth Hobart 17.13 (115) v Clarence 14.20 (104) - Att: 2,351 at North Hobart Oval
- Hobart 16.10 (106) v Nth Launceston 11.15 (81) - Att: 692 at KGV Football Park
- Sandy Bay 12.16 (88) v New Norfolk 9.11 (65) - Att: 1,137 at Boyer Oval
- Glenorchy 24.25 (169) v East Launceston 9.16 (70) - Att: 1,003 at York Park (Sunday) *

Note: East Launceston (founded in 1948) plays its final game, merging with City-South the following day.

=== Round 8 ===
(Saturday, 31 May & Sunday, 1 June 1986)

- Nth Hobart 12.7 (79) v New Norfolk 10.13 (73) - Att: 1,581 at North Hobart Oval
- Sandy Bay 26.15 (171) v Nth Launceston 17.13 (115) - Att: 992 at Queenborough Oval
- Clarence 15.15 (105) v Glenorchy 12.15 (87) - Att: 3,049 at KGV Football Park
- Hobart 26.11 (167) v Sth Launceston 16.15 (111) - Att: 1,054 at York Park (Sunday) *

Note: First game of South Launceston Football Club after merger of East Launceston & City-South Football Clubs.

=== Round 9 ===
(Saturday, 7 June, Sunday, 8 June & Monday, 9 June 1986)

- Clarence 24.27 (171) v Sth Launceston 4.11 (35) - Att: 2,612 at KGV Football Park (Double-Header)
- Glenorchy 16.16 (112) v New Norfolk 6.20 (56) - Att: 2,612 at KGV Football Park (Double-Header)
- Nth Hobart 14.10 (94) v Nth Launceston 12.12 (84) - Att: 1,034 at NTCA Ground (Sunday)
- Sandy Bay 12.20 (92) v Hobart 12.18 (90) - Att: 1,946 at North Hobart Oval (Monday)

=== Round 10 ===
(Saturday, 21 June & Sunday, 22 June 1986)

- Hobart 20.14 (134) v Nth Hobart 13.17 (95) - Att: 1,883 at North Hobart Oval
- Glenorchy 9.19 (73) v Nth Launceston 8.14 (62) - Att: 1,152 at KGV Football Park
- Clarence 12.10 (82) v New Norfolk 9.11 (65) - Att: 994 at Boyer Oval
- Sandy Bay 24.26 (170) v Sth Launceston 9.12 (66) - Att: 634 at NTCA Ground (Sunday)

=== Round 11 ===
(Saturday, 28 June & Sunday 29 June 1986)

- Hobart 17.12 (114) v Glenorchy 16.17 (113) - Att: 2,081 at North Hobart Oval
- Sandy Bay 25.19 (169) v Nth Hobart 13.16 (94) - Att: 1,493 at Queenborough Oval
- New Norfolk 25.21 (171) v Sth Launceston 15.11 (101) - Att: 470 at KGV Football Park
- Nth Launceston 14.11 (95) v Clarence 13.14 (92) - Att: 718 at York Park (Sunday)

=== Round 12 ===
(Saturday, 5 July & Sunday, 6 July 1986)

- Sandy Bay 20.19 (139) v Glenorchy 9.11 (65) - Att: 2,210 at North Hobart Oval
- New Norfolk 13.14 (92) v Nth Launceston 10.10 (70) - Att: 610 at KGV Football Park
- Clarence 14.15 (99) v Hobart 12.7 (79) - Att: 3,562 at Bellerive Oval
- Sth Launceston 16.12 (108) v Nth Hobart 11.12 (78) - Att: 715 at York Park (Sunday)

=== Round 13 ===
(Saturday, 12 July & Sunday, 13 July 1986)

- Glenorchy 17.17 (119) v Nth Hobart 14.15 (99) - Att: 4,366 at North Hobart Oval (Double-Header)
- Sandy Bay 20.19 (139) v Clarence 13.10 (88) - Att: 4,366 at North Hobart Oval (Double-Header)
- Hobart 14.14 (98) v New Norfolk 12.15 (87) - Att: 1,072 at KGV Football Park
- Nth Launceston 15.22 (112) v Sth Launceston 11.9 (75) - Att: 954 at York Park (Sunday)

=== Round 14 ===
(Saturday, 19 July 1986)

- Nth Hobart 13.18 (96) v Clarence 9.14 (68) - Att: 1,816 at North Hobart Oval
- Sandy Bay 17.16 (118) v New Norfolk 6.10 (46) - Att: 1,081 at Queenborough Oval
- Glenorchy 14.23 (107) v Sth Launceston 12.16 (88) - Att: 933 at KGV Football Park
- Hobart 24.22 (166) v Nth Launceston 17.11 (113) - Att: 852 at York Park

=== Round 15 ===
(Saturday, 2 August & Sunday, 3 August 1986)

- Hobart 27.20 (182) v Sth Launceston 15.12 (102) - Att: 792 at North Hobart Oval
- Clarence 15.7 (97) v Glenorchy 13.17 (95) - Att: 2,070 at KGV Football Park
- New Norfolk 16.15 (111) v Nth Hobart 11.8 (74) - Att: 1,119 at Boyer Oval
- Sandy Bay 26.16 (172) v Nth Launceston 14.13 (97) - Att: 762 at York Park (Sunday)

Note: This round was postponed by one week on 26 July due to heavy snowfalls across Tasmania.

=== Round 16 ===
(Saturday, 9 August & Sunday, 10 August 1986)

- Hobart 19.9 (123) v Nth Hobart 15.15 (105) - Att: 2,023 at North Hobart Oval
- Sandy Bay 24.22 (166) v Sth Launceston 8.16 (64) - Att: 615 at KGV Football Park
- Clarence 16.10 (106) v New Norfolk 11.12 (78) - Att: 1,382 at Boyer Oval
- Glenorchy 17.17 (119) v Nth Launceston 11.13 (79) - Att: 649 at York Park (Sunday)

=== Round 17 ===
(Saturday, 16 August & Sunday, 17 August 1986)

- Sandy Bay 12.18 (90) v Nth Hobart 8.12 (60) - Att: 1,304 at North Hobart Oval
- Glenorchy 21.23 (149) v Hobart 6.7 (43) - Att: 1,980 at KGV Football Park
- Clarence 8.7 (55) v Nth Launceston 5.8 (38) - Att: 1,057 at Bellerive Oval
- New Norfolk 27.22 (184) v Sth Launceston 19.17 (131) - Att: 624 at York Park (Sunday)

=== Round 18 ===
(Saturday, 23 August & Sunday, 24 August 1986)

- Nth Launceston 15.16 (106) v Nth Hobart 11.16 (82) - Att: 1,056 at North Hobart Oval
- Sandy Bay 25.24 (174) v Hobart 11.8 (74) - Att: 1,582 at Queenborough Oval
- New Norfolk 13.9 (87) v Glenorchy 12.12 (84) - Att: 1,335 at KGV Football Park
- Clarence 18.18 (126) v Sth Launceston 10.18 (78) - Att: 686 at York Park (Sunday)

=== Qualifying Final ===
(Saturday, 30 August 1986)

- Glenorchy: 3.2 (20) | 6.7 (43) | 11.14 (80) | 17.18 (120)
- Clarence: 5.3 (33) | 8.7 (55) | 10.8 (68) | 12.9 (81)
- Attendance: 4,856 at North Hobart Oval

=== Elimination Final ===
(Sunday, 31 August 1986)

- Nth Hobart: 4.4 (28) | 13.5 (83) | 20.11 (131) | 27.15 (177)
- Hobart: 3.7 (25) | 7.8 (50) | 9.12 (66) | 15.17 (107)
- Attendance: 3,800 at North Hobart Oval

=== Second Semi Final ===
(Saturday, 6 September 1986)

- Sandy Bay: 3.6 (24) | 9.12 (66) | 12.14 (86) | 17.16 (118)
- Glenorchy: 6.0 (36) | 9.2 (56) | 12.5 (77) | 14.7 (91)
- Attendance: 4,545 at North Hobart Oval

=== First Semi Final ===
(Sunday, 7 September 1986)

- Clarence: 4.10 (34) | 7.11 (53) | 12.18 (90) | 18.22 (130)
- Nth Hobart: 3.4 (22) | 7.6 (48) | 13.8 (86) | 15.10 (100)
- Attendance: 4,439 at KGV Football Park

=== Preliminary Final ===
(Saturday, 13 September 1986)

- Glenorchy: 3.3 (21) | 9.9 (63) | 13.11 (89) | 18.18 (126)
- Clarence: 5.3 (33) | 6.4 (40) | 10.9 (69) | 12.12 (84)
- Attendance: 7,278 at North Hobart Oval

=== Grand Final ===
(Saturday, 20 September 1986) - (ABC-TV highlights: 1986 TFL Grand Final)

- Glenorchy: 4.3 (27) | 6.9 (45) | 11.15 (81) | 14.20 (104)
- Sandy Bay: 0.4 (4) | 2.9 (21) | 5.12 (42) | 9.18 (72)
- Attendance: 16,111 at North Hobart Oval
