= David Code =

Australian rules footballer

Personal information
- Full name: David Code
- Born: 6 April 1957 (age 69)
- Original team: Old Haileybury Football Club
- Height: 184 cm (6 ft 0 in)
- Weight: 83 kg (183 lb)

Playing career^{1}
Years	Club	Games (Goals)
1978	Melbourne	6 (1)
- ^{1} Playing statistics correct to the end of 1978.

David Code (born 6 April 1957) is a former Australian rules footballer who played for Melbourne in the Victorian Football League (VFL).

An Old Haileyburian, Code spent just one season at Melbourne. He later played with Devonport in the TFL Statewide League and won the 1987 William Leitch Medal and was a member of their premiership team the following season. He is also a dual Morrison Medalist with Shepparton Football Club in the Goulburn Valley Football Netball League
