= Shane Fell =

Australian rules footballer

Personal information
- Full name: Shane Fell
- Born: 29 September 1967 (age 59)
- Original team: Kingsville /Footscray Under 19s
- Height: 186 cm (6 ft 1 in)
- Weight: 91 kg (201 lb)
- Position: Full-forward

Playing career^{1}
Years	Club	Games (Goals)
1990	Sydney	15 (30)
- ^{1} Playing statistics correct to the end of 1990.

Shane Fell (born 29 September 1967) is a former Australian rules footballer who played for Sydney in the Australian Football League (AFL).

A forward, Fell played his early football at Kingsville Football Club now Yarraville Seddon and Footscray Under 19s then Glenorchy and was the TFL Statewide League's leading goal-kicker in 1989 with 114 goals before opting to ply his trade on the mainland.

Fell was initially recruited to Geelong but they offloaded him to Sydney in the 1989 VFL draft. He was one of four Sydney player to make their debut in the opening round of the 1990 AFL season, one of which was future Brownlow winner Paul Kelly. The forward kicked five goals to equal the club record of most goals by a player in their first game with the club. He finished the year with 30 goals, his tally including a six-goal haul against Geelong at the SCG.
