= Ian Paton (footballer) =

Australian rules footballer

Personal information
- Born: 21 February 1957 (age 69)
- Original team: Scotch College, Launceston
- Height: 193 cm (6 ft 4 in)
- Weight: 92 kg (203 lb)

Playing career^{1}
Years	Club	Games (Goals)
1976–1985	Hawthorn	155 (47)
- ^{1} Playing statistics correct to the end of 1985.

Ian Paton (born 21 February 1957) is a former Australian rules footballer who played with Hawthorn in the VFL.

Paton played the first half of his career as the second ruckman to Don Scott and it was in that capacity that he was part a member of Hawthorn's premiership winning side in 1978, starting the game in the back pocket. By the 1983 Grand Final, Scott had left and Paton was the first ruck, earning his second premiership. He would soon be relegated again though with the arrival of Greg Dear and he spent the 1986 season as captain of the Hawthorn reserves before returning to his native Tasmania the following year. As captain-coach of South Launceston he won three best and fairest awards.
