= Wayne Fox =

Australian rules footballer (born 1959)

Personal information
- Full name: Wayne Fox
- Nickname: Baldy
- Born: 4 January 1959 (age 67)
- Height: 185 cm (6 ft 1 in)
- Weight: 76 kg (168 lb)
- Position: Forward

Playing career^{1}
Years	Club	Games (Goals)
1975–1977	Glenorchy	
1978	Footscray	1 (0)
1979–1980	Glenorchy	
1981–1985	New Norfolk	
1986–1989	Hobart	
1990	South Launceston	
1990–1991	Sandy Bay	
- ^{1} Playing statistics correct to the end of 1991.

Wayne "Baldy" Fox (born 4 January 1959) is a former Australian rules footballer who played for various clubs in the Tasmanian Australian National Football League (TANFL) and later, the TFL Statewide League. He also played with Footscray in the Victorian Football League (VFL).

== Career ==
A forward, Fox was the all-time record Tasmanian Football League goal-kicker with 1049 goals and started his career at Glenorchy in 1975, before crossing to New Norfolk in 1981.

He was most prolific when playing at New Norfolk, where he topped the TANFL/TFL Statewide league goal-kicking in four successive years from 1983 to 1986. The best of those tallies, 135 goals, came in 1983, and the previous season he was a member of New Norfolk's premiership team.

He crossed to Hobart in 1986 where he also had four fine seasons and also topped the league's goal-kicking in 1986. 1987 and 1988, becoming the Hobart Football Club's only centurion goal-kicker in its history in 1986 and 1988.

Fox booted 97 goals in the 1989 season, including six in the Tigers grand final loss to North Hobart to leave him an agonising three goals short of the ton.

After a dispute with Hobart captain-coach Mark Browning over the summer, Fox walked out on Hobart and joined then bottom club South Launceston for the 1990 season.

A brief foray that only lasted until mid-season before he returned South again and signed up with the Sandy Bay Football Club where he played until his retirement from TFL football in 1991.

Fox brought up his 1000th TFL goal at KGV Football Park on 18 August 1990, in the TFL Statewide League Round 20 clash while playing for Sandy Bay in their 67-point victory over his former club, Glenorchy.

His brief foray into VFL football only yielded one match, with an appearance in the backline for Footscray in the eighth round of the 1978 VFL season at Western Oval, in a four-point loss to Collingwood.

After retirement from TFL football, Fox played in the Huon Football Association, with Huonville, Kingston (Kingborough) and Franklin. His final season of football was for Southern Football League club Claremont, which was coached by his brother Graham in 1998. Fox's final match was against his former club Hobart, at the TCA Ground in front of just 165 spectators. A four-goal tally helped his side to victory and brought an end to a 24-year senior career which spanned 10 clubs.

== Honors and awards ==
Fox was inducted into the Tasmanian Football Hall of Fame in 2007. He kicked a TFL/TANFL record of 1049 goals, having passed Peter Hudson's tally of 994 goals late in his career. In addition, Fox also kicked 85 goals in interstate matches for Tasmania and 19 goals when representing the TANFL against the NWFU.
