= List of Australian rules footballers and cricketers =

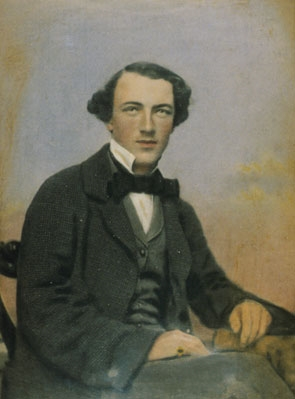
Tom Wills, champion cricketer and co-founder of Australian rules football

This is a listing of players to have played both Australian rules football in the nation's premier leagues and first-class cricket or higher. These leagues are the Australian Football League (AFL) (formerly the VFL), AFL Women's (AFLW), West Australian Football League (WAFL) and South Australian National Football League (SANFL). First-class cricketers who played football in other states are eligible if they had a notable career in that state's top league.

In the early years of the VFL it was quite common for footballers to play district cricket over the summer months, some of them even made their state sides and others represented Australia. Likewise cricketers would often play football in the off season to keep fit and if good enough would appear in their state's best league.

Players are divided into the lists below by which state they spent the majority of their sporting career or in come cases their state or origin.

== International cricketers who played interstate football ==
Name	Australian rules football			International cricket	
Name	Club(s)	Career	Ref	Format(s)	Career
George Coulthard	Carlton Football Club	1876–1882		Test cricket	1882
Jess Duffin	Collingwood Football Club; North Melbourne Football Club; Hawthorn Football Club	2017–2022		Women's Test cricket; Women's One Day International; Women's Twenty20 International	2008/09–2015
Eric Freeman	Port Adelaide Football Club	1964–1971		Test cricket	1967/68–1969/70
Neil Hawke	Port Adelaide Football Club; East Perth Football Club; West Torrens Football Club	1956–1966		Test cricket	1962/63–1968
Clem Hill	South Adelaide Football Club	1890s–1900s		Test cricket	1894/95–1902/03
Ernie Jones	South Adelaide Football Club; North Adelaide Football Club; Port Adelaide Football Club	1894–1901		Test cricket	1892/93–1907/08
Gil Langley	Sturt Football Club; Essendon Football Club	1939–1950		Test cricket	1951/52–1956/57
Phil Lee	Norwood Football Club	1923–1929		Test cricket	1931/32–1932/33
Keith Miller	St Kilda Football Club	1939–1946		Test cricket	1945/46–1956/57
Laurie Nash	South Melbourne Football Club (both player and coach)	1930–1945		Test cricket	1931/32–1936/37
John Reedman	South Adelaide Football Club; North Adelaide Football Club	1889–1909		Test cricket	1894
Vic Richardson	Sturt Football Club	1915–1927		Test cricket	1924/25–1935/36
Keith Slater	Swan Districts Football Club; Subiaco Football Club	1955–1963		Test cricket	1958/59
David Smith	Essendon Football Club	1903–1914		Test cricket	1912

== International cricketers who played league football ==
Name	Australian rules football			International cricket	
Name	Club(s)	Career	Ref	Format(s)	Career
Frank Allan	South Melbourne Football Club	1867–1870s		Test cricket	1879
Warwick Armstrong	South Melbourne Football Club	1898–1900		Test cricket	1901/02–1921
Barlow Carkeek	Essendon Football Club	1903–1905		Test cricket	1912
Joe Darling	Norwood Football Club	1894–1895		Test cricket	1894/95–1905
Algy Gehrs	South Adelaide Football Club; North Adelaide Football Club	1902–1908		Test cricket	1903/04–1910/11
George Giffen	Norwood Football Club	1878–1885		Test cricket	1881/82–1896
Harry Graham	Melbourne Football Club	1900		Test cricket	1893–1896
Albert Hartkopf	Melbourne University Football Club	1908–1914		Test cricket	1924/25
Des Hoare	East Fremantle Football Club	1950s		Test cricket	1960/61
Delissa Kimmince	Brisbane Lions	2017		Women's One Day International; Women's Twenty20 International	2007/08–2020/21
Sam Loxton	St Kilda Football Club	1942–1946		Test cricket	1947/48–1950/51
Mick Malone	Subiaco Football Club	1970s		Test cricket; One Day International	1977–1981/82
Geoff Marsh	South Fremantle Football Club	1978		Test cricket; One Day International	1985/86–1991/92
Jimmy Matthews	St Kilda Football Club	1907		Test cricket	1911/12–1912
Ted McDonald	Essendon Football Club; Fitzroy Football Club	1912–1919		Test cricket	1920/21–1921/22
Patrick McShane	Fitzroy Football Club	1880s		Test cricket	1884/85
Simon O'Donnell	St Kilda Football Club	1982–1983		Test cricket; One Day International	1984/85–1991/92
Roy Park	University Football Club; Melbourne Football Club	1912–1915		Test cricket	1920/21
Nip Pellew	North Adelaide Football Club	1914		Test cricket	1920/21–1921/22
Jamie Siddons	Sydney Swans	1984		One Day International	1988/89
Joe Travers	Norwood Football Club	1892–1896		Test cricket	1901/02
George Tribe	Footscray Football Club	1940–1946		Test cricket	1946/47
Mervyn Waite	West Torrens Football Club; Glenelg Football Club	1930–1942		Test cricket	1938
Max Walker	Melbourne Football Club	1967–1972		Test cricket; One Day International	1972/73–1980/81
Graeme Watson	Melbourne Football Club	1964–1965		Test cricket; One Day International	1966/67–1972
Graeme Wood	East Fremantle Football Club	1975–1977		Test cricket; One Day International	1977/78–1988/89
Jack Worrall	Fitzroy Football Club	1902–1920		Test cricket	1884/85–1899
Tim Zoehrer	East Fremantle Football Club	1982		Test cricket; One Day International	1985/86–1993/94

== State cricketers who played interstate football ==
=== Queensland ===
Name	Australian rules football			State cricket	
Name	Club(s)	Career	Ref	Team(s)	Career
Aub Carrigan	Windsor Football Club	1940s		Queensland	1945/46–1951/52
Brian O'Connor	South Brisbane Football Club	1930s		Queensland	1934/35–1935/36
Leo O'Connor	Essendon Football Club	1910–1911		Queensland	1912/13–1929/30
Harry Pegg	South Brisbane Football Club; Windsor Football Club; Yeronga Football Club	1930s, 1940s		Queensland	1945/46–1946/47
Leyland Sanders	Coorparoo-Yeronga Football Club; Yeronga Football Club	1940s, 1950s		Queensland	1950/51–1954/55
Cyril Smith	Yeronga Football Club	1940s, 1950s		Queensland	1947/48–1953/54
Donald Watt	Coorparoo Football Club; South Brisbane Football Club	1940s		Queensland	1939/40–1945/46

=== South Australia ===
Name	Australian rules football			State cricket	
Name	Club(s)	Career	Ref	Team(s)	Career
Craig Bradley	Port Adelaide Football Club; Carlton Football Club	1986–2002		South Australia; Victoria	1983/84–1989/90
Jack Chamberlain	Norwood Football Club	1908–1909, 1914		South Australia	1906/07
Norman Claxton	North Adelaide Football Club	1900s		South Australia	1898/99–1909/10
John Halbert	Sturt Football Club	1955–1968		South Australia	1961/62
Lindsay Head	West Torrens Football Club	1952–1970		South Australia	1957/58–1958/59
Eric Johnson	Norwood Football Club	1925–1934		South Australia	1926/27–1929/30
Bill Leak	Sturt Football Club	1939–1946		South Australia	1935/35–1940/41
James Matthews	North Adelaide Football Club	1900–1913		South Australia	1900/01–1901/02
Bob McLean	Norwood Football Club; Port Adelaide Football Club; St Kilda Football Club	1934–1941		South Australia	1945/46–1950/51
Barrie Robran	North Adelaide Football Club	1967–1980		South Australia	1971/72
Alfred Ryan	South Adelaide Football Club	1922–1931		South Australia	1925/26–1936/37
Bruce Schultz	Norwood Football Club	1933–1941		South Australia	1936/37
Bob Simunsen	Woodville Football Club	1964–1971		South Australia	1972/73
Richard Townsend	Norwood Football Club	1904–1920		South Australia	1907/08–1923/24
Alfred Waldron	Norwood Football Club	1879–1892		South Australia	1881/82–1887/88

=== Tasmania ===
Name	Australian rules football			State cricket	
Name	Club(s)	Career	Ref	Team(s)	Career
Jim Atkinson	Fitzroy Football Club	1917–1925		Victoria; Tasmania	1921/22–1933/34
Darrel Baldock	St Kilda Football Club	1962–1968		Tasmania	1960/61
Rex Garwood	New Town Football Club; New Norfolk Football Club	1950–1960		Tasmania	1952/53–1955/56
Garney Goodrick	Carlton Football Club	1923–1925		Tasmania	1922/23
Geoffrey Martin	Launceston Football Club	1946-1954		Tasmania	1950/51
Stanley McKenzie	Carlton Football Club	1914		Tasmania	1909/10–1912/13
Ray Stokes	Richmond Football Club	1946–1951		Tasmania	1952/53–1965/66
George Vautin	Essendon Football Club; City (Hobart)	1897–1898		Tasmania; Victoria	1894/95–1889/90

=== Victoria ===
Name	Australian rules football			State cricket	
Name	Team(s)	Career	Ref	Team(s)	Career
Allen Aylett	North Melbourne Football Club	1952–1964		Victoria	1957/58–1958/59
Charles Baker	St Kilda Football Club	1902–1906		Victoria	1903/04–1904/05
Fred Baring	Essendon Football Club	1910–1924		Victoria	1911/12–1928/29
Percy Beames	Melbourne Football Club	1931–1944		Victoria	1933/34–1945/46
Peter Bedford	South Melbourne Football Club; Carlton Football Club	1968–1978		Victoria	1966/67–1972/73
Des Fothergill	Collingwood Football Club	1937–1940, 1945–1947		Victoria	1938/39–1948/49
Emma Kearney	Collingwood Football Club; North Melbourne Football Club	2017–present		Victoria	2013/14–2016/17
Chris Kiernan	Fitzroy Football Club	1897–1901, 1903, 1911		Victoria	1909/10–1918/19
Ian Law	Hawthorn Football Club	1960–1968		Victoria	1961/62–1963/64
Ernest McIntyre	St Kilda Football Club; Collingwood Football Club	1940–1949		Victoria	1946/47
Keith Millar	Richmond Football Club	1924–1927, 1930		Victoria	1924/25–1932/33
Bill Sewart	Essendon Football Club	1905–1915		Queensland; Victoria	1908–1919
Paddy Shea	Fitzroy Football Club; Essendon Football Club	1904, 1908–1915, 1918		Victoria	1912/13–1919/20
George Stuckey	Essendon Football Club	1897–1902		Victoria	1894/95–1902/03

=== Western Australia ===
Name	Australian rules football			State cricket	
Name	Club(s)	Career	Ref	Team(s)	Career
Todd Breman	Subiaco Football Club; Richmond Football Club; West Coast Eagles	1987–1993		Western Australia	1985/86–1987/88
Fred Buttsworth	Essendon Football Club; West Perth Football Club	1942–1953		Western Australia	1947/48–1949/50
Wally Buttsworth	Essendon Football Club; West Perth Football Club	1935–late 1940s		Western Australia	1937/38
Derek Chadwick	East Perth Football Club	1959–1972		Western Australia	1963/64–1971/72
Michael Clark	Fremantle Football Club; Swan Districts Football Club	1996–1999		Western Australia; Warwickshire	2000/01–
Jim Ditchburn	Subiaco Football Club; South Fremantle Football Club; Swan Districts Football Club	1929–1939		Western Australia	1933/34–1935/36
Ron Doig, Sr.	South Fremantle Football Club	1927–1932		Western Australia	1926/27–1931/32
Bruce Duperouzel	Claremont Football Club; St Kilda Football Club	1969–1984		Western Australia	1971/72–1972/73
Allan Evans	Perth Football Club	1917–1929		Western Australia	1921/22–1931/32
Jim Everett	West Perth Football Club	1901–1915		Western Australia	1909/10
Bert Harrold	East Perth Football Club	1916–25, 1932		Western Australia	1925/26
Dolph Heinrichs	East Fremantle Football Club; North Fremantle Football Club	1899–1906		Western Australia	1922/23
Carlisle Jarvis	East Fremantle Football Club	1920s, 1930s		Western Australia	1932/33
Harvey Kelly	East Fremantle Football Club; South Fremantle Football Club	1903–1906		Western Australia	1905/06
Ken McAullay	East Perth Football Club	Late 1960s–1975		Western Australia	1970/71–1973/74
George Moysey	Melbourne Football Club; Perth Football Club; Subiaco Football Club	1890s–1900s		Western Australia	1970/71–1973/74
Tom Mullooly	Swan Districts Football Club	1971–1986		Western Australia	1976/77
John Munro	Claremont Football Club	1950s		Western Australia	1948/49–1954/55
Alan Preen	East Fremantle Football Club	1953–1959		Western Australia	1953/54–1956/57
Harry Price	Claremont Football Club	1940s, 1950s		Western Australia	1949/50–1955/56
Alex Robinson	Essendon Football Club	1904		Western Australia	1907/08
Earl Spalding	Perth Football Club; Melbourne Football Club; Carlton Football Club; East Fremantle Football Club	1983–1999		Western Australia	1984/85
William Truscott	East Fremantle Football Club	1910s, 1920s		Western Australia	1929/30
George Young	St Kilda Football Club; Subiaco Football Club	1973–1978		Western Australia	1972/73

== First-class cricketers who played league football ==
=== Australian Capital Territory ===
Name	Australian rules football			FC cricket	
Name	Club(s)	Career	Ref	Team(s)	Career
Jodie Hicks	Greater Western Sydney Giants	2018–present		ACT	2014/15–2016/17

=== South Australia ===
Name	Australian rules football			FC cricket	
Name	Team(s)	Career	Ref	Team(s)	Career
Cornelius Chamberlain	Norwood Football Club	1907–1908		South Australia	1905/06–1910/11
Leonard Chamberlain	Norwood Football Club	1907–1914		South Australia	1907/08–1913/14
Mick Clingly	West Torrens Football Club	1951–1959		South Australia	1957/58–1959/60
Neil Dansie	Norwood Football Club	1946–1949		South Australia	1949/50–1966/67
Alan Dowding	Sturt Football Club	1940s		Oxford; Marylebone Cricket Club	1951–1956
Alby Green	Norwood Football Club	1893–1899		South Australia	1894/95–1898/99
Gordon Gurr	Sturt Football Club	1902–1907		South Australia	1905/06
Les Hill	Norwood Football Club	1903–1910		South Australia	1905/06–1910/11
Norman Jolly	Norwood Football Club; Sturt Football Club	1900s		Worcestershire	1907
Bob Lee	West Adelaide Football Club	1945–1957		South Australia	1956/57–1959/60
John Lill	Norwood Football Club	1959–1962		South Australia	1955/56–1965/66
Phil Newland	Norwood Football Club	1900–1907		South Australia	1899/1900–1905/06
Brittany Perry	Greater Western Sydney Giants; Gold Coast Suns; Port Adelaide Football Club	2019–2022		South Australia	2014/15–2017/18
Katelyn Pope	West Coast Eagles; Port Adelaide Football Club	2021–present		South Australia	2014/15–2018/19
James Pyke	Norwood Football Club	1986–1990		South Australia	1985/86–1987/88
Karl Schneider	Norwood Football Club	1926–1927		Victoria; South Australia	1922/23–1927/28
Libby Waye	West Torrens Football Club; South Adelaide Football Club	1907–1914		South Australia	1912/13
Courtney Webb	Carlton Football Club	2018–2019		Tasmania; South Australia	2017/18–present

=== Tasmania ===
Name	Australian rules football			FC cricket	
Name	Club(s)	Career	Ref	Team(s)	Career
Dale Anderson	Melbourne Football Club	1953–1954		Tasmania	1952/53–1963/4
Ray Biffin	Melbourne Football Club	1968–1979		Tasmania	1967/68
Bill Cahill	Essendon Football Club	1937–1938		Tasmania	1931/32
Colin Campbell	Essendon Football Club	1897–1899		Tasmania	1896/97
Ivor Clay	Fitzroy Football Club	1941–1946		Tasmania	1949/50–1950/51
Mark Colegrave	Hobart Football Club; Clarence Football Club	1990s		Tasmania	2000/01
Garry Cowmeadow	South Melbourne Football Club	1975		Tasmania	1976/77–1978/79
Bert Davie	Geelong Football Club	1917–1919		Tasmania; Victoria	1921/22–1926/27
Barry Harper	City-South (Launceston)	1960s, 1970s		Tasmania	1961/62–1968/69
Brent Palfreyman	Sandy Bay Football Club	1960s, 1970s		Tasmania	1965/66–1972/73
Alan Pearsall	South Melbourne Football Club	1941		Tasmania	1933/34–1938/39
Ted Pickett	City (Launceston)	1928–1938		Tasmania	1928/29–1935/36
Emily Smith	Collingwood Football Club	2022–present		Tasmania; Essex; Western Australia	2013/14–2020/21
Jim Wilkinson	South Melbourne Football Club	1970–1972		Tasmania	1973/74–1974/75

=== Victoria ===
Name	Australian rules football			FC cricket	
Name	Club(s)	Career	Ref	Team(s)	Career
Noel Allanson	Essendon Football Club	1947–1951		Victoria	1956/57
Bill Allen	Melbourne Football Club	1910–1923		Victoria	1914/15
Alfred Andrew-Street	Collingwood Football Club	1933–1934		Victoria	1937/38
Cecil Austen	Hawthorn Football Club	1942		South Australia	1945/46
Jim Baird	Carlton Football Club	1941–1951		Victoria	1948/49–1949/50
Jack Barnes	South Melbourne Football Club	1925–1929		Victoria	1929/30
Thomas Bird	Collingwood Football Club	1925, 1928		Victoria	1928/29
Blair Campbell	Richmond Football Club; Melbourne Football Club	1966, 1968–1969		Tasmania; Victoria	1969/70–1979/80
Frederick Chapman	Fitzroy Football Club	1920–1921		Victoria	1928/29–1930/31
Bernard Considine	Hawthorn Football Club	1952–1953		Tasmania; Victoria	1949/50–1954/55
Russell Cook	South Melbourne Football Club	1966–1975		Victoria	1968/69
John Cordner	Melbourne Football Club	1951		Victoria	1951–1952
Laurence Cordner	Hawthorn Football Club	1933		Victoria; Warwickshire	1930/31–1933/34
Bryan Cosgrave	Fitzroy Football Club	1924		Victoria	1925/26–1931/32
Neil Crompton	Melbourne Football Club	1957–1966		Victoria	1957–62
John Douglas	North Melbourne Football Club	1972, 1975–1976		Victoria	1975/76–1978/79
Harcourt Dowsley	Carlton Football Club	1941		Victoria	1937/38–1946/47
Walter Dudley	Fitzroy Football Club	1940		Victoria	1940/41
Reg Ellis	St Kilda Football Club; Melbourne Football Club	1913–1915, 1920		Victoria	1927/28–1929/30
Michael Fitchett	Hawthorn Football Club	1950–1952		Victoria	1950/51–1952/53
John Francis	Hawthorn Football Club	1926		Victoria	1932/33
Harry Frei	Footscray Football Club	1973		Queensland	1982–1986
Herbert Fry	Melbourne Football Club	1897–1898		Victoria	1896/97–1907/08
Norman Good	Melbourne University Football Club	1909		Western Australia	1909/10
Doug Gott	Collingwood Football Club	1969–1977		Victoria	1973–1974
Herbert Guthrie	St Kilda Football Club	1925		Victoria	1928/29–1929/30
David Hone	Melbourne Football Club	1969		Oxford University	1970
Herb Howson	South Melbourne Football Club	1897–1908		Victoria	1902/03
Nick Jewell	Richmond Football Club	1997		Victoria	2001/02–2006/07
Stuart King	St Kilda Football Club	1931–1933		Victoria	1926/27–1932/33
Bill Kinnear	Essendon Football Club	1936		Victoria	1935/36
Joe Kinnear	Melbourne Football Club	1932–1937		Victoria	1931/32
Alex Keath	Adelaide Football Club; Western Bulldogs	2017–present		Victoria	2010/11–2014/15
Kirsty Lamb	Western Bulldogs	2017–present		Victoria; Staffordshire	2012/13–2016
Harry Lambert	Collingwood Football Club	1941–1947		Victoria; Commonwealth XI	1946/47–1953/54
Thomas Leather	North Melbourne Football Club	1932–1933		Victoria	1933/34–1936/37
Ian Lee	South Melbourne Football Club	1934		Victoria	1931/32–1940/41
Jack Lowry	St Kilda Football Club	1938–1946		Victoria	1937/38
Frank Lugton	Melbourne Football Club	1913–1914		Victoria	1913/14
Richard Maddocks	North Melbourne Football Club	1948		Victoria	1948/49–1956/57
Samuel McMichael	Fitzroy Football Club	1897		Victoria	1891/92–1903/04
Norman Mitchell	St Kilda Football Club	1925		Victoria	1925/26–1926/27
Bruce Murray	South Melbourne Football Club	1951–1954		Victoria	1957/58
Basil Onyons	Melbourne Football Club	1905–1908		Victoria	1918/19–1928/29
Geoff Parker	Essendon Football Club	1987,1989		South Australia; Victoria	1985/86–1998/99
Wil Parker	Collingwood Football Club	2024–present		Victoria	2019/20–2021/22
Joseph Plant	Richmond Football Club	1925		Victoria	1932/33–1936/37
Leslie Rainey	Essendon Football Club; Melbourne Football Club	1899–1903		Victoria	1902/03–1904/05
Keith Rawle	Essendon Football Club	1942–1949		Victoria	1948/49
Howard Richardson	Richmond Football Club; Melbourne Football Club	1915–1919		Victoria	1923/24
Alby Rose	South Melbourne Football Club	1900–1902		Transvaal	1904/05
Robert Rose	Collingwood Football Club; Footscray Football Club	1970–1973		Victoria	1971/72–1973/74
Charles Salvana	Melbourne Football Club	1919		Victoria	1926/27
Mick Schade	Richmond Football Club	1911		Victoria	1921/22
John Scholes	North Melbourne Football Club	1967–1971		Victoria	1968/69–1981/82
Heinrich Schrader	Melbourne University Football Club	1914		Victoria	1929/30–1930/31
David Shepherd	St Kilda Football Club	1976–1977		Victoria	1982/83
Benjamin Sheppard	Melbourne Football Club; Richmond Football Club	1911–1912		Victoria	1913/14
Harold Shillinglaw	Fitzroy Football Club	1945–1951		Victoria	1949/50–1953/54
Keith Stackpole, Sr.	Collingwood Football Club; Fitzroy Football Club	1935–1944		Victoria	1945/46–1949/50
John Stephens	St Kilda Football Club	1971–1973		Victoria	1970/71–1971/72
Les Stillman	Essendon Football Club; Footscray Football Club	1968–1971		Victoria; South Australia	1970–1978
Alan Thomson	St Kilda Football Club	1923–1924		Victoria	1925/26
Herb Turner	Carlton Football Club; Hawthorn Football Club	1944–1950		Victoria	1948/49–1950/51
Les Vernon	Carlton Football Club; South Melbourne Football Club	1898–1901		Victoria	1906/07–1908/09
Bree White	Collingwood Football Club	2017–2018		Victoria	1999/2000–2001/02
Carl Willis	Melbourne University Football Club; South Melbourne Football Club	1912–15, 1920–21		Victoria	1913/14–1928/29
Tom Wills	Melbourne Football Club; Geelong Football Club	1850s–1870s		Kent; Victoria	1854–1875/76
Charles 'Gillie' Wilson	St Kilda Football Club	1897, 1900		Victoria; Otago; Wellington	1894/95–1919/20
William Wilson	Essendon Football Club	1932–1933, 1935		Victoria	1935/36
Stan Wootton	South Melbourne Football Club; Richmond Football Club	1915, 1920–1923		Victoria	1923/24
Harry Wright	Essendon Football Club	1897–1903		Victoria	1900/01–1904/05

=== Western Australia ===
Name	Australian rules football			FC cricket	
Name	Club(s)	Career	Ref	Team(s)	Career
Bill Bateman	Fremantle Football Club; Unions Football Club (later Fremantle)	1880s and 1890s		Western Australia	1892/93
Mervyn Bessen	Subiaco Football Club	1937		Western Australia	1937/38
Ron Bowe	South Fremantle Football Club	1959–1963		Western Australia	1967/68–1968/69
Ian Brayshaw	Claremont Football Club	1960s		Western Australia	1960/61–1977/78
Arnold Byfield	Melbourne Football Club; Claremont Football Club	1940–1947		Western Australia	1952/53–1953/54
Victor Carlson	East Fremantle Football Club	1914–1923		Western Australia	1922/23–1925/26
Kenneth Cumming	Subiaco Football Club	1938–1940, 1947		Western Australia	1945/46–1947/48
Bill Duffy	Rovers Football Club; West Perth Football Club	1880s and 1890s		Western Australia	1892/93
Henry Edmondson	Perth Football Club	1902–1907		Western Australia	1905/06–1912/13
Matt Garnaut	East Perth Football Club	1994		Western Australia	1996/97–1997/98
Percival Hussey	Rovers Football Club	1880s and 1890s		Western Australia	1892/93
Otto Kelly	East Fremantle Football Club; South Fremantle Football Club	1903–1907		Western Australia	1906/07–1907/08
Wally Langdon	Claremont Football Club	1946–1947		Western Australia	1946/47–1955/56
Ossie Lovelock	West Perth Football Club	1932–34		Western Australia	1932/33–1939/40
Frank Meares	East Fremantle Football Club	1899		Western Australia; New South Wales	1898/99–1901/02
Alf Moffat	Victorians Football Club (later West Perth)	1880s and 1890s		Western Australia	1892/93
Paul Nicholls	East Fremantle Football Club	1970s		Western Australia	1971/72–1978/79
Basil Rigg	Perth Football Club	1940s		Western Australia	1947/48–1956/57
Stewart Walters	Swan Districts Football Club	2002		Surrey; Glamorgan	2005–2010 2011–2014
Barney Wood	Melbourne Football Club; Perth Football Club	1928–1930s		Western Australia	1931/32
