= Deaths in November 1992 =

The following is a list of notable deaths in November 1992.

Entries for each day are listed alphabetically by surname. A typical entry lists information in the following sequence:

- Name, age, country of citizenship at birth, subsequent country of citizenship (if applicable), reason for notability, cause of death (if known), and reference.

== November 1992 ==
=== 1 ===
- Harry Baker, 84, Australian rules footballer.
- Giacomo Giuseppe Beltritti, 81, Italian Roman Catholic prelate, Latin Patriarch of Jerusalem (1970–1987).
- Karl Deutsch, 80, Czech political scientist.
- Bob Haak, 76, American football player (Brooklyn Dodgers).
- Tamara Lazakovich, 38, Soviet artistic gymnast and Olympian (1972), alcohol-related illnesses.
- John H. Malmberg, 65, American plasma physicist.
- Marianne Stewart, 70, German-American actress, cancer.
- Hugh Taylor, 69, American football player (Washington Redskins), and coach.
- Doug Turley, 73, American football player (Washington Redskins).

=== 2 ===
- Anvar Arazov, 38, Azerbaijani colonel and war hero, killed in action.
- Robert Carston Arneson, 62, American sculptor, cancer.
- Vincenzo Balzamo, 63, Italian politician, heart attack.
- Umberto Bonadè, 83, Italian Olympic rower (1928).
- Jeremias Chitunda, 50, Angolan politician, assassinated, homicide.
- L. Roy Houck, 87, American rancher and politician.
- Amos Marsh, 53, American football player (Dallas Cowboys, Detroit Lions).
- Hal Roach, 100, American film and television producer (Our Gang, Laurel and Hardy), pneumonia.
- Elmer Gordon West, 77, American district judge.
- Jack Whitney, 87, American sound engineer.

=== 3 ===
- Allah Jilai Bai, 90, Indian folk singer.
- Rhéal Bélisle, 73, Canadian politician, member of the Senate of Canada (1963-).
- Boze Berger, 82, American baseball player (Cleveland Indians, Chicago White Sox, Boston Red Sox).
- Jack Davis, 78, American child actor (Our Gang), respiratory failure.
- Allanah Harper, 87, English journalist.
- Teofil Herineanu, 82, Romanian cleric.
- Haydn Hill, 79, English amateur football player and Olympian (1936).
- Hanya Holm, 99, German-American dancer, choreographer, and dance educator.
- Raimond Kolk, 68, Estonian writer.
- Paul McRae, 68, Canadian politician, member of the House of Commons of Canada (1972-1984).
- Vladas Mikėnas, 82, Lithuanian chess player and journalist.
- Prem Nath, 65, Indian actor and director.
- Chris Van Cuyk, 65, American baseball player (Brooklyn Dodgers).

=== 4 ===
- Raoul André, 76, French director and screenwriter.
- Claude Aveline, 91, French writer, publisher, poet and French Resistance member during World War II.
- Ludwik Benoit, 72, Polish film and theatre actor.
- Regina Carrol, 49, American actress, cancer.
- José Luis Sáenz de Heredia, 81, Spanish film director.
- Carlos Eduardo Imperial, 56, Brazilian actor, myasthenia gravis.
- George Klein, 88, Canadian inventor.
- Csaba Körmöczi, 48, Hungarian Olympic fencer (1976).
- Kuniko Miyake, 76, Japanese actress (Tokyo Story, Late Spring, The Flavor of Green Tea over Rice).
- Luisa Moreno, 85, Guatemalan labor leader.
- Andy Varga, 61, American baseball player (Chicago Cubs).
- Pierre Wissmer, 77, French composer.

=== 5 ===
- Jack Davies, 81, English cricketer.
- Carlos Sanz de Santamaría, 87, Colombian diplomat and politician.
- Arpad Elo, 89, Hungarian-American chess player.
- Dick Hahn, 76, American baseball player (Washington Senators).
- Richard Hartshorne, 92, American geographer and academic.
- Jan Hendrik Oort, 92, Dutch astronomer.
- Carl Rodenburg, 98, Nazi Germany Wehrmacht general.
- Rod Scurry, 36, American baseball player (Pittsburgh Pirates, New York Yankees, Seattle Mariners), cocaine-induced heart attack.
- Vyacheslav Skomorokhov, 52, Ukrainian track and field athlete and Olympian (1968).

=== 6 ===
- Calvin Graham, 62, Youngest American serviceman to serve during World War II.
- Sebastián Gualco, 80, Argentine football player.
- Lev Orekhov, 78, Soviet and Russian painter.
- Mark Rosenberg, 44, American film producer (Presumed Innocent, The Fabulous Baker Boys, White Palace), heart failure.

=== 7 ===
- Alexander Dubček, 70, Slovak politician, traffic accident.
- Fern Gauthier, 73, Canadian ice hockey player (New York Rangers, Montreal Canadiens, Detroit Red Wings).
- René Hamel, 90, French Olympic cyclist (1924).
- Jack Kelly, 65, American actor (Maverick, Forbidden Planet, A Fever in the Blood) and politician, stroke.
- Scott McPherson, 33, American playwright (Marvin's Room), complications from AIDS.
- Robert Nay, 35, Australian swimmer and Olympian (1972), traffic collision.
- Jimmy Oakes, 90, English footballer.
- Henri Temianka, 85, Scottish-American violinist.
- Richard Yates, 66, American novelist (Revolutionary Road), pulmonary emphysema.

=== 8 ===
- Kees Broekman, 65, Dutch Olympic speed skater (1948, 1952, 1956, 1960).
- He Cheng, 90-91, Chinese lieutenant general.
- Ian Griffith, 67, Australian politician.
- Larry Levan, 38, American DJ, stroke.
- Red Mitchell, 65, American jazz musician.
- Felix Schnyder, 82, Swiss lawyer and diplomat.

=== 9 ===
- Fritz Gunst, 84, German Olympic water polo player (1928, 1932, 1936).
- William Hillcourt, 92, Danish scouting pioneer.
- Ivan Holovchenko, 74, Soviet and Ukrainian militsiya general.
- Natalie Joyce, 90, American actress.
- Sven Selånger, 85, Swedish Nordic skier and Olympic medalist (1928, 1932, 1936).
- T. Sivasithamparam, 66, Sri Lankan politician.

=== 10 ===
- Chuck Connors, 71, American actor (The Rifleman, Soylent Green, Old Yeller) and athlete (Brooklyn Dodgers, Chicago Cubs, Boston Celtics), lung cancer.
- Doc Guidry, 74, American fiddler.
- Hilda Hölzl, 65, Slovenian dramatic soprano.
- Anatoly Kamnev, 43, Soviet-Russian Olympic boxer (1972).
- Eskil Lundahl, 87, Swedish swimmer and Olympian (1928, 1932).
- Dan Murray, 79, Australian rules footballer.
- Gustaf Nordahl, 89, Swedish sculptor.
- John Summerson, 87, English architectural historian.

=== 11 ===
- Giles Bullard, 66, British diplomat.
- John Samuel Forrest, 85, Scottish physicist.
- Peter Gretton, 80, English naval admiral.
- Bao Jiaping, 84, Chinese Olympic footballer (1936).
- Earle Meadows, 79, American Olympic pole vaulter (1936).

=== 12 ===
- Giulio Carlo Argan, 83, Italian politician and art historian, mayor of Rome (1976–1979).
- Rafael Asadov, 40, Azerbaijani officer and war hero, killed in action.
- Charles Coles, 81, American actor (Dirty Dancing, The Cotton Club) and tap dancer, cancer.
- Reg Drew, 82, Australian rules footballer.
- Dante Gianello, 80, Italian-French bicycle racer.
- Stanisław Karpiel, 83, Polish cross-country skier and Olympian (1936).
- Muhammad Masihullah Khan, 81, Indian Islamic scholar.
- Gregory Markopoulos, 64, American filmmaker.
- Eddie Mayehoff, 83, American actor.
- David Oliver, 30, American actor, AIDS.
- Yeter Sevimli, 44, Turkish Olympic boxer (1968).

=== 13 ===
- Ronnie Bond, 52, English drummer (The Troggs).
- Harold Bower, 80, American basketball player.
- Franco Calabrese, 69, Italian bass singer.
- Waldemar Malak, 22, Polish weightlifter and Olympic medalist (1992), traffic collision.
- Maurice Ohana, 79, French composer.
- Johnny Ostrowski, 75, American baseball player.
- St John Pike, 82, Irish anglican bishop.
- Wally Shaner, 92, American baseball player (Cleveland Indians, Boston Red Sox, Cincinnati Reds).
- Claude Wilborn, 80, American baseball player (Boston Bees).
- Jim Zyntell, 82, American football player (New York Giants, Philadelphia Eagles).

=== 14 ===
- George Adams, 52, American jazz musician.
- Byron Beams, 57, American football player (Pittsburgh Steelers, Houston Oilers).
- Clem Beauchamp, 94, American film producer.
- Greg Curnoe, 55, Canadian painter, bicycle accident.
- Ernst Happel, 66, Austrian football player, manager, and Olympian (1948), lung cancer.
- Alan Jarman, 69, Australian politician.
- Ken McLean, 69, Australian rules footballer.
- Gregorio Prieto, 95, Spanish painter.
- Joop van Nellen, 82, Dutch football player.
- Keith Waller, 78, Australian diplomat.

=== 15 ===
- Billy Hassett, 71, American basketball player (Minneapolis Lakers, Baltimore Bullets).
- Carl Hinkle, 75, American football player.
- N. H. Keerthiratne, 90, Sri Lankan politician and philanthropist.
- Toots Mondello, 81, American jazz musician.
- Andrii Shtoharenko, 90, Soviet and Ukrainian composer and teacher.

=== 16 ===
- Daniel Björkgren, 53, Swedish racewalker and Olympian (1972).
- Clancy Fernando, 54, Sri Lankan Navy admiral, murdered.
- Bob Gillson, 87, American football player.
- Harold Glasser, 86, American economist.
- Phyllis Harding, 84, English backstroke and freestyle swimmer and Olympic medalist (1924, 1928, 1932, 1936).
- Leslie Hotson, 95, Canadian literary historian and critic.
- Max Huber, 73, Swiss graphic designer.
- Sir Raman Osman, 90, Mauritian politician, governor-general (1972–1977).
- Gene Schott, 79, American Major League Baseball player (Cincinnati Reds, Philadelphia Phillies, Brooklyn Dodgers).

=== 17 ===
- Todd Armstrong, 55, American actor (Jason and the Argonauts, Manhunt, King Rat), suicide.
- Raffaele Bastoni, 67, Italian Olympic canoeist (1952).
- Audre Lorde, 58, American poet and feminist, breast cancer.
- Dzintars Lācis, 52, Latvian cyclist and Olympian (1964, 1968).
- Lu Yao, 42, Chinese novelist, cancer.
- Clarence Moore, 84, American baseball player.
- Darren Smith, 20, Australian Olympic cyclist (1992).

=== 18 ===
- Ed Franco, 77, American gridiron football player, heart attack.
- Dorothy Kirsten, 82, American singer, complications from a stroke.
- Herman Musaph, 77, Dutch dermatologist and sexologist.
- Hidekichi Nagamatsu, 78, Japanese Olympic boxer (1936).
- John Skehan, 70, Irish journalist and broadcaster.
- Radu Tudoran, 82, Romanian novelist.

=== 19 ===
- Jeffery Lee Griffin, 37, American convicted murderer, execution by lethal injection.
- Bobby Russell, 52, American singer, coronary artery disease.
- Shinichi Sekizawa, 71, Japanese screenwriter (Godzilla).
- René Tavernier, 78, Belgian geologist and academic.
- Diane Varsi, 54, American actress (Peyton Place, Wild in the Streets, Ten North Frederick), respiratory failure.

=== 20 ===
- William Fields, 63, American rower and Olympic champion (1952), and later naval officer.
- John Foreman, 67, American film producer (Butch Cassidy and the Sundance Kid, Prizzi's Honor, The Man Who Would Be King).
- Mária Frank, 49, Hungarian Olympic swimmer (1960, 1964).
- Leonard A. Funk Jr., 76, American soldier, Medal of Honor recipient.
- Thomas Lefebvre, 65, Canadian politician.
- Félix Marten, 73, German-French film actor, pulmonary embolism.
- Howard Mutton, 68, Australian cricketer.

=== 21 ===
- Vicente Arraya, 70, Bolivian football goalkeeper.
- Steve Buchanan, 89, American football player.
- Severino Gazzelloni, 73, Italian flutist.
- Swaroop Kishen, 62, Indian cricket player, cancer.
- Shane A. Parker, 49, British-Australian museum curator and ornithologist, lymphoma.
- Kaysone Phomvihane, 71, Laotian politician, president (since 1991) and prime minister (1975–1991).
- Ricky Williams, 36, American musician.

=== 22 ===
- Bryan Cosgrave, 89, Australian sportsman.
- Viktor Dubynin, 49, Soviet and Russian Chief of the General Staff, cancer.
- Sterling Holloway, 87, American voice actor (Winnie the Pooh, Alice in Wonderland, The Jungle Book), heart attack.
- Roberto Mouras, 44, Argentine racing driver, racing accident.
- Ronald Sinclair, 68, New Zealand actor and film editor, respiratory failure.
- Gerard Wall, 72, New Zealand politician.

=== 23 ===
- Roy Acuff, 89, American country musician, congestive heart failure.
- Mohamed Benhima, 68, Moroccan politician, prime minister (1967–1969).
- Rita Corday, 72, American actress, complications from diabetes.
- Parviz Dehdari, 59, Iranian football player and coach.
- Colin Evans, 56, Welsh rugby player.
- Ward Hermans, 95, Belgian Flemish nationalist politician and writer.
- Doug Palmer, 62, Australian rules footballer.
- Alan Peel, 83, Australian rules footballer.
- Manuel Pelegrina, 72, Argentine football player, pneumonia.
- Jean Thiriart, 70, Belgian political theorist, heart attack.

=== 24 ===
- Xavier Darasse, 58, French organist, cancer.
- Hans de Koster, 78, Dutch politician.
- Hewritt Dixon, 52, American gridiron football player (Denver Broncos, Oakland Raiders), cancer.
- Theodore Miller Edison, 94, American environmentalist and son of Thomas Edison, Parkinson's disease.
- Frances A. Genter, 94, American racehorse owner and breeder.
- Harold Preece, 86, American writer.
- Henriette Puig-Roget, 82, French musician.
- June Tyson, 56, American singer, violinist, and dancer.

=== 25 ===
- Joseph Arthur Ankrah, 77, Ghanaian politician, military head of state (1966–1969).
- Piet Ikelaar, 96, Dutch cyclist and Olympic medalist (1920).
- Pearse Jordan, 22, Northern Irish IRA volunteer, shot.
- Pete McCulley, 60, American football coach.
- Charles Mott-Radclyffe, 80, British politician.
- Mark Reizen, 97, Russian opera singer.
- Dmitry Ukolov, 63, Russian ice hockey player and Olympian (1956).
- Aslak Versto, 67, Norwegian politician.

=== 26 ===
- Jon Baker, 69, American football player (New York Giants).
- Ciccio Barbi, 73, Italian film actor.
- Joby Blanshard, 73, English actor (Doomwatch).
- Annie Skau Berntsen, 81, Norwegian missionary.
- Marcel Cordes, 72, German operatic baritone.
- Adrienne Dore, 85, American model and actress.
- Max Jørgensen, 69, Danish Olympic cyclist (1948).
- Leopold Mitrofanov, 60, Russian chess composer.
- Ray Niven, 81, Australian rules footballer.
- Néstor Osvaldo Perlongher, 42, Argentine poet, AIDS.
- Kathleen Russell, 80, South African freestyle swimmer and Olympic medalist (1928).
- John Sharp, 72, British actor (Barry Lyndon, The Wicker Man, All Creatures Great and Small).
- John White, 90, American singer.

=== 27 ===
- Ivan Generalić, 77, Croatian painter.
- Billy Kearns, 69, American actor, lung cancer.
- Diana Neave, Baroness Airey of Abingdon, 73, British life peer, member of the House of Lords (since 1979).
- Almond Richards, 81, Australian rules footballer.
- Daniel Santos, 76, Puerto Rican singer and composer of boleros, heart attack.
- Walt Tauscher, 91, American baseball player (Pittsburgh Pirates, Washington Senators).

=== 28 ===
- Stendy Appeltoft, 72, Swedish footballer.
- Frank Armi, 74, American racing driver.
- Wayne Bennett, 60, American blues guitarist.
- Randall Duell, 89, American motion picture art director, stroke.
- Ralph Hone, 96, British Army officer and colonial administrator.
- Sidney Nolan, 75, Australian artist.
- Stanley Joseph Ott, 65, American prelate of the Roman Catholic Church, liver cancer.
- Ville Salminen, 84, Finnish film actor, director, writer and producer.

=== 29 ===
- Jean Dieudonné, 86, French mathematician.
- Raoul Ploquin, 92, French film producer.
- Arthur Plowright, 76, Scottish cricketer.
- Emilio Pucci, 78, Italian fashion designer and politician.
- Blanchette Ferry Rockefeller, 83, American philanthropist and wife of John D. Rockefeller III
- Paul Ryan, 44, English singer and songwriter, lung cancer.
- Robert Shayne, 92, American actor, lung cancer.
- Robert F. Simon, 83, American actor, heart attack.
- Tuck Stainback, 81, American baseball player.
- Grady Stiles, 55, American freak show performer and murderer, murdered.
- Wally Voss, 34, American bass player, Hodgkin's lymphoma.

=== 30 ===
- Peter Blume, 86, American artist.
- Jorge Donn, 45, Argentine ballet dancer, AIDS.
- Saburo Kurata, 90, Japanese painter.
- Bernard Lefebvre, 86, French photographer.
- Jack Metherell, 80, Australian rules footballer.
- Ancher Nelsen, 88, American politician, member of the United States House of Representatives (1959-1974).
- Lawrence Picachy, 76, Indian Jesuit priest and archbishop of Calcutta (1969-1992).
- Kuthur Ramakrishnan Srinivasan, 82, Indian archeologist and historian.
- Graham Vearncombe, 58, British football player.
