= Christian Brothers College, Adelaide =

Catholic school in South Australia

Christian Brothers College

Location
- Primary campus: 324 Wakefield Street; Adelaide, South Australia; Australia Secondary campus: 214 Wakefield Street; Adelaide, South Australia; Australia; 34.9278°S 138.6097°E

Information
- Type: Catholic school
- Motto: Ante faciem domini (Before the face of the Lord)
- Denomination: Catholic (Christian Brothers)
- Established: 15 August 1878
- Principal: David Johnston
- Enrolment: 974 (2024)
- Campus: Urban
- Colours: Purple, white and gold
- Affiliation: Sports Association for Adelaide Schools
- Website: www.cbc.sa.edu.au
- Christian Brothers schools in South Australia; CBC • Rostrevor • St. Paul's

Christian Brothers College (CBC) is a private Catholic school in Adelaide, South Australia. It was founded by a group of Irish Christian Brothers in 1878. It is now one of three Christian Brothers schools in the state, along with St Paul's College, Adelaide and Rostrevor College. Like the other colleges, the influence of the original Christian Brothers has waned, and it is now administered by EREA. The last brother left the school in 2007.

CBC is predominantly a secondary school, although it has a primary school campus, with a combined student population of approximately 970 (as of 2024).

== Houses ==
Christian Brothers College has six houses. Each house is named after a person or place connected with the story of Edmund Ignatius Rice.

Upon commencement at the college, each student is assigned to one of the six houses:

| House name | Colour | Name inspiration | Current head of house (As of 2026) |
|---|---|---|---|
| Sion | Emerald green | Mount Sion | Deon Visser |
| Waterford | Cyan blue | Waterford | Anthony Disibio |
| Treacy | Ochre orange | Br Patrick Ambrose Treacy | George Bryant |
| Callan | Pure white | Callan | Nicolette Roberts |
| Nagle | Golden yellow | Nano Nagle | Daniel Schoenmakers |
| Avila | Bright red | Saint Teresa of Ávila | Tom Corkery |

In the senior campus for Christian Brothers College, students can nominate to be a leader of their house.

== Notable alumni ==
=== Arts and entertainment ===
- C.J. Dennis, poet
- Roy Rene, alias of Henry van der Sluys, pioneering comedian, "Australia's Charlie Chaplin"
- Benedict Samuel, actor
- Xavier Samuel, actor

=== Politics ===
- James Arnold, senator
- Anthony Byrne, former Federal Member of Parliament
- Bill Denny, state MP 1900–1933
- John Gazzola, former President of the South Australian Legislative Council
- Justin Hanson, state Member of Parliament
- Eric Heenan, Western Australian politician
- Tom Howard, trade unionist and politician
- Stephan Knoll, former State Member of Parliament
- John Madden, Tasmanian politician
- Charles McHugh, senator
- Sir Robert Nicholls, state politician, speaker 1933–1956.
- Sir Baden Pattinson. MP for Glenelg, 1947–1965. Minister of Education, 1953–1965

=== Sports ===
- Alby Bahr, Australian rules footballer
- Frank Barry, Australian rules footballer
- Leonard Chamberlain, first-class cricketer and Australian rules footballer
- Mick Clingly, Australian rules footballer
- Colin Egar, test cricket umpire
- Jaime Fernandez, three-time Olympic rower
- Michael Frederick, Australian rules footballer
- Sir Edmund Britten Jones, cricketer and Australian rules footballer. Rhodes scholar
- Tom Leahy, Australian rules footballer
- Jack Londrigan, Australian rules footballer
- Tom MacKenzie, Australian rules footballer
- Dan Moriarty, Australian rules footballer
- Jack Nash, cricketer and Australian rules footballer
- Peter Nelson, Olympic cyclist
- Laurence Power, cricketer and operatic tenor
- Neville Roberts, Australian rules footballer

=== Other ===
- James Cavanagh, architect
- Vice Admiral Ray Griggs, senior public servant
- Sir Aubrey Lewis, Psychiatrist, first Professor of Psychiatry at the Institute of Psychiatry, London (now part of King's College London)
- Paul McGuire, diplomat
- Paul Vasileff, fashion designer
- Samuel Albert White, racehorse owner, soldier, explorer, conservationist and amateur ornithologist

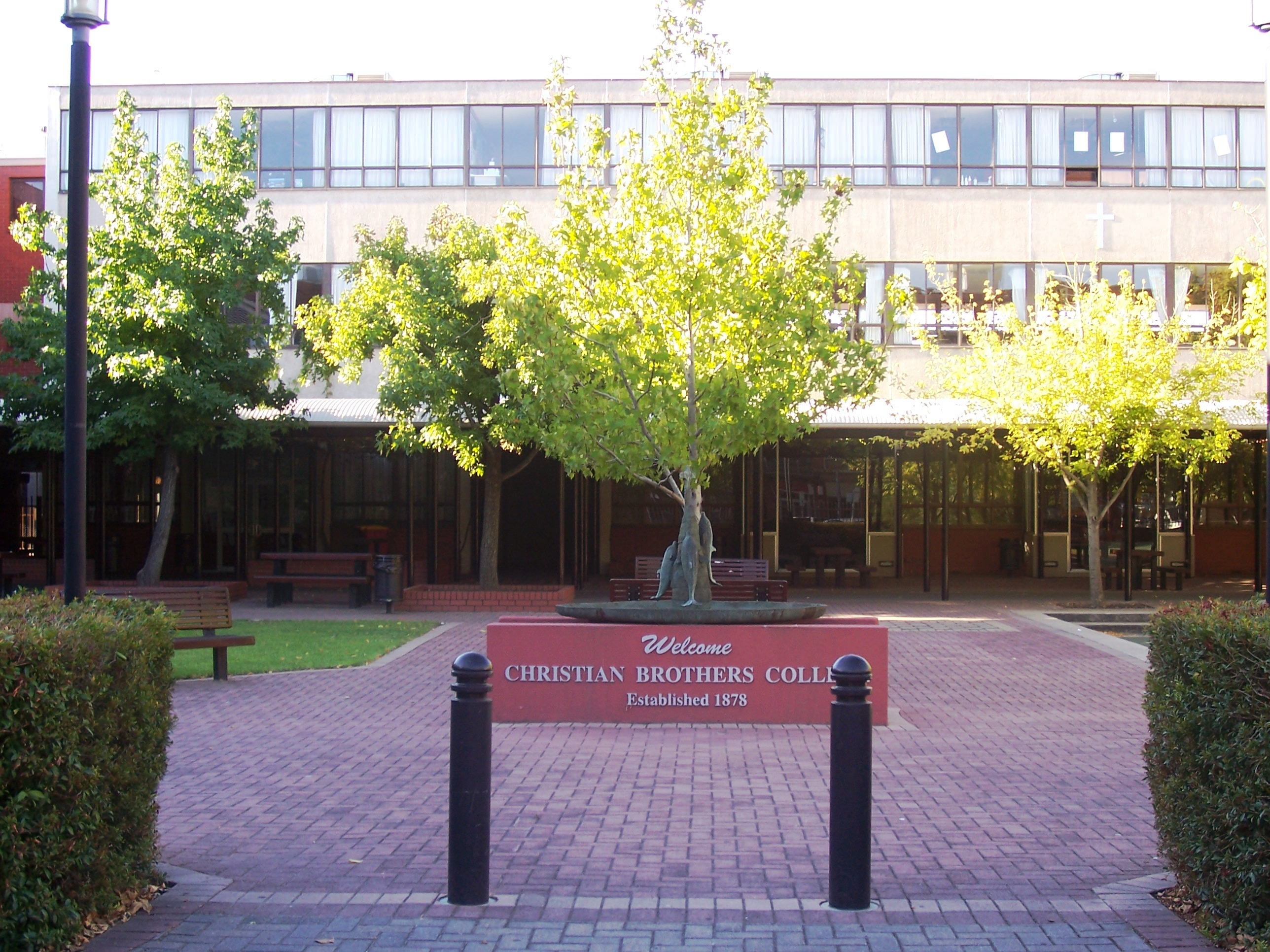
Entrance to secondary campus via Wakefield Street

== Notable staff ==
- Carl Püttmann

== Controversy ==
In May 2014, the Royal Commission into Institutional Responses to Child Sex Abuse heard that a long line of Christian Brothers accused of child sex abuse were transferred to Christian Brothers College in Adelaide from 1919 to 1969.

On 12 December 2018, a former teacher at Christian Brothers College was sentenced to at least two years in prison for having a sexual relationship with one of her students over a two-month period in 2016.
