= Bessen =

Bessen is a surname. Notable people with the surname include:

- James Bessen (born 1950), American economist
- Mervyn Bessen (1913–2002), Australian sportsman

== See also ==
- Bassen
