= Aub (disambiguation) =

Aub is a town in Germany.

Aub or AUB may also refer to:

== People with the name ==
=== Surname ===
- Carmen Aub (born 1989), Mexican actress
- Joseph Charles Aub (1890-1973), American endocrinologist
- Joseph Aub (rabbi) (1804–1880), German rabbi
- Max Aub (1903–1972), Mexican-Spanish novelist, playwright and critic

=== Given name ===
- Aub Carrigan (1917–2012), Australian cricketer
- Aub Charleston (1901–1985), Australian rules footballer
- Aub Hodgson (1912–1982), Australian rugby union player
- Aub Kelly (1904–1974), Australian Rugby league player
- Aub Lawson (1915–1977), Australian speedway rider

== Groups, companies, organizations ==
- African Union of Broadcasting, association of national radio and television organizations in Africa
- Augsburg Airways (ICAO airline code AUB), a defunct regional German airline

=== Banks ===
- Asia United Bank, based in the Philippines
- Asia Universal Bank, based in Kyrgyzstan

=== Religious organizations ===
- Anjuman-i-Ulama-i-Bangala, defunct Islamic organisation based in British Bengal
- Apostolic United Brethren, a polygamous Mormon fundamentalist church

=== Universities ===
- American University of Beirut, Lebanon
- Andrássy University Budapest, Hungary
- Arts University Bournemouth, Poole, United Kingdom
- Asian University of Bangladesh, Dhaka

== Other uses ==
- Abnormal uterine bleeding, a menstrual condition
- Auburn railway station, Melbourne
- Phupha language (ISO 639 language code aub)

== See also ==
- Aube (disambiguation)
