= Reg Ellis (Australian sportsman) =

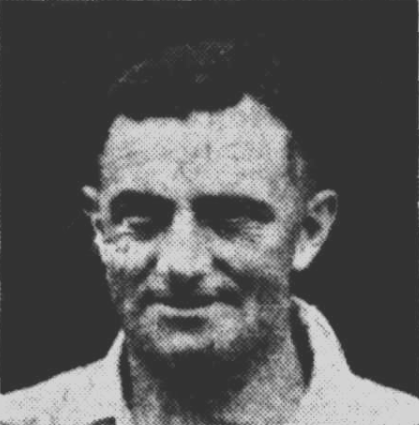

Personal information
- Full name: Reginald Newnham Ellis
- Born: 22 February 1891; Randwick, New South Wales
- Died: 26 May 1959 (aged 68); Cheltenham, Victoria
- Original team: Y.M.C.A. (Sydney)
- Height: 179 cm (5 ft 10 in)
- Weight: 78 kg (172 lb)
- Position: Defender

Playing career^{1}
Years	Club	Games (Goals)
1913–1915	St Kilda	52 (1)
1920	Melbourne	1 (0)
Total		53 (1)
- ^{1} Playing statistics correct to the end of 1920.

Reginald Newnham Ellis (22 February 1891 – 26 May 1959) was an Australian sportsman who played first-class cricket for Victoria and Australian rules football in the Victorian Football League (VFL) mainly with St Kilda. A New South Welshman, the defender played 53 games in the VFL from 1913 to 1915 and captained New South Wales in interstate football.

== Early life in Sydney ==
Ellis was born in Randwick, New South Wales, a suburb of Sydney, however he was schooled in Melbourne for a few years where he learned to play Australian rules and developed a passion for it, continuing to play upon his return to Sydney. He joined the Y.M.C.A football club in the New South Wales Football Association Ellis represented New South Wales in the 1911 Adelaide Carnival. He became Y.M.C.A's captain in its last season in 1913. Ellis was recruited by St Kilda following the carnival and made the move to Melbourne.

== VFL Football, World War I service and New South Wales representative ==
During his first year in Melbourne Ellis was considered a fine reliable player and an excellent executor of the drop kick and place kick. A defender, played 53 games in the VFL, all but one of them for St Kilda from 1913 to 1915. He participated in St Kilda's 1913 VFL Grand Final loss to Fitzroy.

Ellis enlisted in artillery during World War I. Upon his return from the war in 1920 he switched clubs, signing with Melbourne however made just one appearance for the club.

At the 1924 Hobart Carnival, Ellis captained New South Wales to a convincing victory over Queensland.

== Cricket ==
His cricket career began over seven years after he played his last VFL game and he was aged 36 when he made his first-class debut against Tasmania. The Victorian opening pair in the first innings of Fred Baring and Basil Onyons were also league footballers, as was their wicket-keeper Stuart King. Ellis came in at three and made just the one run before being dismissed. He made amends in the second innings with a century. His even hundred allowed Victoria to chase their fourth innings target of 182 with five wickets in hand.

Ellis went on to represent Victoria in the 1928–29 and 1929–30 Sheffield Shield seasons. He finished with 355 runs from his seven first-class matches at an average of 29.58. His only other century came in a Shield encounter against Queensland at the MCG in 1928 when he made an unbeaten 107. Ellis also took three wickets in his career, including dismissing Test player Alan Fairfax.

== See also ==
- 1911 Adelaide Carnival
- List of Victoria first-class cricketers
