= Goodrick =

Goodrick is a surname. Notable people with the surname include:

- Alan Goodrick (Gimpo), British film director
- Garney Goodrick (1895–1929), Australian sportsman who played first-class cricket for Tasmania and Australian rules football in the Victorian Football League
- Mick Goodrick (born 1945), American post bop jazz guitarist and educator most noteworthy for his work with vibraphonist Gary Burton's band
