= Victor Goodwin =

Australian cricketer (1906–1957)

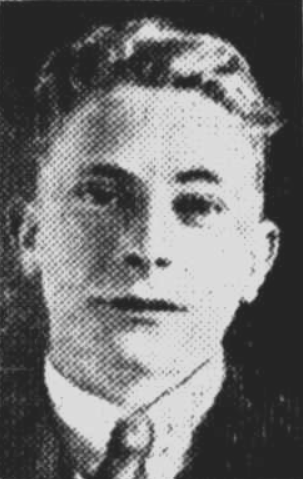
- Goodwin in 1923.

Personal information
- Full name: Victor Henry Vallance Goodwin
- Born: 26 October 1906; Sydney, Australia
- Died: 22 September 1957 (aged 50); Sydney, Australia
- Source: Cricinfo, 3 October 2020

Victor Goodwin (26 October 1906 – 22 September 1957) was an Australian cricketer who was a batsman and noted for his skill as a fielder. He played in nine first-class matches for Queensland between 1929 and 1931.

== Cricket career ==
Goodwin was a successful sportsman while in school representing the combined NSW primary schools baseball team against a combined High Schools team in 1920 and then playing for the High Schools team against Victoria and University in 1921 and 1922. He attended Petersham High School and in 1922 he represented their cricket team scoring three centuries in the year, took 8 for 7 with the ball in a match, and he also began playing junior cricket for the Petersham Cricket Club the same year.

In September 1928 Goodwin moved to Brisbane where he began playing for Valley in district cricket and working for a branch of the Bank of Adelaide. He was selected for Queensland in the 1928/29 Sheffield Shield season but declined his place due to business commitments, but in the following season he was selected for Queensland Colts and scored a century against NSW Colts at the Sydney Cricket Ground. In the 1929/30 season he was able to make his First-class debut for Queensland and he averaged 25.50 over ten innings for the season. In 1930/31 he averaged 36.60 in the Sheffield Shield for Queensland over six innings and in January 1931 he represented Queensland in a tour game against the West Indies and scored 60 out of a team innings of 167 and 54 in an innings of 188 for the side.

In the 1931/32 season Goodwin began playing for Northern Suburbs in district cricket however in November 1931 he was transferred to a Sydney branch of the Bank of Adelaide forcing him to leave the club and turn down his selection for the Queensland state side. He intended to return to the Petersham club after returning to New South Wales. His departure from Queensland was reported as a big loss for the State side and he was described as one of the State's "most reliable run-getters and most brilliant fielders." The Valley Cricket Club held a banquet at the Empire Hotel to farewell Goodwin and the secretary of the Queensland Cricket Association, R.T. Stephens, mentioned him as one of the magnificent fieldsman who had been important to Queensland cricket and Leo O'Connor presented him with a kit bag on behalf of the Valley Cub and stated that he had great hopes for him as a "bosey bowler" commenting that if he set his mind to it he would be playing for New South Wales as a batsman and spin bowler.

== See also ==
- List of Queensland first-class cricketers
