= Stuart King (disambiguation) =

Stuart King was an Australian sportsman.

Stuart King may also refer to:

- Stuart King (musician), drummer with The Dictators in the 1970s
- Stuart King, character in the Loch Henry episode of the Netflix series Black Mirror

== See also ==
- Stuart Kings
