= James Everett =

James, Jimmy, or Jim Everett may refer to:

- James Everett (politician) (1890–1967), Irish politician
- James Everett (writer) (1784–1872), English Methodist and miscellaneous writer
- Jim Everett (Australian footballer) (1884–1968), Australian rules footballer
- Jimmy Everett (1908–1996), American baseball player
- Jim Everett (born 1963), American football quarterback
- James Everett, candidate in the 2013 election for the mayor of Minneapolis
