= Kym Hodgeman =

Australian rules footballer

Personal information
- Born: 30 July 1956 (age 70)
- Height: 175 cm (5 ft 9 in)
- Weight: 74 kg (163 lb)

Playing career^{1}
Years	Club	Games (Goals)
1974–80, 1986–90	Glenelg	244 (411)
1981–85	North Melbourne	91 (133)

Coaching career
Years	Club	Games (W–L–D)
1991–92	Glenelg	48 (26–22–0)
- ^{1} Playing statistics correct to the end of 1990.

Career highlights
- Reserves Magarey Medallist 1974; Glenelg best and fairest 1977, 1978, 1989; Glenelg leading goalkicker 1978, 1979 (51, 32); Magarey Medallist 1978; North Melbourne best and fairest 1984; Glenelg premiership player 1986; 9 state games for South Australia; All-Australian 1979; Glenelg Hall of Fame inductee 2002; South Australian Football Hall of Fame inaugural inductee 2002

Kym Hodgeman (born 30 July 1956) is a former Australian rules footballer best known for his playing career with Glenelg in the SANFL from 1974 - 1980 & secondly for a 5 year stint with North Melbourne in the Australian Football League (VFL) from 1981 - 1985, before he returned to Glenelg 1986 where tasted a premiership success, playing again with the Tigers until his retirement in 1990.

== SANFL career ==
A goalkicking rover, Hodgeman established a reputation as a skillful and courageous player. He won the Reserves grade Magarey Medal in 1974 despite spending almost half the season playing in Glenelg's league team.

Hodgeman won Glenelg's best and fairest award in 1977 and 1978 and also topped the club's goal kicking for seasons in 1978 (51 goals) and 1979 (32 goals). In 1978, Hodgeman won the League's highest individual award, the Magarey Medal for "fairest and most brilliant" player, polling one vote more than three-time winner of the award, Russell Ebert. By winning the medal Hodgeman became one of just a handful of players who would win the award in both the SANFL League and Reserves competitions.

In 1979 Hodgeman was selected as an All-Australian following that year's State of Origin Carnival in Perth.

== VFL career ==
Like many South Australian players of the time, Hodgeman was lured to the more lucrative VFL at the peak of his career. In late 1977, he signed a Form Four which tied him to the Carlton Football Club when he chose to move to Victoria; but, in 1980, while Hodgeman was still at Glenelg, Carlton traded his Form Four to Melbourne as part of a deal to secure Greg Wells. Hodgeman had no desire to play for Melbourne, and objected to Carlton's treatment of his contract, likening it to horse trading, so he turned his back on both clubs and signed with North Melbourne in 1981.

Hodgeman played five seasons with the Kangaroos, winning their best and fairest award, the Syd Barker Medal (and also best clubman) in 1984. Over his five seasons in the VFL Hodgeman played in 91 games, kicking 133 goals.

== Later SANFL career ==
Hodgeman returned to Glenelg in 1986, playing in a winning Grand Final side that year against North Adelaide. He won his third Glenelg best and fairest award in 1989, before retiring as a player at the end of 1990 following the Tigers' loss to Port Adelaide in the Grand Final.

Following the recruitment of the Glenelg coach, Graham Cornes, by the newly formed Adelaide Crows, Hodgeman coached the Glenelg side in 1991 and 1992, taking them to the Grand Final in 1992 where again they were defeated by Port Adelaide.

Hodgeman was inducted into the Glenelg Hall of Fame in 2002 and the same year was one of 113 inaugural inductees into the South Australian Football Hall of Fame.

== Personal life ==
Kym Hodgeman is the uncle of former Glenelg footballer Ben Moore and former North Melbourne, Adelaide and Western Bulldogs player Scott Welsh.
