= Aubé =

Aubé may refer to:

- Charles Nicholas Aubé (1802–1869), a French physician and entomologist
- Jean-Paul Aubé (1837–1916), a French sculptor
- Pierre Aubé (born 1944), a French medieval specialist and the author of many important books
- Stéphan Aubé (born 1971), a French music video director and pianist

== See also ==
- Aube (disambiguation)
- Nicolas Aubé-Kubel (born 1996), Canadian ice hockey player
- Théophile Aube (1826–1890), French admiral
