= Bassen =

Bassen is a surname. Notable people with the surname include:

- Bartholomeus van Bassen (1590–1652), Dutch Golden Age painter and architect
- Bob Bassen (born 1965), retired Canadian ice hockey centre
- Chad Bassen (born 1983), Canadian professional ice hockey forward
- Frank Bassen, (1903–2003), haematologist and internist in New York, 1933–1978
- Hank Bassen (1932–2009), Canadian ice hockey goaltender

== See also ==
- Bassens (disambiguation)
