= Cornelius Chamberlain =

Australian rules footballer and cricketer

Personal information
- Full name: Cornelius Thomas Chamberlain
- Born: 20 December 1882; Mitchelstown, County Cork, Ireland
- Died: 14 November 1943 (aged 60); Rose Park, South Australia
- Batting: Right-handed
- Role: All-rounder

Domestic team information
- Years: Team
- 1905/06–1910/11: South Australia

Career statistics
Competition	First-class
Matches	3
Runs scored	31
Batting average	6.20
100s/50s	0/0
Top score	18
Balls bowled	102
Wickets	1
Bowling average	74.00
5 wickets in innings	0
10 wickets in match	0
Best bowling	1/59
Catches/stumpings	0/–
- Source: , 20 April 2023

Cornelius Thomas "Con" Chamberlain (20 December 1882 – 14 November 1943) was an Australian first-class cricketer who played for South Australia.

Chamberlain, who was born in Mitchelstown, County Cork, made his first-class debut in the 1905/06 season. He appeared in two matches against Western Australia at the WACA Ground and Fremantle Oval. In the first he only bowled three of his team's 168 overs for the match yet batted at ten in both innings. He wasn't called on to bowl at all in the second fixture in Fremantle but batted further up the order at seven. His third and final first-class match for his state didn't come until 1910/11, when South Australia hosted South Africa at the Adelaide Oval. During this match he took his only first-class wicket, that Louis Stricker, but not before the South African Test opener had made 146.

He was also an Australian rules footballer for Norwood in the South Australian Football Association (SAFA), debuting in 1902. His brothers, Jack and Leonard, were also Norwood footballers and state cricketers.
