= Kym Dillon =

Australian radio personality

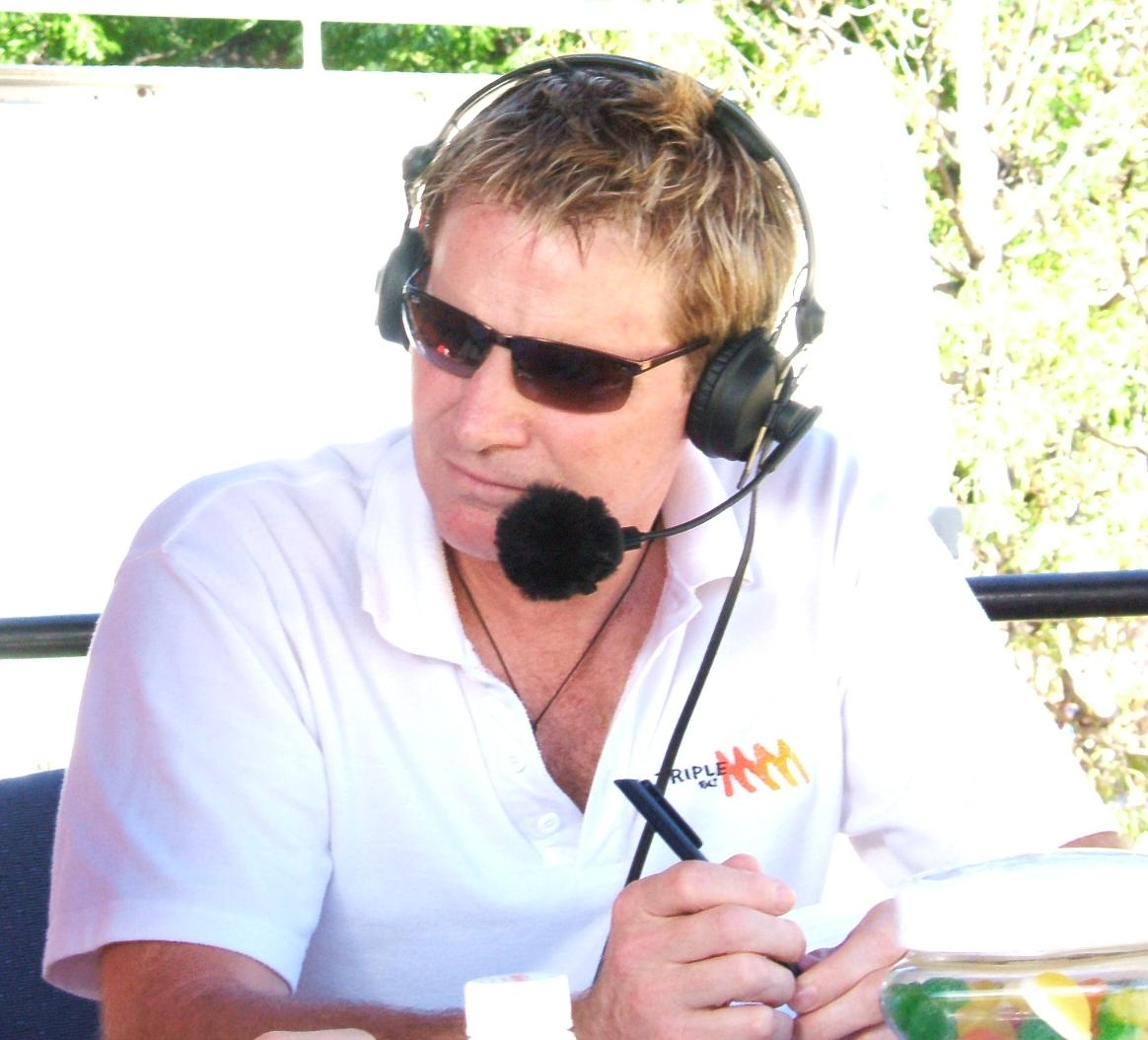
Kym Dillon commentating at the Tour Down Under

Kym Dillon (born 19 June 1959) is the former sports presenter for Nine News Adelaide. He is also part of the successful sports coverage and football commentary team at FIVEaa. Prior to his media career he played football for SANFL clubs North Adelaide and West Torrens in the late 1970s and early 1980s, winning a Reserves Magarey Medal in 1982.

Kym was made redundant from NWS-9 on 19 June 2015 after 27 years.
