= Jack Barnes (Australian footballer) =

Australian rules footballer

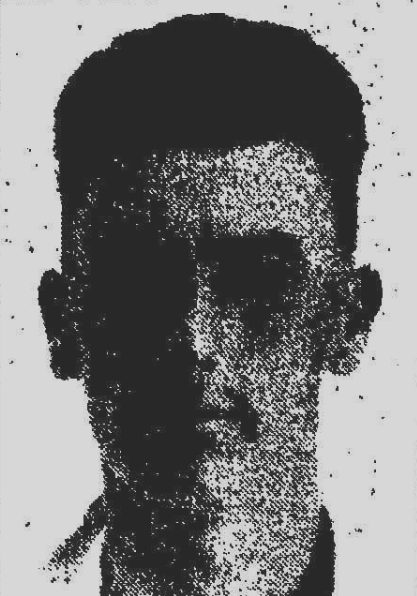

Personal information
- Full name: John Robert Barnes
- Born: 20 May 1905; Williamstown, Victoria
- Died: 6 October 1999 (aged 94); Williamstown, Victoria
- Debut: Round 7, 1925, South Melbourne vs. Essendon, at Windy Hill
- Height: 185 cm (6 ft 1 in)
- Weight: 87 kg (192 lb)

Playing career^{1}
Years	Club	Games (Goals)
1925–1929	South Melbourne	41 (71)
1930–1934	Williamstown (VFA)	67 (76)
- ^{1} Playing statistics correct to the end of 1934.

John Robert Barnes (20 May 1905 – 6 October 1999) was an Australian rules footballer who played with South Melbourne in the Victorian Football League (VFL) during the 1920s.

Born in Williamstown, John Robert Barnes was used mostly as a forward and kicked 34 goals in 1928, including a bag of six against Geelong at Lake Oval. His son Ken played at South Melbourne in the 1960s.

John Robert Barnes also represented Victoria in a first-class cricket match in 1930 as a right-handed batsman. Playing against Tasmania at the MCG, John Robert Barnes batted in the middle order and made 51. It would be his only innings at first-class level. Fellow VFL footballers Stuart King and Heinrich Schrader also played in that match for Victoria.

After leaving South Melbourne, John Robert Barnes played for Williamstown in the VFA from 1930 to 1934, notching up 67 games and kicking 76 goals. Jack was captain and vice-captain at times during 1931 and 1932 and was vice-captain in 1934 until Jack quit the club after a dispute following a 20-goal defeat at Toorak Park against Prahran in round 8. Jack then transferred to Williamstown District as captain-coach and won the VFA Sub-Districts competition best and fairest award despite playing just six games.

== See also ==
- List of Victoria first-class cricketers
