= Brodie Atkinson =

Australian rules footballer

Personal information
- Full name: Brodie Jay Atkinson
- Born: 31 July 1972 (age 54); Port Pirie
- Original team: Sturt (SANFL)
- Debut: Round 11, 12 June 1993, St Kilda vs. Brisbane Bears, at Waverley Park
- Height: 169 cm (5 ft 7 in)
- Weight: 72 kg (11 st 5 lb; 159 lb)

Playing career^{1}
Years	Club	Games (Goals)
1990–1995	North Adelaide	98 (112)
1993	St Kilda	2 (0)
1999	Adelaide	5 (2)
1996–2002	Sturt	124 (131)
Total		229 (244)
- ^{1} Playing statistics correct to the end of 2002.

Career highlights
- AFL Rising Star nominee 1993; Magarey Medal winner 1997; Reserves Magarey Medal winner 1991

Brodie Jay Atkinson (born 31 July 1972) is a former Australian rules footballer who played in the Australian Football League (AFL) and the South Australian National Football League (SANFL).

Atkinson joined the North Adelaide Football Club in 1990 from Port Pirie club Risdon who formerly competed in the Spencer Gulf Football League. He played League and Reserves football for North, winning the Reserves Magarey Medal in 1991 and being one of North's best in the 1991 SANFL Grand Final. At the end of the 1992 season the tough midfielder was drafted by St Kilda at pick 16 in the 1992 AFL draft.

In his debut match at age 20 for St Kilda in Round 11 1993 he had 25 touches and earned an AFL Rising Star nomination and two Brownlow Medal votes, but was dropped after one more match despite being among the best once more. In a shock decision, he was delisted at the end of the season.

Atkinson returned to North Adelaide and played from 1994 to 1996, before moving to Sturt in 1997. Atkinson would play 98 games and kick 112 goals for North.

After a standout season in 1997 for Sturt, Atkinson was joint winner of the Magarey Medal, awarded for the best and fairest player in the SANFL competition. Atkinson shared the award with Andrew Jarman.

In an interesting turn on events he was selected in the 1998 AFL draft by Adelaide after trading Chad Rintoul to West Coast for pick 80. At age 26, and out of AFL for several years, his SANFL form with the Sturt Football Club was enough to get him re-drafted. Hampered by groin injuries, he played only five games in 1999 before being delisted once again.

He continued to play for Sturt, primarily as a midfielder until 2002, when he moved to the forward pocket. In his 124th and last game for the club they won the 2002 SANFL Grand Final over Central District.

On 24 October 2000, Atkinson was awarded the Australian Sports Medal for being a recipient of the highest individual honour in South Australian Football.

At age 30 Atkinson captain-coached Portland to a Western Border Football League premiership in 2003. He went on the coach Portland for three years in the Western Border Football League.
