= Barry Harper =

Australian rules footballer and cricketer

Personal information
- Full name: Barry James Harper
- Born: 30 October 1938; Launceston, Tasmania, Australia
- Died: 28 April 2003 (aged 64); Launceston, Tasmania, Australia
- Height: 1.84 m (6 ft 0 in)
- Batting: Right-handed
- Bowling: Right-arm medium

Domestic team information
- Years: Team
- 1962–1969: Tasmania

Career statistics
Competition	FC
Matches	4
Runs scored	84
Batting average	10.50
100s/50s	0/1
Top score	58
Balls bowled	64
Wickets	1
Bowling average	60.00
5 wickets in innings	0
10 wickets in match	0
Best bowling	1/60
Catches/stumpings	3/–
- Source: CricketArchive, 14 April 2015

Barry James Harper (30 October 1938 – 28 April 2003) was an Australian sportsman who played both Australian rules football and cricket at high levels. He played first-class cricket for Tasmania, and played and coached in the Northern Tasmanian Football Association (NTFA).

Born in Launceston, Harper attended Launceston Technical High School (now Queechy High School), excelling at athletics. His football was played for City-South in the NTFA, and he later served as coach of Old Scotch, winning two premierships with the club. A right-handed opening batsman, Harper made his first-class debut for Tasmania during the 1961–62 season, having been a regular participant in the annual North v. South fixture played between NTCA and TCA representative sides. On debut against Victoria in February 1962, he opened with Glen Waters, but was dismissed cheaply in each innings – leg before wicket to Ron Gaunt for one run in the first innings, and run out for five by Alan Connolly and Ray Jordon in the second. He scored 11 and 0 in the next match against South Australia at Adelaide Oval, but in the final game of the season against Victoria at Kardinia Park, Geelong, recorded his only first-class half-century. His innings of 58 runs was made in 230 minutes, and included only two fours.

Tasmania had not yet been invited to compete in the Sheffield Shield during Harper's career, and consequently few interstate matches were played. With the exception of a non-first-class game against Western Australia during the 1965–66 season, Harper did not represent the state team again until the 1968–69 season, by which time he was 30. In January 1969, he was included in the Tasmanian team to face the touring West Indian side at Hobart's TCA Ground. Batting third rather than opening, Harper was twice dismissed cheaply by spinner Lance Gibbs, caught on both occasions. However, he did take his sole first-class wicket in the West Indies' first innings, having Seymour Nurse caught behind by Alan Jacobson with his "restraining medium pace" deliveries. He did, however, concede 60 runs from his eight eight-ball overs. That match was Harper's last first-class appearance, though his last appearance in the North v. South fixture came two seasons later in December 1969. His grade cricket had been played for the Riverside Cricket Club in the Northern Tasmanian Cricket Association (NTCA), which he captained for a period (also later serving as the club's president). In the 1980s and 1990s, he sat on the selection panel for the state team, and was briefly its chairman. Working in insurance and real estate outside of cricket, Harper died of cancer in 2003 at age 64. His daughter, Jacquie Petrusma, was elected to the Tasmanian House of Assembly at the 2010 state election.

== See also ==
- List of Australian rules footballers and cricketers
- List of Tasmanian representative cricketers
