= Joe Kinnear (Australian footballer) =

Australian rules footballer and cricketer

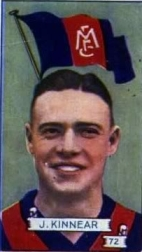

Personal information
- Full name: Joseph David Kinnear
- Born: 12 February 1912; Brunswick West, Victoria
- Died: 14 December 1981 (aged 69); Coburg, Victoria
- Original team: Brunswick
- Height: 182 cm (6 ft 0 in)
- Weight: 85 kg (187 lb)
- Position: Half back

Playing career^{1}
Years	Club	Games (Goals)
1932–37	Melbourne	47 (0)
- ^{1} Playing statistics correct to the end of 1937.

Joseph David Kinnear (12 February 1912 – 14 December 1981) was an Australian rules footballer who played with Melbourne in the Victorian Football League (VFL) during the 1930s.

Kinnear, who was used by Melbourne mostly as a half back, came to the club from Brunswick in the Victorian Football Association (VFA). He spent six seasons at Melbourne and played his last game in their losing Preliminary Final side of 1937. Kinnear later worked at the Melbourne Cricket Ground as its scoreboard manager.

A talented sportsman, Kinnear played two first-class cricket matches against Tasmania in late December 1931. His debut, at Hobart, began on Christmas Day and he bowled 12 wicket-less overs and scored 13 in his only innings for the match. Soon after, Kinnear took the field for Victoria again, this time in Launceston. He dismissed Australian Test cricketer and South Melbourne footballer Laurie Nash with his right-arm fast bowling, the only wicket of his career. The fielder who took the catch, Bryan Cosgrave, was another VFL player.

His son Colin coached the Sydney Swans from 1989 to 1990. Joe Kinnear had a brother Bill Kinnear who was also a sportsman, playing a first-class match for Victoria and three VFL games with Essendon.

== See also ==
- List of Victoria first-class cricketers
