= Aube (disambiguation) =

Aube is a department in the northeastern part of France.

Aube may also refer to:

== Places ==
- Aube, Moselle, a French municipality in the Moselle department
- Aube, Orne, a French municipality in the Orne department
- Aube (river), a river in France

== People ==
- Aubé, a surname
- Aube (musician), a Japanese musician
- Théophile Aube (1826–1890), French admiral

== Other uses ==
- French cruiser Amiral Aube (French: Admiral Aube), a Gloire-class armoured cruiser

== See also ==
- Aubé (disambiguation)
- Aub (disambiguation)
