= Bill Kinnear =

Australian rules footballer, born 1914

Personal information
- Full name: William George Kinnear
- Born: 19 August 1914; West Brunswick, Victoria
- Died: 7 December 1982 (aged 68); West Brunswick, Victoria
- Original team: Brunswick (VFA)

Playing career^{1}
Years	Club	Games (Goals)
1936	Essendon	3 (1)
- ^{1} Playing statistics correct to the end of 1936.

William George Kinnear (19 August 1914 – 7 December 1982) was an Australian sportsman who represented Victoria at first-class cricket and played Australian rules football with Essendon in the Victorian Football League (VFL).

Born in West Brunswick, Kinnear came from a strong sporting family with his brother Joe Kinnear playing VFL football at Melbourne and also cricket for Victoria. His nephew Colin later coached the Sydney Swans.

Kinnear made his only first-class cricket appearance with Victoria during the 1935–36 cricket season, against Tasmania at the Melbourne Cricket Ground. Opening the batting for Victoria, who amassed 531 runs, Kinnear managed to contribute only two of them before being dismissed by future South Melbourne footballer Alan Pearsall.

His football career at the top level was also brief, with three senior games for Essendon in the 1936 VFL season, against North Melbourne, Carlton and Collingwood mid year.

== See also ==
- List of Victoria first-class cricketers
