= Reserves Magarey Medal =

List of medal recipients by year

The Reserves Magarey Medal is an Australian rules football honour awarded annually since 1906 to the fairest and most brilliant player in the South Australian National Football League (SANFL) Reserves competition, as judged by field umpires. The award is based on the Magarey Medal award that was introduced by William Ashley Magarey.

== Winners ==
Year	Name	Club
1906	Roy Le Messurier	Semaphore
1907	Philip Robin	Norwood
1908	George Kersley	West Torrens
1909	Percy Russell	Prospect
1910	Stephen Potter	West Torrens
1911	Percival Rowan	Port Adelaide
1912	Pat Crowley	Port Adelaide
1913	Clarrie Ryan	Sturt
1914	Pat Crowley	Port Adelaide
1915	George Linklater	Port Adelaide
1916–18	No medal awarded	
1919	Jim Clark	Sturt
1920	Bert Schumacher	Norwood
1921	Charles Hepburn	West Adelaide
1922	Wilfred Sparks	Norwood
1923	Harold Jackson	Sturt
1924	James Strugnell	West Torrens
1925	S. Monten	West Torrens
1926	Harold O'Brien	South Adelaide
1927	Marcus Stuart	Sturt
1928	Harold O'Brien	South Adelaide
1929	Wally Griffiths	Norwood
1930	Arnold Smith	Sturt
1931	Ray Whitaker	Port Adelaide
1932	Thomas Hamilton	West Adelaide
1933	Gordon Wait	Norwood
1934	W. Stuart	South Adelaide
1935	Alexander Kinlough	West Torrens
1936	Albert Jones	West Torrens
1937	Ronald Edwards	Glenelg
1938	Ken Sawatzke	West Adelaide
1939	Stan Taylor	Norwood
1940	Eric Nicholls	West Torrens
1941	Lewis Todd	South Adelaide
1942–45	No medal awarded	
1946	Gordon Whittaker	Norwood
1947	Hubert McKenzie	West Torrens
1948	Ron Hoffman	Port Adelaide
1949	Don Bartlett	Sturt
1950	Sam Barbary	North Adelaide
1951	Harold Harris	South Adelaide
1952	Wally Southern	Sturt
1953	John Blunden	North Adelaide
1954	Brian Livesey	West Torrens
1955	Fred Stewart	Norwood
1956	Bob Lee	West Adelaide
1957	Ray Panizza	South Adelaide
1958	Bill Wedding	Norwood
1959	Barry Henningsen	North Adelaide
1960	Charles Heading	North Adelaide
1961	Bob Simunsen	Woodville
1962	Bob Simunsen	Woodville
1963	Gary Window	Central District
1964	Ian Della-Polina	Norwood
1965	John Mills	South Adelaide
1966	Brian Woodcock	Norwood
1967	Bob Perry	Woodville
1968	Kevin Rowe	Glenelg
1969	John McInnes	Norwood
1970 tied	John Menz	Norwood
1970 tied	John Baruzzi	Port Adelaide
1971	John McInnes	Norwood
1972	John McInnes	Norwood
1973	Roly Daw	Sturt
1974	Kym Hodgeman	Glenelg
1975	Phil Heinrich	Sturt
1976	Jim Katsaros	Sturt
1977	Graham Sando	South Adelaide
1978	Peter Barnes	West Torrens
1979	Chris Wright	Port Adelaide
1980	Leon Grosser	West Adelaide
1981	Bruce Lindner	West Adelaide
1982	Kym Dillon	West Torrens
1983	Desmond Drogemuller	Port Adelaide
1984	Anthony Owens	West Torrens
1985	Hayden Stephens	Woodville
1986	Scott McDonald	Woodville
1987	John Harvey	Port Adelaide
1988	Adrian Settre	Port Adelaide
1989	Phil Lounder	Central District
1990	Max Gasparroni	West Adelaide
1991	Brodie Atkinson	North Adelaide
1992	Jason Sziller	Woodville-West Torrens
1993	Brendan Roberson	Sturt
1994	Paul Page	South Adelaide
1995	Damian Hicks	Central District
1995	Neil McGoran	Central District
1996	Jason King	Woodville-West Torrens
1997	Mark Ryan	South Adelaide
1998	Jason King	North Adelaide
1999	Ron Lee	West Adelaide
2000	Justin Casserly	Central District
2001	Brenton Daniel	Central District
2002	Josh Coulter	Central District
2003	Hamish Tamlin	Norwood
2003	David Newett	Woodville-West Torrens
2003	Nick Prokopec	Central District
2004	Justin Casserly	North Adelaide
2005	Mark Demasi	South Adelaide
2006	Ryan Lewis	Norwood
2007	Tim Delvins	North Adelaide
2007	James Boyd	South Adelaide
2008	Scott Lewis	Glenelg
2009	Daniel Batson	Port Adelaide
2010	Timothy Milera	Port Adelaide
2011	Tarak Redigolo	South Adelaide
2012	Angus Poole	Woodville-West Torrens
2013	Nick Homburg	West Adelaide
2013	Travis Schiller	Central District
2014	Luke Teasdale	North Adelaide
2015	Matt Appleton	Woodville-West Torrens
2015	Dylan Reinbrecht	Norwood
2016	Lachlan Earl	Glenelg
2016	Jake Comitogianni	Woodville-West Torrens
2017	Louis Sharrad	Port Adelaide
2018	Jacob Templeton	Central District
2019	Jed Spence	Norwood
2020	Dakota Nixon	North Adelaide
2021	Edward Allan	West Adelaide
2022	Kyle Crompton	Glenelg
2023	Charlie Molan	Sturt
2024	Brad Jefferies	Sturt
2025	Blake Hansen	Woodville-West Torrens
2026	Daniel Gauci	Norwood

== External sources ==
- SANFL 2012 Annual Report - Click here and refer to pp. 102 for a list of winners from 1906-2012
- - Scroll down to the Section Reserves Magarey Medal for full list of winners since 1906.
