= Charles Salvana =

Australian sportsman

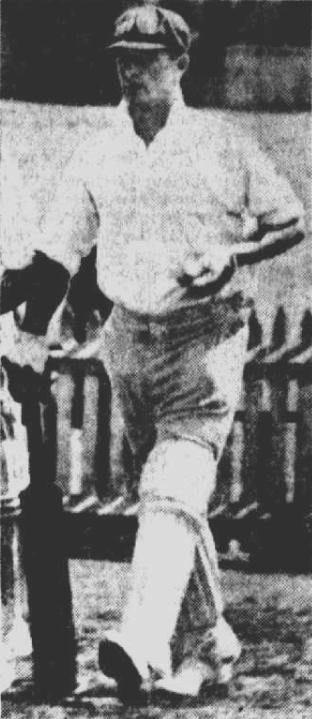

Personal information
- Full name: Louis Charles Salvana
- Nickname: Lou
- Born: 20 January 1897; Camberwell, Victoria
- Died: 8 December 1974 (aged 77); Mitcham, Victoria
- Original team: Prahran
- Height: 183 cm (6 ft 0 in)
- Weight: 77 kg (170 lb)

Playing career^{1}
Years	Club	Games (Goals)
1919	Melbourne	6 (3)
- ^{1} Playing statistics correct to the end of 1919.

Louis Charles Salvana (20 January 1897 – 8 December 1974) was an Australian sportsman who played first-class cricket for Victoria and Australian rules football with Melbourne in the Victorian Football League (VFL). He was known during his football career by his first name Lou and by Charles when he played cricket.

Salvana spent the 1919 VFL season with Melbourne and made six appearances for their seniors that year, all in losses. The Prahran recruit kicked two goals in a game against Carlton at the MCG.

He did not play again after that year and instead turned his attention to cricket, appearing in his first and only first-class cricket match in the 1926/27 summer. The match, a Sheffield Shield encounter against New South Wales, took place at the Sydney Cricket Ground. New South Wales batted first and amassed 469, on the back of an unbeaten 217 by Alan Kippax. Salvana did not bowl but contributed with a catch to dismiss Test player Johnny Taylor. A right-handed batsman, Salvana opened the batting in each of Victoria's innings and made scores of six and a duck. In the second innings he was dismissed by Charlie Macartney, an Australian representative.

== See also ==
- List of Victoria first-class cricketers
