= Csaba Körmöczi =

Hungarian fencer

Personal information
- Born: 28 February 1944 Budapest, Hungary
- Died: 4 November 1992 (aged 48) Koblenz, Germany

Sport
- Sport: Fencing

Csaba Körmöczi (28 February 1944 – 4 November 1992) was a Hungarian fencer. He competed in the team sabre event at the 1976 Summer Olympics.
