= Jim Everett (Australian footballer) =

Australian rules footballer and cricketer

Personal information
- Full name: James Seabrook Everett
- Born: 20 July 1884; Toodyay, Western Australia
- Died: 19 June 1968 (aged 83); Nedlands, Perth
- Original team: Centrals Jnrs

Playing career^{1}
Years	Club	Games (Goals)
1901–1915	West Perth	178 (46)
- ^{1} Playing statistics correct to the end of 1915.

James Seabrook Everett (20 July 1884 – 19 June 1968) was an Australian rules footballer who played with West Perth in the West Australian Football League (WAFL). He also played one first-class match for Western Australia.

== Family ==
The son of George James Everett (1842–1915), and Martha Susannah Everett (1853–1935), née Doust, James Seabrook Everett was born in Toodyay, Western Australia on 20 July 1884. He is the Grandson of English convict James Everett (1814 - 1893) who was transported to Western Australia for his part in a criminal gang in Coggeshall.

He married Agnes Florence Gardiner Robertson (1884–) on 17 May 1913.

== Football ==
Recruited from the Junior team, Perth Central, Everett made his Western Australian Football Association (WAFA) debut in 1901, at the age of 17. FOOTBALL.

He was a member of West Perth's 1905 premiership team, won through a grand final replay, as a centre-half back. In the drawn grand final, Everett had played on a half forward flank.

He was the vice-captain of the West Australian team at the 1908 Melbourne Carnival.

He played his last WAFL game with West Perth in 1915—the WAFA competition had been renamed Western Australian Football League (WAFL) in 1908—before enlisting with the First AIF in October 1915.

== Cricket ==
The first Western Australian to represent his state in both cricket and football, he played his one and only first-class match for the Western Australian cricket team in the 1909/10 season.

The fixture, which took place at the WACA, was played against Victoria. Everett was in the side as a right-arm fast-medium bowler but couldn't take a wicket, finishing with figures of 0/48 off 13 overs in the only innings Western Australia bowled. With the bat he was required twice, coming in at eight in the batting order. He was dismissed by Arthur Kenny in both innings, for 13 and 0.

== Military service ==
Everett enlisted in the First AIF on 6 October 1915, and he served with the 44th Battalion and fought on the Western Front.

Wounded in action on 10 August 1918, he suffered gunshot wounds to his leg and shoulder, and was evacuated to England, where he recovered from his wounds and left England, for Australia, on HMAS Karoola on 13 December 1918, arriving home in January 1919.

== See also ==
- 1908 Melbourne Carnival
