= Donald Watt (sportsman) =

Australian sportsman (1920–2007)

Don Watt
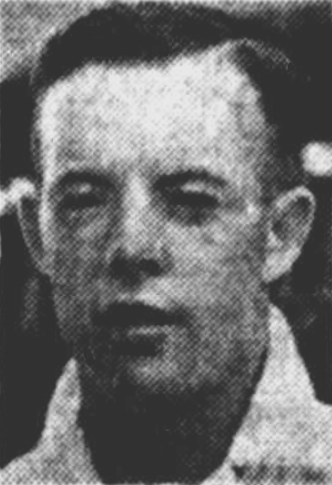

Personal information
- Full name: Donald Watt
- Born: 15 March 1920; Southport, Brisbane, Queensland
- Died: 20 May 2007 (aged 87); Toowoomba, Queensland
- Batting: Right-handed
- Bowling: Leg break, googly
- Role: All-rounder

Domestic team information
- Years: Team
- 1939/40–1945/46: Queensland

Career statistics
Competition	First-class
Matches	13
Runs scored	524
Batting average	23.81
100s/50s	0/4
Top score	59*
Balls bowled	962
Wickets	17
Bowling average	49.29
5 wickets in innings	0
10 wickets in match	0
Best bowling	4/40
Catches/stumpings	6/–
- Source: CricketArchive, 16 November 2022

Donald Watt (15 March 1920 – 20 May 2007) was an Australian first-class cricketer who played for Queensland. He also represented his state in Australian rules football and rugby union.

== Career ==
A middle order batsman and leg spin bowler, Watt made his first appearances in first-class cricket in the 1939/40 Sheffield Shield season. In five matches he struggled with the ball and could only take one wicket at an average of 278 but scored two half centuries. The competition was then suspended due to the war so Watt never got a chance to improve his Shield record. Up until 1945/46, Watt continued to play for Queensland at first-class level and was easily most successful with the ball against New South Wales. He never took a wicket against South Australia, despite conceding 200 runs and only took three wickets at 80.33 in matches against Victoria. However, when it came to New South Wales he managed 14 wickets at 28.35.

Watt, a key forward, played Australian rules football in the Queensland Australian National Football League, during the off-season. An interstate player, he had started out at South Brisbane and then in 1941 was appointed captain of Coorparoo, despite being only 21 years of age. The following year he was also playing rugby league at the high level, as the full-back for the Eastern Suburbs Tigers. He however had more success in rugby union, where his efforts as a lock for Toowoomba got him called up to the Queensland team for an interstate match against rivals New South Wales in 1950, as a reserve forward. Throughout the 1950s he continued the play cricket, in the country, and represented a Queensland Country side in matches against India, the West Indies and South Africa. In 1954 and 1955 he represented Queensland at rugby, including a fixture against Fiji in the former year.
