= Bob Lee (Australian footballer) =

Australian rules footballer and administrator

Personal information
- Full name: Robert William Lee
- Born: 31 January 1927; Hindmarsh, South Australia
- Died: 10 June 2001 (aged 74); Adelaide, South Australia

Playing career^{1}
Years	Club	Games (Goals)
1945–48, 1953–57	West Adelaide (SANFL)	96 (32)
- ^{1} Playing statistics correct to the end of 1959.

Career highlights
- SANFL debut with West Adelaide on 28 April 1945; SANFL Reserves Magarey Medallist 1956; West Adelaide Football Club President 1966-73, 1979-88; West Adelaide Football Club Chairman 1966-73; SANFL League Director 1966-73, 1979-88; SANFL Umpires Board 1974-78 (Chairman 3 years); SANFL Management Committee 1978-89; SANFL Vice President 1981-99; SA representative National Australian Football Council 1981-90; SANFL Football Commission 1998 - 1999; SANFL Life Member 1975; West Adelaide Football Club Life Member; South Australian Football Hall of Fame Inaugural Inductee 2002; West Adelaide Football Club Hall of Fame member; National Australian Football Council Hall of Fame member

Robert William Lee (31 January 1927 – 10 June 2001) was an Australian rules footballer and administrator who played with West Adelaide in the South Australian National Football League (SANFL). He also represented the South Australian cricket team at first-class level in the Sheffield Shield.

== Career ==
Lee managed 96 senior appearances for West Adelaide but it was his post playing contribution to South Australian football that he is remembered for. From 1966 to 1973 and then from 1979 to 1988 he served as the President of the West Adelaide Football Club. He was the SANFL's vice president in a long stint which began in 1981 and ended in 1999. Lee was also a League Director for 18 years, the SANFL Vice Patron, on the Management Committee for 12 years, Chairman of the SANFL Umpires Board for three years and served on the South Australian Football Commission. He also represented football in the state on a national level by standing in the National Australian Football Council as South Australia's representative, from 1981 to 1990 and spending three years at Chairman of Selectors. The Adelaide Football Club of the AFL appointed him to their Board in 1990 and he remained with the club until 1997.

In a brief cricket career he played three first-class cricket matches for South Australia in the late 1950s, as a right-hand batsman specialist batsman. Two of those matches were in the Sheffield Shield competition and in all he made 142 runs at 35.50. The only significant innings of Lee's career was in his debut match, against Tasmania at Hobart when he opened the batting and made 86.

An SANFL life member, Lee was inducted into the South Australian Football Hall of Fame in 2002.

The player judged as Best on Ground during the SANFL Reserves Grand Final wins the Bob Lee Medal.
