= South Brisbane Football Club =

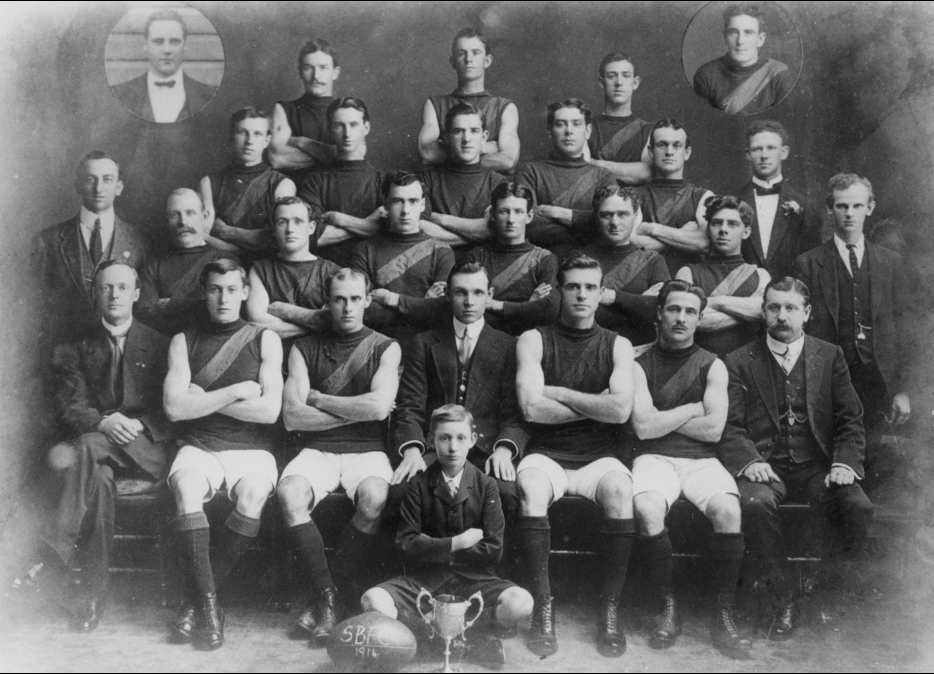
South Brisbane, QAFL premiers 1914

South Brisbane Football Club was an Australian rules club which competed in the Queensland Football League. They joined the league in 1910 and played in it until 1940 with the exception of the 1925 season which they sat out. Notable players include Brian O'Connor, Harry Pegg and Donald Watt.

== Honours ==
Premierships (4)

- 1910
- 1911
- 1914
- 1921
