= Harry Pegg =

Australian sportsman

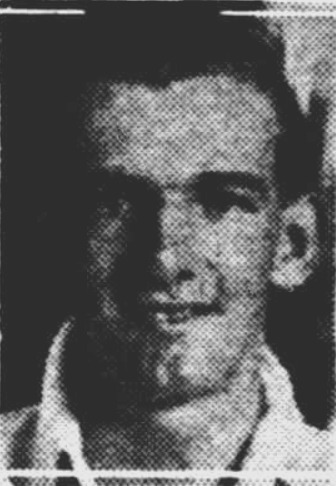
- Pegg in 1943

Personal information
- Full name: Harry Robert Edgar Pegg
- Born: 19 March 1916; Brisbane, Queensland, Australia
- Died: 17 October 2010 (aged 94); Brisbane, Queensland, Australia
- Batting: Right-handed
- Role: Batsman/Wicket-keeper

Domestic team information
- Years: Team
- 1945/46–1946/47: Queensland

Career statistics
Competition	First-class
Matches	2
Runs scored	7
Batting average	2.33
100s/50s	0/0
Top score	4
Catches/stumpings	1/0
- Source: CricketArchive, 20 April 2023

Harry R. E. Pegg (19 March 1916 – 17 October 2010) was an Australian sportsman who represented Queensland in both Australian rules football and first-class cricket.

An interstate football representative, Pegg was one of the leading player in the Queensland Australian National Football League (QANFL) in the late 1930s and early 1940s. He was made captain of South Brisbane in 1939 and two years later crossed to Windsor.

Pegg was 29 when made his first-class cricket debut for Queensland, against the Don Bradman captained South Australian team at Adelaide Oval in 1945/46. Although he was a wicket-keeper in grade cricket, Pegg was picked as a specialist batsman. He was only required to bat once but failed to score, falling leg before wicket to Tom Klose. The Queenslanders next went to Sydney to play a match against New South Wales, with Pegg the 12th man. During the first day, keeper Don Tallon injured his shoulder while batting and a request was made to New South Wales leader Bill O'Reilly for Pegg to keep wicket in his place, which was agreed. Although it didn't count towards his first-class record, Pegg took five catches in the first innings. His only other first-class appearance was in a Sheffield Shield match the following summer, again as a batsman. Playing against New South Wales at the Brisbane Cricket Ground, Pegg could only manage four runs. He batted down at seven in the second innings but again struggled, falling to Ernie Toshack for three. He made a comeback to football in 1949, when he signed up with QANFL club Yeronga.
