= Bao Jiaping =

Chinese footballer (1908–1992)

Personal information
- Date of birth: 10 August 1908
- Date of death: 11 November 1992 (aged 84)

International career
| Years | Team | Apps | (Gls) |
| 1927–1936 | China | 3 | (0) |

Bao Jiaping (10 August 1908 – 11 November 1992) was a Chinese footballer. He competed in the men's tournament at the 1936 Summer Olympics.
