= Aub Charleston =

Australian rules footballer, born 1901

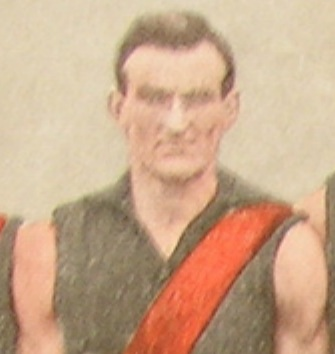
- Charleston in 1928

Personal information
- Full name: Aubrey James Charleston
- Born: 22 November 1901; Devonport, Tasmania
- Died: 5 August 1985 (aged 83); Devonport, Tasmania
- Original team: Ulverstone
- Height: 185 cm (6 ft 1 in)
- Weight: 86 kg (190 lb)

Playing career^{1}
Years	Club	Games (Goals)
1924–1925	Carlton	13 (3)
1926–1930	Coburg (VFA)	79 (15)
1928	Essendon	9 (0)
- ^{1} Playing statistics correct to the end of 1928.

Aubrey James Charleston (22 November 1901 – 5 August 1985) was an Australian rules footballer who played for the Carlton Football Club and Essendon Football Club in the Victorian Football League (VFL).
