= Alan Peel =

Australian rules footballer, born 1908

Personal information
- Full name: Alan Henry Peel
- Born: 29 December 1908; Benalla, Victoria
- Died: 23 November 1992 (aged 83)
- Original team: Brunswick Amateurs

Playing career^{1}
Years	Club	Games (Goals)
1932–1933	St Kilda	4 (1)
- ^{1} Playing statistics correct to the end of 1933.

Alan Henry Peel (29 December 1908 – 23 November 1992) was an Australian rules footballer who played for the St Kilda Football Club in the Victorian Football League (VFL).

He later served in the Australian Army during World War II.
