= Mick Schade =

Australian rules footballer

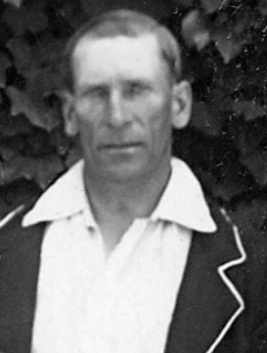

Personal information
- Full name: Mattias Anderson Schade
- Born: 25 March 1887; Huntly, Victoria
- Died: 9 June 1958 (aged 71); Williamstown, Victoria
- Original team: North Melbourne Juniors

Playing career^{1}
Years	Club	Games (Goals)
1911	Richmond	2 (1)
- ^{1} Playing statistics correct to the end of 1911.

Mattias Anderson "Mick" Schade (25 March 1887 – 9 June 1958) was an Australian rules footballer who played with Richmond in the Victorian Football League (VFL).

He made two appearances for Richmond, both in the 1911 VFL season.

Later, in the 1921/22 Sheffield Shield season, Schade played a first-class cricket match for Victoria against South Australia at Adelaide Oval. A right-arm fast-medium opening bowler, Schade took 1/35 in a convincing innings and 232 runs win.

== See also ==
- List of Victoria first-class cricketers
