= Bob Simunsen =

Australian rules footballer and cricketer

Personal information
- Full name: Robert Francis Simunsen
- Born: 7 June 1941 (age 85); Adelaide, South Australia
- Position: Centreman

Playing career^{1}
Years	Club	Games (Goals)
1964–1971	Woodville	145 (71)
- ^{1} Playing statistics correct to the end of 1971.

Bob Simunsen
Cricket information
- Batting: Left-handed
- Role: Batsman

Domestic team information
- Years: Team
- 1972/73: South Australia

Career statistics
Competition	First-class	List A
Matches	4	1
Runs scored	103	12
Batting average	20.60	12.00
100s/50s	–/1	–/–
Top score	58	12
Balls bowled	8	–
Wickets	0	–
Bowling average	–	–
5 wickets in innings	–	–
10 wickets in match	–	–
Best bowling	–	–
Catches/stumpings	3/–	–/–
- Source: Cricinfo, 18 May 2026

Robert 'Bob' Simunsen (born 7 June 1941, in Adelaide) is a former Australian rules footballer who played with Woodville in the South Australian National Football League (SANFL). A talented cricketer, he also played some first-class cricket matches in the Sheffield Shield for South Australia.

Simunsen, a centreman, was with Woodville from their inaugural SANFL season in 1964. For the previous five years he had played for the club in the SANFL 'B' competition as Woodville, along with Central District, where required to serve an apprenticeship before being admitted. He won two Reserves Magarey Medals, in 1961 and 1962, and was also runner up in the award twice.

When they joined the top flight in 1964, Simunsen was made captain and he won their 'Best and fairest' that year. He went on to win further 'Best and fairest' awards in 1965 and 1966, also finishing second in the 1966 Magarey Medal to Ron Kneebone. Simunsen represented South Australia at interstate football for the first time in 1965, against Victoria, and also appeared at the 1966 Hobart Carnival. Although he didn't continue on as Woodville captain after the initial season, Simunsen had another stint in 1971.

His four cricket matches came during the 1972/73 Sheffield Shield season where he played as a left-handed batsman, making 103 runs at 20.60. This included a half century on debut, against John Benaud's New South Wales at the Adelaide Oval. Simunsen, batting in the same side as the Chappell brothers and Pakistani Test cricketer Younis Ahmed, made 58 in his second innings before being bowled by Kerry O'Keeffe.
