= Brian O'Connor (cricketer) =

Australian cricketer (1913–1963)

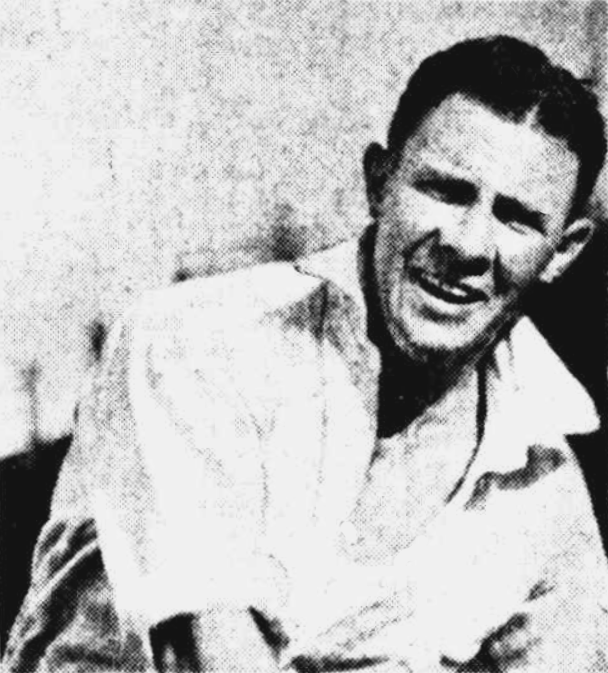

Personal information
- Full name: Brian Redmond Devereaux O'Connor
- Born: 5 July 1913; South Brisbane, Queensland
- Died: 17 December 1963 (aged 50); Red Hill, Brisbane, Queensland
- Batting: Right-handed
- Bowling: Right-arm fast-medium
- Role: Bowler

Domestic team information
- Years: Team
- 1934/35–1935/36: Queensland

Career statistics
Competition	First-class
Matches	5
Runs scored	83
Batting average	11.85
100s/50s	0/0
Top score	20
Balls bowled	760
Wickets	6
Bowling average	75.00
5 wickets in innings	0
10 wickets in match	0
Best bowling	2/72
Catches/stumpings	2/–
- Source: CricketArchive, 16 November 2022

Brian Redmond Devereaux O'Connor (5 July 1913 – 17 December 1963) was an Australian first-class cricketer who played Sheffield Shield cricket for Queensland.

== Biography ==
O'Connor, a right-arm fast-medium opening bowler and lower order batsman, made four of his five first-class matches in the 1934/35 Sheffield Shield season. He struggled on his debut, against South Australia at the Brisbane Cricket Ground, going wicket-less in the first innings and conceding 80 runs off just 13 overs. In the second innings he dismissed opener Vic Richardson and then helped Queensland win the match by scoring 11 not out from nine in the batting order, securing a narrow three wicket victory.

His next appearance was at the Melbourne Cricket Ground against Victoria and he was more successful with the ball, claiming 2/72, with the wickets of Leo O'Brien and Len Darling. The Queenslanders were outplayed on this occasions and were unable to score enough runs to make the Victorians bat a second time. He again played against South Australia for his third Shield match, this time at Adelaide Oval. In statistically his worst bowling effort, he finished with 0/120 off only 17 overs in South Australia's first innings, as each of their top four batsmen scored centuries. Chasing a small total, the home side won by eight wickets, with O'Connor picking up the wicket of Frank Collins. In his last Sheffield Shield appearance, O'Connor was part of the Queensland team which played New South Wales at the Sydney Cricket Ground. His only contribution was the wicket of Ted white, caught and bowled.

The following summer, O'Connor was called into the team to play the Marylebone Cricket Club in Brisbane. He opening the bowling with Eddie Gilbert in the MCC's only innings and took 1/54, with Joe Hardstaff his wicket. After being run-out for 13 in his first innings, O'Connor posted his highest score in the second, making 20 before he was sent back to the pavilion. Although he never again played for Queensland, O'Connor continued to compete at grade level for Eastern Suburbs and topped the bowling averages in 1939/40.

He was the only son of Leo O'Connor, a Queensland cricket captain who also led his state in Australian rules football interstate matches. Like his father, O'Connor was a Queensland representative in both sports. He played for South Brisbane in the Queensland Australian National Football League. They were not his only sports, he also played rugby union with the GPS Rugby Club.

During the war, O'Connor served as a pilot with the Royal Australian Air Force. He flew a Hampden torpedo bomber with the 455 Squadron, where he was a Squadron Leader.
