= Jack Nash (Australian cricketer) =

Australian cricketer (born 1950)

Personal information
- Full name: John Eric Nash
- Born: 16 April 1950 (age 76); Adelaide, Australia
- Batting: Right-handed
- Role: Batsman

Domestic team information
- Years: Team
- 1970/71-1980/81: South Australia

Career statistics
Competition	First-class	List A
Matches	51	7
Runs scored	2624	105
Batting average	28.52	15.00
100s/50s	3/16	–/–
Top score	134	45
Balls bowled	30	–
Wickets	–	–
Bowling average	–	–
5 wickets in innings	–	–
10 wickets in match	–	–
Best bowling	–	–
Catches/stumpings	30/–	3/–
- Source: Cricinfo, 18 September 2020

John Eric Nash (born 16 April 1950) is an Australian former cricketer and Australian rules footballer, playing 51 first-class and seven List A matches for South Australia between 1970 and 1981 and 22 games between 1969 and 1972 for Norwood Football Club in the South Australian National Football League.

During the late 1970s, when many of Australia's top cricketers were playing in World Series Cricket, Nash was considered a possibility to make the Australian side, yet by 1981 Nash's form had fallen away to the point he had been relegated to Sturt Cricket Club's B side.

Nash's son Jay Nash was a South Australian cricket youth representative.

== See also ==
- List of South Australian representative cricketers
