= Libby Waye =

Australian sportsman

Personal information
- Full name: Libby Sibly Waye
- Born: 14 January 1885; Willunga, South Australia
- Died: 10 June 1951 (aged 66); Frewville, Adelaide

Playing career^{1}
Years	Club	Games (Goals)
1903	Sturt	1 (2)
1907–1910	West Torrens	48 (57)
1911–1914	South Adelaide	41 (23)
Total		90 (82)
- ^{1} Playing statistics correct to the end of 1914.

Libby Waye
Career statistics
Competition	First-class
Matches	1
Runs scored	2
Batting average	1.00
100s/50s	0/0
Top score	2
Balls bowled	12
Wickets	0
Bowling average	–
5 wickets in innings	–
10 wickets in match	–
Best bowling	–
Catches/stumpings	1/–
- Source: Cricinfo, 6 December 2022

Libby Sibly Waye (14 January 1885 – 10 June 1951) was an Australian sportsman who represented South Australia in cricket and played in the South Australian Football League for West Torrens and South Adelaide.

Waye was the leading goal-kicker for West Torrens in the 1907 season, with 21 goals. He continued playing with the club until 1911, when he joined South Adelaide. Waye was also a member of the South Adelaide committee.

His success in grade cricket earned him a call up to the South Australian cricket team in the 1912-13 Sheffield Shield season, for a first-class match against Victoria at the Melbourne Cricket Ground. Waye batted at 10 in the first innings, yet was only the seventh bowler used and bowled just one over when it came to South Australia's time to field. He was promoted to five in the second innings but made a duck, to go with his earlier score of two.

Waye, who worked as a postal employee, fought on the Western Front with the 12th Battalion of the First Australian Imperial Force during World War I.
