= Aub Carrigan =

Australian cricketer (1917–2012)

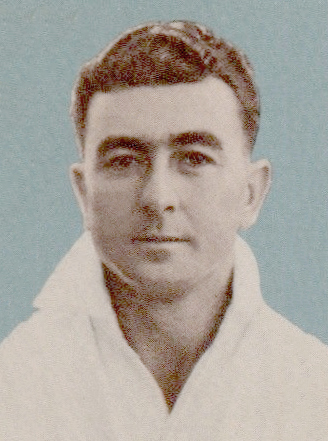
- A cigarette card of Carrington from about 1948

Personal information
- Full name: Aubrey Herbert Carrigan
- Born: 26 August 1917; Zillmere, Queensland, Australia
- Died: 23 May 2012 (aged 94); Brisbane, Queensland, Australia
- Batting: Right-handed
- Bowling: Right-arm medium
- Role: Batsman

Domestic team information
- Years: Team
- 1945/46–1951/52: Queensland

Career statistics
Competition	First-class
Matches	50
Runs scored	2,883
Batting average	35.59
100s/50s	4/20
Top score	169
Balls bowled	3,228
Wickets	31
Bowling average	47.06
5 wickets in innings	0
10 wickets in match	0
Best bowling	4/95
Catches/stumpings	21/–
- Source: CricketArchive, 16 November 2022

Aubrey Herbert Carrigan (26 August 1917 – 23 May 2012) was an Australian first-class cricketer who played with Queensland in the Sheffield Shield. He was born at Zillmere, Queensland.

== Career ==
Carrigan, a middle order batsman and part-time medium pace bowler, made his first-class debut in the 1945/46 season but had to wait until the following summer to make his first Sheffield Shield appearance as the competition had been in recess due to the war. It wasn't until his 20th first-class match that he made a century, an innings of 166 against South Australia in Brisbane, although he had previously amassed a pair of 90s.

His bowling was used to good effect on occasions and he claimed 14 wickets at 30.92 in 1948/49. During his career he dismissed batsman to the calibre of Neil Harvey and Arthur Morris.

== Captaincy ==
After filling in for two matches in 1950/51, Carrigan was Queensland's captain for the entire 1951/52 Sheffield Shield season, where they finished equal second on the points table. He also had the distinction of captaining his state to a first-class win over the touring West Indians, who had won their last two Test series in India and England. They played a four-day match, as a warm-up for the 1st Test at the Brisbane Cricket Ground later in the week. A six-wicket haul to Colin McCool restricted the tourists to just 198 in their first innings and Queensland, in reply, would amass 455 runs. Carrigan had come to the crease at 2–184 and went on to score 169 of the remaining 271 runs, before being bowled by Gerry Gomez, with a new highest first-class score. The West Indies again struggled in the second innings, with another six-wicket performance, this time to Mick Raymer, leaving the Queenslanders requiring just 29 runs to win, which they achieved without losing a wicket.

It was his last summer with Queensland and he spent the 1952 off-season in England playing for the Church and Oswaldtwistle Cricket Club in the Lancashire League.

== Australian football ==
Carrigan was also a noted Australian rules footballer in Queensland Australian National Football League. He played as a wingman for Windsor and joined Leo O'Connor as the only Queensland cricket captains to represent the state at Australian football.
