= Col Kinnear =

Australian rules footballer and coach

Personal information
- Full name: Colin Kinnear
- Born: 10 January 1947 (age 79)
- Original team: UHSOB

Coaching career
Years	Club	Games (W–L–D)
1989–1991	Sydney Swans	66 (23–42–1)

Colin 'Col' Kinnear (born 10 January 1947) is a former Australian rules football coach who coached the Sydney Swans in the VFL/AFL. He is the son of former Melbourne player Joe Kinnear.

Kinnear played amateur football in Melbourne during the 1960s through University High School Old Boys until two knee operations forced him into premature retirement, leading to his first taste of coaching and also premiership success. However, Kinnear was an outstanding cricketer too, initially taking him to London, after his football playing career ended, amid a stint for Middlesex Second XI. He would return to play Melbourne district cricket for Carlton that included wicketkeeping in three district premierships.

Kinnear started his coaching career at VFA club Coburg in charge of the reserves before coaching the seniors in 1977 until the end of the 1980 season. Kinnear impressed enough to be appointed the VFL reserves coach of North Melbourne from 1981 until 1983. He then joined Carlton in 1984, steering its reserves to premierships in 1986 and 1987 among four consecutive grand finals. He was also assistant coach of Carlton's seniors during this period and helped them to the 1987 VFL premiership.

In 1989, he replaced Tom Hafey as coach of the Sydney Swans and the club finished a respectable seventh in his first year in charge. They struggled over the next two seasons and in 1992 Kinnear lost his job to Gary Buckenara.

He returned to Carlton after his Sydney stint ended and served the Blues in a variety of positions, including Chairman of the Match Committee, Football Manager, General Manager of Football Operations and General Manager of Special Projects.
