= Bassens =

Bassens is the name of two communes in France:

- Bassens, Gironde, in the Gironde département
- Bassens, Savoie, in the Savoie département
