= He Cheng =

People's Liberation Army lieutenant general

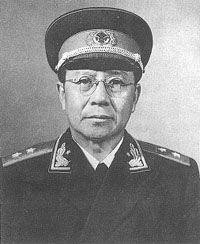
He Cheng (1958)

He Cheng (Chinese: 贺诚; 1901 – 8 November 1992), birth name He Zonglin (Chinese: 贺宗霖), was a People's Liberation Army lieutenant general and the PRC's first vice-minister of health. He was born in Shehong county in Sichuan. He joined the Chinese Communist Party in 1925. He participated in the Northern Expedition and the Guangzhou Uprising.
