= Howard Mutton =

Australian cricketer

Personal information
- Born: 21 October 1924; Adelaide, Australia
- Died: 20 November 1992 (aged 68); Adelaide, Australia
- Source: Cricinfo, 23 August 2020

Howard Mutton (21 October 1924 – 20 November 1992) was an Australian cricketer. He played in five first-class matches for South Australia in 1959/60.

== See also ==
- List of South Australian representative cricketers
