= William Wilson (sportsman, born 1909) =

Australian rules footballer (1909–1976)

Personal information
- Full name: William Young Wilson
- Born: 13 December 1909; Moonee Ponds, Victoria, Australia
- Died: 30 September 1976 (aged 66); Ascot Vale, Victoria
- Original team: Ascot Vale Presbyterians
- Height: 184 cm (6 ft 0 in)
- Weight: 83 kg (183 lb)

Playing career^{1}
Years	Club	Games (Goals)
1932–1935	Essendon	30 (7)
- ^{1} Playing statistics correct to the end of 1935.

William Young Wilson (13 December 1909 – 30 September 1976) was an Australian sportsman who played first-class cricket with Victoria and Australian rules football for Essendon in the Victorian Football League (VFL).

Nicknamed 'Weary', Wilson was recruited to Essendon from Ascot Vale Presbyterians and made his VFL debut in 1932. After 30 games he left Essendon and turned his attention to cricket and played three first-class cricket matches in the 1935/36 season. He was a right-arm fast-medium pace bowler and took seven wickets at 38.28 in those matches. His best performance came in a Sheffield Shield encounter against South Australia at the Adelaide Oval when he took 3/122 in the first innings.

== See also ==
- List of Victoria first-class cricketers
