= Jack Chamberlain (sportsman) =

Australian sportsman

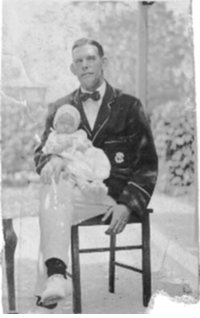
- John (Jack) Chamberlain, with his youngest daughter, Annette

Personal information
- Full name: John Aloysius Chamberlain
- Born: 29 August 1884; Glanville, South Australia
- Died: 1 April 1941 (aged 56); Leabrook, South Australia
- Original team: Paddington Football Club

Playing career^{1}
Years	Club	Games (Goals)
1904, 1906–07	Perth	16 (?)
1908–09, 1914	Norwood	17 (32)
- ^{1} Playing statistics correct to the end of 1914.

John Aloysius Chamberlain (29 August 1884 – 1 April 1941) was an Australian sportsman who played Australian rules football, cricket and rugby union at a high level.

== Family ==
The son of Edmund Chamberlain (1827–1891), and Mary Ann Chamberlain (-1916), John Aloysius Chamberlain was born in Glanville, South Australia on 29 August 1884.

He married Vera Evelyn Ellen Sedgley (1898–1982) on 7 February 1920. They had three daughters: twins, Helen, and Joan Mary, and their younger sister, Annette.

Two of his brothers, Cornelius and Leonard, were also gifted sportsmen, who also played league football with Norwood and first-class cricket for South Australia.

== Employment ==
He was employed by the Eastern Extension Telegraph Company for 27 years, and for four years or so, was stationed overseas at various locations in East Asia, including Singapore, Cochin-China, and the Cocos Islands.

In late 1929, he moved to Eudunda, and took over the license of the Royal Hotel. He left Eudunda and moved to Leabrook, in Adelaide in late 1940.

== Sport ==
=== Cricket ===
Chamberlain played cricket in the summer and played one first-class match for Western Australia against New South Wales in March 1907.

Chamberlain played for Norwood initially in 1909; but, during the year, he was relocated to Singapore through his work with the Eastern Extension Telegraph Company. While in Singapore he played rugby union and represented the Crown colony in fixtures again the Malay State.

While serving in Singapore, he played for the Straits Settlements cricket team, appearing in four matches against the Federated Malay States between 1910 and 1913.

=== Soccer ===
He took up soccer when he moved to Perth in 1904; but gave it away in 1906 to play Australian Rules Football for Perth.

=== Australian Rules football ===
After spending some time in Tasmania, Chamberlain moved to Sydney at the age of 17 and played Australian rules football for Paddington. During this time, he twice represented New South Wales at interstate football.

Although initially playing soccer on his move to Perth in 1904, he abandoned soccer in 1906 and began playing Australian Rules once more with the Perth Football Club in the West Australian Football Association.

In 1908 he signed with the Norwood Football Club in the South Australian Football League. Playing as a forward, Chamberlain kicked 30 goals to top his club's goalkicking and fall just three short of league leader John Mathison from Port Adelaide.

He participated in the 1908 Challenge Final, which Norwood lost narrowly, and represented South Australia in that year's Melbourne Carnival. Due to his employment transfer to Singapore, he only played for part of the 1909 season. In 1914, while on leave, Chamberlain played again with Norwood.

=== Rugby Union ===
While in Singapore he played rugby union and represented the Crown colony in fixtures against the Malay State.

=== Lawn bowls ===
In later life, Chamberlain played lawn bowls at a high level for many years with the Toorak Bowling Club (in Toorak Gardens, South Australia). In 1926, he won the South Australian single bowls championship, and, in 1930, having moved to Eudunda, Chamberlain won the South Australian country singles bowls championship.

== Death ==
He died (suddenly) at his home in Leabrook, South Australia on 1 April 1941.

== See also ==
- 1908 Melbourne Carnival
- List of Western Australia first-class cricketers
