= Mick Clingly =

Australian rules footballer and cricketer

Personal information
- Full name: Michael Thomas Clingly
- Born: 18 April 1932; Prospect, South Australia
- Died: 16 August 2004 (aged 72); Adelaide
- Position: Centre half forward/back

Playing career^{1}
Years	Club	Games (Goals)
1951–1959	West Torrens	156 (219)
- ^{1} Playing statistics correct to the end of 1959.

Michael Thomas Clingly (18 April 1932 – 16 August 2004) was an Australian rules footballer who played for West Torrens in the South Australian National Football League (SANFL). He also represented South Australia at Sheffield Shield cricket.

Clingly played mainly at either centre half forward or centre half back. He was West Torrens's leading goal-kicker three times during his career and was voted best afield from the back pocket in their 1953 premiership team. In a game against Glenelg, in 1956, Clingly kicked 12 goals and became the last player in the league to use the place kick.

His five first-class cricket matches for South Australia were spent as a left-arm medium-pacer. He took nine wickets at 54.33 with a best of 3 for 15 against Queensland at the Adelaide Oval.

On 16 August 2004, Clingly died after suffering a heart attack.

== See also ==
- List of South Australian representative cricketers
