= Basil Onyons =

Australian rules footballer and cricketer

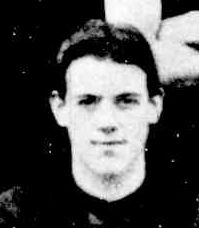

Personal information
- Full name: Basil Austin Onyons
- Born: 14 March 1887; Windsor, Melbourne, Australia
- Died: 31 May 1967 (aged 80); Glen Iris, Melbourne, Australia
- Batting: Right-handed
- Role: Batsman

Domestic team information
- Years: Team
- 1919–1929: Victoria

Career statistics
Competition	First-class
Matches	11
Runs scored	997
Batting average	62.31
100s/50s	6/3
Top score	136
Balls bowled	32
Wickets	0
Bowling average	–
5 wickets in innings	–
10 wickets in match	–
Best bowling	–
Catches/stumpings	3/0
- Source: CricketArchive, 15 August 2022

Basil Austin Onyons (14 March 1887 – 31 May 1967) was an Australian first-class cricketer who represented Victoria.

Onyons was originally an Australian rules footballer and played for the Melbourne Football Club in the Victorian Football League (VFL) between 1905 and 1908. He kicked 32 goals from his 37 games, with 16 of them coming in the 1906 season which was the most by a Melbourne player that year.

A right-handed batsman who often opened the innings, Onyons made an inauspicious first-class cricket debut, bagging a pair at the Sydney Cricket Ground on 25 January 1919 against NSW.

He didn't play another first-class match until exactly eight years later when he captained Victoria in a game against Tasmania at the MCG. Despite batting at number eight down the order he made 128.

In a good 1928/29 Sheffield Shield season, Onyons made 582 runs at 72.75 with four hundreds from four games.
