= Mervyn Bessen =

Australian sportsman

Personal information
- Full name: Mervyn Oscar Bessen
- Born: 29 August 1913; Tambellup, Western Australia
- Died: 13 July 2002 (aged 88); Mandurah, Western Australia
- Education: Albany High School

Sport
- Sport: Australian rules football, cricket
- Team: Subiaco (football); Western Australia (cricket)

Mervyn Oscar Bessen (29 August 1913 – 13 July 2002) was an Australian sportsman who played both Australian rules football and cricket at high levels. He played senior football for Subiaco in the Western Australian National Football League (WANFL), as well as one match of first-class cricket for Western Australia.

Bessen was born in Tambellup, Western Australia, a small town in the state's Great Southern region. He attended Albany High School. Bessen was recruited to the Subiaco Football Club for the 1937 WANFL season, and played twelve games after making his debut in round two. He kicked 18 goals, including six in one game against East Perth, but did not return to the WANFL the following season. A left-handed middle-order batsman, Bessen played his sole match of first-class cricket in March 1938, appearing for Western Australia against an Australian XI on its way to a tour of England. In the match, played at the WACA Ground, he scored 39 runs in the first innings and one run in the second, with his team losing by an innings and 126 runs.
