= Garney Goodrick =

Australian sportsman

Personal information
- Full name: Garnet Gordon Goodrick
- Born: 19 February 1895; Franklin, Tasmania
- Died: 26 January 1929 (aged 33); South Melbourne, Victoria
- Original team: North Hobart

Playing career^{1}
Years	Club	Games (Goals)
1923–1925	Carlton	21 (5)
- ^{1} Playing statistics correct to the end of 1925.

Garnet Gordon Goodrick (19 February 1895 – 26 January 1929) was an Australian sportsman who played first-class cricket for Tasmania and Australian rules football with Carlton in the Victorian Football League (VFL).

Goodrick was born in Tasmania and played his early football at North Hobart and New Town before being recruited by Carlton. He made 21 appearances and kicked five goals for Carlton, over the 1923, 1924 and 1925 VFL seasons. After leaving Carlton he joined the Northcote Football Club.

His only first-class cricket match came in February 1923, before he joined Carlton and took place at the Melbourne Cricket Ground. Playing against Victoria, Goodrick batted in the middle order and made scores of one and 20 in his two innings. He then conceded 114 runs from his 22 overs as Victoria amassed a record first-class score of 1059 all out, 429 of which came from Bill Ponsford.

== See also ==
- List of Tasmanian representative cricketers
