= Leo O'Connor (cricketer) =

Australian cricketer (1890–1985)

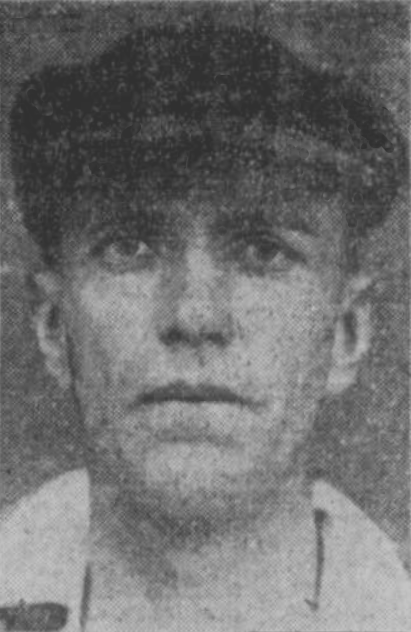

Personal information
- Full name: Leo Patrick Devereaux O'Connor
- Born: 11 April 1890
- Died: 16 January 1985 (aged 94)
- Batting: Right-handed
- Relatives: Brian O'Connor (son)

Domestic team information
- Years: Team
- 1912/13–1929/30: Queensland Bulls
- FC debut: 31 January 1913 Queensland v New South Wales
- Last FC: 17 January 1930 Queensland v South Australia

Career statistics
Competition	First-class
Matches	46
Runs scored	3,311
Batting average	39.89
100s/50s	9/13
Top score	196
Catches/stumpings	82/21
- Source: CricketArchive, 16 November 2022

Leo Patrick Devereaux O'Connor (11 April 1890 – 16 January 1985) was an Australian first-class cricketer and Australian rules footballer. Best known for cricket, he captained and kept wicket for Queensland in the Sheffield Shield. However he also played 10 games with Essendon Football Club and was captain of the Queensland Australian rules football team between 1919-1922.

He was the first person to captain Queensland in both Australian rules football and cricket. His son, Brian O'Connor, also played both cricket and Australian rules football for Queensland.

He became a councillor for the Shire of Fern Tree Gully in 1958.

== Early life and football ==
Raised in Warracknabeal, Victoria he debuted with Essendon in the VFL in 1910 before moving to Queensland in 1911 where he captained the Valleys team in the Queensland Australian Football League from 1919-24. He was named captain of the Queensland team between 1919 and 1922.

== Cricket ==
He made his first appearance for Queensland in 1913 and was a regular for the state whenever they played a first class match over the following decade and a half. When Queensland made their Sheffield Shield debut in 1926-27 O'Connor was named as their inaugural captain.

Their first game was against New South Wales at Brisbane and with Queensland set 400 to win in the 4th innings he opened the batting and made 196 before being run out. He had been the last wicket to fall and Queensland fell just 8 runs short of the target.

Queensland travelled to Sydney the following week to play their away fixture and O'Connor scored a century in both innings, thus becoming the first Queenslander to do so in Shield history. It would be a good season for O'Connor with the bat, he finished with 731 runs at 66.45.

== Councillor of Fern Tree Gully Shire ==
O'Connor became a councillor for the Shire of Fern Tree Gully in 1958, winning the eastern riding seat by a record margin of 1274 votes. He had campaigned across the shire with the ambition of making council "sane and business-like" so that "all ridings may enjoy lower rates".

One councillor remarked that the result reflected a widespread dissatisfaction among ratepayers towards the administration of the shire.

He played an instrumental role in reducing the minimum allotment size in the western part of the shire by approximately 22%. Finalised in November 1958, this affected the present-day suburbs of Wantirna, Wantirna South, Scoresby, Knoxfield, Rowville, Bayswater and Boronia.

It was highly controversial, as many residents believed it would lead to overdevelopment and undermine the area's natural beauty. An unprecedented building boom followed, which became so intense that the State Government intervened with a sweeping interim development order.

Campaign ad in Menzies Creek, 1958

Though short-lived, the boom produced many financially efficient (yet functionally deficient) subdivisions characterised by tract-style layouts with narrow streets and little-to-no open space.

Councillor John Barnes had unsuccessfully tried to reduce the minimum size to 12% about a month prior to O'Conner's reintroduction of the issue. Barnes speculatively owned a large part of the land which is today Knoxfield.

The reduction enabled him to sell more lots on his development, the Mountain Views estate, which is located at the northwestern corner of Ferntree Gully and Scoresby Roads.
