= Bryan Cosgrave =

Australian rules footballer

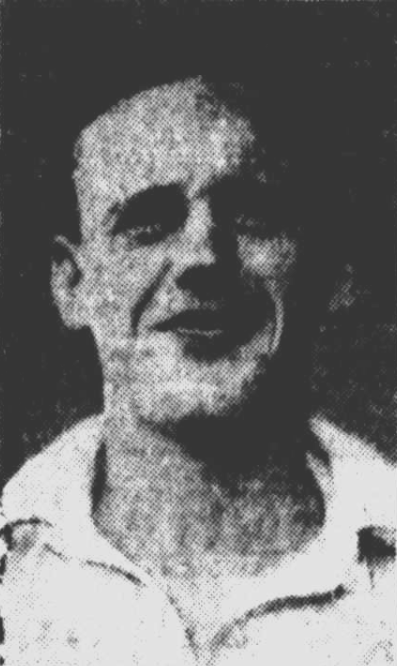

Personal information
- Full name: Bryan Cosgrave
- Born: 23 March 1903; Clifton Hill, Victoria
- Died: 22 November 1992 (aged 89); Melbourne, Victoria
- Batting: Right-handed
- Role: Batsman

Domestic team information
- Years: Team
- 1925/26–1931/32: Victoria

Career statistics
Competition	First-class
Matches	4
Runs scored	178
Batting average	29.66
100s/50s	1/0
Top score	100
Catches/stumpings	2/–
- Source: CricketArchive, 31 December 2014

Bryan Cosgrave (23 March 1903 – 22 November 1992) was an Australian sportsman who played first-class cricket for Victoria and Australian rules football in the Victorian Football League (VFL) with Fitzroy.

In the 1924 VFL season, Cosgrave played five games and kicked four goals for Fitzroy. It was his only season and he turned his attention to cricket. He was a right-handed batsman top order batsman and made 178 from his four first-class matches, with 100 of them coming in an innings against Tasmania at Hobart in 1931–32.

Cosgrave was also a journalist for The Sporting Globe, contributing VFL match reports from 1934 to 1937. In print, his name was occasionally misspelled as Brian Cosgrave.

His son James played cricket with Victoria briefly in the 1956–57 season.
