= Leonard Chamberlain =

Australian rules footballer and cricketer

Personal information
- Full name: William Leonard Chamberlain
- Born: 15 January 1889; Port Adelaide, South Australia
- Died: 21 March 1956 (aged 67); Darlinghurst, New South Wales
- Batting: Right-handed
- Bowling: Right-arm medium
- Role: All-rounder

Domestic team information
- Years: Team
- 1907/08–1913/14: South Australia

Career statistics
Competition	First-class
Matches	19
Runs scored	775
Batting average	22.14
100s/50s	1/2
Top score	103
Balls bowled	1,329
Wickets	18
Bowling average	41.72
5 wickets in innings	0
10 wickets in match	0
Best bowling	3/36
Catches/stumpings	18/–
- Source: , 20 April 2023

William Leonard Chamberlain (15 January 1889 – 21 March 1956) was an Australian first-class cricketer who played Sheffield Shield cricket for South Australia. He was also an Australian rules footballer for Norwood in the South Australian Football League (SAFL).

An all-rounder, Chamberlain got his first called up to the South Australian team in the 1907/08 cricket season, when he played against the touring Marylebone Cricket Club in a first-class fixtures. Chamberlain, who dismissed Test player Jack Crawford for his maiden wicket, made his Sheffield Shield debut three weeks later. He participated in South Australia's 1912/13 Shield winning campaign, scoring 166 runs and taking eight wickets from his three matches. His wickets tally was the third highest for South Australia but perhaps his best moment came with the bat when he came in at five and amassed 103 in just 130 minutes against New South Wales at Adelaide Oval.

Chamberlain was a member of Norwood's 1907 premiership team, in his first season at the club. He kicked 27 goals for the year to top their goal-kicking. The following season he was joined at Norwood by his brother Jack and they played together in the 1908 Challenge Final, which Norwood lost by just three points. Chamberlain was controversially denied a free kick in front of goals in the dying seconds, which would likely have given Norwood back to back premierships. He topped Norwood's goal-kicking on two more occasions, with 19 goals in 1910 and 23 goals in 1912. After spending 1913 in England, Chamberlain returned for one final season in 1914 before again leaving the state, this time to Sydney.
