= Stuart King =

Australian rules footballer and cricketer

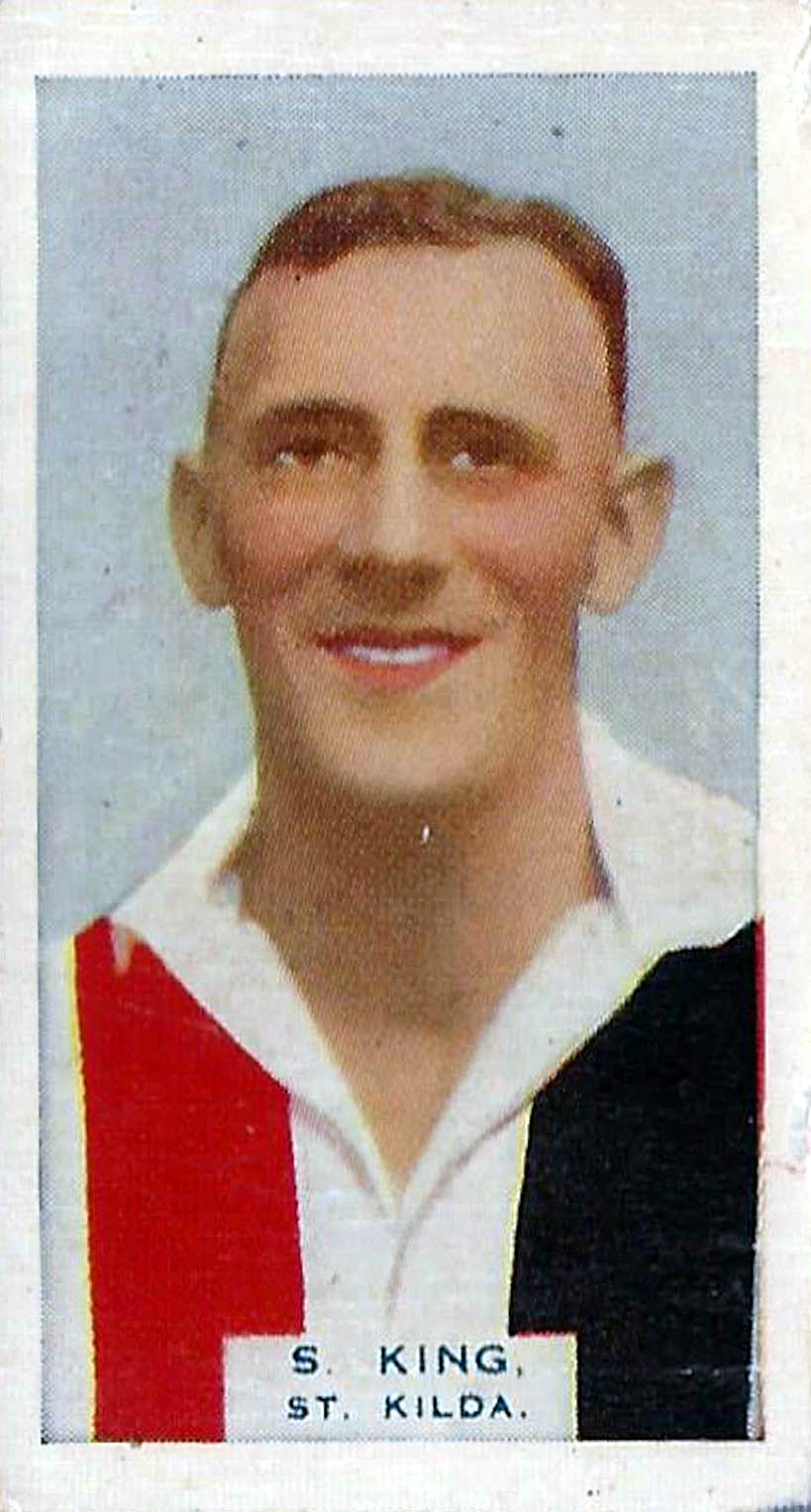
- Trading card 1933

Personal information
- Full name: Stuart Patrick King
- Born: 22 April 1906; Ararat, Victoria
- Died: 28 February 1943 (aged 36) at sea near the Frankland Islands, Queensland
- Original team: University Blacks
- Height: 184 cm (6 ft 0 in)
- Weight: 86 kg (190 lb)

Playing career^{1}
Years	Club	Games (Goals)
1931–1933	St Kilda	43 (14)

Coaching career
Years	Club	Games (W–L–D)
1932	St Kilda	11 (2–9–0)
- ^{1} Playing statistics correct to the end of 1933.

Stuart Patrick King (22 April 1906 – 28 February 1943) was an Australian sportsman who played first-class cricket for Victoria and Australian rules football for Victorian Football League club St Kilda.

== Family ==
The son of David James King (1873-), and Emily Mary King, née Matthews, later Mrs. Edwards, Stuart Patrick King was born in Ararat, Victoria on 22 April 1906.

He married Kathleen Patricia Lightfoot (1911-) at Newman College's chapel on 14 January 1935. They had two children: Gerald and Diana.

== Education ==
Educated at the University of Melbourne, he graduated Bachelor of Laws (LL.B.) in 1930, and was admitted to the bar on 1 May 1931.

== Cricket ==
Born in Ararat, Victoria, King started his cricket career first, debuting for Victoria in the 1926/27 Sheffield Shield season, on 17 December 1926, at the Melbourne Cricket Ground, against Queensland. He was a right-handed wicket-keeper batsman and batted in the middle order. The last of his 12 first-class matches was played in 1932/33 and he finished with 417 runs at 27.80. His claim to fame as a cricketer was scoring seven of Victoria's world record 1107 runs against New South Wales in his debut summer.

== Football ==
Having been recruited from the University Blacks, King played his first VFL match for St Kilda in 1931 and the following year was appointed club captain. When Charlie Hardy left the Saints seven games into the 1932 season he acted as a caretaker coach for the rest of the year. King played mostly as a defender and in his three seasons managed 43 games.

== Military service ==
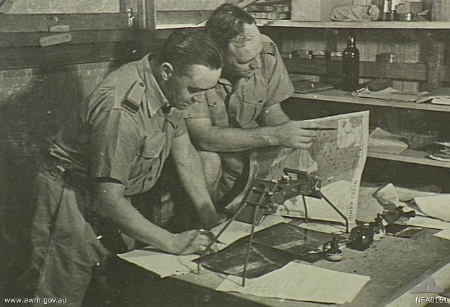
Stuart King (left) while serving in the RAAF in Cairns

Already a well-established barrister and solicitor, King enlisted in the Royal Australian Air Force on 30 March 1942 as an intelligence officer, and was posted to 20 Squadron, gaining the rank of Flying Officer.

== Death ==
He was killed as a result of an aircraft crash off the coast of Queensland on 28 February 1943. King wasn't a member of the crew — he went along as a 'supernumerary' person to observe the mission.

== See also ==
- List of Australian rules footballers and cricketers
- List of Victoria first-class cricketers
- List of Victorian Football League players who died on active service
