= 2024 in Australian rules football =

The following are the events of Australian rules football for the calendar year 2024, 166 years after the first game was played in 1858.

== Clubs ==
=== Mergers ===
Original clubs	New club	League	State	Date	Ref
Nullawil	Calder United Lions	North Central FL	VIC	20 June 2024	
Wycheproof-Narraport	Calder United Lions	North Central FL	VIC	20 June 2024	

== Deaths ==
=== January ===
- 14 January – John Bingley (83), St Kilda 1966 premiership player and Clarence 1970 premiership coach
- 21 January – Dick O'Bree (87), former Collingwood and Euroa player

=== February ===
- 5 February – Ernie O'Rourke (97), former Melbourne and North Melbourne player
- 19 February – Jesse Baird (26), AFL goal umpire

=== March ===
- 5 March – Steve Marsh (99), former South Fremantle and East Fremantle player
- 7 March – David Granger (69), former Port Adelaide and St Kilda player
- 24 March – Andrew Plympton (74), former St Kilda Football Club president
- 30 March – Les Twentyman (76), 1977 VFA Division 2 reserves premiership coach with Yarraville

=== April ===
- 16 April – Peter Davidson (60), former West Coast and Brisbane Bears player
- 25 April – Ross Thornton (67), former Fitzroy player

=== May ===
- 2 May – Ian Hayden (83), former University Blues and Richmond player
- 9 May – Cam McCarthy (29), former Greater Western Sydney and Fremantle player
- 13 May – Berkley Cox (90), Tasmanian Football Hall of Fame member
- 13 May – Reg Burgess (89), Essendon Hall of Fame member
- 23 May – Barry Davis (80), former Essendon and North Melbourne player

=== June ===
- 4 June – John Todd (86), 721-game WAFL coach and former South Fremantle player (death announced on this date)
- 5 June – Ross Booth (72), former VAFA player and VFA/VFL commentator (death announced on this date)
- 12 June – Nick Mustafa (26), Templestowe EFNL player
- 18 June – Billy Sullivan (20s), Melton BFNL player

=== July ===
- 4 July – Brian Lowe (85), former Geelong player and Tasmanian Football Hall of Fame member
- 13 July – Nick Campo (18), South Fremantle WAFL Colts player who died in car crash

=== August ===
- 3 August – Mark Slater (73), former Collingwood, Preston, Coburg and Bundoora player
- 20 August – Sam Landsberger (35), sports journalist and Herald Sun AFL writer

=== September ===
- 1 September – John Schultz (85), former Footscray player

=== November ===
- 21 November – Bianca Jones (19), Beaumaris VAFA player who died in suspected mass poisoning in Laos
- 22 November – Holly Bowles (19), Beaumaris VAFA player who died in suspected mass poisoning in Laos

=== December ===
- 30 December – Michael Turner (70), Geelong Hall of Fame player
