= Edward Pickett =

Edward Pickett may refer to:

- Ted Pickett (1909–2009), Australian sportsman
- Edward Bradford Pickett (1823–1882), attorney, Confederate soldier and Texas politician
