= Stuart Barclay =

Australian rules footballer

Personal information
- Full name: Stuart E. Barclay
- Born: 4 October 1949
- Died: 10 April 2025 (aged 75)
- Original team: Gisborne
- Height: 188 cm (6 ft 2 in)
- Weight: 79 kg (174 lb)

Playing career^{1}
Years	Club	Games (Goals)
1969–1973	Essendon	38 (3)
1974–1977	City-South	
1978–1981	Windsor-Zillmere	
- ^{1} Playing statistics correct to the end of 1981.

Career highlights
- Essendon reserves premiership 1968; City-South premiership 1974 (as captain-coach); Windsor-Zillmere premiership 1981

Stuart Barclay (4 October 1949 – 10 April 2025) was an Australian rules footballer who played with Essendon in the Victorian Football League (VFL).

Recruited from Gisborne, Barclay was a member of the 1968 Essendon reserves premiership team. A defender, Barclay was used initially as a back pocket but became a half-back. He played 38 league games for Essendon, from 1969 to 1973, then accepted an offer to captain-coach Launceston club City-South, which competed in the Northern Tasmanian Football Association.

Barclay was runner-up in the Hec Smith Medal and led City-South to a premiership in 1974, the first of his four seasons as coach. While in Tasmania, Barclay also coached the state team.

From 1978 to 1981, Barclay played in Queensland for Windsor-Zillmere and also represented Queensland. He retired after playing in Windsor-Zillmere's 1981 premiership, which they won with a grand final win over Kedron.

Stuart Barclay died in April 2025.
