= Graeme Wilkinson =

Australian rules footballer

Personal information
- Full name: Graeme Wilkinson
- Born: 31 March 1938 (age 88)
- Original team: Glenhuntly
- Height: 185 cm (6 ft 1 in)
- Weight: 86 kg (190 lb)
- Position: Forward/Ruckman

Playing career^{1}
Years	Club	Games (Goals)
1958	Melbourne	1 (0)
1960–61	Richmond	29 (32)
Total		30 (32)
- ^{1} Playing statistics correct to the end of 1961.

Graeme "Dreams" Wilkinson (born 31 March 1938) is a former Australian rules footballer who played for Melbourne and Richmond in the Victorian Football League (VFL).

As a forward or ruckman, Wilkinson spent two seasons at Richmond after failing to make his mark with Melbourne. His 21 goals in the 1960 VFL season was enough to top Richmond's goal-kicking.

The next phase of his career took place in the Northern Tasmanian Football Association (NTFA) where he played with City-South. He made a total of 204 NTFA appearances for City-South and was their 'best and fairest' winner in 1968. As captain-coach during the 1960s, Wilkinson steered his club to premierships in 1962 and 1966 as well as a win over Hobart in the 1966 Tasmanian State Grand Final at York Park. Wilkinson represented Tasmania at the 1966 Hobart Carnival, amongst his six interstate games.

After retiring, Wilkinson was a commentator on ABC radio for the NTFA and Statewide League. He has also served the NTFL as an administrator.

Inducted into the Tasmanian Football Hall of Fame in 2007, Wilkinson has also been honoured as the captain of the official City-South 'Team of the Century'.
