= Brian Lowe =

Australian rules footballer (1939–2024)

Personal information
- Born: 25 June 1939
- Died: 4 July 2024 (aged 85); Queensland, Australia
- Original team: City-South
- Height: 189 cm (6 ft 2 in)
- Weight: 83 kg (183 lb)
- Position: Ruckman

Playing career^{1}
Years	Club	Games (Goals)
1961–63	Geelong	36 (1)

Representative team honours
Years	Team	Games (Goals)
1964–68	Tasmania	8 (0)
- ^{1} Playing statistics correct to the end of 1963.

Career highlights
- 3× NTFA premiership player: 1959, 1960, 1967; 2× Tasmanian State Premiership player: 1960, 1964; 2× NWFU premiership player/coach: 1964, 1965; Tasmanian Football Hall of Fame: 2005

Brian Lowe (25 June 1939 – 4 July 2024) was an Australian rules footballer who played in Tasmania and Victoria from the late 1950s until the late 1970s.

He was inducted into the Tasmanian Football Hall of Fame in 2005.

== Playing career ==
Lowe started his career with Rossarden, before being recruited to Northern Tasmanian Football Association (NTFA) club City-South in 1957. In four seasons with the club, he would play in back-to-back premierships in 1959 and 1960, winning the club's best and fairest award in both seasons. City-South would also win their fifth Tasmanian State Premiership in 1960 with Lowe in the team.

A promising ruckman, Lowe was recruited by Geelong ahead of the 1961 VFL season. He played 36 matches with Geelong in the Victorian Football League (VFL) during the early 1960s while Bob Davis was coach and were starting to develop into a strong side. A member of Geelong's 1961 'night premiership' team, Lowe played in the drawn 1962 VFL Preliminary Final against Carlton as well as the narrow loss in the replay the following weekend. Geelong again made the finals again in 1963 but Lowe, despite participating in their semi-final defeat of Hawthorn Football Club which booked a place in the Grand Final, was not selected in the premiership decider, which they won. He would be instead be named best on ground in the club's 1963 VFL Reserves premiership victory against St Kilda.

== Coaching career ==
Upon leaving Geelong, Lowe returned to become player-coach of Tasmanian club Cooee in 1964, winning back-to-back North West Football Union premierships with the club in 1964 and 1965, also leading Cooee to their first Tasmanian State Premiership victory in 1964. While at Cooee, he would represent Tasmania as vice-captain in the 1966 Hobart Carnival.

He would later move to the East Launceston Football Club in 1967, winning another NTFA premiership that season. He would leave East Launceston at the end of the 1971 season, spending several seasons at Westbury, before announcing his retirement as player-coach while back at East Launceston in 1978.

After relocating to Queensland in 1979, he came out of retirement to lead Southport to the 1979 Gold Coast premiership, before permanently retiring from football at age 40.

== Death ==
Lowe died after a battle with Parkinson's disease on 4 July 2024, at the age of 85.

== Honours ==
His original club, City-South, placed him in the back pocket of their official 'Team of the Century'.

Lowe was inducted into the Tasmanian Football Hall of Fame in 2005.

== Sources ==
- Holmesby, Russell and Main, Jim (2007). The Encyclopedia of AFL Footballers. 7th ed. Melbourne: Bas Publishing.
