= East Launceston Football Club =

East Launceston

Names
- Full name: East Launceston Football Club
- Nickname(s): Demons
- Club song: "It's a Grand Old Flag!"

Club details
- Founded: 1948
- Dissolved: 26 May 1986; 39 years ago
- Colours
- Competition: TFL
- Ground(s): York Park (capacity: 21,000)

Uniforms
Home

The East Launceston Football Club was an Australian rules football club based in Launceston, Tasmania, Australia. Midway through the 1986 season, it amalgamated with its cross-town rival, City-South, to become the South Launceston Football Club.

== History ==
The club was founded in 1948 as "Cornwall Football Club" and participated with limited success during its 38-year tenure in the Northern Tasmanian Football Association (NTFA) competition. The club, nicknamed the Demons, changed its name to East Launceston in 1958 and was to play in two NTFA Grand Finals for a premiership win in 1967 and a 44-point loss to Launceston in the 1969 decider. Success was to elude the club again after this, and they made their last finals appearance during the 1985 NTFA finals series.

East Launceston continued to ply their trade in the NTFA until they were announced as a shock inclusion as one of two clubs from the NTFA (the other being northern powerhouse, North Launceston) to join the new TFL Statewide League competition in January 1986. After a dismal pre-season, the Demons, who were required to adopt an alternate playing uniform and colours owing to a clash with already established club North Hobart, began their new venture at TFL level with a shock win over Hobart at KGV Football Park on the opening day (playing in a Tasmanian state training uniform). However, after three thrashings in the first seven rounds, the Demons were to record their final win in their own right over North Launceston at York Park on 18 May. Still, after a 99-point home loss to Glenorchy the following week, the club announced on 26 May that they would be amalgamating with fellow Launceston-based club, City-South, to continue as the South Launceston Football Club.

== Summary ==
- Home Grounds – NTCA Ground (1948-1970) and York Park (1971-1986)
- Established – 1948 as Cornwall Football Club (changed to East Launceston in 1958)
- Playing Colours – Navy Blue and Red
- Emblem – Demons
- Club Theme Song – "It's a Grand Old Flag" (Tune: "You're a Grand Old Flag")
- Affiliations – NTFA (1948–1986), TFL Statewide League (1986)

== Premiership titles ==
NTFA Premierships

- 1967

TFL Statewide League Premierships

- Nil

Tasmanian State Premierships

- Nil

== Individual medal winners ==
Tasman Shields Trophy winners

- 1949 – Max Rees
- 1961 – Eddie Thomas
- 1962 – Darrell Pitcher

Hec. Smith Memorial Medal winners

- 1967 – Peter Webb
- 1969 – John Burns
- 1981 – Paul Reinmuth

== Competition Leading Goalkickers ==
NTFA Leading Goalkickers

- 1957 – Roy Ringrose (50)
- 1958 – Roy Ringrose (55)
- 1980 – Paul Wharton (59)

TFL Statewide League Leading Goalkickers

- Nil

== Club Records ==
Club Record Score

- 22.14 (146) v City-South at York Park in 1958.

Club Record Games Holder

- David Thomson (206)

== Club record match attendance ==
- 10,498 – East Launceston v North Launceston at York Park for the 1967 NTFA Grand Final.
