= Berkley Cox =

Australian rules footballer (1934–2024)

Personal information
- Full name: Berkley James Cox
- Born: 3 May 1934
- Died: 13 May 2024 (aged 90); Launceston, Tasmania
- Original team: City-South (NTFA)
- Height: 175 cm (5 ft 9 in)
- Weight: 76 kg (168 lb)
- Position: Centreman

Playing career^{1}
Years	Club	Games (Goals)
1958–65	Carlton	102 (45)
- ^{1} Playing statistics correct to the end of 1965.

Berkley James Cox (3 May 1934 – 13 May 2024) was an Australian rules footballer who played for Carlton in the Victorian Football League (VFL).

Cox was an established player at City-South in the Northern Tasmanian Football Association (NTFA) when he was lured to the mainland by Carlton. He appeared as a centreman in their 1962 VFL Grand Final loss to Essendon and kicked 17 goals the following season. Cox represented Tasmania at the 1966 Hobart Carnival.

Cox was inducted into the Tasmanian Football Hall of Fame in 2005. He died on 13 May 2024 at the age of 90.
