= Jamie Dennis =

Australian rules footballer

Jamie Dennis (2 April 1961 – 1 April 1995) was an Australian rules footballer who played in Tasmania during the 1980s and 1990s. He was inducted into the Tasmanian Football Hall of Fame in 2013.

Dennis played for Scottsdale from 1981 to 1987. He was a member of the club's Northern Tasmanian Football Association (NTFA) premiership teams in 1982, 1984 and 1986. He won the Hec Smith Medal (NTFA Best & Fairest award) in 1982 and 1984.

Between 1988 and 1992 Dennis played for North Launceston in the Tasmanian Statewide League competition. He was runner-up in the club Best & Fairest award in 1988 and 1990. He died from cancer in 1995.
