= Robert Nash (Australian footballer) =

Australian rules footballer

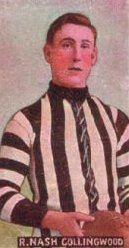

Personal information
- Full name: Robert Henry Nash
- Born: 22 April 1884; Carlton, Victoria
- Died: 16 June 1958 (aged 74); East Melbourne, Victoria
- Original team: Northcote
- Debut: Round 11, 1904, Collingwood vs. Fitzroy, at Victoria Park

Playing career^{1}
Years	Club	Games (Goals)
1904–1909	Collingwood (VFL)	88 (14)
1910–1912	Footscray (VFA)	34 (11)
- ^{1} Playing statistics correct to the end of 1912.

Career highlights
- Collingwood captain, 1908–1909; Represented Victoria, 1908

Robert Henry Nash (22 April 1884 – 16 June 1958) was a leading Australian rules footballer who was captain of the Collingwood Football Club in the Victorian Football League (VFL), and captain-coach of the Footscray Football Club in the Victorian Football Association (VFA).

== Family ==
The son of Michael Joseph "Mick" Nash (1862–1939), who played for Carlton when it was part of the VFA, and Mary Ann (a.k.a. "Marianne") Nash (1861–1940), née Tobin, Robert Henry Nash was born on 22 April 1884. He married Mary Anne Ryan in 1906.

His uncle, Thomas M. Nash (1859–?), also played for Carlton when it was part of the VFA. Bob Nash is best known as the father of Test cricketer and leading footballer Laurie Nash.

== Football ==
=== Northcote (MJFA) ===
Nash played for Northcote in the Metropolitan Junior Football Association (MJFA) until he was recruited by Collingwood in 1904.

=== Collingwood (VFL) ===
Nash became a leading player at Collingwood, playing 88 games and kicking 14 goals in six seasons Regarded as a powerful player who was a good mark and kick, he captained Collingwood in 1908 and 1909 and represented Victoria at the first interstate carnival in Melbourne in 1908.

In August 1907, due to an incident during the 17 August 1907 match that Collingwood lost 3.8 (26) to St. Kilda 8.19 (67), "Nash, of Collingwood, was disqualified for [three matches for] assaulting [Jack] Wells, of St. Kilda, though the latter was the aggressor in connection with that particular incident, previously to which Nash had been guilty of a grossly savage attack on [Jimmy] Matthews — a diminutive St. Kilda player — for which he was not called to account at all."

In June 1909, following the drawn 19 June match between Collingwood and Melbourne, Nash was reported for disputing the umpire's decision; and, although found guilty at the hearing, Nash was not suspended, but was "admonished" by the VFL's tribunal.

=== Footscray (VFA) ===
He left Collingwood at the end of the 1909 VFL season, serving two years as captain-coach of VFA side Footscray (1910–1911), and one additional year as a player (1912), before retiring at the end of 1912.

== Tasmania ==
Initially employed as a gas stoker, Nash became a policeman and, as such, participated in the 1923 Victorian police strike.

Discharged from the force along with 633 others as a result of his participation in that strike, he moved his family to Tasmania, and took over the hotel at Parattah. There he oversaw the sporting development of Laurie and his other son, Robert Jnr (also an accomplished footballer, who played for four seasons with the Coburg Football Club in the VFA, from 1934 to 1937); and, initially, he encouraged Laurie to concentrate on cricket rather than football, refusing to allow Laurie to play senior football before he turned 19.

== Death ==
Nash collapsed and died at the Melbourne Cricket Ground, on Monday 16 June 1958, just before three-quarter-time, while watching a Melbourne-Collingwood match on the Queen's Birthday.

== See also ==
- 1908 Melbourne Carnival
