= South Launceston Football Club =

Names
- Full name: South Launceston Football Club
- Former name(s): East Launceston, City South.
- Nickname: Bulldogs
- Club song: "It's A Grand Old Flag" (Same as Melbourne Football Club but with slightly modified lyrics _ "the team of the red, white and blue")

2018 (NTFA) season
- After finals: 1st
- Home-and-away season: 1st
- Leading goalkicker: Brad Keegan
- Best and fairest: Leigh Harding

Club details
- Founded: 29 May 1986; 40 years ago (as a merger)
- Colours
- Competition: Northern Tasmanian Football Association
- President: Wayne Mitchell
- Coach: Aaron Viney
- Captain: Luke McCarty
- Ground: Youngtown Oval (capacity: 2,000)

Uniforms
Home

Other information
- Official website: southlaunceston.com

The South Launceston Football Club is an Australian rules football club currently competing in the Northern Tasmanian Football Association. They were formed through a merger between City-South and East Launceston in 1986, clubs in the former Northern Tasmanian Football Association (which is not related to the current NTFA). South Launceston was in the TFL Statewide League from 1986 to 1997, then the Northern Tasmanian Football League until 2008, then in the Tasmanian Football League until 2013.

The club is nicknamed The Bulldogs, a name which was adopted upon the merger. City-South were the Redlegs and East Launceston had been known as the Demons. For their club colours they took City-South's red and white as well as the blue from East Launceston's guernsey to give them their current royal blue, red and white club colours.

== Club history ==
=== The Statewide League Era ===
South Launceston's first taste of statewide football could be described as a failure. In 12 seasons in the Statewide Competition the Bulldogs never contested the finals with a highest finish of 6th in 1992. During these 12 years South Launceston managed to collect 3 wooden spoons, this feat has only been matched by New Norfolk who have spent a longer period in the statewide league.

=== Northern Tasmanian Football League ===
In 1998 South Launceston pre-empted the collapse of the statewide league in 2000 when they decided to join the NTFL. This move greeted them with success with them winning the 1998 and 1999 NTFL Premierships. South Launceston remained competitive while they were in this competition.

=== Tasmanian State League ===
In 2008 the South Launceston Football Club accepted an invitation to leave the Northern Tasmanian Football League (NTFL) and join the new Tasmanian Football League in 2009. After three seasons of very poor on-field performance, which included two wooden spoons and a win–loss record of 8–46 across the three years, the club appointed Mitch Thorp as playing coach for 2012. Under Thorp, the club rose to the minor premiership in 2013, with a record of 17–3, and went on to defeat Burnie in the Grand Final to win its first statewide premiership.

However, while its premiership season was ongoing, on 3 July 2013, a meeting of club members determined in a split vote to not pursue a further license in the Tasmanian State League beyond the season. The club rejected an opportunity to have a joint venture with the Prospect Senior Football Club for a 10-year license in the TSL.

The Prospect Senior Football Club and the Prospect Junior Football Club subsequently took up a 100% share of the TSL license and formed the Prospect State Football Club t/a Western Storm.

=== Northern Tasmanian Football Association ===
In late 2013 the South Launceston Football Club was successful in being accepted into the Northern Tasmanian Football Association (NTFA) and will play the first division against pre-merger rivals Longford and Scottsdale as well as previously amateur and country teams that make up the competition. The South Launceston team that first contested the NTFA in 2014 was successful in winning the senior premiership with a victory over Deloraine in the Grand Final.

== Honours ==
=== Club ===
- Tasmanian Football League (1): 2013
- Tasmanian State Premierships (7): 1928, 1930, 1932, 1954, 1960, 1966, 1972
- Northern Tasmanian Football Association (28): 1886, 1887, 1890, 1891, 1895, 1902, 1903, 1907, 1908,1910, 1914, 1921, 1922, 1928, 1930, 1932, 1939, 1941, 1952, 1953, 1954,1956, 1959, 1960, 1962, 1966, 1972, 1974

=== Individual ===
Tasman Shields Trophy winners

- Harry Wade 1925
- Laurie Nash 1931, 1932
- Jock Connell 1934, 1939
- Ted Pickett 1935
- Max Pontifex 1938
- Harry Styles 1948
- Laurie Moir 1952

Hec Smith Memorial Medalists

- Stuart Palmer 1971
- Derek Peardon 1973
- Rod Thomas 1983

All Australians

- Geoff Long – 1956

NTFA Leading Goalkickers

- R.Ellis (10)- 1886
- J.Riva (6) – 1887
- C.Allison (6) – 1890
- A.Norman (12) – 1894
- A.Norman (8) – 1895
- F.Angus (16) – 1896
- A.Norman (10) – 1902
- L.Firth (12) – 1904
- Scott (12) & Waller (12) – 1906
- L.Firth (12) – 1907
- Ward (13) – 1908
- Bob Nash jnr (71) – 1932
- J.Martin (78) – 1946
- Murray Bramich (61) – 1959
- Stan Morcom (97) – 1960
- Graeme Wilkinson (54) – 1968
- Craig McIntyre (74) – 1985

=== East Launceston ===
NTFA Premierships (1)

- 1967

Tasman Shields Trophy winners

- Eddie Thomas 1961
- Darrell Pitcher 1962

Hec Smith Memorial Medalists

- Peter Webb 1967
- John Burns 1969
- Paul Reinmuth 1981

NTFA Leading Goalkickers

- Roy Ringrose (50) – 1957
- Roy Ringrose (55) – 1958
- Paul Wharton (59) – 1980

=== South Launceston ===
Northern Tasmanian Football League Premierships (2)

- 1998, 1999

Darrel Baldock Medalists

- Scott Harris – 2000
- Matthew Westfield – 2006

Tasmanian State League Premierships (1)

- 2013

Tassie Medalists

- Mitch Thorp - 2013

Northern Tasmanian Football Association Premierships (2)

- 2014, 2015

== Records ==
Highest score - Regional Football

- City/City-South – 38.15 (243) vs East Launceston in 1974
- Cornwall/East Launceston 22.14 (146) vs City-South in 1958
- South Launceston – 34.19 (223) vs Penguin in 1998

Highest score - State Football

- South Launceston – 29.16 (190) vs Devonport in 2013

Most games

- City/City-South – 224 by Geoff Long
- Cornwall/East Launceston – 206 by David Thomson
- South Launceston – 199 by Nathan Richardson

== Team of the Century ==
An official 'Team of the Century' for City-South was announced in 2002, which took into account the period from 1886 until 1986, when they merged with East Launceston

City-South 'Team of the Century'
B:	Rusty Wainwright	Verdun Howell	Brian Lowe
HB:	John Bingley	Laurie Nash	Harry Styles
C:	Laurie Moir	Berkley Cox	Kim Saltmarsh
HF:	Roy Cazaly	Geoff Long	Craig Coombes
F:	Graeme Wilkinson (c)	Stan Morcom	Bill Linger
Foll:	Jock Connell (vc)	Derek Peardon	Paul Luttrell
Int:	Jim Wynwood	Mike Delanty	Bill Spearman
Int:	Stuart Barclay		
Coach:	Bob Miller		
