= Derek Peardon =

Australian rules footballer

Personal information
- Born: 24 September 1950 (age 76)
- Original team: Kings Meadows High School (Tas)
- Height: 183 cm (6 ft 0 in)
- Weight: 86 kg (190 lb)

Playing career^{1}
Years	Club	Games (Goals)
1968–1971	Richmond	20 (1)
- ^{1} Playing statistics correct to the end of 1971.

Career highlights
- Richmond Under 19s Premiership Player 1967; Richmond Reserves Premiership Player 1971

Derek Peardon (born 24 September 1950) is a former Australian rules football player who played in the VFL between 1968 and 1971 for the Richmond Football Club.

At the age of five Peardon and his sister Annette were taken from their family on Cape Barren Island and placed in orphanages in Launceston. A champion schoolboy footballer and gifted professional runner, Peardon was the second Aboriginal Tasmanian to play in the VFL, and the first for Richmond.

Selected in the 1965 All-Australian Schoolboys' team, he played in the 1966 Richmond Fourths premiership side as well as the 1967 Under 19s premiership and 1971 Reserves premiership, his last game for the club.

Returning to Tasmania in 1972, Peardon played six seasons for City South, including premierships in 1972 and 1974. During this period he won two club best and fairest awards as well as the Northern Tasmanian Football Association best and fairest in 1973. He represented the NTFA on nine occasions and Tasmania twice. He also played one season, 1977, for North Hobart in the Tasmanian Football League.

During his time at Richmond one of his teammates was Kevin Sheedy. Sheedy credits Peardon with initiating his interest in indigenous Australia.
