= John Burns (Australian rules footballer) =

Australian rules footballer

Personal information
- Born: 10 August 1949 (age 77)
- Original team: East Launceston (NTFA)
- Height: 178 cm (5 ft 10 in)
- Weight: 85 kg (187 lb)

Playing career^{1}
Years	Club	Games (Goals)
1970–1973	East Perth	71 (31)
1973–1978	North Melbourne	95 (68)
1979	Geelong	17 (10)
Total		183 (118)
- ^{1} Playing statistics correct to the end of 1979.

John Burns (born 10 August 1949) is a former Australian rules footballer who played for North Melbourne and Geelong in the Victorian Football League (VFL) during the 1970s.

Prior to joining North Melbourne, Burns played with East Launceston in the Northern Tasmanian Football Association with whom he won both the competition and club best and fairest in 1969. That year he also represented the Tasmanian interstate team at the Adelaide Carnival. From 1970 he spent four seasons with East Perth and played in their 1972 premiership side. While in Western Australia he represented the state in two interstate matches.

A centreman, Burns crossed to North Melbourne in 1973 and went on to play in three successive Grand Finals, culminating in a premiership in 1975. He performed well in the 1975 Grand Final, kicking four goals. In both 1975 and 1976 he polled well in the Brownlow Medal, finishing as North Melbourne's second biggest vote getter each year. He finished his career with a brief stint at Geelong.
