= Mark Slater (Australian footballer) =

Australian rules footballer and coach (1951–2024)

Personal information
- Full name: Mark Jonathan Slater
- Born: 11 July 1951
- Died: 3 August 2024 (aged 73)
- Height: 180 cm (5 ft 11 in)
- Weight: 71 kg (157 lb)

Playing career^{1}
Years	Club	Games (Goals)
1969–1970	Collingwood	2 (0)
- ^{1} Playing statistics correct to the end of 1970.

Mark Jonathan Slater (11 July 1951 – 3 August 2024) was an Australian rules footballer who played with Collingwood in the Victorian Football League (VFL).

Aged just 17, Slater made his VFL debut in Collingwood's round 10 win over Geelong at Victoria Park in the 1969 season. His second and final appearance for Collingwood came in the opening round of the 1970 VFL season, against Footscray at Western Oval.

After leaving Collingwood, Slater joined Preston in the Victorian Football Association (VFA) for the 1971 season, playing at least 17 games and kicking 21 goals. He moved to Coburg in 1974, playing in the club's Division 2 premiership that year before leaving at the end of the 1976 season.

Slater captain-coached Bundoora to the 1981 Diamond Valley Football League Division 2 premiership. He won the Division 2's best and fairest award that year.

Slater died on 3 August 2024, at the age of 73.
