= Paul Reinmuth =

Australian rules footballer (1954–2018)

Personal information
- Full name: Paul Anthony Reinmuth
- Born: 27 March 1954
- Died: 6 December 2018 (aged 64)
- Original team: Hawthorn District
- Height: 184 cm (6 ft 0 in)
- Weight: 89 kg (196 lb)

Playing career^{1}
| Years | Club | Games (Goals) |
| 1974 | Hawthorn | 1 (0) |
- ^{1} Playing statistics correct to the end of 1974.

Paul Anthony Reinmuth (27 March 1954 – 6 December 2018) was an Australian rules footballer who played for Hawthorn in the Victorian Football League (VFL).

Paul Reinmuth played his early football at Hawthorn District. He made just one appearance for Hawthorn in the VFL, a 47-point win over St Kilda at Princes Park in round nine of the 1974 season. The next stage of his career took place in the Northern Tasmanian Football Association and he won the Hec Smith Memorial Medal in 1981 while playing at East Launceston.

Son Tom Reinmuth. Tom a backline player that played in the last South Launceston Football club TSL premiership 2013.
