= Bundoora Football Club =

Names
- Full name: Bundoora Football Club
- Nickname(s): The Bulls

2017 season
- After finals: Premiers
- Leading goalkicker: Gary Moorcroft (56)
- Best and fairest: Matthew Dennis

Club details
- Founded: 1974
- Colours: Navy and White
- Competition: Northern Football League
- President: Bill Price
- Coach: Ricky Dyson
- Captain(s): Brent Marshall
- Ground(s): Yulong Reserve

Other information

Bundoora Football Club is an Australian rules football club in Bundoora, Victoria, currently competing in the Northern Football League. They are affiliated with the Bundoora Junior Football Club, who play in the Yarra Junior Football League.

As of 2024, Heath Scotland is its senior coach.

== History ==
- 1975–1980 P.H.F.L A Grade Premiers 1980
- 1981–1981 D.V.F.L Division Two, Premiers 1981
- 1982–2006 D.V.F.L Division One, Premiers 1995, 1996
- 2007–2017 N.F.L Division One, Premiers 2011, 2013, 2017
- 2018- present N.F.N.L Division One, Reserves Premiers 2018, 2019

== VFL/AFL players ==
- Mark Slater (Collingwood)
- Cameron Cloke (Collingwood, Carlton & Port Adelaide)
- Gary Moorcroft (Essendon & Melbourne)
- Ricky Dyson, (Essendon)

Brad Boyd (Fitzroy & Brisbane Lions)

Paul Walker (Collingwood )

== League Best & Fairest Winners ==
Year	Player
2017	Matthew Dennis
2016	Matthew Dennis
2013	Cameron Cloke
2012	Matthew Dennis (tie)
2008	David Mitchell (tie)
2000	Paul King
1995	Adrian Cameron
1993	Kevin Brown
1992	Chris Keating
1990	Chris Keating
1981	Mark Slater

== League Leading Goalkickers ==
- 2016 Gary Moorcroft 73 NFL
- 2014 Gary Moorcroft 68 NFL
- 2013 Cameron Cloke 93 NFL
- 2012 Gary Moorcroft 75 NFL
- 1980 Ron Huy 129 P.H.F.L.
