= Ted Pickett =

Australian athlete

Personal information
- Full name: Edward Arthur Pickett
- Born: 2 April 1909; Ulverstone, Tasmania, Australia
- Died: 29 January 2009 (aged 99); Launceston, Tasmania, Australia
- Batting: Left-handed
- Role: Wicket-keeper

Domestic team information
- Years: Team
- Tasmania
- First-class debut: 19 February 1929 Tasmania v Victoria
- Last First-class: 2 January 1936 Tasmania v Victoria

Career statistics
Competition	First-class
Matches	11
Runs scored	86
Batting average	7.16
100s/50s	0/0
Top score	16*
Balls bowled	0
Wickets	-
Bowling average	-
5 wickets in innings	-
10 wickets in match	-
Best bowling	-
Catches/stumpings	7/5
- Source: CricketArchive, 13 February 2009

Edward Arthur Pickett, OAM (2 April 1909 – 29 January 2009) was a leading Australian sportsman of the twentieth century, playing representative cricket, Australian rules football, tennis, badminton, golf, billiards, snooker and athletics. He has been called "probably the greatest all-round sportsman Tasmania has produced".

Born in Ulverstone, Tasmania, Pickett was a leading sportsman while still at school, winning tennis's Pardey Shield, the most prestigious trophy in Tasmanian junior tennis, in 1926, and representing Northern Tasmania in tennis.

== Cricket ==
A wicket-keeper, Pickett began playing for Tamar Cricket Club in the Northern Tasmania Cricket Association alongside Laurie Nash. His skill behind the stumps led Pickett to his first-class debut for Tasmania aged nineteen on 19 February 1929 against Victoria at the Melbourne Cricket Ground, scoring three runs and claiming two dismissals.

Pickett became Tasmania's first choice wicketkeeper but due to Tasmania not being a part of the Sheffield Shield, his first-class opportunities were limited and in six years played only eleven matches for Tasmania, scoring 86 runs at 7.16 and taking seven catches and five stumpings. However, Pickett is considered one of the best wicketkeepers to play for Tasmania with his stumping ability particularly impressive.

In a match against the 1930 Australian side en route to England, Pickett, who worked on the front counter of the Launceston Examiner newspaper, sought time off to play. Pickett's boss agreed on the condition that the paper got a photo of Don Bradman batting while Pickett was keeping. Unfortunately for Pickett, Nash got Bradman out lbw for 22 before the Examiner's photographer arrived.

At lunch, Pickett approached Bradman and asked for a photograph. Bradman agreed to help out as long as he did not have to put his pads back on. Bradman and Pickett strode out to the middle, Bradman took strike and Pickett crouched behind the stumps and a picture was taken, leaving Pickett to spend the next few weeks explaining to everyone that Bradman had not started a trend for batting without pads.

== Australian rules football ==
Pickett was also a leading Australian rules footballer, playing for Launceston and Longford in the Northern Tasmania Football Association. He won the Tasman Shields Trophy for the NTFA best and fairest in 1935. He also played for Northern Tasmania a number of times against visiting interstate sides.

Following his retirement from football, Pickett became a bookmaker in Launceston in 1938 and held a licence for 37 years.

== World War II ==
Pickett enlisted in the Australian Army on 16 December 1942, gaining the rank Private and was posted to the 12/50 Australian Infantry Battalion. Pickett served with the 12/50 in Darwin and surrounding areas. He was discharged on 16 November 1943.

== Billiards and Snooker ==
Pickett played in the Australian billiards championship four times and in 1955 was the first player to win the Tasmanian billiards and snooker titles in the one year. He played in three Australian snooker championships, and won the national title in 1955, becoming the first Tasmanian to do so. He had backed £100 on himself to win, ensuring his celebration expenses were adequately covered.

Pickett was Walter Lindrum's opponent in a series of charity exhibition matches held around Tasmania.

== Other sports ==
Pickett also represented Northern Tasmania in badminton and was one of the state's leading golfers. Additionally, as an athlete, he won numerous quarter-mile events at carnivals around Tasmania, including winning the 1928 Smithton and Latrobe quarter miles and finishing second in the Latrobe Gift.

That Pickett did not concentrate on one sport is considered to have cost him national representation.

== Honours and legacy ==
The Ted Pickett Shield, awarded to the winner of the Tasmanian snooker championships, is named in his honour.

Pickett was inducted into the Tasmanian Sporting Hall of Fame in 1994 and awarded a Medal of the Order of Australia on 11 June 2007 "for service to a range of sports as a player and coach at state and national levels, and through support for young sports people".

Ted Pickett's age of 99 years and 302 days places him third among the longest-lived of Australian first-class players and his living 79 years and 345 days after his first-class debut is a record in Australian cricket.

== See also ==
- List of Tasmanian representative cricketers
