= Northern Tasmanian Football Association (1886–1986) =

Original NTFA

The Northern Tasmanian Football Association (NTFA) was an Australian rules football competition which ran from 1886 to 1986. In its time it was one of the three main leagues in Tasmania, with the Tasmanian Football League and North West Football Union representing the rest of the state. It was based in the city of Launceston. The three most successful clubs of the old NTFA, Launceston, North Launceston and City-South, went on to compete in the short-lived TFL Statewide League.

From 1947 to 1983 the NTFA was a six team competition, in 1984 George Town and Deloraine joined to make eight teams.

In 1987, the NTFA merged with the North West Football Union to form the Northern Tasmanian Football League.

At the end of 1995 the Tasmanian Amateur Football Association disbanded, The southern clubs help form the Southern Football League, The northern clubs formed a competition called the Northern Tasmanian Football Association. There is no relationship between the old and new NTFA.

== Clubs ==
=== Final ===
Club	Colours	Nickname	Home Ground	Former League	Est.	Years in NTFA	NTFA Senior Premierships		Fate
Club	Colours	Nickname	Home Ground	Former League	Est.	Years in NTFA	Total	Years	Fate
City-South (City 1886-1956)		Redlegs	York Park, Invermay	–	1879	1886-1986	28	1886, 1887, 1890, 1891, 1895, 1902, 1903, 1907, 1908, 1910, 1914, 1921, 1922, 1928, 1930, 1932, 1939, 1941, 1952, 1953, 1954, 1956, 1959, 1960, 1962, 1966, 1972, 1974	Merged with East Launceston to form South Launceston in TFL in May 1986
Deloraine	(1946-51)(1984-86)	Kangaroos	Deloraine Recreation Ground, Deloraine	EFA	1894	1946-1951, 1984-1986	0	-	Formed Northern Tasmanian District FL in 1952. Formed Northern Tasmanian FL in 1987
George Town		Saints	George Town Sports Complex, George Town	TFA	1927	1984-1986	0	-	Formed Northern Tasmanian FL in 1987
Launceston		Blues	Windsor Park, Riverside	–	1875	1886-1986	26	1888, 1889, 1892, 1893, 1894, 1897, 1899, 1900, 1909, 1913, 1920, 1924, 1926, 1929, 1933, 1934, 1935, 1936, 1937, 1938, 1940, 1945, 1951, 1969, 1976, 1985	Formed Northern Tasmanian FL in 1987
Longford	(1926-?)(1950s)(?-1986)	Tigers	Longford Recreation Ground, Longford	CFA	1878	1926-1986	3	1955, 1957, 1958	Formed Northern Tasmanian FL in 1987
Scottsdale		Magpies	Scottsdale Recreation Ground, Scottsdale	NEFU	1889	1949-1986	10	1964, 1965, 1968, 1970, 1971, 1973, 1977, 1982, 1984, 1986	Formed Northern Tasmanian FL in 1987

=== Former ===
Club	Colours	Nickname	Home Ground	Former League	Est.	Years in NTFA	NTFA Senior Premierships		Fate
Club	Colours	Nickname	Home Ground	Former League	Est.	Years in NTFA	Total	Years	Fate
East Launceston (Cornwall 1948-57)		Demons	York Park, Invermay	–	1948	1948-1985	1	1967	Moved to TFL in 1986
Fitzroy				–	1895	1895-?	1	1896	Folded
North Launceston (Railway 1896-97, Essendon 1898)		Robins	York Park, Invermay	NTJFA	1893	1896-1985	24	1898, 1901, 1904, 1905, 1906, 1911, 1912, 1923, 1925, 1927, 1931, 1946, 1947, 1948, 1949, 1950, 1961, 1963, 1975, 1978, 1979, 1980, 1981, 1983	Moved to TFL in 1986
Westbury		Tigers	Westbury Recreation Ground, Westbury	CFA	1902	1946-1951	0	-	Played in seconds competition. Formed Northern Tasmanian District FL in 1952.

== NTFA premierships ==
=== Winners by year ===
Year	Premiers	Def.	Runner-up	Year	Premiers	Def.	Runner-up
1886	City			1937	Launceston 11.11 (77)	def.	North Launceston 10.10 (70)
1887	City			1938	Launceston 12.14 (86)	def.	City 8.13 (61)
1888	Launceston			1939	City 13.9 (87)	def.	North Launceston 8.11 (59)
1889	Launceston			1940	Launceston 12.17 (89)	def.	Longford 6.9 (45)
1890	City			1941	City 16.23 (119)	def.	North Launceston 7.12 (54)
1891	City			1942–44	(World War Two)		
1892	Launceston			1945	Launceston 8.13 (61)	def.	North Launceston 8.7 (55)
1893	Launceston			1946	North Launceston 11.11 (77)	def.	City 8.11 (59)
1894	Launceston			1947	North Launceston 18.14 (122)	def.	City 5.13 (43)
1895	City			1948	North Launceston 12.14 (86)	def.	Launceston 13.4 (82)
1896	Fitzroy			1949	North Launceston 10.15 (75)	def.	Launceston 9.14 (68)
1897	Launceston			1950	North Launceston 13.11 (89)	def.	City 8.11 (59)
1898	Essendon			1951	Launceston 10.15 (75)	def.	City 9.9 (63)
1899	Launceston			1952	City 12.11 (83)	def.	Scottsdale 9.9 (63)
1900	Launceston			1953	City 10.12 (72)	def.	Longford 9.12 (66)
1901	North Launceston		(No Final Played)	1954	City 12.13 (85)	def.	Launceston 7.13 (55)
1902	City		(No Final Played)	1955	Longford 13.7 (85)	def.	City 10.13 (73)
1903	City		(No Final Played)	1956	City 10.6 (66)	def.	North Launceston 9.4 (58)
1904	North Launceston		(No Final Played)	1957	Longford 11.11 (77)	def.	Launceston 6.7 (43)
1905	North Launceston 7.6 (48)	def.	Launceston 6.9 (45)	1958	Longford 14.12 (96)	def.	North Launceston 12.18 (90)
1906	North Launceston		(No Final Played)	1959	City-South 13.10 (88)	def.	Longford 9.13 (67)
1907	City		(No Final Played)	1960	City-South 11.19 (85)	def.	North Launceston 12.8 (80)
1908	City		(No Final Played)	1961	North Launceston 8.11 (59)	def.	Longford 8.10 (58)
1909	Launceston		(No Final Played)	1962	City-South 11.10 (76)	def.	Longford 8.13 (61)
1910	City 7.19 (61)	def.	North Launceston 7.7 (49)	1963	North Launceston 7.17 (59)	def.	Longford 8.9 (57)
1911	North Launceston 6.13 (49)	def.	City 3.5 (23)	1964	Scottsdale 8.15 (63)	def.	City-South 6.7 (43)
1912	North Launceston		(No Final Played)	1965	Scottsdale 19.21 (135)	def.	North Launceston 11.13 (79)
1913	Launceston		(No Final Played)	1966	City-South 9.13 (67)	def.	Scottsdale 7.7 (49)
1914	City		(No Final Played)	1967	East Launceston 9.12 (66)	def.	North Launceston 8.16 (64)
1915–18	(World War One)			1968	Scottsdale 8.18 (66)	def.	Launceston 8.12 (60)
1919	(Influenza epidemic)			1969	Launceston 23.11 (149)	def.	East Launceston 16.9 (105)
1920	Launceston		(No Final Played)	1970	Scottsdale 18.16 (124)	def.	Launceston 14.15 (99)
1921	City 8.10 (58)	def.	North Launceston 7.4 (46)	1971	Scottsdale 21.10 (136)	def.	City-South 5.13 (43)
1922	City		(No Final Played)	1972	City-South 11.7 (73)	def.	Launceston 2.15 (27)
1923	North Launceston		(No Final Played)	1973	Scottsdale 11.12 (78)	def.	North Launceston 10.7 (67)
1924	Launceston 6.13 (49)	def.	City 3.3 (21)	1974	City-South 5.13 (43)	def.	Scottsdale 2.10 (22)
1925	North Launceston 8.8 (56)	def.	Launceston 6.11 (47)	1975	North Launceston 16.14 (110)	def.	Scottsdale 8.10 (58)
1926	Launceston 7.18 (60)	def.	City 6.11 (47)	1976	Launceston 13.10 (88)	def.	North Launceston 12.15 (87)
1927	North Launceston 9.8 (62)	def.	Launceston 6.10 (46)	1977	Scottsdale 15.19 (109)	def.	North Launceston 10.10 (70)
1928	City 8.6 (54)	def.	North Launceston 5.8 (38)	1978	North Launceston 14.12 (96)	def.	Launceston 11.17 (83)
1929	Launceston 9.8 (62)	def.	North Launceston 6.10 (46)	1979	North Launceston 15.7 (97)	def.	Scottsdale 13.17 (95)
1930	City 15.19 (109)	def.	Launceston 8.10 (58)	1980	North Launceston 15.13 (103)	def.	City-South 11.13 (79)
1931	North Launceston 10.13 (73)	def.	Longford 6.7 (43)	1981	North Launceston 14.21 (105)	def.	Launceston 12.8 (80)
1932	City 6.15 (51)	def.	North Launceston 5.18 (48)	1982	Scottsdale 19.9 (123)	def.	Launceston 12.10 (82)
1933	Launceston 13.14 (92)	def.	City 7.8 (50)	1983	North Launceston 14.14 (98)	def.	Longford 10.10 (70)
1934	Launceston 14.22 (106)	def.	North Launceston 6.15 (51)	1984	Scottsdale 13.11 (89)	def.	Launceston 13.7 (85)
1935	Launceston 14.9 (93)	def.	North Launceston 12.12 (84)	1985	Launceston 19.22 (136)	def.	North Launceston 12.11 (83)
1936	Launceston 15.21 (111)	def.	North Launceston 10.15 (75)	1986	Scottsdale 20.14 (134)	def.	Longford 17.11 (113)

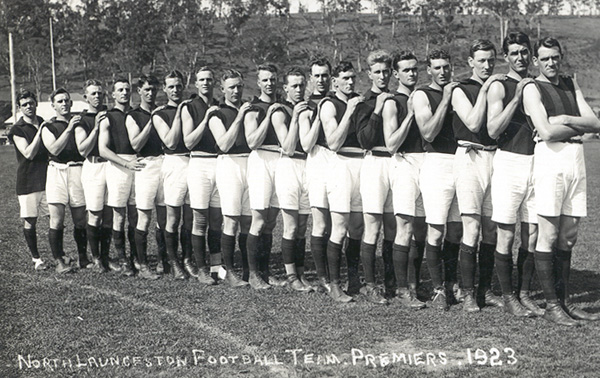
The North Launceston Football Club in 1923

=== Most wins ===
Club	Premierships
City-South	28
Launceston	26
North Launceston	24
Scottsdale	10
Longford	3
East Launceston	1
Fitzroy (NTFA)	1

== Tasmanian State Premiership ==
This was contested semi regularly between the premiers of the Tasmanian Football League, North West Football Union and the NTFA.

The winners from the NTFA were –

- 1905 – North Launceston (unofficial)
- 1906 – North Launceston (unofficial)
- 1928 – City
- 1930 – City
- 1932 – City
- 1933 – Launceston
- 1934 – Launceston
- 1935 – Launceston
- 1937 – Launceston
- 1938 – Launceston
- 1947 – North Launceston
- 1949 – North Launceston
- 1950 – North Launceston
- 1954 – City
- 1957 – Longford
- 1960 – City-South
- 1966 – City-South
- 1972 – City-South
- 1973 – Scottsdale

== Best and Fairests ==
Hardesty Cup

- 1924 – L. J. Keogh

Tasman Shields Trophy

- 1925 – Harold Wade
- 1926 – Len Gaffney
- 1927 – Len Gaffney, Fred Odgers
- 1928 – Neil Edwards
- 1929 – Jim Milbourne
- 1930 – Leo Wescott
- 1931 – Laurie Nash
- 1932 – Laurie Nash
- 1933 – Bill Cahill
- 1934 – Jock Connell
- 1935 – Ted Pickett (Longford)
- 1936 – Bill Cahill
- 1937 – Fred Smith
- 1938 – Max Pontifex, Fred Smith
- 1939 – Jock Connell, Tom Ryan
- 1940 – Lloyd Bennett
- 1941 – Frank Horsenail
- 1945 – Frank Horsenail
- 1946 – Lance Crosswell
- 1947 – Lance Crosswell
- 1948 – Terry Cashion, Harry Styles
- 1949 – Max Rees
- 1950 – Terry Cashion
- 1951 – Terry Cashion, Darrell Crosswell
- 1952 – Bill Byrne, Charlie Dennis, Laurie Moir
- 1953 – Laurie McGee
- 1954 – Charlie Dennis, Laurie McGee
- 1955 – Charlie Dennis
- 1956 – Jim Ross
- 1957 – John Fitzallen
- 1958 – Jim Ross
- 1959 – Bob Bye
- 1960 – Bob Bye
- 1961 – Eddie Thomas
- 1962 – Darrell Pitcher (East Launceston)
- 1963 – Kevin McLean (North Launceston)
- 1964 – Charlie Thompson (North Launceston)
- 1965 – Nigel Wilson (Longford)

Hec Smith Memorial Medal

- 1966 – Barry Lawrence (Longford)
- 1967 – Peter Webb (East Launceston)
- 1968 – Alby Dunn (Launceston)
- 1969 – John Burns (East Launceston)
- 1970 – John Davis (Longford)
- 1971 – Stuart Palmer (City-South)
- 1972 – Max Hadley (Scottsdale)
- 1973 – Derek Peardon (City-South)
- 1974 – David Berne (Longford)
- 1975 – Ian Marsh (North Launceston)
- 1976 – Paul Ellis (Launceston)
- 1977 – Stephen Nicholls (Scottsdale)
- 1978 – Ricky Rattray (Scottsdale)
- 1979 – David Noonan (Scottsdale)
- 1980 – Grant Allford
- 1981 – Paul Reinmuth (East Launceston)
- 1982 – Jamie Dennis (Scottsdale)
- 1983 – Rod Thomas (City-South)
- 1984 – Jamie Dennis (Scottsdale)
- 1985 – Stephen Howe
- 1986 – Darren Cook
- 1986 – Malcolm Upston

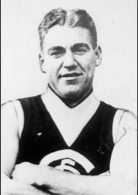
Laurie Nash won two Tasman Shields Trophies
