= Port Adelaide–Norwood rivalry =

Australian rules football's oldest rivalry

Norwood–Port Adelaide rivalry
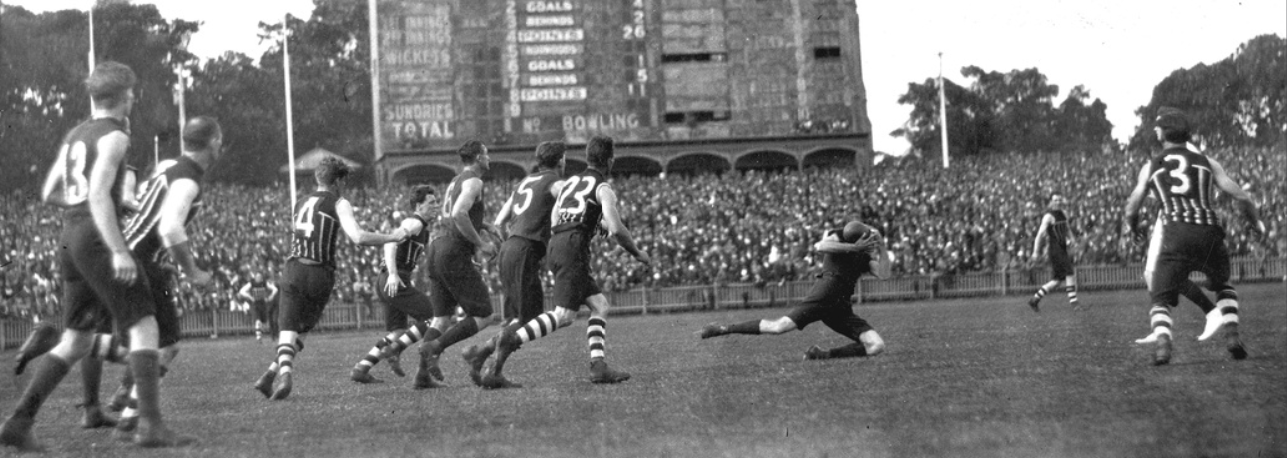
- Norwood playing Port Adelaide at Adelaide Oval
- First meeting: 15 June 1878 (Port Adelaide 0–1 Norwood)
- Latest meeting: 6 July 2025 (Port Adelaide 76-93 Norwood)
- Next meeting: 23 August 2025

Statistics
- Total meetings: 420
- All-time series (SANFL only): Norwood 204 wins Port 199 wins Drawn 17 times
- Largest victory: Norwood def. Port by 122 points round 5, 1997 at Adelaide Oval

The Port Adelaide–Norwood rivalry is Australian rules football's oldest and one of its most intense. It is contested between the Norwood Football Club and the Port Adelaide Football Club. Together, Port Adelaide (36) and Norwood (31) have won 67 South Australian National Football League (SANFL) premierships since the founding of the competition in 1877, 49.3% of all SANFL premierships as of the 2024 SANFL Grand Final. As the SANFL competition has been suspended due to war, only 132 seasons have been played, therefore together Norwood and Port Adelaide have won exactly half of all SANFL premierships awarded. The two clubs have met in finals 50 times, with 17 of those grand finals including two war-time grand finals.

== Origins ==
1888 sketches from The Pictorial Australian covering the recent Port Adelaide vs. Norwood match at Adelaide Oval.

The two clubs first played each other in 1878. The rivalry's origins go back to the early 1880s, when Port Adelaide finally ended Norwood's run of six consecutive premierships. During the 1880s and 1890s, matches between Norwood and Port Adelaide would often attract around 12,000 spectators, which would be equivalent to over 10% of Adelaide's population of the time.

Just as the more faithful amongst the tribes of the East feel it incumbent on them to pay a periodical visit to Mecca, so do lovers of the king of winter games feel it almost an essential duty on their part to journey to the Adelaide Oval on the Queen's Accession Day, in sunshine or rain, to witness a trial of strength between those great and old rivals the Port Adelaide and Norwood clubs.

— Adelaide Advertiser, 21 June 1893.,

In 1960, Norwood would bring Port Adelaide's own run of six premierships to an end, defeating them by 27 points in the preliminary final. As of 2025, the two clubs are the only clubs in the three elite Australian Rules Football leagues (the SANFL, WAFL, and the VFL/AFL) to win six successive premierships.

== Off-field rivals ==
=== Geographic and class divide ===
Adelaide SANFL football grounds

Port Adelaide and Norwood are located on opposite sides of Adelaide, with the north-western side of the city traditionally being associated with blue-collar workers, while the eastern side of the city being white-collar professionals. This economic split is reflected in house prices, with Norwood properties in 2015 commanding an average $900,000, whereas Port Adelaide properties are around a third of that at $315,000.

=== Rival AFL licence bids ===
Talk of a side from South Australia entering the Victorian Football League (VFL) was fast-tracked in 1987 when a team from Western Australia, the West Coast Eagles, and a team from Brisbane, the Brisbane Bears, joined the VFL. This left South Australia as the only mainland state in Australia without a team in an increasingly national competition. By 1989, seven out of ten SANFL clubs were recording losses and the combined income of the SANFL and West Australian Football League (WAFL) had dropped to 40% of the VFL. During early 1990 the SANFL decided to wait three years before making any further decision in regards to fielding a South Australian side in the VFL until it could be done without negatively affecting football within the state. Frustrated with lack of progress, Port Adelaide held secret negotiations in the town of Quorn regarding entering the VFL in 1991. From these discussions, Port Adelaide accepted an invitation from the VFL (which had since been renamed the Australian Football League). The AFL signed a heads of agreement with the club in expectation that Port would enter the competition in 1991, meaning the Port Adelaide Football Club would field two teams, one in the AFL and one in the SANFL. During the 1990 preseason, Port Adelaide played a practice match against Geelong at Football Park in front of 35,000 spectators. When the knowledge of Port Adelaide's negotiations to gain an AFL licence were made public, the rest of the SANFL and many other people across the state saw it as an act of treachery. SANFL clubs made an application to the Supreme Court of South Australia for an injunction against the bid, which Justice Olsson agreed to. The AFL suggested to the SANFL that if they did not want Port Adelaide to join the AFL, they could put forward a counter bid to enter a composite South Australian side into the AFL. After legal action from all parties, the AFL finally agreed to accept the SANFL's bid and the Adelaide Football Club was born.

The fallout from the failed bid resulted in some calling for Port Adelaide to be expelled from the SANFL. However, Port Adelaide continued to compete and continued to dominate. The Magpies followed their triple triumphs from 1988 to 1990 with a premiership in 1992 and three in a row again from 1994 to 1996, then again in 1998 and 1999.

In 1994, the AFL announced it would award a second AFL licence to a South Australian club. Adelaide's Channel 7 broadcaster ran a phone poll asking whether Port Adelaide should get the second licence, with 74% of the 6000 respondents saying 'yes'. However, a licence did not guarantee entry and, although a target year of 1996 was set, this was reliant upon an existing AFL club folding or merging with another. In 1996, the cash-strapped Fitzroy announced it would merge with the Brisbane Bears to form the Brisbane Lions. A spot had finally opened, and it was announced that in 1997, one year later than expected, that Port Adelaide would enter the AFL.

== Famous matches ==
=== 1882 SAFA round 4 ===
What was Port Adelaide's first win over Norwood in its 10th attempt would also be the point of much contestation. Norwood and the SAFA would strip the game of premiership points for a rematch later in the year. This was due to an umpire disallowing a Norwood goal kicked by Watson due to believing it was touched by Port Adelaide player Gliddon.

=== 1882 SAFA round 8 ===
The following game after the annulled result of what would have been Port Adelaide's first win over Norwood was controversial before the game started. Prior to the match there was a misunderstanding about whether opposition players had to present tickets to gain entry to grounds. The gatekeeper at Alberton Oval refused free entry to the Norwood players. As the Norwood players were about to return to the train station recently retired Port Adelaide player Thomas Smith insisted that they be granted free entry. This incident contributed to significant "bad blood" between the clubs according to Adelaide newspapers.

=== 1884 SAFA final round ===
1884 SAFA final round	G	B	Total
Norwood	0	11	0
Port Adelaide	3	13	3
Venue: Adelaide Oval	Crowd: 5,000

The final game of the 1884 season held on Saturday 30 August was essentially a playoff for the premiership as it guaranteed the winner top spot on the association ladder. Therefore, considerable interest was built up for the game with the crowd approximately 5,000 attending. Norwood, having won the last six premierships in a row, met Port Adelaide who were yet to win a premiership. The result comfortably went the way of Port Adelaide, much to the dismay of Norwood.

=== 1889 SAFA Premiership Playoff ===
The first premiership-deciding match in a major Australian rules football was held on Saturday 5 October 1889 in South Australia. At the time Norwood were reigning Australian champions. The game was required as Norwood and Port Adelaide finished the season with an identical win–loss ratio. The teams entered the first break with scores level at three goals each. Only one goal was scored in the second quarter by Norwood, with the wind substantially effecting play. Port wrestled back to even the ledger during the third quarter, but only briefly as Norwood kicked a goal late in the period with the scores into the final quarter being five goals to four. Norwood had the ascendancy in the last period of game and although Port kicking its fifth goal it was to no avail. The final score was seven goals to five in Norwood's favour. The match was one of the seeds to the intense rivalry between Port Adelaide and Norwood.

1889 SAFA Grand Final
Saturday, 5 October (3:00 pm)	Norwood	def.	Port Adelaide	Adelaide Oval (crowd: 11,000)
3.1 (3); 4.1 (4); 5.3 (5); 7.3 (7)	Q1; Q2; Q3; Final	3.1 (3); 3.3 (3); 4.7 (4); 5.9 (5)	Umpires: John Trait
C.Woods 3 O.Bertram, W Dixon, W Guster, J McGaffin 1	Goals	1 Hamilton, Davis, C. Fry, Le Leu, Phillips
Injuries	H.G. Hamilton (cramp)

=== 1904 SAFA Challenge Final ===
1904 SAFA Challenge Final	G	B	Total
Norwood	9	8	62
Port Adelaide	8	10	58
Venue: Jubilee Oval	Crowd: 11,000

The 1904 Grand Final was a memorable one for Norwood, who were down by 35 points at three-quarter time against traditional rival Port Adelaide. Norwood then produced an extraordinary burst of football with a goal by centre half-forward Dean Dawson, followed by two goals each from full-forward Bill Miller and half-forward flanker Stan Robinson. Norwood was only two points down with a minute remaining. Tommy Gibbons held a mark on a seemingly impossible angle. His kick sailed through the goal posts to give Norwood a four-point victory, 9.8 (62) to 8.10 (58).

=== 1957 SANFL Grand Final ===
The 1957 SANFL Grand Final holds the record for the largest crowd (58,924) between the two clubs. This remains the fourth-largest crowd for a football match in South Australia. Norwood led the match for the majority of the day, but Port Adelaide's five-goal-to-two final quarter allowed them to win by 11 points, claiming their fourth premiership in a row.

=== 1960 SANFL Preliminary Final ===
1960 SANFL Preliminary Final	G	B	Total
Port Adelaide	3	14	32
Norwood	8	9	59
Venue: Adelaide Oval

Port Adelaide had finished the home-and-away season as minor premiers and looked on track to make rebound from the previous week's loss against North Adelaide to attempt to win its seventh consecutive premiership. Norwood, who had finished the home-and-away season in third place, was desperate to beat Port Adelaide in the preliminary final in order to prevent the Magpies from bettering its run of six consecutive premierships set from 1878 to 1883. The weather was unfavourable, with a large amount of rain causing the ground to become slush. Commentators considered it one of the most brutal finals played in memory. The game was in the balance heading into the final quarter, with the scoreboard reflecting the scrappy nature of the game: Norwood 3.14 (32) led Port Adelaide 3.10 (28). Norwood managed to adapt to the conditions in the final quarter, kicking 5.1, whereas Port Adelaide could only muster 1.2. The final scores were in favour of Norwood 8.11 (59) to Port Adelaide 3.14 (32). It is a coincidence that Norwood brought an end to Port Adelaide's run of six premierships from 1954–1959, as Port Adelaide did the same to Norwood's run of six between 1878–1883. After the match. during the dark of night, Haydn Bunton Jr and John Vickers went to Black Diamond Corner in Port Adelaide and painted it red and blue.

=== 1996 SANFL Preliminary Final ===
1996 SANFL Preliminary Final	G	B	Total
Norwood	9	8	62
Port Adelaide	9	12	66
Venue: Football Park	Crowd: 18,338

The game was close all the way through, and Norwood was leading by two points deep into time on when Trevor Growden gave Scott Hodges a free kick in the north-west pocket of Football Park. Hodges, from 45 metres out on an angle of 45 degrees, kicked the goal after missing easier shots throughout the match. This would be the two clubs' final encounter before Port Adelaide entered the Australian Football League.

== Venues ==
The vast majority of the games played between Port Adelaide and Norwood have been at Alberton Oval, Norwood Oval, Football Park, and Adelaide Oval.

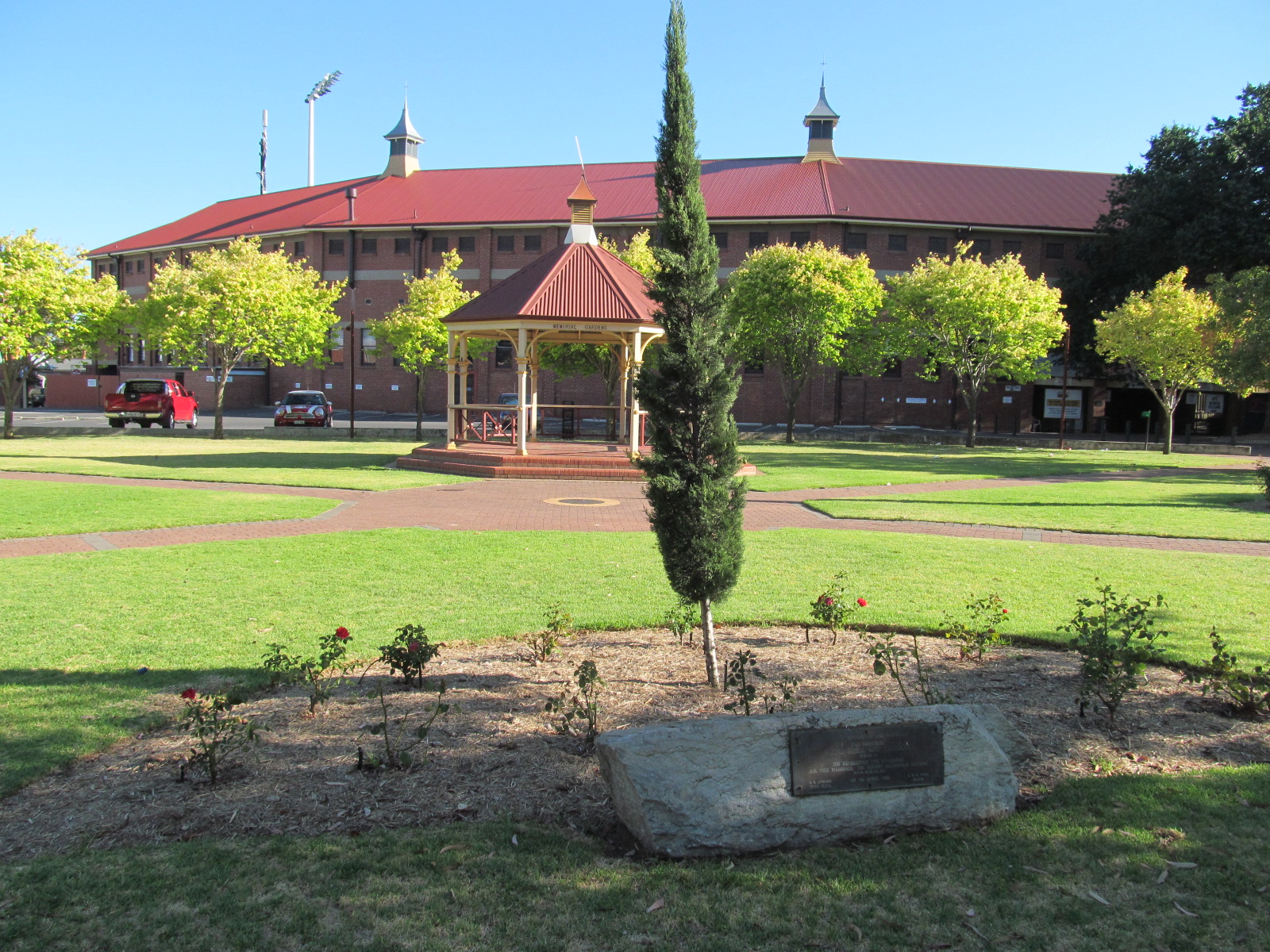
Norwood Oval

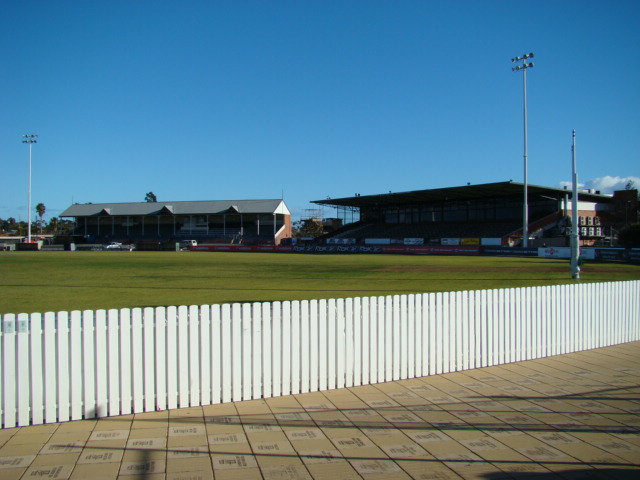
Alberton Oval

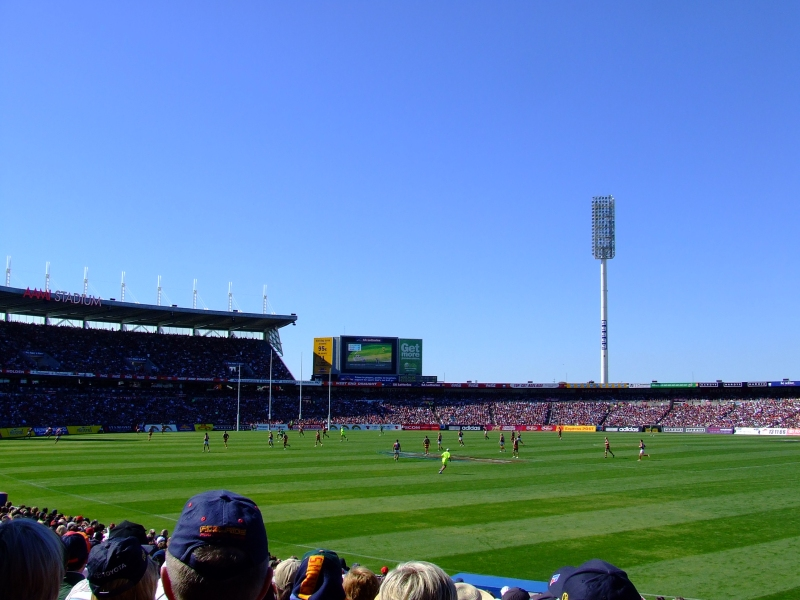
Football Park

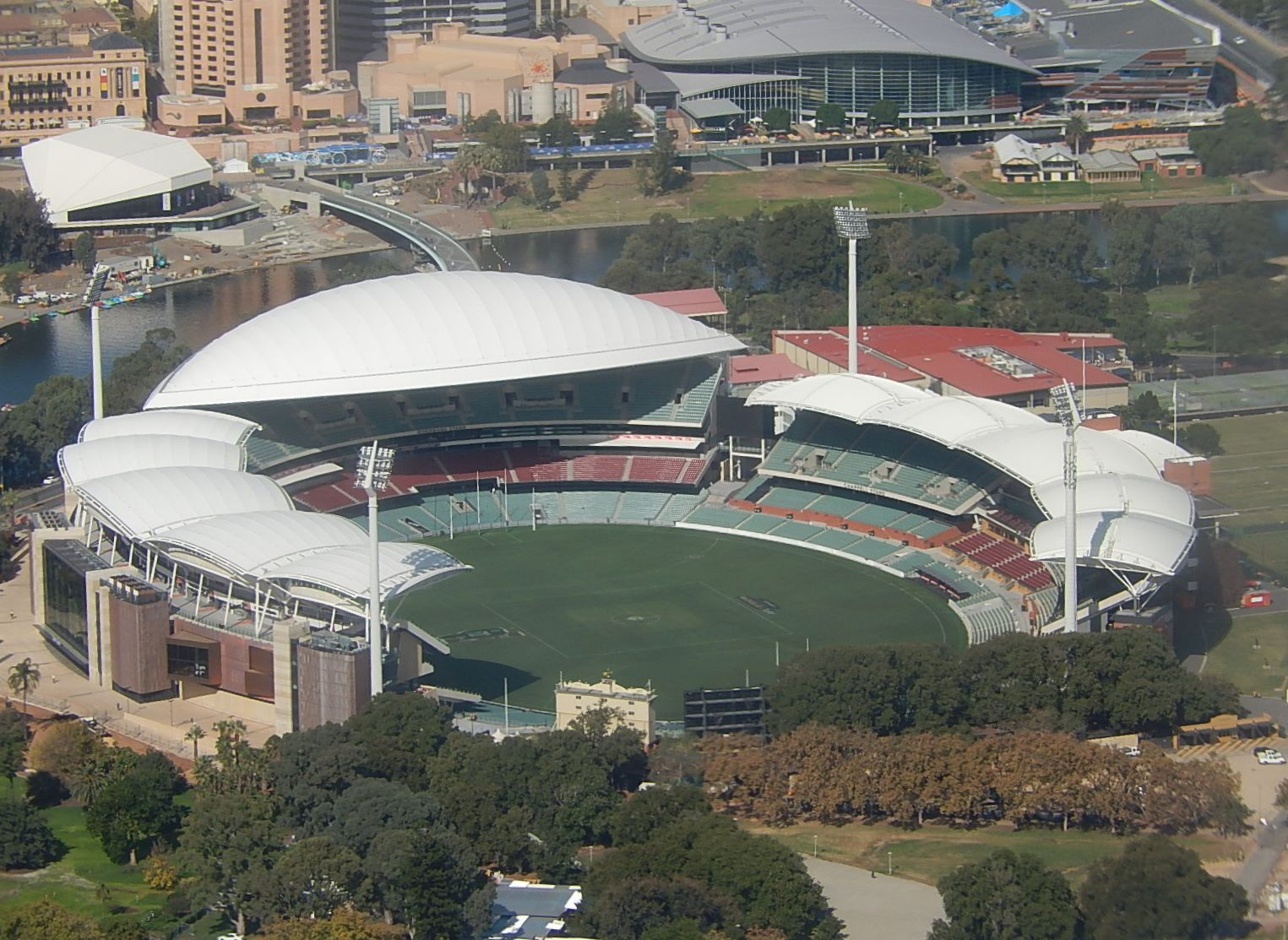
Adelaide Oval

== Senior matches (1877–1996) ==
South Australian Football Association
Year	Date	Rd	Home team	Score	Away team	Score	Football ground	Crowd	Winner	M
1878	15/6	5	Port Adelaide	0._ (0)	Norwood	1._ (1)	Glanville Estate	600	Norwood	1
1878	10/8	13	Norwood	0.4 (0)	Port Adelaide	0.4 (0)	East Park Lands	3,000	Draw	0
1879	14/6	4	Port Adelaide	1._ (0)	Norwood	3._ (3)	Glanville Estate	1,000	Norwood	2
1879	23/8	11	Norwood	3._ (3)	Port Adelaide	1._ (1)	East Park Lands	3,000	Norwood	2
1880	8/5	1	Norwood	5.17 (5)	Port Adelaide	0.3 (0)	East Park Lands	1,500	Norwood	5
1880	17/7	11	Port Adelaide	0.4 (0)	Norwood	0.18 (0)	Alberton Oval	750	Draw	
1881	14/5	2	Norwood	4.8 (4)	Port Adelaide	1.3 (1)	Adelaide Oval	1,500	Norwood	3
1881	2/7	7	Port Adelaide	1.11 (1)	Norwood	1.16 (1)	Alberton Oval		Draw	
1881	24/9	16	Norwood	6.14 (6)	Port Adelaide	0.0 (0)	East Park Lands		Norwood	6
1882	27/5	4	Norwood	1.16 (1)	Port Adelaide	2.11 (2)	Adelaide Oval		Result Annulled	1
1882	15/7	9	Port Adelaide	0.2 (0)	Norwood	3.17 (3)	Alberton Oval		Norwood	3
1883	12 May	2	Port Adelaide	1.7 (1)	Norwood	4.9 (4)	Alberton Oval	1,000	Norwood	3
1883	21 July	10	Norwood	1.9 (1)	Port Adelaide	5.7 (5)	Adelaide Oval	1,300	Port Adelaide	4
1883	25/8	15	Port Adelaide	3.12 (3)	Norwood	6.17 (6)	Alberton Oval		Norwood	3
1883	22/9	19	Norwood	5.22 (5)	Port Adelaide	1.7 (1)	Kensington Oval		Norwood	4
1884	17 May	3	Port Adelaide	2.10 (2)	Norwood	3.15 (3)	Alberton Oval	1,500	Norwood	1
1884	20 June	8	Norwood	3.3 (3)	Port Adelaide	3.17 (3)	Adelaide Oval	6,000	Draw	
1884	2/8	11	Port Adelaide	8.11 (8)	Norwood	3.10 (3)	Alberton Oval		Port Adelaide	5
1884	30/8	13	Norwood	0.11 (0)	Port Adelaide	3.15 (3)	Adelaide Oval	5,000	Port Adelaide	3
1885	4 July	6	Port Adelaide	2.12 (2)	Norwood	3.8 (3)	Alberton Oval	2,000	Norwood	1
1885	25 July	9	Norwood	3.11 (3)	Port Adelaide	2.6 (2)	Adelaide Oval	1,000	Norwood	1
1885	2/8	13	Port Adelaide	1.13 (1)	Norwood	6.16 (6)	Alberton Oval	2,000	Norwood	6
1885	12/9	16	Norwood	4.14 (4)	Port Adelaide	2.8 (2)	Kensington Oval	800	Norwood	2
1886	8 May	3	Port Adelaide	1.5 (1)	Norwood	4.7 (4)	Alberton Oval	1,500	Norwood	3
1886	22 May	5	Norwood	4.9 (4)	Port Adelaide	3.6 (3)	Adelaide Oval	1,500	Norwood	1
1886	5 June	8	Norwood	5.13 (5)	Port Adelaide	2.3 (2)	Kensington Oval	500	Norwood	3
1886	21 June	11	Norwood	8.13 (8)	Port Adelaide	2.11 (2)	Adelaide Oval	6,000	Norwood	6
1886	24 July	13	Port Adelaide	3.13 (3)	Norwood	3.7 (3)	Alberton Oval	1,000	Draw	
1887	21 May	3	Port Adelaide	3.4 (3)	Norwood	3.7 (3)	Alberton Oval	3,000	Draw	
1887	20 June	8	Norwood	6.16 (6)	Port Adelaide	4.3 (4)	Adelaide Oval	11,000	Norwood	2
1887	23 July	11	Port Adelaide	4.1 (4)	Norwood	4.8 (4)	Alberton Oval	3,500	Draw	
1887	20/8	15	Norwood	5.11 (5)	Port Adelaide	2.9 (1)	Adelaide Oval	8,000	Norwood	3
1888	20 June	9	Norwood	2.7 (2)	Port Adelaide	2.5 (2)	Adelaide Oval	9,000	Draw	
1888	28 July	13	Norwood	11.21 (11)	Port Adelaide	3.6 (3)	Kensington Oval	7,000	Norwood	8
1888	22/9		Port Adelaide	6.11 (6)	Norwood	5.14 (5)	Alberton Oval	2,500	Port Adelaide	1
1889	11 May		Norwood	7.5 (7)	Port Adelaide	2.7 (2)	Kensington Oval	4,000	Norwood	5
1889	20 June		Norwood	6.6 (6)	Port Adelaide	3.4 (3)	Adelaide Oval	8,000	Norwood	3
1889	29 July		Port Adelaide	3.5 (3)	Norwood	2.6 (2)	Alberton Oval	6,500	Port Adelaide	1
1889	24/8		Norwood	3.8 (3)	Port Adelaide	3.7 (3)	Adelaide Oval	8,000	Draw	
1889	5/10	GF	Norwood	7.4 (7)	Port Adelaide	5.9 (5)	Adelaide Oval	11,000	Norwood	2
1890	17 May	2	Port Adelaide	1.4 (1)	Norwood	2.9 (2)	Alberton Oval	3,000	Norwood	1
1890	20 June	6	Norwood	3.3 (3)	Port Adelaide	5.10 (5)	Adelaide Oval	10,000	Port Adelaide	2
1890	26 July	10	Norwood	6.7 (6)	Port Adelaide	3.7 (3)	Kensington Oval	8,000	Norwood	3
1890	29/8	15	Norwood	2.7 (2)	Port Adelaide	3.2 (3)	Adelaide Oval	11,500	Port Adelaide	1
1891	16 May	3	Norwood	4.6 (4)	Port Adelaide	9.3 (9)	Kensington Oval	5,000	Port Adelaide	5
1891	22 June	9	Norwood	6.11 (6)	Port Adelaide	5.6 (5)	Adelaide Oval	13,000	Norwood	1
1891	11 July	12	Norwood	1.3 (3)	Port Adelaide	6.9 (6)	Adelaide Oval	8,000	Port Adelaide	5
1891	5/9	19	Norwood	5.4 (5)	Port Adelaide	3.4 (3)	Adelaide Oval	10,000	Norwood	2
1892	21 May	3	Port Adelaide	9.4 (9)	Norwood	8.7 (8)	Kensington Oval	4,000	Port Adelaide	1
1892	20 June		Norwood	2.11 (2)	Port Adelaide	3.4 (3)	Adelaide Oval	12,000	Port Adelaide	1
1892	1 July		Norwood	5.5 (5)	Port Adelaide	2.6 (2)	Adelaide Oval	6,000	Norwood	3
1892	10/9		Norwood	5.10 (5)	Port Adelaide	8.15 (8)	Adelaide Oval	4,000	Port Adelaide	3
1893	3 June		Norwood	6.8 (6)	Port Adelaide	5.4 (5)	Adelaide Oval	8,500	Norwood	1
1893	20 June		Norwood	5.9 (5)	Port Adelaide	4.5 (4)	Adelaide Oval	12,000	Norwood	1
1893	1 July		Norwood	1.6 (1)	Port Adelaide	5.3 (5)	Adelaide Oval	6,000	Port Adelaide	4
1893	10/8		Norwood	8.5 (8)	Port Adelaide	6.4 (6)	Adelaide Oval	5,000	Norwood	2
1893	23/9		Norwood	7.10 (7)	Port Adelaide	7.3 (7)	Adelaide Oval	1,500	Draw	
1894	5 May	1	Norwood	7.11 (7)	Port Adelaide	5.5 (5)	Adelaide Oval	5,000	Norwood	3
1894	9 June	6	Norwood	8.9 (8)	Port Adelaide	7.9 (7)	Adelaide Oval	5,500	Norwood	1
1894	25 June	8	Norwood	9.7 (9)	Port Adelaide	2.6 (2)	Adelaide Oval	9,000	Norwood	7
1894	14 July	12	Norwood	5.3 (5)	Port Adelaide	7.7 (7)	Adelaide Oval	1,800	Port Adelaide	2
1894	8/9	17	Norwood	7.10 (7)	Port Adelaide	3.3 (3)	Adelaide Oval	1,500	Norwood	4
1894	30/9	20	Norwood	7.6 (7)	Port Adelaide	6.7 (6)	Adelaide Oval	3,000	Norwood	1
1895	21 May		Norwood	9.9 (9)	Port Adelaide	4.8 (4)	Kensington Oval	1,500	Norwood	5
1895	24 June		Norwood	3.10 (3)	Port Adelaide	3.8 (3)	Adelaide Oval	8,000	Draw	
1895	27 July		Norwood	5.3 (5)	Port Adelaide	3.8 (2)	Adelaide Oval	3,500	Norwood	2
1895	21/9		Norwood	8.9 (8)	Port Adelaide	4.4 (4)	Adelaide Oval		Norwood	4
1896	6 June	6	Norwood	5.6 (5)	Port Adelaide	7.9 (7)	Adelaide Oval		Port Adelaide	2
1896	22 June	9	Norwood	2.10 (2)	Port Adelaide	0.7 (0)	Adelaide Oval	7,500	Norwood	2
1896	4 July	11	Norwood	10.11 (10)	Port Adelaide	5.7 (5)	Adelaide Oval	2,000	Norwood	5
1896	25 July	14	Norwood	6.11 (6)	Port Adelaide	3.6 (3)	Adelaide Oval		Norwood	3
1896	15/8	17	Norwood	6.13 (6)	Port Adelaide	2.3 (2)	Adelaide Oval		Norwood	4
1897	15 May	3	Norwood	3.11 (29)	Port Adelaide	4.2 (26)	Adelaide Oval		Norwood	3
1897	17 July	13	Norwood	3.7 (25)	Port Adelaide	3.10 (28)	Adelaide Oval		Port Adelaide	3
1897	31 July	15	Norwood	5.1 (31)	Port Adelaide	5.7 (37)	Adelaide Oval	4,000	Port Adelaide	6
1897	1/9	20	Norwood	2.6 (30)	Port Adelaide	2.6 (30)	Adelaide Oval	3,000	Draw	
1898	30 May	4	Norwood	7.2 (44)	Port Adelaide	5.6 (36)	Adelaide Oval	4,500	Norwood	8
1898	9 July	9	Norwood	4.9 (33)	Port Adelaide	6.5 (41)	Adelaide Oval		Port Adelaide	9
1898	30 July	12	Norwood	3.8 (26)	Port Adelaide	10.15 (75)	Adelaide Oval		Port Adelaide	49
1898	20/8	14	Norwood	3.1 (19)	Port Adelaide	10.14 (74)	Adelaide Oval		Port Adelaide	55
1898	3/9	SF	Port Adelaide	4.16 (40)	Norwood	2.6 (18)	Adelaide Oval		Port Adelaide	22
1899	29 May	4	Norwood	6.3 (39)	Port Adelaide	3.6 (24)	Adelaide Oval	4,000	Norwood	15
1899	15 July	11	Norwood	5.6 (36)	Port Adelaide	4.7 (31)	Adelaide Oval		Norwood	5
1899	5/8	14	Norwood	5.5 (35)	Port Adelaide	3.7 (25)	Adelaide Oval		Norwood	10
1900	28 May	5	Norwood	9.5 (59)	Port Adelaide	5.5 (35)	Adelaide Oval		Norwood	24
1900	23 June	9	Norwood	4.10 (34)	Port Adelaide	1.2 (8)	Adelaide Oval		Norwood	26
1900	7 July	12	Norwood	3.11 (29)	Port Adelaide	3.5 (23)	Adelaide Oval		Norwood	6
1900	18/8	17	Norwood	3.4 (22)	Port Adelaide	3.2 (20)	Adelaide Oval		Norwood	2
1901	25 May	4	Norwood	8.11 (59)	Port Adelaide	2.11 (23)	Norwood Oval	1,000	Norwood	36
1901	13 July	11	Norwood	6.7 (43)	Port Adelaide	5.3 (33)	Adelaide Oval		Norwood	10
1901	14/9	20	Port Adelaide	8.13 (61)	Norwood	1.5 (11)	Alberton Oval		Port Adelaide	50
1901	12/10	GF	Norwood	4.9 (33)	Port Adelaide	4.5 (29)	Adelaide Oval	7,000	Norwood	4
1902	9 June	7	Norwood	6.8 (44)	Port Adelaide	7.8 (50)	Adelaide Oval		Port Adelaide	6
1902	23/8	15	Norwood	2.5 (17)	Port Adelaide	7.6 (48)	Norwood Oval		Port Adelaide	31
1903	30 May	5	Port Adelaide	9.13 (67)	Norwood	2.8 (20)	Alberton Oval		Port Adelaide	47
1903	8/8	12	Norwood	3.9 (27)	Port Adelaide	6.6 (42)	Adelaide Oval		Port Adelaide	15
1903	1/9	SF	Port Adelaide	7.9 (51)	Norwood	4.11 (35)	Adelaide Oval	11,000	Port Adelaide	16
1904	21 May	3	Port Adelaide	5.7 (37)	Norwood	5.7 (37)	Alberton Oval		Draw	
1904	23 July	10	Norwood	5.12 (42)	Port Adelaide	7.6 (48)	Norwood Oval		Port Adelaide	6
1904	17/9	GF	Norwood	9.8 (62)	Port Adelaide	8.10 (58)	Adelaide Oval	15,000	Norwood	4
1905	5 June	5	Norwood	6.12 (48)	Port Adelaide	4.8 (32)	Adelaide Oval	12,000	Norwood	16
1905	12/8	12	Port Adelaide	9.6 (60)	Norwood	4.4 (28)	Alberton Oval		Port Adelaide	32
South Australian Football League
1906	19 May	3	Norwood	3.9 (27)	Port Adelaide	7.5 (47)	Alberton Oval	7,500	Port Adelaide	20
1906	27 July	11	Norwood	11.13 (79)	Port Adelaide	7.9 (51)	Adelaide Oval		Norwood	28
1907	11 May	2	Port Adelaide	5.14 (44)	Norwood	4.7 (31)	Alberton Oval	6,500	Port Adelaide	13
1907	20/7	10	Norwood	5.4 (34)	Port Adelaide	6.12 (48)	Adelaide Oval	20,000	Port Adelaide	14
1907	14/9	SF	Norwood	7.14 (56)	Port Adelaide	6.6 (42)	Adelaide Oval	20,000	Norwood	14
1907	21/9	GF	Norwood	8.7 (55)	Port Adelaide	3.9 (27)	Adelaide Oval	25,000	Norwood	28
1908	8 June	6	Norwood	4.5 (39)	Port Adelaide	3.9 (27)	Adelaide Oval	22,000	Norwood	12
1908	1/8	13	Norwood	10.11 (71)	Port Adelaide	7.8 (50)	Norwood Oval	15,000	Norwood	21
1908	12/9	SF	Norwood	11.12 (78)	Port Adelaide	6.4 (40)	Adelaide Oval	20,000	Norwood	38
1909	15 May	3	Port Adelaide	1.4 (10)	Norwood	0.5 (5)	Alberton Oval	4,500	Port Adelaide	5
1909	24 July	11	Norwood	3.6 (24)	Port Adelaide	9.7 (61)	Adelaide Oval	8,000	Port Adelaide	37
1909	4/9	SF	Norwood	11.12 (78)	Port Adelaide	3.10 (28)	Adelaide Oval	22,000	Norwood	50
1910	27 June	7	Norwood	6.11 (47)	Port Adelaide	10.7 (67)	Adelaide Oval	15,000	Port Adelaide	20
1910	27/8	14	Norwood	9.9 (63)	Port Adelaide	10.7 (67)	Norwood Oval	12,000	Port Adelaide	4
1911	27 May	4	Norwood	3.13 (31)	Port Adelaide	8.14 (62)	Norwood Oval		Port Adelaide	31
1911	22 July	10	Port Adelaide	16.21 (117)	Norwood	6.4 (40)	Alberton Oval		Port Adelaide	27
1912	25 May	4	Norwood	4.9 (33)	Port Adelaide	10.21 (81)	Norwood Oval		Port Adelaide	48
1912	29 June	9	Port Adelaide	8.7 (55)	Norwood	5.10 (40)	Alberton Oval		Port Adelaide	15
1913	17 May	3	Port Adelaide	10.11 (71)	Norwood	5.2 (32)	Alberton Oval		Port Adelaide	39
1913	21 June	8	Norwood	7.9 (51)	Port Adelaide	13.9 (87)	Adelaide Oval		Port Adelaide	36
1914	30 May	5	Norwood	8.5 (53)	Port Adelaide	13.13 (91)	Adelaide Oval	9,000	Port Adelaide	38
1914	18 July	12	Port Adelaide	19.17 (131)	Norwood	7.8 (50)	Alberton Oval		Port Adelaide	81
1915	12 June	6	Norwood	6.5 (41)	Port Adelaide	10.18 (78)	Norwood Oval	2,000	Port Adelaide	37
1915	14/6	13	Port Adelaide	11.15 (81)	Norwood	2.8 (20)	Alberton Oval		Port Adelaide	61
1919	14 June	7	Norwood	5.8 (38)	Port Adelaide	15.18 (108)	Norwood Oval		Port Adelaide	70
1919	16/8	14	Port Adelaide	10.14 (74)	Norwood	6.9 (45)	Alberton Oval		Port Adelaide	29
1920	1 May	1	Norwood	11.12 (78)	Port Adelaide	7.10 (52)	Norwood Oval		Norwood	26
1920	10 July	10	Port Adelaide	7.13 (55)	Norwood	5.6 (36)	Alberton Oval		Port Adelaide	19
1920	11/9	SF	Norwood	9.9 (63)	Port Adelaide	5.11 (41)	Adelaide Oval	20,000	Norwood	22
1921	9 May	1	Norwood	9.7 (61)	Port Adelaide	5.11 (41)	Norwood Oval		Norwood	20
1921	2 July	9	Port Adelaide	12.14 (86)	Norwood	5.16 (46)	Alberton Oval		Port Adelaide	46
1921	2/10	SF	Port Adelaide	10.6 (66)	Norwood	10.6 (66)	Adelaide Oval	24,000	Draw	
1921	8/10	GF	Port Adelaide	4.8 (32)	Norwood	3.6 (24)	Adelaide Oval	34,800	Port Adelaide	8
1922	5 June	5	Norwood	17.11 (113)	Port Adelaide	4.6 (30)	Adelaide Oval		Norwood	83
1922	2/9	14	Port Adelaide	9.12 (66)	Norwood	9.14 (68)	Alberton Oval		Norwood	2
1923	19 May	3	Norwood	12.16 (88)	Port Adelaide	7.8 (50)	Norwood Oval		Norwood	38
1923	11/8	12	Port Adelaide	18.8 (116)	Norwood	8.7 (55)	Alberton Oval	10,000	Port Adelaide	61
1924	10 May	2	Norwood	7.15 (57)	Port Adelaide	9.12 (66)	Norwood Oval		Port Adelaide	9
1924	28 June	9	Port Adelaide	10.18 (78)	Norwood	10.10 (70)	Alberton Oval		Port Adelaide	8
1925	13 June	7	Port Adelaide	11.14 (80)	Norwood	10.10 (70)	Alberton Oval		Port Adelaide	10
1925	5/9	14	Norwood	12.13 (85)	Port Adelaide	8.8 (56)	Norwood Oval		Norwood	29
1926	29 May	5	Norwood	9.10 (64)	Port Adelaide	8.18 (66)	Norwood Oval		Port Adelaide	2
1926	14/8	13	Port Adelaide	17.15 (117)	Norwood	11.8 (74)	Alberton Oval		Port Adelaide	43
South Australian National Football League
1927	28 May	5	Port Adelaide	16.14 (110)	Norwood	10.9 (69)	Alberton Oval		Port Adelaide	41
1927	27/8	16	Norwood	12.10 (82)	Port Adelaide	10.4 (74)	Norwood Oval		Norwood	8
1928	5 May	2	Port Adelaide	10.6 (66)	Norwood	8.12 (60)	Alberton Oval		Port Adelaide	6
1928	7 July	10	Norwood	9.15 (69)	Port Adelaide	8.14 (62)	Norwood Oval		Norwood	7
1928	25 August		Norwood		Port Adelaide		Sydney Showground	12,500	Norwood	5
1928	22 September	SF	Norwood	8.13 (61)	Port Adelaide	3.2 (20)	Adelaide Oval	24,800	Norwood	28
1928	6/10	GF	Port Adelaide	15.14 (104)	Norwood	7.14 (56)	Adelaide Oval	35,700	Port Adelaide	48
1929	11 May	3	Port Adelaide	13.17 (95)	Norwood	9.8 (62)	Alberton Oval		Port Adelaide	33
1929	7/9	17	Norwood	9.11 (65)	Port Adelaide	8.12 (60)	Norwood Oval		Norwood	5
1929	5/10	GF	Norwood	16.14 (110)	Port Adelaide	10.9 (69)	Adelaide Oval	35,504	Norwood	41
1930	14 June	8	Norwood	14.19 (103)	Port Adelaide	15.13 (103)	Norwood Oval		Draw	
1930	6/9	17	Port Adelaide	16.12 (108)	Norwood	15.17 (107)	Alberton Oval		Port Adelaide	1
1930	13/9	SF	Port Adelaide	7.11 (53)	Norwood	6.14 (50)	Adelaide Oval	18,153	Port Adelaide	3
1931	16 May	3	Port Adelaide	23.20 (158)	Norwood	8.9 (57)	Alberton Oval	6,080	Port Adelaide	101
1931	11 July	10	Norwood	10.13 (73)	Port Adelaide	8.6 (54)	Norwood Oval	3,726	Norwood	19
1932	7 May	2	Norwood	8.15 (63)	Port Adelaide	11.8 (74)	Norwood Oval	7,566	Port Adelaide	11
1932	2 July	9	Port Adelaide	10.15 (75)	Norwood	7.7 (49)	Alberton Oval	5,760	Port Adelaide	26
1933	6 May	2	Norwood	10.9 (69)	Port Adelaide	9.15 (69)	Adelaide Oval	6,063	Draw	
1933	24 June	9	Norwood	13.9 (87)	Port Adelaide	13.18 (96)	Norwood Oval	6,600	Port Adelaide	9
1934	19 May	4	Norwood	15.25 (115)	Port Adelaide	12.12 (84)	Norwood Oval		Norwood	31
1934	21 July	11	Port Adelaide	18.11 (119)	Norwood	10.14 (74)	Alberton Oval		Port Adelaide	45
1935	18 May	4	Norwood	18.14 (122)	Port Adelaide	17.9 (111)	Norwood Oval	10,100	Norwood	11
1935	13 July	11	Port Adelaide	20.12 (132)	Norwood	8.16 (64)	Alberton Oval	6,100	Port Adelaide	68
1936	29 June	9	Norwood	15.16 (106)	Port Adelaide	18.11 (119)	Adelaide Oval	29,000	Port Adelaide	13
1936	5/	17	Norwood	18.19 (127)	Port Adelaide	21.11 (143)	Norwood Oval	10,900	Port Adelaide	16
1937	12 May	4	Norwood	8.15 (63)	Port Adelaide	9.14 (68)	Adelaide Oval	23,000	Port Adelaide	5
1937	26 June	10	Norwood	17.18 (120)	Port Adelaide	20.15 (135)	Norwood Oval	17,700	Port Adelaide	10
1937	4/9	17	Port Adelaide	16.20 (116)	Norwood	14.7 (91)	Alberton Oval	10,846	Port Adelaide	25
1937	18/9	SF	Port Adelaide	17.21 (123)	Norwood	9.6 (60)	Adelaide Oval	22,891	Port Adelaide	63
1938	13 June	8	Norwood	19.11 (125)	Port Adelaide	13.16 (94)	Adelaide Oval	27,746	Norwood	31
1938	6/8	14	Port Adelaide	11.14 (80)	Norwood	12.9 (81)	Alberton Oval	5,000	Norwood	1
1938	3/9	17	Norwood	18.19 (127)	Port Adelaide	12.14 (86)	Norwood Oval	8,000	Norwood	41
1938	24/9	PF	Port Adelaide	19.25 (139)	Norwood	12.13 (85)	Adelaide Oval	26,047	Port Adelaide	54
1939	6 May	3	Norwood	15.17 (107)	Port Adelaide	14.15 (99)	Norwood Oval	13,000	Norwood	8
1939	8 July	10	Port Adelaide	17.21 (123)	Norwood	13.16 (94)	Alberton Oval	9,010	Port Adelaide	29
1940	18 May	5	Norwood	13.17 (95)	Port Adelaide	17.21 (123)	Norwood Oval	12,000	Port Adelaide	28
1940	20 July	13	Port Adelaide	14.11 (95)	Norwood	13.10 (88)	Alberton Oval	5,600	Port Adelaide	7
1941	3 May	2	Port Adelaide	12.17 (89)	Norwood	22.21 (153)	Alberton Oval		Norwood	64
1941	21 June	9	Norwood	14.17 (101)	Port Adelaide	18.20 (128)	Norwood Oval		Port Adelaide	27
1942	23 May	2	Norwood-NthA	14.13 (97)	Port-Torrens	16.18 (114)	Adelaide Oval		Port Adelaide	17
1942	18 July	5	Norwood-NthA	17.11 (113)	Port-Torrens	12.7 (89)	Adelaide Oval		Norwood-NthA	24
1942	14/8	8	Norwood-NthA	14.7 (91)	Port-Torrens	20.14 (134)	Norwood Oval		Port-Torrens	43
1943	22 May	2	Port-Torrens	16.19 (115)	Norwood-NthA	12.12 (84)	Alberton Oval		Port-Torrens	31
1943	19 June	5	Norwood-NthA	12.7 (79)	Port-Torrens	11.11 (77)	Adelaide Oval		Norwood-NthA	2
1943	24 July	8	Norwood-NthA	13.15 (93)	Port-Torrens	9.15 (69)	Norwood Oval		Norwood-NthA	24
1943	30/9	GF	Norwood-NthA	12.10 (82)	Port-Torrens	8.13 (61)	Adelaide Oval	42,000	Norwood-NthA	21
1944	20 May	1	Norwood-NthA	18.16 (124)	Port-Torrens	20.16 (136)	Adelaide Oval		Port-Torrens	12
1944	17 June	4	Norwood-NthA	15.6 (98)	Port-Torrens	16.21 (117)	Norwood Oval		Port-Torrens	19
1944	8 July	7	Norwood-NthA	17.13 (115)	Port-Torrens	27.12 (174)	Adelaide Oval		Port-Torrens	59
1944	30/9	GF	Norwood-NthA	9.7 (61)	Port-Torrens	7.13 (55)	Adelaide Oval	30,000	Norwood-NthA	6
1945	12 May	3	Norwood	7.5 (47)	Port Adelaide	10.12 (72)	Kensington Oval		Port Adelaide	25
1945	23 June	9	Port Adelaide	9.18 (72)	Norwood	9.8 (62)	Alberton Oval		Port Adelaide	10
1945	18/8	15	Norwood	11.18 (84)	Port Adelaide	14.12 (96)	Norwood Oval		Port Adelaide	12
1945	15/9	SF	Port Adelaide	16.14 (110)	Norwood	13.8 (86)	Adelaide Oval	36,383	Port Adelaide	34
1946	11 May	2	Port Adelaide	11.8 (74)	Norwood	10.12 (72)	Alberton Oval		Port Adelaide	2
1946	20 July	12	Norwood	13.15 (93)	Port Adelaide	6.9 (45)	Norwood Oval		Norwood	48
1946	21/9	SF	Port Adelaide	10.17 (77)	Norwood	14.19 (103)	Adelaide Oval	34,603	Norwood	26
1946	5/10	GF	Norwood	13.14 (92)	Port Adelaide	9.10 (64)	Adelaide Oval	53,473	Norwood	28
1947	26 April	1	Port Adelaide	15.13 (103)	Norwood	13.9 (87)	Alberton Oval	12,750	Port Adelaide	16
1947	21 June	9	Norwood	15.17 (107)	Port Adelaide	13.17 (95)	Norwood Oval	20,186	Norwood	12
1947	20/9	SF	Norwood	14.11 (95)	Port Adelaide	13.14 (92)	Adelaide Oval	39,665	Norwood	3
1948	1 May	2	Norwood	14.9 (93)	Port Adelaide	10.23 (83)	Norwood Oval	10,800	Norwood	10
1948	10 July	10	Port Adelaide	11.12 (78)	Norwood	15.10 (100)	Alberton Oval		Norwood	22
1949	28 May	6	Norwood	10.10 (70)	Port Adelaide	19.13 (127)	Kensington Oval		Port Adelaide	57
1949	30 July	13	Port Adelaide	6.21 (57)	Norwood	11.12 (78)	Alberton Oval		Norwood	21
1949	3/9	17	Norwood	16.17 (113)	Port Adelaide	13.13 (91)	Norwood Oval		Norwood	22
1950	3 June	7	Norwood	11.16 (82)	Port Adelaide	8.13 (61)	Norwood Oval		Norwood	21
1950	12/8	14	Port Adelaide	14.12 (96)	Norwood	12.15 (87)	Alberton Oval		Port Adelaide	9
1951	28 April	2	Norwood	7.16 (58)	Port Adelaide	10.14 (74)	Norwood Oval		Port Adelaide	16
1951	11 June	7	Norwood	6.11 (47)	Port Adelaide	8.4 (52)	Adelaide Oval	18,000	Port Adelaide	5
1951	18/8	16	Port Adelaide	15.13 (103)	Norwood	9.5 (59)	Alberton Oval	13,000	Port Adelaide	44
1952	17 May	4	Norwood	9.5 (59)	Port Adelaide	9.14 (68)	Kensington Oval		Port Adelaide	9
1952	30/8	16	Port Adelaide	15.12 (102)	Norwood	10.13 (73)	Alberton Oval		Port Adelaide	29
1952	27/9	PF	Port Adelaide	6.14 (50)	Norwood	8.13 (61)	Adelaide Oval	42,000	Norwood	11
1953	9 May	3	Port Adelaide	10.16 (76)	Norwood	12.13 (85)	Alberton Oval		Norwood	9
1953	4 July	11	Norwood	11.12 (78)	Port Adelaide	13.10 (88)	Norwood Oval		Port Adelaide	10
1954	29 May	6	Port Adelaide	14.10 (94)	Norwood	4.13 (37)	Port Pirie	7,203	Port Adelaide	57
1954	31 July	13	Port Adelaide	12.9 (81)	Norwood	15.13 (103)	Alberton Oval	15,000	Norwood	22
1955	7 May	3	Port Adelaide	11.10 (76)	Norwood	10.14 (74)	Alberton Oval		Port Adelaide	2
1955	2 July	10	Norwood	11.10 (76)	Port Adelaide	13.16 (94)	Norwood Oval		Port Adelaide	18
1955	17/9	SF	Port Adelaide	12.12 (84)	Norwood	15.18 (108)	Adelaide Oval	36,902	Norwood	24
1955	1/10	GF	Port Adelaide	15.11 (101)	Norwood	5.8 (38)	Adelaide Oval	44,826	Port Adelaide	63
1956	25/4	2	Port Adelaide	13.18 (96)	Norwood	7.15 (57)	Adelaide Oval		Port Adelaide	39
1956	2 June	7	Norwood	11.9 (75)	Port Adelaide	27.22 (184)	Norwood Oval		Port Adelaide	109
1956	11/8	15	Port Adelaide	13.11 (89)	Norwood	7.6 (48)	Alberton Oval		Port Adelaide	41
1957	4 May	3	Port Adelaide	14.17 (101)	Norwood	7.17 (59)	Kensington Oval		Port Adelaide	42
1957	29 June	10	Norwood	12.24 (96)	Port Adelaide	13.8 (86)	Norwood Oval		Norwood	10
1957	24/8	17	Port Adelaide	26.17 (173)	Norwood	8.8 (56)	Alberton Oval		Port Adelaide	117
1957	28/9	GF	Norwood	13.16 (94)	Port Adelaide	15.15 (105)	Adelaide Oval	58,924	Port Adelaide	11
1958	25 April	1	Norwood	10.8 (68)	Port Adelaide	13.19 (97)	Adelaide Oval		Port Adelaide	29
1958	14 June	8	Port Adelaide	15.12 (102)	Norwood	8.9 (57)	Alberton Oval		Port Adelaide	45
1958	9/8	15	Norwood	5.10 (40)	Port Adelaide	10.22 (82)	Norwood Oval		Port Adelaide	42
1958	6/9	SF	Port Adelaide	16.25 (121)	Norwood	10.16 (76)	Adelaide Oval	38,035	Port Adelaide	45
1959	2 May	2	Norwood	7.11 (53)	Port Adelaide	22.14 (146)	Kensington Oval		Port Adelaide	93
1959	11 July	11	Port Adelaide	13.18 (96)	Norwood	8.7 (55)	Alberton Oval		Port Adelaide	41
1959	15/8	15	Norwood	8.8 (56)	Port Adelaide	7.17 (59)	Norwood Oval		Port Adelaide	3
1960	21 May	5	Port Adelaide	12.21 (93)	Norwood	9.10 (64)	Alberton Oval		Port Adelaide	29
1960	16 July	12	Norwood	11.8 (74)	Port Adelaide	11.11 (77)	Norwood Oval		Port Adelaide	3
1960	24/9	PF	Norwood	8.11 (59)	Port Adelaide	3.14 (32)	Adelaide Oval	32,627	Norwood	27
1961	13 May	4	Norwood	6.10 (46)	Port Adelaide	12.15 (87)	Norwood Oval		Port Adelaide	41
1961	1 July	11	Port Adelaide	10.16 (76)	Norwood	11.13 (79)	Alberton Oval		Norwood	3
1961	19/8	17	Norwood	6.16 (52)	Port Adelaide	13.14 (92)	Kensington Oval		Port Adelaide	40
1961	23/9	PF	Port Adelaide	11.23 (89)	Norwood	13.13 (91)	Adelaide Oval	39,846	Norwood	2
1962	25 April	2	Norwood	15.14 (104)	Port Adelaide	11.16 (82)	Norwood Oval		Norwood	22
1962	9 June	9	Port Adelaide	18.15 (123)	Norwood	10.3 (63)	Alberton Oval		Port Adelaide	60
1962	1/9	19	Norwood	16.10 (106)	Port Adelaide	18.14 (122)	Kensington Oval		Port Adelaide	16
1963	13 April	1	Norwood	9.4 (58)	Port Adelaide	17.17 (119)	Adelaide Oval		Port Adelaide	61
1963	22 June	10	Port Adelaide	14.19 (103)	Norwood	7.4 (46)	Alberton Oval		Port Adelaide	57
1963	24/8	18	Norwood	4.8 (32)	Port Adelaide	8.14 (62)	Norwood Oval		Port Adelaide	30
1964	11 April	1	Norwood	15.19 (99)	Port Adelaide	13.19 (97)	Norwood Oval		Norwood	2
1964	18 July	13	Port Adelaide	5.12 (42)	Norwood	4.13 (37)	Alberton Oval		Port Adelaide	5
1965	8 May	4	Port Adelaide	13.12 (90)	Norwood	6.16 (52)	Alberton Oval	11,405	Port Adelaide	38
1965	31 July	15	Norwood	11.13 (79)	Port Adelaide	7.17 (59)	Norwood Oval	17,004	Norwood	20
1966	7 May	4	Port Adelaide	9.5 (59)	Norwood	10.9 (69)	Alberton Oval		Norwood	10
1966	9 July	12	Norwood	14.10 (94)	Port Adelaide	12.10 (82)	Norwood Oval		Norwood	12
1967	27 May	7	Norwood	13.15 (93)	Port Adelaide	14.10 (94)	Norwood Oval		Port Adelaide	1
1967	19/8	18	Port Adelaide	18.17 (125)	Norwood	10.7 (67)	Alberton Oval		Port Adelaide	58
1968	1 June	8	Port Adelaide	11.13 (79)	Norwood	7.8 (50)	Alberton Oval		Port Adelaide	29
1968	24/8	19	Norwood	5.5 (35)	Port Adelaide	7.13 (55)	Norwood Oval		Port Adelaide	20
1969	3 May	5	Port Adelaide	10.18 (78)	Norwood	9.14 (68)	Alberton Oval		Port Adelaide	10
1969	26 July	15	Norwood	11.18 (84)	Port Adelaide	9.12 (66)	Norwood Oval		Norwood	18
1970	4 April	1	Norwood	12.13 (85)	Port Adelaide	7.17 (59)	Norwood Oval		Norwood	26
1970	4 July	12	Port Adelaide	16.11 (107)	Norwood	14.3 (87)	Adelaide Oval		Port Adelaide	20
1970	29/8	20	Port Adelaide	9.11 (65)	Norwood	10.5 (65)	Alberton Oval		Draw	
1971	22 May	8	Norwood	9.13 (67)	Port Adelaide	14.21 (105)	Norwood Oval	20,280	Port Adelaide	38
1971	31 July	17	Port Adelaide	15.16 (106)	Norwood	10.10 (70)	Alberton Oval		Port Adelaide	36
1972	1 April	1	Norwood	19.16 (130)	Port Adelaide	16.12 (108)	Norwood Oval		Norwood	22
1972	3 June	10	Port Adelaide	7.20 (62)	Norwood	16.20 (116)	Alberton Oval		Norwood	54
1973	21 May	6	Norwood	19.18 (132)	Port Adelaide	8.16 (64)	Adelaide Oval		Norwood	68
1973	1/9	21	Norwood	11.13 (79)	Port Adelaide	6.8 (44)	Norwood Oval		Norwood	35
1973	8/9	EF	Port Adelaide	17.13 (115)	Norwood	23.13 (151)	Norwood Oval	17,734	Norwood	36
1974	6 April	1	Norwood	15.21 (111)	Port Adelaide	9.23 (77)	Norwood Oval		Norwood	34
1974	15 June	11	Port Adelaide	21.19 (145)	Norwood	11.11 (77)	Football Park		Port Adelaide	68
1974	7/9	QF	Port Adelaide	19.15 (129)	Norwood	15.13 (103)	Football Park	30,858	Port Adelaide	26
1975	7 June	9	Port Adelaide	17.13 (115)	Norwood	19.19 (133)	Football Park	20,054	Norwood	18
1975	30/8	18	Norwood	25.14 (164)	Port Adelaide	11.12 (78)	Norwood Oval	19,257	Norwood	86
1975	20/9	PF	Norwood	11.19 (85)	Port Adelaide	8.7 (55)	Football Park	36,128	Norwood	30
1976	19 April	3	Norwood	18.9 (117)	Port Adelaide	11.10 (76)	Football Park	20,321	Norwood	41
1976	3 July	13	Port Adelaide	12.10 (82)	Norwood	6.15 (51)	Football Park	16,747	Port Adelaide	31
1976	28/8	21	Port Adelaide	24.19 (163)	Norwood	12.17 (89)	Adelaide Oval	18,034	Port Adelaide	74
1977	11 April	2	Port Adelaide	9.13 (67)	Norwood	22.17 (149)	Football Park	23,126	Norwood	82
1977	11 June	11	Port Adelaide	9.17 (71)	Norwood	10.9 (69)	Alberton Oval	22,738	Port Adelaide	2
1977	6/8	19	Norwood	12.9 (81)	Port Adelaide	13.13 (91)	Norwood Oval	16,906	Port Adelaide	10
1978	1 April	1	Norwood	11.9 (75)	Port Adelaide	8.12 (60)	Football Park	19,733	Norwood	15
1978	10 June	11	Norwood	19.17 (131)	Port Adelaide	9.8 (62)	Norwood Oval	12,725	Norwood	69
1978	2/9	22	Port Adelaide	12.15 (87)	Norwood	6.10 (46)	Alberton Oval	10,936	Port Adelaide	41
1978	23/9	PF	Norwood	16.12 (108)	Port Adelaide	11.8 (74)	Football Park	39,000	Norwood	34
1979	7 April	1	Port Adelaide	12.17 (89)	Norwood	19.12 (126)	Alberton Oval	14,182	Norwood	37
1979	23 June	12	Norwood	21.14 (140)	Port Adelaide	16.11 (107)	Norwood Oval		Norwood	33
1979	27/8	21	Norwood	9.10 (64)	Port Adelaide	9.16 (70)	Football Park	17,268	Port Adelaide	6
1980	12 April	2	Port Adelaide	27.20 (182)	Norwood	11.8 (74)	Alberton Oval	13,352	Port Adelaide	108
1980	16 June	11	Port Adelaide	23.16 (154)	Norwood	9.10 (64)	Football Park	17,667	Port Adelaide	90
1980	23/8	20	Norwood	9.9 (63)	Port Adelaide	17.16 (118)	Norwood Oval	16,309	Port Adelaide	55
1980	4/10	GF	Port Adelaide	11.15 (81)	Norwood	9.9 (63)	Football Park	54,536	Port Adelaide	18
1981	25 April	4	Port Adelaide	15.8 (98)	Norwood	8.14 (62)	Football Park	17,900	Port Adelaide	36
1981	27 June	13	Norwood	8.10 (58)	Port Adelaide	8.11 (59)	Norwood Oval	12,442	Port Adelaide	1
1981	5/9	22	Port Adelaide	16.23 (119)	Norwood	12.1 (73)	Football Park	35,213	Port Adelaide	46
1982	10 April	2	Port Adelaide	12.6 (78)	Norwood	12.13 (85)	Football Park	21,171	Norwood	7
1982	14 June	11	Port Adelaide	11.12 (78)	Norwood	8.8 (56)	Alberton Oval	13,072	Port Adelaide	22
1982	28/8	21	Norwood	28.17 (185)	Port Adelaide	10.13 (73)	Norwood Oval	17,667	Norwood	112
1982	19/9	SF	Port Adelaide	14.17 (101)	Norwood	19.6 (120)	Football Park	37,276	Norwood	19
1983	9 April	2	Port Adelaide	15.11 (101)	Norwood	17.6 (108)	Alberton Oval	8,338	Norwood	7
1983	13 June	11	Port Adelaide	14.11 (95)	Norwood	14.9 (93)	Football Park	33,342	Port Adelaide	2
1983	21/8	20	Norwood	25.15 (165)	Port Adelaide	15.13 (103)	Football Park	18,109	Norwood	62
1984	4 May	6	Port Adelaide	20.14 (134)	Norwood	14.7 (91)	Football Park	19,512	Port Adelaide	43
1984	7 July	15	Norwood	19.7 (121)	Port Adelaide	13.11 (89)	Football Park	10,823	Norwood	32
1984	30/9	GF	Norwood	15.10 (100)	Port Adelaide	13.13 (91)	Football Park	50,271	Norwood	9
1985	25 April	4	Port Adelaide	19.13 (127)	Norwood	23.14 (152)	Football Park	31,797	Norwood	25
1985	6 July	13	Norwood	17.10 (112)	Port Adelaide	11.14 (80)	Norwood Oval	10,980	Norwood	32
1985	7/9	22	Port Adelaide	14.25 (109)	Norwood	20.14 (134)	Football Park	17,850	Norwood	25
1986	19 April	4	Port Adelaide	13.12 (90)	Norwood	21.13 (139)	Football Park	18,098	Norwood	80
1986	28 June	13	Norwood	22.21 (153)	Port Adelaide	13.9 (87)	Norwood Oval	11,701	Norwood	66
1986	6/9	22	Port Adelaide	18.10 (118)	Norwood	22.15 (147)	Alberton Oval	16,053	Norwood	29
1987	2 May	4	Port Adelaide	11.12 (78)	Norwood	13.6 (84)	Alberton Oval	9,183	Norwood	6
1987	5 July	13	Port Adelaide	13.12 (90)	Norwood	25.22 (172)	Football Park	24,323	Norwood	82
1987	5/9	22	Norwood	6.11 (47)	Port Adelaide	11.10 (76)	Football Park	18,793	Port Adelaide	29
1987	12/9	QF	Port Adelaide	8.16 (64)	Norwood	15.8 (98)	Football Park	27,750	Norwood	34
1988	30 April	4	Norwood	7.15 (57)	Port Adelaide	9.11 (65)	Norwood Oval	13,604	Port Adelaide	8
1988	2 July	13	Port Adelaide	18.9 (117)	Norwood	9.11 (65)	Football Park	17,785	Port Adelaide	52
1988	3/9	22	Port Adelaide	12.13 (85)	Norwood	8.8 (56)	Football Park	32,892	Port Adelaide	29
1988	17/9	SF	Port Adelaide	10.17 (77)	Norwood	2.5 (17)	Football Park	27,048	Port Adelaide	60
1989	8 May	4	Port Adelaide	10.12 (72)	Norwood	10.7 (67)	Football Park	14,029	Port Adelaide	5
1989	8 July	13	Port Adelaide	20.18 (138)	Norwood	10.4 (64)	Alberton Oval	9,968	Port Adelaide	74
1989	9/9	22	Norwood	18.19 (127)	Port Adelaide	9.13 (67)	Football Park	27,759	Norwood	60
1990	25 April	2	Port Adelaide	18.19 (127)	Norwood	12.9 (81)	Football Park	36,397	Port Adelaide	46
1990	1 July	11	Norwood	18.11 (119)	Port Adelaide	13.14 (92)	Football Park	21,093	Norwood	27
1990	8/9	20	Norwood	9.14 (68)	Port Adelaide	21.24 (150)	Football Park	22,217	Port Adelaide	82
1991	6 April	3	Norwood	16.11 (107)	Port Adelaide	12.20 (92)	Football Park		Norwood	15
1991	8 June	12	Norwood	10.15 (75)	Port Adelaide	14.12 (96)	Norwood Oval		Port Adelaide	21
1991	10/8	21	Port Adelaide	15.14 (104)	Norwood	13.10 (88)	Alberton Oval		Port Adelaide	16
1992	25 April	6	Norwood	11.19 (85)	Port Adelaide	15.17 (107)	Norwood Oval		Port Adelaide	22
1992	27 June	15	Port Adelaide	17.16 (118)	Norwood	17.9 (111)	Alberton Oval		Port Adelaide	7
1992	5/9	23	Port Adelaide	6.12 (48)	Norwood	14.7 (91)	Football Park		Norwood	43
1993	1 May	5	Port Adelaide	24.10 (154)	Norwood	16.15 (111)	Alberton Oval		Port Adelaide	43
1993	3 July	14	Norwood	21.18 (144)	Port Adelaide	10.9 (69)	Football Park		Norwood	75
1993	22/8	21	Norwood	19.19 (133)	Port Adelaide	16.15 (111)	Norwood Oval		Norwood	22
1993	26/9	PF	Port Adelaide	16.14 (110)	Norwood	20.17 (137)	Football Park		Norwood	27
1994	2 April	3	Port Adelaide	16.16 (112)	Norwood	6.16 (52)	Football Park		Port Adelaide	60
1994	5 June	12	Port Adelaide	11.5 (71)	Norwood	17.11 (113)	Alberton Oval		Norwood	42
1994	6/8	21	Norwood	13.14 (92)	Port Adelaide	16.13 (109)	Norwood Oval		Port Adelaide	17
1995	1 April	3	Port Adelaide	19.8 (122)	Norwood	9.10 (64)	Alberton Oval		Port Adelaide	58
1995	4 June	12	Norwood	23.21 (159)	Port Adelaide	10.7 (67)	Norwood Oval		Norwood	92
1995	5/8	21	Port Adelaide	12.10 (82)	Norwood	11.9 (75)	Football Park		Port Adelaide	7
1995	9/9	QF	Norwood	9.14 (68)	Port Adelaide	12.12 (84)	Football Park		Port Adelaide	16
1996	4 May	6	Port Adelaide	23.10 (148)	Norwood	8.12 (60)	Alberton Oval		Port Adelaide	88
1996	14 July	15	Norwood	21.11 (137)	Port Adelaide	9.9 (63)	Norwood Oval	16,600	Norwood	74
1996	15/9	QF	Port Adelaide	10.18 (78)	Norwood	9.11 (65)	Football Park	31,245	Port Adelaide	13
1996	29/9	PF	Port Adelaide	9.12 (66)	Norwood	9.8 (62)	Football Park	18,338	Port Adelaide	4

== Attendance records ==
=== Record attendances ===
Crowd	Year	Date	Rd	Home Team	Score	Away Team	Score	Ground	Winner	M
58,924	1957	28/9	GF	Norwood	13.16 (94)	Port Adelaide	15.15 (105)	Adelaide Oval	Port Adelaide	3
54,536	1980	4/10	GF	Port Adelaide	11.15 (81)	Norwood	9.9 (63)	Football Park	Port Adelaide	18
53,473	1946	5/10	GF	Norwood	13.14 (92)	Port Adelaide	9.10 (64)	Adelaide Oval	Norwood	28
50,271	1984	30/9	GF	Norwood	15.10 (100)	Port Adelaide	13.13 (91)	Football Park	Norwood	9
44,826	1955	1/10	GF	Port Adelaide	15.11 (101)	Norwood	5.8 (38)	Adelaide Oval	Port Adelaide	63

=== Record minor round attendances ===
Crowd	Year	Date	Rd	Home Team	Score	Away Team	Score	Ground	Winner	M
36,397	1990		2	Port Adelaide		Norwood		Football Park	Port Adelaide	
35,213	1981		22	Port Adelaide		Norwood		Football Park	Port Adelaide	
33,892	1988		22	Port Adelaide		Norwood		Football Park	Port Adelaide	
33,342	1983		11	Port Adelaide		Norwood				
31,797	1985		4	Port Adelaide		Norwood				
