= 1927 SANFL season =

48th season of SANFL; first under its current name

- Teams: 8
- Premiers: West Adelaide; 5th premiership
- Minor premiers: West Adelaide; 1st minor premiership
- Magarey Medallist: Bruce McGregor; West Adelaide
- Ken Farmer Medallist: Jack Owens; Glenelg (80 goals)
- Matches played: 72
- Highest: 35,244 (First Semi-Final, North Adelaide vs. West Torrens)

The 1927 South Australian National Football League season was the 48th season of the top-level Australian rules football competition in South Australia. During the 1926–27 off-season, the league made a number of changes, including changing the competition's name from the "South Australian Football League" to its current "South Australian National Football League" moniker, and expanding the minor round from fourteen games to seventeen.

The season was highlighted by the rise of West Adelaide, who, helped by the acquisition of the Wayville Showgrounds as a permanent home venue and of several major recruits from the "B" grade (Note: Now known as the "Reserves") including Bennetts and Schoff, the Bloods rose from having played in the major round just once since the league resumed after World War I to win fourteen of its seventeen minor round matches and claim the premiership after two strenuous struggles with North Adelaide. With their attack weakened by an off-season injury to star forward Bent, who would only play a few games without showing a trace of his previous form, Norwood missed the major round for the first time since 1919, whilst reigning premiers Sturt, obviously aged, would stay in touch but be thrashed by Port Adelaide and also miss out.

== Minor Round ==
=== Round 1 ===
	Round 1
Saturday, 30 April 1927	South Adelaide 6.10 (46)	def. by	Port Adelaide 14.15 (99)	Adelaide Oval (crowd: 16,000)
Saturday, 30 April 1927	Norwood 16.20 (116)	def.	Glenelg 9.11 (65)	Norwood Oval (crowd: 11,000)
Saturday, 30 April 1927	North Adelaide 15.16 (106)	def.	West Torrens 8.9 (57)	Prospect Oval (crowd: 11,823)
Saturday, 30 April 1927	West Adelaide 10.11 (71)	def.	Sturt 10.9 (69)	Wayville Showgrounds

=== Round 2 ===
	Round 2
Saturday, 7 May 1927	Port Adelaide 8.13 (61)	def.	North Adelaide 8.10 (58)	Adelaide Oval (crowd: 15,000)
Saturday, 7 May 1927	West Adelaide 17.11 (113)	def.	Norwood 10.11 (71)	Wayville Showgrounds (crowd: 8,560)
Saturday, 7 May 1927	West Torrens 9.11 (65)	def.	Glenelg 8.12 (60)	Thebarton Oval (crowd: 5,263)
Saturday, 7 May 1927	Sturt 13.12 (90)	def.	South Adelaide 7.11 (53)	Unley Oval (crowd: 4,750)

=== Round 3 ===
	Round 3
Saturday, 14 May 1927	South Adelaide 12.11 (83)	def. by	Glenelg 18.8 (116)	Adelaide Oval (crowd: 4,200)
Saturday, 14 May 1927	Norwood 13.7 (85)	def.	North Adelaide 11.18 (84)	Norwood Oval (crowd: 9,800)
Saturday, 14 May 1927	West Torrens 7.11 (53)	def.	West Adelaide 6.11 (47)	Thebarton Oval (crowd: 8,217)
Saturday, 14 May 1927	Sturt 10.19 (79)	def. by	Port Adelaide 14.6 (90)	Unley Oval (crowd: 10,500)
Norwood's extreme accuracy – they kicked 11 goals from 13 shots up to three-quarter time – allows them to snatch a game where North dominated general play.

=== Round 4 ===
	Round 4
Saturday, 21 May 1927	West Adelaide 10.12 (72)	def.	North Adelaide 8.10 (58)	Adelaide Oval (crowd: 15,000)
Saturday, 21 May 1927	Port Adelaide 6.18 (54)	def.	West Torrens 5.14 (44)	Alberton Oval (crowd: 15,000)
Saturday, 21 May 1927	Glenelg 13.12 (90)	def. by	Sturt 12.19 (91)	Glenelg Oval (crowd: 6,000)
Saturday, 21 May 1927	Norwood 10.9 (69)	def. by	South Adelaide 12.14 (86)	Norwood Oval (crowd: 5,800)
South Adelaide recorded its first win in nineteen matches since 22 August 1925, with "Bulla" Ryan's seven goals – making his total from two matches fifteen – decisive against a Norwood side lacking Bent.

=== Round 5 ===
	Round 5
Saturday, 28 May 1927	West Torrens 12.11 (83)	def.	Sturt 6.6 (42)	Adelaide Oval (crowd: 14,000)
Saturday, 28 May 1927	Port Adelaide 16.14 (110)	def.	Norwood 10.9 (69)	Alberton Oval (crowd: 10,500)
Saturday, 28 May 1927	Glenelg 8.13 (61)	def. by	North Adelaide 20.9 (129)	Glenelg Oval (crowd: 4,000)
Saturday, 28 May 1927	West Adelaide 17.18 (120)	def.	South Adelaide 7.13 (55)	Wayville Showgrounds (crowd: 3,000)

=== Round 6 (King's Birthday) ===
	Round 6
Saturday, 4 June 1927	Glenelg 8.11 (59)	def. by	West Torrens 13.13 (91)	Adelaide Oval (crowd: 11,000)
Saturday, 4 June 1927	North Adelaide 11.12 (78)	def.	South Adelaide 6.5 (41)	Prospect Oval (crowd: 4,200)
Monday, 6 June 1927	Sturt 13.13 (91)	def.	Norwood 11.4 (70)	Adelaide Oval (crowd: 18,500)
Monday, 6 June 1927	Port Adelaide 12.14 (86)	def.	West Adelaide 10.14 (74)	Alberton Oval (crowd: 17,500)

=== Round 7 ===
	Round 7
Saturday, 11 June 1927	South Adelaide 5.7 (37)	def. by	Port Adelaide 20.24 (144)	Adelaide Oval (crowd: 7,500)
Saturday, 11 June 1927	Norwood 5.12 (42)	def. by	West Torrens 6.16 (52)	Norwood Oval (crowd: 10,800)
Saturday, 11 June 1927	North Adelaide 12.12 (84)	def.	Sturt 8.2 (50)	Prospect Oval (crowd: 7,500)
Saturday, 11 June 1927	West Adelaide 13.15 (93)	def.	Glenelg 12.6 (78)	Wayville Showgrounds (crowd: 3,400)
South Adelaide suffered its worst loss to that point, beating 78 points against West Adelaide from 1922.

=== Round 8 ===
	Round 8
Saturday, 18 June 1927	Norwood 14.16 (100)	def. by	Glenelg 19.4 (118)	Adelaide Oval (crowd: 9,100)
Saturday, 18 June 1927	North Adelaide 14.10 (94)	def.	Port Adelaide 7.10 (52)	Prospect Oval (crowd: 13,038)
Saturday, 18 June 1927	West Adelaide 21.18 (144)	def.	South Adelaide 9.10 (64)	Wayville Showgrounds (crowd: 3,000)
Saturday, 18 June 1927	West Torrens 8.13 (61)	def. by	Sturt 8.14 (62)	Thebarton Oval (crowd: 9,010)
North Adelaide surprise the unbeaten Magpies with an easy victory and move to third ahead of West Torrens and reigning premiers Sturt, whilst Owens' eleven goals sends Norwood to a fifth consecutive defeat.

=== Round 9 ===
	Round 9
Saturday, 25 June 1927	South Adelaide 10.14 (74)	def. by	West Torrens 11.9 (75)	Adelaide Oval (crowd: 5,200)
Saturday, 25 June 1927	Glenelg 8.12 (60)	def. by	Port Adelaide 9.9 (63)	Glenelg Oval (crowd: 7,000)
Saturday, 25 June 1927	West Adelaide 12.8 (80)	def.	North Adelaide 10.12 (72)	Wayville Showgrounds (crowd: 11,250)
Saturday, 25 June 1927	Sturt 11.9 (75)	def.	Norwood 8.11 (59)	Unley Oval (crowd: 9,300)
Lowly South just fail to beat Torrens after taking the lead for the first time late in the last quarter only to see McCarthy kick 1.2 (8) for victory.

=== Round 10 ===
	Round 10
Saturday, 2 July 1927	South Adelaide 7.14 (56)	def. by	North Adelaide 14.16 (100)	Adelaide Oval (crowd: 7,000)
Saturday, 2 July 1927	Glenelg 8.13 (61)	def. by	Sturt 9.11 (65)	Glenelg Oval (crowd: 7,500)
Saturday, 2 July 1927	Norwood 13.7 (85)	def. by	West Adelaide 17.9 (111)	Norwood Oval (crowd: 8,400)
Saturday, 2 July 1927	West Torrens 9.12 (66)	def.	Port Adelaide 9.11 (65)	Thebarton Oval (crowd: 15,148)
Following the hectic finish at Thebarton, umpire Quinn was struck by a spectator on the face, although neither he not the police who escorted the spectator saw how delivered the blow.; The Thebarton game also saw three players – two Port Adelaide and one West Torrens – disqualified during the week for fighting, and league commissioner O'Halloran said that the fighting had to stop.; At Glenelg, Frank Golding becomes the first player to play 200 SAFL/SANFL games.

=== Round 11 ===
	Round 11
Saturday, 9 July 1927	South Adelaide 8.15 (63)	def. by	Sturt 8.22 (70)	Adelaide Oval (crowd: 6,000)
Saturday, 9 July 1927	Glenelg 11.8 (74)	def. by	West Torrens 15.11 (101)	Glenelg Oval (crowd: 6,500)
Saturday, 9 July 1927	North Adelaide 14.13 (97)	def.	Norwood 12.10 (82)	Prospect Oval (crowd: 7,000)
Saturday, 9 July 1927	West Adelaide 16.8 (104)	def.	Port Adelaide 5.8 (38)	Wayville Showgrounds (crowd: 15,800)
A brilliant win minus injured captain-coach McGregor by West Adelaide displaces Port Adelaide from the top and establishes the Bloods as frontrunners for the premiership a game plus percentage clear on top of the ladder.

=== Round 12 ===
	Round 12
Saturday, 16 July 1927	South Adelaide 11.11 (77)	def. by	Norwood 13.6 (84)	Adelaide Oval (crowd: 6,200)
Saturday, 16 July 1927	Port Adelaide 4.19 (43)	def. by	Glenelg 6.9 (45)	Alberton Oval (crowd: 8,200)
Saturday, 16 July 1927	North Adelaide 10.11 (71)	def.	West Adelaide 9.4 (58)	Prospect Oval (crowd: 12,406)
Saturday, 16 July 1927	Sturt 11.5 (71)	def. by	West Torrens 10.14 (74)	Unley Oval (crowd: 11,500)
Glenelg beats Port for the first time, as the Magpies' woeful forward play in the absence of Dayman prevents them capitalising upon having eight more scoring shots.

=== Round 13 ===
	Round 13
Saturday, 23 July 1927	Port Adelaide 16.12 (108)	def.	South Adelaide 7.8 (50)	Alberton Oval (crowd: 6,400)
Saturday, 23 July 1927	Glenelg 11.9 (75)	def. by	Norwood 11.14 (80)	Glenelg Oval (crowd: 4,000)
Saturday, 23 July 1927	West Adelaide 18.10 (118)	def.	West Torrens 16.7 (103)	Wayville Showgrounds (crowd: 14,950)
Saturday, 23 July 1927	Sturt 11.5 (71)	def.	North Adelaide 4.15 (39)	Unley Oval (crowd: 9,000)

=== Round 14 ===
	Round 14
Saturday, 30 July 1927	Norwood 12.9 (81)	def.	West Torrens 7.19 (61)	Adelaide Oval (crowd: 14,700)
Saturday, 30 July 1927	Port Adelaide 6.15 (51)	def. by	North Adelaide 12.7 (79)	Alberton Oval
Saturday, 30 July 1927	Glenelg 9.19 (73)	def.	South Adelaide 7.13 (55)	Glenelg Oval
Saturday, 30 July 1927	Sturt 7.8 (50)	def. by	West Adelaide 12.15 (87)	Unley Oval

=== Round 15 ===
	Round 15
Saturday, 6 August 1927	Port Adelaide 9.10 (64)	def. by	West Adelaide 11.7 (73)	Adelaide Oval (crowd: 13,700)
Saturday, 6 August 1927	Norwood 6.14 (50)	def. by	Sturt 8.10 (58)	Norwood Oval (crowd: 9,300)
Saturday, 6 August 1927	North Adelaide 13.16 (94)	def.	Glenelg 5.11 (41)	Prospect Oval (crowd: 5,100)
Saturday, 6 August 1927	West Torrens 13.16 (94)	def. by	South Adelaide 15.9 (99)	Thebarton Oval (crowd: 4,730)
Port Adelaide, after playing poorly during July, improve greatly against the pacesetters but their forwards still are not effective enough to win.; West Torrens, a few weeks ago candidates for the minor premiership, are in danger of losing their place in the four after being narrowly beaten by an accurate South Adelaide, who win only their sixth game in three seasons.

=== Round 16 ===
	Round 16
Saturday, 27 August 1927	South Adelaide 12.8 (80)	def. by	West Adelaide 16.18 (114)	Adelaide Oval (crowd: 4,000)
Saturday, 27 August 1927	Norwood 12.10 (82)	def.	Port Adelaide 10.14 (74)	Norwood Oval (crowd: 7,200)
Saturday, 27 August 1927	West Torrens 9.10 (64)	def.	North Adelaide 7.13 (55)	Thebarton Oval (crowd: 8,030)
Saturday, 27 August 1927	Sturt 11.16 (82)	def.	Glenelg 9.9 (63)	Unley Oval (crowd: 4,300)
Early-season pacesetters Port Adelaide, handicapped by a further injury to Dayman in his comeback match, lose their place in the four after failing again against a revitalised Norwood.

=== Round 17 ===
	Round 17
Saturday, 3 September 1927	South Adelaide 8.10 (58)	def. by	North Adelaide 15.9 (99)	Adelaide Oval (crowd: 5,000)
Saturday, 3 September 1927	Port Adelaide 11.21 (87)	def.	Sturt 5.6 (36)	Alberton Oval (crowd: 12,200)
Saturday, 3 September 1927	Glenelg 10.11 (71)	def. by	West Adelaide 12.9 (81)	Glenelg Oval (crowd: 2,500)
Saturday, 3 September 1927	West Torrens 10.7 (67)	def. by	Norwood 12.12 (84)	Thebarton Oval (crowd: 7,900)
With "Shine" Hosking making a comeback as a player after six years and justifying the move, Port rebound to crush Sturt and displace the reigning premiers from the finals.

== Ladder ==
1927 SANFL Ladder
Pos	Team	Pld	W	L	D	PF	PA	PP	Pts
1	West Adelaide (P)	17	14	3	0	1560	1168	57.18	28
2	North Adelaide	17	11	6	0	1397	1040	57.32	22
3	Port Adelaide	17	10	7	0	1289	1096	54.05	20
4	West Torrens	17	10	7	0	1211	1193	50.37	20
5	Sturt	17	10	7	0	1152	1185	49.29	20
6	Norwood	17	7	10	0	1309	1414	48.07	14
7	Glenelg	17	4	13	0	1210	1432	45.80	8
8	South Adelaide	17	2	15	0	1077	1677	39.11	4

Rules for classification: 1) points; 2) percentage; 3) number of points for.
(P) Premiers

== Major Round ==
=== First Semi-Final ===
1927 SANFL First Semi-Final
Saturday, 10 September 1927	North Adelaide	def.	West Torrens	Adelaide Oval (crowd: 35,244)
1.2 (8); 2.3 (15); 5.6 (36); 10.9 (69)	Q1; Q2; Q3; Final	2.3 (15); 2.5 (17); 3.9 (27); 4.13 (37)	Umpires: Quinn
Furler 3, McDowall 2, Fleet 2, Taylor, Moon, Ween	Goals	Dempster, McCarthy, Lampe, Karney
Hawke, Williams, Boyle, McDowall, Ramsay, Ween, Conrad	Best	Fleet, Ashby, Adams, Geue, Bostian, Ward, Phillips, Karney
Fleet for striking Daviess; Fleet for hacking (Note: Archaic term for kicking a player) at Lampe	Reports	Daviess for striking Fleet; Daviess for elbowing Moyle; Lampe for attempting to strike Morris
North overwhelm the Torrens forward line in a rough game with five reports including one for attempting to hack a player. Daviess would be suspended for four matches and Fleet for three.

=== Second Semi-Final ===
1927 SANFL Second Semi-Final
Saturday, 17 September 1927	West Adelaide	def.	Port Adelaide	Adelaide Oval (crowd: 34,000)
3.3 (21); 7.4 (46); 11.10 (76); 16.11 (107)	Q1; Q2; Q3; Final	1.5 (11); 2.7 (19); 5.7 (37); 8.9 (57)	Umpires: Quinn
Bennetts 5, McGregor 5, Bishop, Jarvis, Batt, Payne, Soloman, Snell	Goals	Conole 2, Logan 2, J. Wade 2, Galliford, Fitzgerald
McGregor, Schiff, Bishop, Snell, Shugg, Bennett, Jarvis, Bennetts	Best	Johnson, Keal, Mott, Bampton, J. Wade, Hodge, Allingham, Hosking

=== Final ===
1927 SANFL Final
Saturday, 24 September 1927	West Adelaide	def. by	North Adelaide	Adelaide Oval (crowd: 34,274)
2.5 (17); 2.8 (20); 4.11 (35); 6.11 (47)	Q1; Q2; Q3; Final	0.0 (0); 5.0 (30); 7.2 (44); 8.3 (51)	Umpires: Quinn
Bennetts 2, Stokes, Payne, McGregor, Soloman	Goals	Townley 2, Taylor 2, Hawke, Ween, Furler, McDowall
McGregor, Scanlon, Schiff, Bishop, Lee, Snell, Ryder	Best	Lewis, Furler, Ween, Conrad, McDowall, Ramsay, Morris
After appearing beaten, West just fail to win the game against a strong and tricky wind in the final quarter. With his only goal, McGregor becomes the first West Adelaide player to kick 50 goals in a season, although Bennetts would surpass him by one the following Saturday.

=== Grand Final ===
1927 SANFL Grand Final
Saturday, 1 October	West Adelaide	def.	North Adelaide	Adelaide Oval (crowd: 33,222)
2.1 (13); 5.4 (34); 8.7 (55); 10.11 (71) (Note: The originally listed score was 10.10 (70) but a review would add a further behind to the Bloods' score)	Q1; Q2; Q3; Final	3.6 (24); 5.8 (38); 7.8 (50); 9.10 (64) (Note: The originally listed score was 8.10 (58) but a review would add a further goal to North Adelaide's score)	Umpires: Quinn
Bennetts 4, Bishop 2, Payne 2, Hale, Whitford	Goals	Furler 4, Ween 2, Hyde, McDowall
Snell, Bishop, Schiff, Lee, Soloman, Scanlon, Bennetts	Best	Ween, Ramsay, Boyle, McDonald, Moon, Furler, Hawke, Lewis
