= Ken Farmer Medal =

Medal in Australian rules football

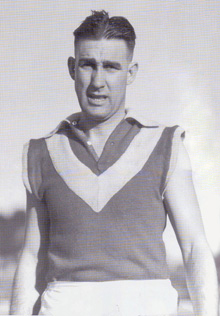
Ken Farmer, the namesake of the award, was the leading goalkicker for a record 11 successive seasons kicking over 100 goals in each of those seasons

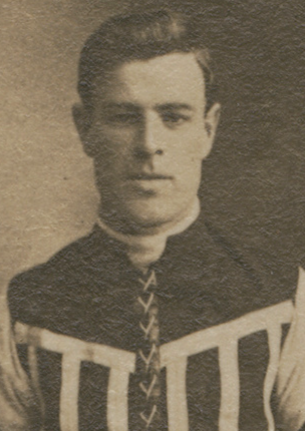
Frank Hansen won the award four times in a row.

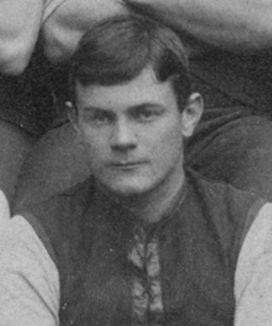
Anthony Daly remains the only player to have won the award at four separate clubs.

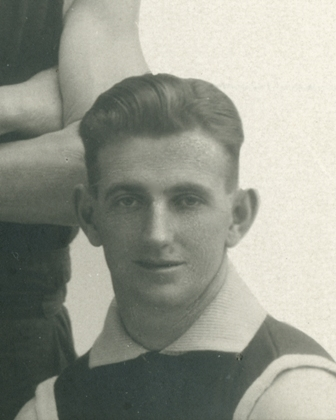
Roy Bent was a four-time Ken Farmer Medallist.

The Ken Farmer Medal is named in honour of the Australian rules football full-forward Ken Farmer, who played for North Adelaide Football Club for his entire 13-season career, being North Adelaide's leading goalkicker all 13 seasons he played and leading the league overall for 11 of those seasons, four more than any other player in the league's history. The medal is awarded to the South Australian Football League's (SANFL) top goalkicker at the end of the home-and-away matches each season and was instigated in 1981.

== Ken Farmer Medallists ==
=== List of winners ===
Year	Medallist	Club	Goals
1877	John Young (1)	Adelaide I (1877-1881) (1)	14
1878	William Dedman (1)	Norwood (1)	12
1879	William Dedman (2)	Norwood (2)	12
1880	Joe Traynor (1)	Norwood (3)	7
1881	Joe Pollock (1)	Norwood (4)	7
1881	W J Duffy (1)	Norwood (5)	7
1882	H J Wardrop (1)	South Adelaide (1)	14
1883	J E Litchfield (1)	Port Adelaide (1)	13
1884	R C Roy (1)	Port Adelaide (2)	22
1885	H R Hill (1)	South Adelaide (2)	19
1886	Richard Stephens (1)	Adelaide II (1885-1893) (2)	17
1887	Alf Bushby (1)	Port Adelaide (3)	25
1888	Charles Woods (1)	Norwood (6)	29
1889	Charlie Fry (1)	Port Adelaide (4)	32
1890	J McKenzie (1)	Port Adelaide (5)	32
1891	Charles Woods (2)	Norwood (7)	55
1892	Charles Woods (3)	Norwood (8)	46
1893	Anthony Daly (1)	Norwood (9)	88
1894	Anthony Daly (2)	Norwood (10)	47
1895	Anthony Daly (3)	Norwood (11)	46
1896	Jack Kay (1)	South Adelaide (3)	25
1897	Jimmy Tompkins (1)	Port Adelaide (6)	27
1898	Jack Kay (2)	South Adelaide (4)	35
1899	Anthony Daly (4)	South Adelaide (5)	32
1900	Anthony Daly (5)	West Torrens (1)	27
1901	William Miller (1)	Norwood (12)	44
1902	Jack Kay (3)	South Adelaide (6)	28
1903	Anthony Daly (6)	North Adelaide (1)	54
1904	William Miller (2)	Norwood (13)	35
1905	John Mathison (1)	Port Adelaide (7)	30
1905	Anthony Daly (7)	North Adelaide (2)	30
1906	John Mathison (2)	Port Adelaide (8)	42
1907	John Quinn (1)	Port Adelaide (9)	32
1908	John Mathison (3)	Port Adelaide (10)	33
1909	Richard Townsend (1)	Norwood (14)	22
1910	Frank Hansen (1)	Port Adelaide (11)	46
1911	Frank Hansen (2)	Port Adelaide (12)	41
1912	Frank Hansen (3)	Port Adelaide (13)	37
1913	Frank Hansen (4)	Port Adelaide (14)	39
1914	John Dunn (1)	Port Adelaide (15)	33
1915	Francis Fitzgerald (1)	West Adelaide (1)	31
1916–1918 Suspended during World War 1
1919	Len Lackman (1)	Port Adelaide (16)	26
1920	Frank Golding (1)	Sturt (1)	30
1921	Roy Bent (1)	Norwood (15)	42
1922	Tom Hart (1)	Norwood (16)	50
1923	Percy Lewis (1)	North Adelaide (3)	58
1924	Roy Bent (2)	Norwood (17)	53
1925	Roy Bent (3)	Norwood (18)	59
1926	Roy Bent (4)	Norwood (19)	65
1927	Jack Owens (1)	Glenelg (1)	80
1928	Jack Owens (2)	Glenelg (2)	83
1929	Les Dayman (1)	Port Adelaide (17)	86
1930	Ken Farmer (1)	North Adelaide (4)	105
1931	Ken Farmer (2)	North Adelaide (5)	126
1932	Ken Farmer (3)	North Adelaide (6)	102
1932	Jack Owens (3)	Glenelg (4)	102
1933	Ken Farmer (4)	North Adelaide (7)	112
1934	Ken Farmer (5)	North Adelaide (8)	106
1935	Ken Farmer (6)	North Adelaide (9)	128
1936	Ken Farmer (7)	North Adelaide (10)	134
1937	Ken Farmer (8)	North Adelaide (11)	108
1938	Ken Farmer (9)	North Adelaide (12)	112
1939	Ken Farmer (10)	North Adelaide (13)	113
1940	Ken Farmer (11)	North Adelaide (14)	125
1941	Bruce Schultz (1)	Norwood (20)	100
Competition reduced to aligned teams during WWII
1942	Ross Reynolds (1)	Sturt (2); South Adelaide (7)	45
1943	William Isaac (1)	Norwood (21); North Adelaide (15)	73
1944	William Isaac (2)	Norwood (22); North Adelaide (16)	76
Competition returns to un-aligned teams.
1945	Stanley Scott (1)	South Adelaide (8)	64
1946	Peter Dalwood (1)	Norwood (23)	70
1947	Bob McLean (1)	Port Adelaide (18)	80
1948	Colin Churchett (1)	Glenelg (5)	88
1949	Colin Churchett (2)	Glenelg (6)	72
1950	Colin Churchett (3)	Glenelg (7)	105
1951	Colin Churchett (4)	Glenelg (8)	102
1952	John Willis (1)	West Torrens (2)	85
1953	Max Mayo (1)	Norwood (24)	78
1954	William McKenzie (1)	North Adelaide (17)	67
1955	Paul Caust (1)	Sturt (3)	57
1956	Rex Johns (1)	Port Adelaide (19)	70
1957	Peter Phipps (1)	West Adelaide (2)	90
1958	Rex Johns (2)	Port Adelaide (20)	55
1959	Wally Dittmar (1)	Port Adelaide (21)	74
1960	Wally Dittmar (2)	Port Adelaide (22)	69
1961	Geoff Kingston (1)	West Torrens (3)	79
1962	Rex Johns (3)	Port Adelaide (23)	76
1963	Rex Johns (4)	Port Adelaide (24)	54
1964	Ross Sawley (1)	Sturt (4)	70
1965	Ian Brewer (1)	Norwood (25)	96
1966	Eric Freeman (1)	Port Adelaide (25)	81
1967	Dennis Sachse (1)	North Adelaide (18)	90
1968	Rick Vidovich (1)	Central District (1)	62
1969	Fred Phillis (1)	Glenelg (9)	137
1970	Fred Phillis (2)	Glenelg (10)	107
1971	Fred Phillis (3)	Glenelg (11)	99
1972	Michael Coligan (1)	Norwood (26)	81
1973	Ken Whelan (1)	Sturt (5)	107
1974	Ken Whelan (2)	Sturt (6)	108
1975	Fred Phillis (4)	Glenelg (12)	108
1976	Fred Phillis (5)	Glenelg (13)	98
1977	Tim Evans (1)	Port Adelaide (26)	87
1978	Tim Evans (2)	Port Adelaide (27)	90
1979	Glynn Hewitt (1)	Woodville (1)	83
1980	Tim Evans (3)	Port Adelaide (28)	146
Award named the Ken Farmer Medal
1981	Tim Evans (4)	Port Adelaide (29)	98
1982	Tim Evans (5)	Port Adelaide (30)	125
1983	Rick Davies (1)	Sturt (7)	151
1984	Tim Evans (6)	Port Adelaide (31)	127
1985	Malcolm Blight (1)	Woodville (2)	126
1986	Stephen Nichols (1)	Woodville (3)	103
1987	John Roberts (1)	North Adelaide (19)	111
1988	Stephen Nichols (2)	Woodville (4)	103
1989	Rudi Mandemaker (1)	Central District (2)	93
1990	Scott Hodges (1)	Port Adelaide (32)	153
1991	Scott Morphett (1)	Woodville-West Torrens (1)	99
1992	Mark Tylor (1)	Port Adelaide (33)	97
1993	Mark Tylor (2)	Port Adelaide (34)	87
1994	Scott Hodges (2)	Port Adelaide (35)	114
1995	Danny Del-Re (1)	South Adelaide (9)	92
1996	Scott Hodges (3)	Port Adelaide (36)	102
1997	Jim West (4)	Norwood (27)	73
1998	Adam Richardson (1)	West Adelaide (3)	100
1999	Adam Richardson (2)	West Adelaide (4)	66
2000	Adam Richardson (3)	West Adelaide (5)	72
2001	Adam Richardson (4)	West Adelaide (6)	81
2002	Daniel Hargraves (1)	North Adelaide (20)	68
2003	Darren Bradshaw (1)	West Adelaide (7)	88
2004	Daniel Schell (1)	Central District (3)	63
2005	Daniel Schell (2)	Central District (4)	67
2006	Mark Passador (1)	Woodville-West Torrens (2)	79
2007	Brant Chambers (1)	Sturt (8)	106
2008	Brant Chambers (2)	Sturt (9)	97
2009	Brant Chambers (3)	Sturt (10)	80
2010	Todd Grima (1)	Glenelg (14)	58
2011	Michael Wundke (1)	South Adelaide (10)	67
2012	Justin Hardy (1)	Central District (5)	58
2013	Michael Wundke (2)	South Adelaide (11)	52
2014	Michael Wundke (3)	Woodville-West Torrens (3)	63
2015	Clint Alleway (1)	Glenelg (15)	47
2016	Brett Eddy (1)	South Adelaide (12)	68
2017	Brett Eddy (2)	Port Adelaide (37)	53
2018	Mark Evans (1)	Sturt (11)	40
2019	Liam McBean (1)	Glenelg (16)	46
2020	Liam McBean (2)	Glenelg (17)	38
2020	James Rowe (1)	Woodville-West Torrens (4)	38
2021	Liam McBean (3)	Glenelg (18)	49
2022	Daniel Menzel (1)	Woodville-West Torrens (5)	51
2023	Lachie Hosie (1)	Glenelg (19)	52
2024	Mitch Harvey (1)	North Adelaide (21)	45
2025	Lachie Hosie (2)	Glenelg (20)	65
2026	Lachie Hosie (3)	Glenelg (21)	62

== Award records ==
=== Multiple recipients ===
Table of multiple recipients
Player	Wins	Club(s)	Years
Ken Farmer	11	North Adelaide	1930, 1931, 1932, 1933, 1934, 1935, 1936, 1937, 1938, 1939, 1940
Anthony Daly	7	Norwood; South Adelaide; West Torrens; North Adelaide	1893, 1894, 1895, 1899, 1900, 1903, 1905
Tim Evans	6	Port Adelaide	1977, 1978, 1980, 1981, 1982, 1984
Fred Phillis	5	Glenelg	1969, 1970, 1971, 1975, 1976
Roy Bent	4	Norwood	1921, 1924, 1925, 1926
Colin Churchett	4	Glenelg	1948, 1949, 1950, 1951
Frank Hansen	4	Port Adelaide	1910, 1911, 1912, 1913
Rex Johns	4	Port Adelaide	1956, 1958, 1962, 1963
Adam Richardson	4	West Adelaide	1998, 1999, 2000, 2001
Brant Chambers	3	Sturt	2007, 2008, 2009
Scott Hodges	3	Port Adelaide	1990, 1994, 1996
Jack Kay	3	South Adelaide	1896, 1898, 1902
John Mathison	3	Port Adelaide	1905, 1906, 1908
Liam McBean	3	Glenelg	2019, 2020, 2021
Jack Owens	3	Glenelg	1927, 1928, 1932
Charlie Woods	3	Norwood	1888, 1891, 1892
Michael Wundke	3	South Adelaide; Woodville-West Torrens	2011, 2013, 2014
Lachlan Hosie	3	Glenelg	2023, 2025, 2026
Billy Dedman	2	Norwood	1878, 1879
Wally Dittmar	2	Port Adelaide	1959, 1960
Brett Eddy	2	South Adelaide; Port Adelaide	2016, 2017
William Isaac	2	Norwood; North Adelaide	1943, 1944
William Miller	2	Norwood	1901, 1904
Stephen Nichols	2	Woodville	1986, 1988
Daniel Schell	2	Central District	2004, 2005
Mark Tylor	2	Port Adelaide	1992, 1993
Ken Whelan	2	Sturt	1973, 1974

=== Club totals ===
Club	Ken Farmer Medallists
Port Adelaide	37
Norwood	27
North Adelaide	21
Glenelg	21
South Adelaide	12
Sturt	11
West Adelaide	7
Central District	5
Woodville-West Torrens	5
Woodville	4
West Torrens	3
Adelaide I (1877-1881)	1
Adelaide II (1885-1893)	1
Adelaide (AFL Reserves)	0
