= 1926 SAFL season =

1926 season of SANFL; last before adopting its current name

1926 SAFL premiership season
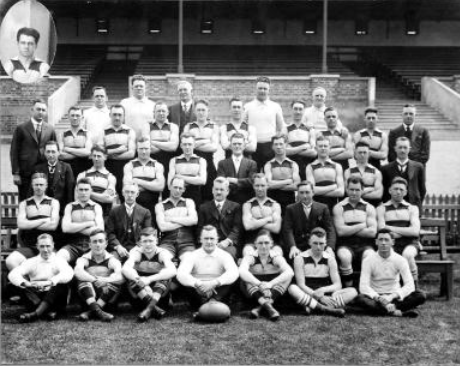
- 46th SAFL season Pictured above is the 1926 SAFL premiership team Sturt.
- Teams: 8
- Premiers: Sturt; 3rd premiership
- Minor premiers: Sturt; 3rd minor premiership
- Magarey Medallist: Bruce McGregor; West Adelaide
- Leading goalkicker: Roy Bent; Norwood (65 goals)
- Matches played: 60
- Highest: 40,000 (Final, Norwood vs. North Adelaide)

The 1926 South Australian Football League season was the 47th season of the top-level Australian rules football competition in South Australia, and the last as the "South Australian Football League" before it adopted its current "National" moniker.

On the field, Glenelg avoided the wooden spoon for the first time in its six-season history, largely thanks to the prolific goalkicking of Jack Owens, who became the highest goalkicker for a season since "Bos" Daly kicked 88 in 1893, although Norwood's Roy Bent would surpass him in the finals. Minus the retired Moriarty and fielding a side of two-thirds new men, South Adelaide fell to their second winless season, whereas Sturt, in a fitting finale for veteran star Golding, took its third premiership to end Norwood's dominance of the previous four seasons.

Following on from the VFL the previous season, the SAFL awarded a free kick for sending the ball out of bounds, (Note: Unlike the "out of bounds on the full" rule introduced in the VFL in 1969, the rule introduced in the VFL in 1925 and SAFL in 1926 applied even if the ball bounced over the line and the ball was sent out accidentally.) and although the change was feared as ruining the game, it was generally agreed that it improved play by reducing the value of brawny ruckmen.

== Minor Round ==
=== Round 1 ===
	Round 1
Saturday, 1 May 1926	West Adelaide 12.9 (81)	def.	Port Adelaide 5.7 (37)	Adelaide Oval (crowd: 10,000)
Saturday, 1 May 1926	North Adelaide 8.12 (60)	def.	South Adelaide 7.14 (56)	Prospect Oval (crowd: 2,800)
Saturday, 1 May 1926	West Torrens 10.21 (81)	def.	Glenelg 2.10 (22)	Thebarton Oval (crowd: 4,228)
Saturday, 1 May 1926	Sturt 8.13 (61)	def.	Norwood 7.10 (52)	Unley Oval (crowd: 10,500)
Glenelg's score was its lowest until kicking only 1.4 (10) against Norwood in Round 16, 2004, and still its third-lowest ever.

=== Round 2 ===
	Round 2
Saturday, 8 May 1926	South Adelaide 9.12 (66)	def. by	Norwood 13.20 (98)	Adelaide Oval (crowd: 14,500)
Saturday, 8 May 1926	Glenelg 5.9 (39)	def. by	West Adelaide 11.10 (76)	Glenelg Oval (crowd: 2,500)
Saturday, 8 May 1926	North Adelaide 10.9 (69)	def.	Sturt 8.6 (54)	Prospect Oval (crowd: 7,485)
Saturday, 8 May 1926	West Torrens 12.10 (82)	def.	Port Adelaide 5.3 (33)	Thebarton Oval (crowd: 11,691)

=== Round 3 ===
	Round 3
Saturday, 15 May 1926	West Adelaide 7.7 (49)	def. by	West Torrens 13.11 (89)	Adelaide Oval (crowd: 17,000)
Saturday, 15 May 1926	Port Adelaide 17.21 (123)	def.	Glenelg 9.4 (58)	Alberton Oval (crowd: 6,100)
Saturday, 15 May 1926	Norwood 14.7 (91)	def.	North Adelaide 10.15 (75)	Norwood Oval (crowd: 11,000)
Saturday, 15 May 1926	Sturt 19.18 (132)	def.	South Adelaide 10.9 (69)	Unley Oval (crowd: 5,500)

=== Round 4 ===
	Round 4
Saturday, 22 May 1926	West Adelaide 7.12 (54)	def. by	Norwood 9.4 (58)	Adelaide Oval (crowd: 16,200)
Saturday, 22 May 1926	Port Adelaide 14.12 (96)	def.	South Adelaide 6.6 (42)	Alberton Oval (crowd: 6,000)
Saturday, 22 May 1926	Glenelg 9.10 (64)	def. by	Sturt 14.11 (95)	Glenelg Oval (crowd: 3,730)
Saturday, 22 May 1926	North Adelaide 10.6 (66)	def.	West Torrens 7.18 (60)	Prospect Oval (crowd: 9,400)

=== Round 5 ===
	Round 5
Saturday, 29 May 1926	South Adelaide 9.14 (68)	drew with	West Torrens 9.14 (68)	Adelaide Oval (crowd: 9,000)
Saturday, 29 May 1926	Glenelg 8.12 (60)	def. by	North Adelaide 9.14 (68)	Glenelg Oval (crowd: 2,400)
Saturday, 29 May 1926	Norwood 9.10 (64)	def. by	Port Adelaide 8.18 (66)	Norwood Oval (crowd: 12,000)
Saturday, 29 May 1926	Sturt 10.17 (77)	def.	West Adelaide 5.7 (37)	Unley Oval (crowd: 7,000)

=== Round 6 (King's Birthday) ===
	Round 6
Saturday, 5 June 1926	South Adelaide 10.11 (71)	def. by	Glenelg 12.9 (81)	Adelaide Oval (crowd: 7,800)
Saturday, 5 June 1926	Norwood 10.14 (74)	def.	West Torrens 9.4 (58)	Norwood Oval (crowd: 16,000)
Monday, 7 June 1926	West Adelaide 11.13 (79)	def. by	North Adelaide 13.9 (87)	Adelaide Oval (crowd: 13,250)
Monday, 7 June 1926	Port Adelaide 7.9 (51)	def.	Sturt 4.5 (29)	Alberton Oval (crowd: 14,000)
Glenelg wins its first-ever away game after 37 consecutive losses since entering the League.; The attendance at Alberton was a record for the ground, and Port's gritty play shuts out the Double Blues.

=== Round 7 ===
	Round 7
Saturday, 19 June 1926	South Adelaide 11.10 (76)	def. by	West Adelaide 18.9 (117)	Adelaide Oval (crowd: 5,900)
Saturday, 19 June 1926	Glenelg 10.10 (70)	def.	Norwood 10.6 (66)	Glenelg Oval (crowd: 5,500)
Saturday, 19 June 1926	North Adelaide 6.5 (41)	def. by	Port Adelaide 8.15 (63)	Prospect Oval (crowd: 10,940)
Saturday, 19 June 1926	West Torrens 14.7 (91)	def.	Sturt 6.16 (52)	Thebarton Oval (crowd: 11,200)

=== Round 8 ===
	Round 8
Saturday, 26 June 1926	South Adelaide 7.8 (50)	def. by	North Adelaide 10.11 (71)	Adelaide Oval (crowd: 7,000])
Saturday, 26 June 1926	Port Adelaide 9.18 (72)	def. by	West Adelaide 12.11 (83)	Alberton Oval (crowd: 8,000)
Saturday, 26 June 1926	Glenelg 7.13 (55)	def.	West Torrens 7.7 (49)	Glenelg Oval (crowd: 6,200)
Saturday, 26 June 1926	Norwood 10.10 (70)	def.	Sturt 9.5 (59)	Norwood Oval (crowd: 12,000)

=== Interstate Game v. Western Australia ===
South Australia v. Western Australia
Saturday, 3 July 1926	South Australia	def.	Western Australia	Adelaide Oval
2.3 (15); 6.7 (43); 7.9 (51); 8.10 (58)	Q1; Q2; Q3; Final	1.5 (11); 2.7 (19); 2.13 (25); 4.16 (40)	Umpires: Quinn
McGregor 3, Bent 3, Oliver, Ryan	Goals	Gosnells, Gibson, Owens, Duffy
Scrutton, Bent, Scott, Lill, Golding, Ryan, Oliver	Best	Duffy, Saddam, Outridge, Western, Dolan, Hamilton, McDiarmid

=== Round 9 ===
	Round 9
Saturday, 10 July 1926	West Adelaide 10.17 (77)	def.	Glenelg 7.7 (49)	Adelaide Oval (crowd: 9,500)
Saturday, 10 July 1926	Port Adelaide 12.11 (83)	def.	West Torrens 9.8 (62)	Alberton Oval (crowd: 10,500)
Saturday, 10 July 1926	Norwood 13.17 (95)	def.	South Adelaide 9.11 (65)	Norwood Oval (crowd: 6,000)
Saturday, 10 July 1926	Sturt 9.12 (66)	def.	North Adelaide 8.10 (58)	Unley Oval (crowd: 11,000)

=== Round 10 ===
	Round 10
Saturday, 17 July 1926	South Adelaide 11.8 (74)	def. by	Sturt 20.12 (132)	Adelaide Oval (crowd: 8,000)
Saturday, 17 July 1926	Glenelg 11.5 (71)	def. by	Port Adelaide 10.17 (77)	Glenelg Oval7,500 (crowd:)
Saturday, 17 July 1926	North Adelaide 9.12 (66)	def. by	Norwood 13.5 (83)	Prospect Oval11,150 (crowd:)
Saturday, 17 July 1926	West Torrens 16.14 (110)	def.	West Adelaide 10.8 (68)	Thebarton Oval8,000 (crowd:)

=== Round 11 ===
	Round 11
Saturday, 24 July 1926	Glenelg 16.16 (112)	def.	South Adelaide 12.13 (85)	Glenelg Oval (crowd: 2,000)
Saturday, 24 July 1926	North Adelaide 10.16 (76)	def.	West Adelaide 5.15 (45)	Prospect Oval (crowd: 5,588)
Saturday, 24 July 1926	West Torrens 16.14 (110)	def.	Norwood 10.8 (68)	Thebarton Oval (crowd: 9,631)
Saturday, 24 July 1926	Sturt 8.10 (58)	def.	Port Adelaide 6.10 (46)	Unley Oval (crowd: 11,000)

=== Interstate Match v. Victoria ===
South Australia v. Victoria
Saturday, 31 July 1926	South Australia	def. by	Victoria (VFL)	Adelaide Oval (crowd: 24,3000)
2.1 (13); 2.2 (14); 3.2 (20); 4.4 (28)	Q1; Q2; Q3; Final	0.7 (7); 3.8 (26); 6.12 (48); 11.15 (81)
Dayman, Boyle, Bent, Riley	Goals	Davis 3, Gordon Coventry 2, Chapman 2, Fleming 2, Miller, Taylor
Riley, Whitehead, Keal, Conrad, Handby	Best	Syd Coventry, Duncan, Oaten, Wilson, Miller, Baker, Davie, Fleming, Chapman
In wet conditions, the locals are completely outplayed after quarter-time, and Victoria re-establishes prestige lost against South Australia and Western Australia earlier in the season.

=== Round 12 ===
	Round 12
Saturday, 7 August 1926	South Adelaide 10.4 (64)	def. by	Port Adelaide 15.22 (112)	Adelaide Oval (crowd: 5,800)
Saturday, 7 August 1926	Norwood 10.12 (72)	def.	West Adelaide 7.13 (55)	Norwood Oval (crowd: 9,500)
Saturday, 7 August 1926	West Torrens 9.8 (62)	def.	North Adelaide 7.9 (51)	Thebarton Oval (crowd: 8,656)
Saturday, 7 August 1926	Sturt 10.12 (72)	def.	Glenelg 4.3 (27)	Unley Oval (crowd: 5,300)

=== Round 13 ===
	Round 13
Saturday, 14 August 1926	West Adelaide 11.9 (75)	def. by	Sturt 13.15 (93)	Adelaide Oval (crowd: 14,000)
Saturday, 14 August 1926	Port Adelaide 17.15 (117)	def.	Norwood 11.8 (74)	Alberton Oval (crowd: 14,000)
Saturday, 14 August 1926	North Adelaide 8.21 (69)	def.	Glenelg 9.6 (60)	Prospect Oval (crowd: 3,900)
Saturday, 14 August 1926	West Torrens 12.18 (90)	def.	South Adelaide 10.9 (69)	Thebarton Oval (crowd: 5,000)
By kicking six of Glenelg's nine goals despite a heavy fall and a cut lip, Owens becomes the highest goalkicker in the League since "Bos" Daly in 1893.; Sturt's win puts West out of the running for the finals, and leaves the minor premiership battle a two-way duel with Port Adelaide.

=== Round 14 ===
	Round 14
Saturday, 4 September 1926	South Adelaide 8.13 (61)	def. by	West Adelaide 13.17 (95)	Adelaide Oval (crowd: 2,000)
Saturday, 4 September 1926	Port Adelaide 9.16 (70)	def.	North Adelaide 6.6 (42)	Alberton Oval (crowd: 4,900)
Saturday, 4 September 1926	Norwood 20.10 (130)	def.	Glenelg 9.8 (62)	Norwood Oval (crowd: 6,000)
Saturday, 4 September 1926	Sturt 7.18 (60)	def.	West Torrens 6.6 (42)	Unley Oval (crowd: 15,000)

== Ladder ==
1926 SAFL Ladder
Pos	Team	Pld	W	L	D	PF	PA	PP	Pts
1	Sturt (P)	14	10	4	0	1052	825	56.05	20
2	Port Adelaide	14	10	4	0	1046	851	55.14	20
3	Norwood	14	9	5	0	1095	985	52.64	18
4	North Adelaide	14	8	6	0	899	899	50.00	16
5	West Torrens	14	7	6	1	1004	844	54.33	15
6	West Adelaide	14	7	7	0	1005	945	51.54	14
7	Glenelg	14	4	10	0	830	1139	42.15	8
8	South Adelaide	14	0	13	1	916	1359	40.26	1

Rules for classification: 1) points; 2) percentage; 3) number of points for.
(P) Premiers

== Major Round ==
=== First Semi-Final ===
1926 SAFL First Semi-Final
Saturday, 11 September 1926	Sturt	def. by	Norwood	Adelaide Oval (crowd: 32,000)
1.6 (12); 3.9 (27); 5.11 (41); 6.12 (48)	Q1; Q2; Q3; Final	2.3 (15); 2.5 (17); 4.7 (31); 9.11 (65)	Umpires: Quinn
G. Scrutton 2, H. Bauer 2, C. Whitehead, N. Barron	Goals	Mutton 2, Palmer 2, Whitfield, Bent, Wadham, Schneider, Gleeson
Barron, Richardson, Weller, McGaffin, Martin, Riley	Best	Ackland, Scott, Geary, Gleeson, Schneider, Symonds, Daly, Lill

=== Second Semi-Final ===
1926 SAFL Second Semi-Final
Saturday, 18 September 1926	Port Adelaide	def. by	North Adelaide	Adelaide Oval (crowd: 32,000)
2.1 (13); 6.6 (42); 9.9 (63); 9.13 (67)	Q1; Q2; Q3; Final	5.4 (34); 8.8 (56); 12.11 (83); 15.14 (104)	Umpires: Quinn
Dayman 4.4, Logan 2.2, Hoffman, Utting, Galliford 1.0, Maddern, Coldwell 0.2, Coffen, Ween 0.1	Goals	Fleet 5.5, Low, Furler 3.0, McDowell 2.1, Leahy 1.1, Moyle 1.0, Hawke 0.3, Munn 0.2, Townley 0.1
Dayman, Keal, Maywald, Utting	Best	Conrad, Townley, Fleet, Thomas, Ween, Low, Furler, Hawke

=== Final ===
1926 SAFL Final
Saturday, 25 September 1926	Norwood	def. by	North Adelaide	Adelaide Oval (crowd: 40,000)
4.1 (25); 4.2 (26); 9.7 (61); 10.8 (68)	Q1; Q2; Q3; Final	3.4 (22); 8.6 (54); 9.6 (60); 11.11 (77)	Umpires: Quinn
Bent 3, Schneider 2, Mutton 2, Wadham, Siggins, Palmer	Goals	Fleet 5, Hawke, Moyle, Munn, Furler, Mcdowall, Leahy
Lill, Bent, Mutton, Scott, Errington, Geary, Schneider, Schumacher	Best	Fleet, Effick, Leahy, Dilliway, Morris, Moyle, Ween, Hawke, Lewis

=== Grand Final ===
1926 SANFL Grand Final
Saturday 26 September	Sturt	def.	North Adelaide	Adelaide Oval (crowd: 30,000)
3.2 (20); 4.5 (29); 7.7 (49); 9.10 (64)	Q1; Q2; Q3; Final	2.3 (15); 3.5 (23); 5.7 (37); 7.9 (51)	Umpires: Quinn
Scrutton 3.2, Smith 3.1, Barron 1.2, C. Whitehead, Riley 1.1, R.H. Whitehead 0.2, Martin, Rau 0.1	Goals	Furler, Munn 2.1, Fleet 1.2, Low 1.1, McDowell 1.0, Townley 0.2, Thomas, Hawke 0.1
G. Scrutton, Richardson, Riley, R. Whitehead, Martin, Barron, McGaffin	Best	Hawke, Thomas, Effick, Moyle, Dilliway (until injured)
Injuries	Dilliway (concussion); Hutton (concussion)
