= 1899 SAFA season =

1899 SANFL season
- Teams: 6
- Premiers: South Adelaide; 8th premiership
- Minor premiers: South Adelaide; 2nd minor premiership
- Magarey Medallist: Stan Malin; Port Adelaide
- Ken Farmer Medallist: Anthony Daly; South Adelaide (32 Goals)
- Matches played: 44
- Highest: (Grand Final, South Adelaide vs. Norwood)

The 1899 SAFA season was the 23rd edition of the top level of Australian Rules football to be played in South Australia. South Adelaide went on to record its 8th premiership.

== Electorate football ==
The 1899 season saw the introduction of compulsory electorate football in Adelaide, forcing players to play for the club in the district in which they resided. Teams were also reduced from 20 to 18 players the same as Victoria.

In the last decade, football in Adelaide had been suffering from reduced public interest, and the three weaker teams (West Adelaide, North Adelaide and West Torrens) always operated at a financial loss, exacerbated by their poor records on field.

It was thought that by introducing electorate football, the talent would be spread more evenly across the six teams, making for more entertaining matches and higher attendances across all teams. The proposed changes were fought by South Adelaide and Port Adelaide, who threatened to leave the SAFA and form their own league if they were brought in. As a compromise, the scheme was brought in on a one-year trial basis, before ultimately being accepted permanently.

== Minor rounds ==
The minor rounds comprised twelve matches. South Adelaide finished as the minor premiers, one point ahead of Norwood.

1899 SAFA Minor Premiership Ladder
Pos	Team	Pld	W	L	D	PF	PA	PP	Pts
1	South Adelaide (P)	12	9	3	0	580	387	59.98	18
2	Norwood	12	8	3	1	525	391	57.31	17
3	Port Adelaide	12	8	4	0	575	293	66.24	16
4	West Torrens	12	5	7	0	426	499	46.05	10
5	West Adelaide	12	4	8	0	347	573	37.72	8
6	North Adelaide	12	1	10	1	383	693	35.59	3

Rules for classification: 1) points; 2) percentage; 3) number of points for.
(P) Premiers

== Major rounds ==
The major premiership was contested under the VFL finals system which had been adopted by the Victorian Football League in 1898, but adapted by the SAFA for six teams instead of eight.

The six teams were broken into two sections:
Section A comprised South Adelaide (1st), Port Adelaide (3rd) and West Adelaide (5th).
Section B comprised Norwood (2nd), West Adelaide (4th) and North Adelaide (6th).

Each section played an individual round-robin; then, the section winners South Adelaide and Norwood played off in a final.

=== Sectional matches ===
	Sectional matches – Section A
Saturday, 12 August	South Adelaide 11.11 (77)	def.	West Adelaide 6.7 (43)	Adelaide Oval
Saturday, 19 August	Port Adelaide 9.12 (66)	def.	West Adelaide 3.6 (24)	Jubilee Oval
Saturday, 26 August	South Adelaide 16.7 (103)	def.	Port Adelaide 1.4 (10)	Adelaide Oval

	Sectional matches – Section B
Saturday, 12 August	West Torrens 7.16 (58)	def.	North Adelaide 6.14 (50)	Jubilee Oval
Saturday, 19 August	Norwood 13.12 (90)	def.	North Adelaide 4.5 (29)	Adelaide Oval
Saturday, 1 September	Norwood 4.15 (39)	def.	West Torrens 3.7 (25)	Jubilee Oval

1899 Section A Ladder
Pos	Team	Pld	W	L	D	PF	PA	PP	Pts
1	South Adelaide	2	2	0	0	180	53	77.25	4
2	Port Adelaide	2	1	1	0	76	127	37.44	2
3	West Adelaide	2	0	2	0	67	143	31.90	0

Rules for classification: 1) points; 2) percentage; 3) number of points for.

1899 Section B Ladder
Pos	Team	Pld	W	L	D	PF	PA	PP	Pts
1	Norwood	2	2	0	0	129	54	70.49	4
2	West Torrens	2	1	1	0	83	89	48.26	2
3	North Adelaide	2	0	2	0	79	148	34.80	0

Rules for classification: 1) points; 2) percentage; 3) number of points for.

=== Finals ===
	1899 SAFA Final
Saturday, 2 September	South Adelaide 5.2 (32)	def. by	Norwood 7.11 (53)	Adelaide Oval
The minor premiers, South Adelaide, as the loser of the major round final, then had the right to challenge the winner Norwood to a grand final for the premiership.

1899 SAFA Challenge Grand Final
Saturday, 9 September	South Adelaide	def.	Norwood	Adelaide Oval
1.6 (12); 1.9 (15); 2.9 (21); 5.12 (42)	Q1; Q2; Q3; Final	0.0 (0); 1.0 (6); 1.0 (6); 2.2 (14)	Umpires: Henry "Ivo" Crapp
Daly 4, Gartrell	Goals	Miller 2
