= 1960 SANFL season =

- Teams: 10
- Premiers: North Adelaide; 9th premiership
- Minor premiers: Port Adelaide; 29th minor premiership
- Magarey Medallist: Barrie Barbary; North Adelaide
- Ken Farmer Medallist: Wally Dittmar; Port Adelaide (69 Goals)

Attendance
- Matches played: 76
- Total attendance: 830,498 (10,928 per match)
- Highest: 54,162 (Grand Final, North Adelaide vs. Norwood)

The 1960 South Australian National Football League season was the 81st season of the top-level Australian rules football competition in South Australia.

North Adelaide won the 1960 Grand Final, defeating Norwood by 5 points.

== Ladder ==
1960 SANFL Ladder
Pos	Team	Pld	W	L	D	PF	PA	PP	Pts
1	Port Adelaide	18	14	4	0	1587	1073	59.66	28
2	North Adelaide (P)	18	13	5	0	1516	1165	56.55	26
3	Norwood	18	11	7	0	1679	1371	55.05	22
4	West Adelaide	18	11	7	0	1577	1427	52.50	22
5	West Torrens	18	10	8	0	1336	1317	50.36	20
6	Sturt	18	8	10	0	1651	1567	51.31	16
7	South Adelaide	18	3	15	0	1029	1835	35.93	6
8	Glenelg	18	2	16	0	1289	1909	40.31	4

Rules for classification: 1) points; 2) percentage; 3) number of points for.
(P) Premiers

== Finals Series ==
=== Grand Final ===
1960 SANFL Grand Final
Saturday, 1 October 1960 (2:10 pm)	Norwood	def. by	North Adelaide	Adelaide Oval (crowd: 54,162)
4.2 (26); 7.5 (47); 10.12 (72); 13.12 (90)	Q1; Q2; Q3; Final	5.5 (35); 8.6 (54); 11.10 (76); 14.11 (95)
