= 1901 SAFA season =

1901 SAFA premiership season
- Teams: 7
- Premiers: Norwood; 12th premiership
- Minor premiers: Norwood; 3rd minor premiership
- Magarey Medallist: Phil Sandland; North Adelaide
- Leading goalkicker: William Miller; Norwood (44 Goals)
- Matches played: 64
- Highest: 7,000 (Grand Final, Norwood vs. Port Adelaide)

The 1901 South Australian Football Association season was the 25th season of the top-level Australian rules football competition in South Australia. Minor premier Norwood won its 12th premiership when it defeated Port Adelaide in the Final by 4 points.

== Expansion to Seven Teams ==
The season marked the formation and debut of the new Sturt Football Club which was allocated the vacant zone Electoral District of Sturt and based at Unley Oval.

== Season ==
The season was played under conventions similar to, but was amended from, the previous two seasons and the 1898 VFL finals system used in the VFL in 1898–1900.

In the minor round, all seven clubs played a double round-robin of twelve matches, and in the major round, all seven clubs played a single round-robin of six matches.

If the minor premiers won the major round, then that team would automatically win the major premiership. If they did not, then the major round winner would be required to defeat the minor premiers in two separate challenge finals to claim the premiership, effectively giving the minor premiers a triple chance to win the premiership.

The minor premier was Norwood, which finished two games clear on top of the ladder with a 10–2 record; however, the club's major round performance was mediocre, finishing fourth with a record of 3–3. Conversely, Port Adelaide, who had finished fourth in the minor rounds with a 6–6 record, was the undefeated winner of the major round.

Norwood then defeated Port Adelaide by four points in the first challenge match to win the club's twelfth premiership.

Final competition placings were based on the combined major and minor round results. As such, Sturt – which was second-last in both the major and minor rounds – was finished in last place overall and is recognised as wooden spooner in its inaugural season.

=== Minor round ===
1901 SAFA Minor Premiership Ladder
Pos	Team	Pld	W	L	D	PF	PA	PP	Pts
1	Norwood (P)	12	10	2	0	684	380	64.29	20
2	North Adelaide	12	8	4	0	684	494	58.06	16
3	West Torrens	12	6	6	0	573	489	53.95	12
4	Port Adelaide	12	6	6	0	523	459	53.26	12
5	South Adelaide	12	5	7	0	400	590	40.40	10
6	Sturt	12	4	8	0	409	664	38.12	8
7	West Adelaide	12	3	9	0	467	664	41.29	6

Rules for classification: 1) points; 2) percentage; 3) number of points for.
(P) Premiers

=== Major round ===
1901 SAFA Major Premiership Ladder
Pos	Team	Pld	W	L	D	PF	PA	PP	Pts
1	Port Adelaide	6	6	0	0	306	176	63.49	12
2	North Adelaide	6	4	2	0	272	240	53.13	8
3	West Adelaide	6	4	2	0	184	200	47.92	8
4	Norwood	6	3	3	0	233	233	50.00	6
5	South Adelaide	5	1	4	0	217	149	59.29	2 (Note: See notable events below)
6	Sturt	5	1	4	0	127	191	39.94	2
7	West Torrens	6	0	6	0	198	310	38.98	0

Rules for classification: 1) points; 2) percentage; 3) number of points for.

=== Challenge Final ===
1901 SAFA Final
Saturday, 5 October	Norwood	def.	Port Adelaide	Adelaide Oval (crowd: 6,000–7000)
1.1 (7); 1.3 (9); 4.5 (29); 4.9 (33)	Q1; Q2; Q3; Final	2.1 (13); 2.2 (14); 2.5 (17); 4.5 (29)
Dawson, Kirkwood, MacFarlane, Webb	Goals	J. Davis 2, Healey, Quinn
Had Port Adelaide won the match, Norwood would have been entitled to one further challenge match for the major premiership.

== Notable events ==
- South Adelaide did not play its final two major round matches, scheduled for 21 and 28 September against West Adelaide and Sturt. The match against West Adelaide was ruled to have been forfeited by the SAFA after the Jubilee Oval had been double-booked, meaning that West Adelaide arrived at the ground to discover there was a cricket match in progress. The match against Sturt was scratched as the ladder would not be affected; this is historically considered to be an unplayed game, with no competition points awarded to either team.
