= Stephen Nichols (footballer) =

Australian rules footballer (born 1963)

Personal information
- Born: 6 August 1964 (age 62)
- Original team: Sandy Bay (Tasmanian Football League)
- Height: 182 cm (6 ft 0 in)
- Weight: 81 kg (179 lb)
- Position: Full-forward

Playing career^{1}
Years	Club	Games (Goals)
1982–83	Geelong	7 (6)
- ^{1} Playing statistics correct to the end of 1983.

Stephen Nichols (born 18 June 1963) is a former Australian rules footballer who played for Geelong in the Victorian Football League (VFL) and Woodville in the South Australian Football League (SANFL) during the 1980s.

Originally from Tasmanian Football League club Sandy Bay, Nichols was recruited by Geelong and made his senior VFL debut in 1982. Nichols was unable to cement a position in Geelong's senior side and played mainly in Geelong's reserves side, including their 1982 reserves premiership, where he played centre half forward.

Nichols was released by Geelong at the end of the 1983 VFL season and recruited by Woodville after being recommended to the club by fellow Tasmanian footballer Darryl Sutton. Playing at full-forward, Nichols won the Ken Farmer Medal for the completion's leading goal-kicker twice, with 103 goals in both 1986 and 1988. He kicked 108 goals in 1987 but trailed North Adelaide's John Roberts in the Ken Farmer Medal, who kicked 111.

Nichols represented Tasmania at the 1988 Adelaide Bicentennial Carnival, kicking six goals against the Northern Territory.
