= Wally Dittmar =

Australian rules footballer

Personal information
- Full name: Wallace John Dittmar
- Born: 1934; South Australia
- Died: 31 December 1982; Adelaide
- Original team: Port Adelaide
- Position: Full Forward

Playing career
Years	Club	Games (Goals)
1952–1963	Port Adelaide	79

Representative team honours
Years	Team	Games (Goals)
	South Australia	6

Career highlights
- Port Adelaide premiership player (1959); 2x SANFL leading goalkicker (1959, 1960); 2x Port Adelaide leading goalkicker (1959, 1960)

Wally Dittmar was an Australian rules footballer for the Port Adelaide Football Club.

== Coaching ==
After retiring from playing Wally Dittmar coached at Rosewater and Loxton.
