= Daniel Schell =

Australian rules footballer (born 1980)

Personal information
- Born: 20 January 1980 (age 46)
- Original team: Central District (SANFL)
- Debut: Round 15, 2000, Fremantle vs. Sydney, at Subiaco Oval

Playing career^{1}
Years	Club	Games (Goals)
2000–2001	Fremantle	16 (11)
2002–2003	Adelaide	11 (9)
Total		27 (20)
- ^{1} Playing statistics correct to the end of 2003.

Daniel Schell (born 20 January 1980) is an Australian rules footballer. He played for both the Fremantle and the Adelaide Football Clubs. He was drafted from Central District in the SANFL as the 18th selection in the 1998 AFL draft and played mainly as a full forward.

, Schell played four seasons at AFL level before finding greater success as a forward in the SANFL. He became a prolific goal scorer at state league level, finishing as the leading goal kicker in the SANFL twice, including three times with Central District and twice with South Fremantle. He was also recognised for his aerial ability, winning Best Mark on the Field in two consecutive seasons being the leading goal scoring in the SANFL twice, for Central District three times and for South Fremantle twice.
