= 1898 VFL finals system =

In 1898, its second season of competition, the Victorian Football League (VFL) devised and adopted a new playoff tournament which allowed all of the league's clubs a chance to compete for the premiership after the home-and-away season was complete. The system and related variations were used by the VFL between 1898 and 1900 and by the South Australian Football Association (SAFA) between 1899 and 1901.

The system fell into disfavour after Melbourne won the 1900 VFL premiership, despite finishing the home-and-away season sixth out of eight clubs. It was replaced in both leagues by the Argus finals systems.

The short-lived system was not widely used outside those two competitions, and has no commonly recognised name. It can be considered a form of the more general split season system, but with the season split into highly asymmetrical halves.

== System ==
Prior to 1897, Australian rules football premierships were decided solely on win–loss record across the entire season. To counteract reduced public interest and gate takings when a season had a runaway leader, the Victorian Football League (VFL) had introduced finals in 1897, ensuring the premiership would remain undecided until the end of the year.

A new system was devised by the VFL in 1898. The premise was that after the completion of the minor round (known today as the home and away season, regular season or similar), all clubs would then compete in a separate and shorter stand-alone competition, known as the major round. The winner of the major round would play off against the team which finished on top of the minor round ladder (known as the minor premiers) in a challenge match; the winner of the challenge match would be crowned premiers. No challenge match was required if the minor premiers also won the major round.

In the senior leagues which used the systems, the arrangements were as follows.

=== VFL (1898–1900) ===
The VFL used the system for three seasons, with eight clubs. The season arrangements were:

- Minor round – a double round-robin among all eight clubs (14 matches).
- Major round – the eight clubs were split into two groups based on minor round finishing positions: 1st, 3rd, 5th and 7th; and 2nd, 4th, 6th and 8th. Each group played a single round-robin (three matches). The winner of the major round was then determined by a final between the leading club in each group.
- Grand final (if required) – minor premier vs major round final winner

A stipulation was included to remove the minor premier's right to challenge for the premiership if it failed to earn at least eight premiership points in its major round matches. This was to prevent the minor premier from resting players or failing to take the major round seriously. A trophy – separate to the main premiership pennant – was presented to the minor premiers by the league.

=== SAFA (1899–1900) ===
The South Australian Football Association (SAFA) first adopted the system in 1899, when the association had six clubs. Its arrangements were:

- Minor round – a league competition among all six clubs (12 matches)
- Major round – the six clubs were split into two groups based on minor round finishing positions: 1st, 3rd and 5th; and 2nd, 4th and 6th. Each group played a single round-robin (two matches). The winner of the major round was determined by a final between the two groups' leading clubs.
- Grand final (if required) – minor premier vs major round final winner

Unlike the VFL, the SAFA did not adopt any provision to remove the minor premier's right to challenge after the major round.

=== SAFA (1901) ===
When a seventh club was admitted to the SAFA in 1901, the association amended the system as follows:

- Minor round – a double round-robin among all seven clubs (12 matches)
- Major round – a single round-robin among all seven clubs (6 matches), won by the club with the best record
- Two grand finals (if required) - minor premier vs major round final winner

The SAFA added a second challenge match, meaning that the leading club of the major round was then required to defeat the minor premier twice to win the premiership. The minor premier would win the premiership if it won either of the challenge matches.

== Problems with the finals system ==
The finals system had the major drawback that it allowed a club to win the premiership regardless of its home-and-away season form. This possibility was recognised from the beginning, and it took only three years for these fears to be realised: Melbourne winning the VFL premiership 1900 from sixth place out of eight on the home-and-away ladder, and only the fifth-best overall record with all matches included. This resulted in the discontinuation of the system in the VFL from 1901.

There was also confusion over the allocation of the minor placings – whether it should be based on overall win–loss record, or the convention of the team which lost the grand final being runners-up.

== Legacy ==
Even though the 1898 finals system was short-lived in its use, the innovation of minor premier's right of challenge remained popular, and became the distinguishing feature of the Argus finals systems which found use in the VFL, SAFA and other competitions over the next half-century.

The system was the first to introduce the term "minor premiership", which is still widely used in modern Australian sports for the team on top the ladder after a home-and-away season.

== See also ==
- Split season, a similar system for determining a premiership
