= Roy Bent =

Australian rules footballer

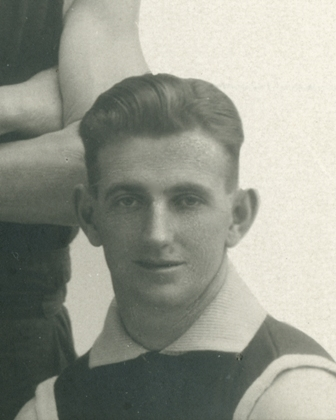

Personal information
- Full name: Roy Edward Kimberley Bent
- Nickname: Cool Alec
- Born: 1900; Broken Hill, New South Wales
- Died: 7 October 1975 (aged 75); Mount Gambier, South Australia
- Original team: North Broken Hill
- Position: Full Forward

Playing career^{1}
Years	Club	Games (Goals)
1921–1928	Norwood	98 (333)

Representative team honours
Years	Team	Games (Goals)
	South Australia	17 (60)
- ^{1} Playing statistics correct to the end of 1928.

Career highlights
- 2x Norwood premiership player (1922, 1925); 4x SANFL leading goal kicker (1921, 1924, 1925, 1926); 5x Norwood leading goalkicker

Roy Edward Kimberley "Alex" Bent (1900 – 7 October 1975) was an Australian rules footballer who played with the Norwood Football Club in the South Australian Football Association.

== Family ==
The son of Christopher Bent (1863–1916), and Ellen Edith Bent (1868–1951), née Bird, Roy Edward Kimberley Bent was born at Broken Hill, New South Wales in 1900.

He married Muriel Helen Topham (1904–1974) on 15 February 1930.

== Football ==
He was the competition's leading goal kicker on four occasions 1921, 1924, 1925 and 1926. In 1924, Bent became the first player to kick ten goals in a SAFL final when he kicked ten against West Torrens in the First Semi, a feat since emulated only by Rick Davies in 1983, Scott Hodges in 1990, and John Fidge in 1992.

=== Suspension before 1923 Grand Final ===
In September 1923 Bent was suspended for six matches for throwing the ball at a boundary umpire and "bruising his chest" — the boundary umpire had signalled that, as Bent raced down the boundary line towards the goal, the ball was out of bounds; Bent thought otherwise — in the match against South Adelaide on 8 September 1923. Upon a vigorous appeal, his suspension was later reduced to three weeks.

On 29 September 1923, on the day of the Grand Final (from which Bent had been suspended), Bent was jokingly awarded a leather medal, by a group called the "Wallaby Club Sympathisers", in remembrance of his suspension.

=== Attempted clearance and accident ===
Following the 1926 season, Collingwood aimed to recruit Bent to build up its team after losing two consecutive Grand Finals.

Bent would never be granted a clearance to play for the VFL Magpies, and on 27 December of 1926 he would suffer a major head injury when he put his head outside a tram's window. This accident would virtually end his career: Bent played only a few more matches for Norwood in 1927 and 1928 and could never reproduce his previous form.

== Death ==
He was killed in a car accident in 1975.
