= Anthony Daly (footballer) =

Australian rules footballer

Anthony "Bos" Daly
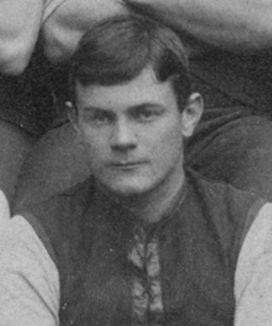

Personal information
- Full name: Anthony Joseph Daly
- Nickname: Bos
- Born: 9 January 1874; South Australia
- Died: 21 August 1942 (aged 68); Prospect, South Australia
- Position: Full forward

Playing career
Years	Club	Games (Goals)
1893–1898	Norwood	73 (238)
1899	South Adelaide	16 (32)
1900	West Torrens	14 (28)
1901	West Adelaide	17 (23)
1902–1909, 1912	North Adelaide	93 (235)
Total		213 (556)

Representative team honours
Years	Team	Games (Goals)
- South Australia

Career highlights
- 4x Norwood premiership player; 2x North Adelaide premiership player; South Adelaide premiership player; 7x SANFL leading goal kicker, 1893, 1894, 1895, 1899, 1900, 1903, 1905 (joint); 7x Leading goal kicker for North Adelaide, 1902, 1903, 1904, 1905, 1906, 1907, 1912; 4x Leading goal kicker for Norwood, 1893, 1894, 1895, 1898; Leading goal kicker for South Adelaide, 1899; Leading goal kicker for West Adelaide, 1901; Most goals in a SANFL game (jointly with Ken Farmer), and in an elite Australian Rules football game (jointly with Farmer and Bernie Naylor) (23)

Anthony Joseph "Bos" Daly (9 January 1874 – 21 August 1942) was an Australian rules footballer who played for the five teams in the South Australian Football Association (SAFA) between 1893 and 1912.

== Family ==
He is the brother of John "Bunny" Daly, who was also inducted in the South Australian Football Hall of Fame.

== Football ==
In 1893, whilst playing for Norwood, he set a record for the most goals kicked by a player in a single game of elite football, which has been equaled but remains unbeaten to date. Daly kicked 23 of Norwood's 29 goals in a 27-goal win over Adelaide (unrelated to the modern-day AFL team). However, due to the visitors being unable to field a full team, the game was played with fourteen players per side instead of the normal twenty of the time.

Daly kicked 88 goals for the season, including 49 against Adelaide (he kicked five (on debut), six, and fifteen goals in the other three matches), who dropped out of the SAFA and folded at the end of 1893. Daly's season total remained an elite football record until broken by Bonny Campbell in the WAFL in 1926, and a South Australian record until broken by Ken Farmer in 1930.
