= Frank Golding =

Australian rules footballer

Personal information
- Full name: Francis Hallett Golding
- Born: 14 August 1890; Perth, Western Australia
- Died: 3 September 1966 (aged 76); Darlington, South Australia
- Original team: Leederville Juniors
- Height: 5 ft 11 in (181 cm)
- Weight: 11 st 11 lb (75 kg)
- Position: Full Forward/Full Back

Playing career^{1}
| Years | Club | Games (Goals) |
| 1907–1908 | West Perth | 30 (32) |
| 1909–1915, 1919–1927 | Sturt | 207 (240) |
| Total | | 237 (272) |

Coaching career^{3}
| Years | Club | Games (W–L–D) |
| 1921, 1925–1928 | Sturt | 66 (35–28–3) |
| 1934 | South Adelaide | 17 (4–13–0) |
| Total | | 83 (39–41–3) |
- ^{1} Playing statistics correct to the end of 1927.^{3} Coaching statistics correct as of 1934.

Career highlights
- Sturt premierships 1915, 1919, 1926; Sturt Team of the Century; 6x Sturt leading goalkicker; SAFL leading goalkicker 1920 (30 goals); 28 games for South Australia; South Australian Football Hall of Fame inductee 2002

Frank Golding (14 August 1890 – 3 September 1966) was an Australian rules footballer who played with Sturt in the South Australian Football League (SAFL) and with West Perth in the West Australian Football League.

== Career ==
Golding began his sporting career mainly playing soccer and cricket at Newcastle Street Public School in Perth. It was not until he was noticed by West Perth's Bert Renfrey in 1906 that he began playing Australian rules. After a season with the Leederville juniors, he was already under notice as a promising forward, and after a couple of games it was already predicted he would make a name for himself. In his second season, before his eighteenth birthday, Golding was mentioned as a candidate for interstate selection in July, and he would indeed be chosen for Western Australia the following month but withdrew due to a broken finger. Already at this stage Golding had become known for his marking skill and his long kicking: when he moved to South Australia it was noted that

[Golding] thinks nothing of sending the ball through [the goals] from 50 to 60 yards out

During the 1908–09 off-season, Golding planned to move to the South Melbourne Cricket Club under the auspices of Austin Diamond but was immediately noticed by Norwood's Bill Plunkett when the ship docked at Port Adelaide. However, the Redlegs' officials never turned up to sign him and Golding instead was given employment by Sturt patron John Dempsey, who would find employment for Golding as a timber merchant near Unley. Golding would immediately establish himself in a team that had not won a game in 1908, and by 1910 he was regarded as the best forward in the state, and had kicked 37 goals for the Double Blues that season.

Golding would have an indifferent season in 1911, but would head Sturt's goalkicking in every season but one from 1912 to 1921, (Note: Due to World War I there was no official SAFL football between 1916 and 1918, although Golding did play in unsanctioned patriotic competitions for a "West Adelaide" team and kicked 83 goals.) and establish himself as a regular South Australian representative by 1913. In 1914, he would win a goalkicking competition by drop-kicking 66.33 yards or 60.7 metres.

=== Transition to Champion Defender ===
After heading Sturt's goalkicking in the first three post-war seasons, being in the top two league goalkickers in 1913, 1914, 1919 and 1920 (Note: Golding was leading SAFL goalkicker in 1920 with 30 goals) and captaining the club in 1921, Golding at the beginning of the 1922 season was considering tending his resignation to the club. However, he rescinded this decision and was soon shifted to full-back. Despite being already thirty-two, Golding would almost immediately gain a reputation as a defender beyond what he obtained in his longer career as a forward. In 1923 he would establish himself as the State full-back, and win an award as the SAFL's best player for the season from Adelaide newspaper The News. 1924 would see Golding again rescind expectations of retirement and be acclaimed as the outstanding player of the Hobart Carnival.

Golding would captain-coach both Sturt and South Australia in 1925 and 1926. In the latter season at the age of thirty-five, he played as well as at any stage of his career and his safety and long kicking was a critical factor in the Double Blues' third premiership victory. 1927 saw him finally decline: although he achieved a long-held ambition of becoming the first player to play 200 SA(N)FL (Note: The South Australian Football League changed its name to the "South Australian National Football League" for the 1927 season) games, Golding, aged thirty-seven, announced his retirement as a player at the end of the season.

=== Non-Playing Coach ===
Golding stayed on at the Double Blues as a non-playing coach for the 1928 season, but it was already clear that it was a season for rebuilding and Sturt won just six and drew two of seventeen matches. He would subsequently move to coaching in the South Australian Amateur Football League with Teachers' College, and even umpiring some finals games in that league. Golding returned to the SANFL to coach South Adelaide in 1934, but would have no success coaching the blue and whites. South finished last with only four victories from seventeen matches in Golding's only season at the helm, and he was not re-appointed for 1935.
