= William Miller (Australian footballer) =

Australian rules footballer

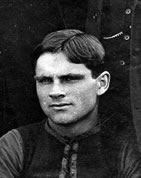

Personal information
- Full name: William Robert Miller
- Nickname: Darky
- Born: 29 December 1881; Kapunda, South Australia
- Died: 29 December 1912 (aged 31); Rose Park, South Australia
- Position: Full forward

Playing career^{1}
Years	Club	Games (Goals)
1899–1910	Norwood	110 (212)
1911	Sturt	

Representative team honours
Years	Team	Games (Goals)
	South Australia	9
- ^{1} Playing statistics correct to the end of 1910.

Career highlights
- 2x Norwood premiership player (1904, 1907); 2x SANFL leading goalkicker (1901, 1904); 7x Norwood leading goalkicker (1899, 1900, 1901, 1902, 1903, 1904, 1905); Norwood best and fairest (1905)

William Robert Miller (29 December 1881 – 29 December 1912) was an Australian rules footballer who played for Norwood in the South Australian National Football League (SANFL).

He died from typhoid on his 31st birthday, at a hospital in Rose Park.
