= 1879 SAFA season =

1879 SAFA premiership season
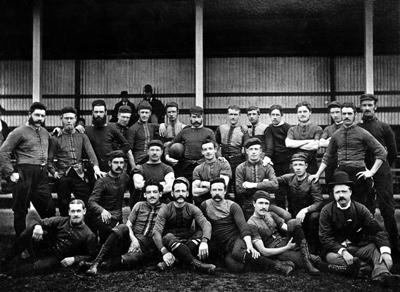
- Norwood premiership team
- Teams: 7
- Premiers: Norwood; 2nd premiership
- Leading goalkicker: William Dedman; Norwood (7 Goals)
- Matches played: 34
- Highest: 3,000 (Round 11, Norwood vs. Port Adelaide)

The 1879 South Australian Football Association season was the 3rd season of the top-level Australian rules football competition in South Australia.

The Norwood Football Club went on to record its 2nd consecutive premiership, going through the season undefeated for the second consecutive season (9 wins and 1 draw).

The Kensington Football Club received its second consecutive wooden spoon, failing to win a game, and extending its winless streak to 27.

Several disputes between South Adelaide and the other clubs arose during the season. This was principally due to rough play. The Association officially sanctioned that any Club not wanting to play against South Adelaide that a forfeit would not be recorded.

== Second Twenty Programmed Match ==
An official programme was also organised for the second twenties for all the clubs with South Adelaide winning the Premiership. Second Twenty games were also advertised and scheduled for a 3pm start, the same time as the First Twenty, but were programmed at the Home ground of the visiting First Twenty team.

== West Torrens application to join the SAFA rejected ==
West Torrens Football Club submitted an application to the join the SAFA but at the Association's Annual General Meeting held on 1 April 1879 the club's application was rejected by 12 votes to 19 against as a number of delegates felt there was already too many weak teams in the Association. The club would be admitted in 1887 when it renamed to West Adelaide but folded after one season.

== SAFA Senior Clubs 1879 Season ==
Club	Colours	Home Ground	Captain	Comments
Adelaide	Black Red	Old Adelaide Ground, North Adelaide	W.Hughes (retired); Wyatt	102 Members
Kensington	Scarlet White	Kensington Oval, Kensington	A.T. Harrison	
Norwood	Dark blue Red	East Park Lands, Adelaide	J.R.Osborne	
Port Adelaide	Magneta	Glanville Hall Estate	W. Fletcher	
South Adelaide	Navy Blue White	South Terrace, Adelaide	S.A. Wallace	
South Park	Light Blue White	South Park Lands, Adelaide	A.M.Pettinger	104 Members; 3 x Twenty Teams
Victorian	Orange Black	Montefiore Hill, North Adelaide	G. Downs; C. Warren	

== Preseason ==
	South Australians vs. Allcomers
Day, 10 May (3:30 pm)	South Australians 0	drew with	Allcomers 0	Adelaide Oval (crowd: 1,200)

== Premiership season ==
=== Round 1 ===
	Round 1
Saturday, 17 May (3:00 pm)	Norwood 1	def.	South Adelaide 0	East Park Lands (crowd: 2,000)
Saturday, 17 May (3:00 pm)	Kensington 3	def. by	Adelaide 5	Kensington Oval
Saturday, 17 May (3:00 pm)	South Park 0	def. by	Port Adelaide 2	Adelaide Oval
	Bye; Victorian
During the Norwood vs. South Adelaide game when A. Terrell kicked Norwood's second goal much disagreement and disorder ensued.

=== Round 2 ===
	Round 2
Saturday, 24 May (3:00 pm)	Norwood 1	def.	Victorian 0	Adelaide Oval (crowd: 1,500)
Only 1st Twenty fixture. Second Twenties Victorian vs Norwood on North Park Ground

=== Round 3 ===
	Round 3
Saturday, 31 May (3:30 pm)	South Adelaide 1	drew with	Port Adelaide 1	South Terrace (crowd: 1,500)
Saturday, 31 May (3:15 pm)	Adelaide 0	drew with	Victorian 0	Old Adelaide Ground (crowd: 550)
Saturday, 31 May (3:00 pm)	Kensington 0	def. by	South Park 1	Kensington Oval
	Bye; Norwood

=== Round 4 ===
	Round 4
Saturday, 7 June (3:01 pm)	Adelaide 0	def. by	Norwood 4	Adelaide Oval (crowd: 500)
Saturday, 7 June (3:30 pm)	South Adelaide 1	def.	South Park 0	South Terrace, Adelaide
Saturday, 7 June (3:20 pm)	Port Adelaide 1	def.	Victorian 0	Glanville Estate
	Bye; Kensington

=== Round 5 ===
	Round 5
Saturday, 14 June (3:15 pm)	Port Adelaide 1	def. by	Norwood 3	Glanville Estate (crowd: 1,000)
Saturday, 14 June (3:00 pm)	Victorian 0	drew with	South Park 0	Montefiore Hill (crowd: 500)
Saturday, 14 June	South Adelaide 1	def.	Kensington 0	Adelaide Oval
	Bye; Adelaide

=== Round 6 ===
	Round 6
Saturday, 21 June (3:30 pm)	Adelaide 1	drew with	Port Adelaide 1	Adelaide Oval
Saturday, 21 June (3:00 pm)	Victorian 3	def.	Kensington 0	Montefiore Hill

=== BYE ROUND - Saturday 28 June ===
SAFA representative First Twenty Team on interstate visit to Melbourne, Victoria to play the VFA. No 1st Twenty games were advertised by the SAFA. There were 3 second matches scheduled.

Non Association Match on 28 June at 3.30pm - West Torrens defeated South Adelaide 2-0 (Played On Victorian Ground with a fair attendance)

=== Round 7 ===
	Round 7
Saturday, 12 July (3:15 pm)	South Park 1	drew with	Adelaide 1	South Park Lands (crowd: 300)
Non Association Match on 12 July - Victorian defeated West Torrens 3-0 (Crowd 500); Saturday afternoon, July 12 - Port Adelaide - First v. Second Twenty; Port Adelaide footballers played a special match on the Queen and Albert Cricketing Oval (Alberton Oval) for the benefit of the Oval fund. The attendance was not large, the uncertainty of the weather doubtless being the cause. The match was between twenty of the first twenty against twenty eight of the second, and resulted in a victory for the twenty by three goals to nil. This was the first time a football match had been played on the Oval, and the ground, according to the expressed opinion of the players, was exceedingly good for the game. Alberton Oval would become Port Adelaide's home ground in 1880.

=== BYE ROUND (Saturday 19 July) ===
A series of special matches were played against Geelong the Premier Football Club from the Victoria Football Association.
July 19—Geelong v. Victorian. Won by Geelong by four goals 24 behinds to one behind.
July 21—Geelong v. Port. Geelong won by eight goals 26 behinds to one behind.
July 22—Geelong v. Norwood. Geelong won by three goals 19 behinds to 3 behinds.
July 24—Geelong v. S.A. Association. Geelong won by four goals 13 behinds to 1 goal 4 behinds.

=== Round 8 ===
	Round 8
Saturday, 26 July (3:30 pm)	Kensington 0	def. by	Norwood 7	Kensington Oval
Saturday, 26 July	South Park 1	def.	South Adelaide 0	South Park Lands
Saturday, 26 July	Port Adelaide 2	def.	Adelaide 0	Glanville Estate
	Bye; Victorian

=== Football Association and South Adelaide ===
The Football Association decided at its meeting on Tuesday 29 July 1879 that in the event of any of the other clubs objecting to meet the South Adelaides they would not forfeit the matches by so doing, but the games would be simply struck out of the list of those arranged for the season.

The decision had been arrived at on account of the alleged disgraceful way in which some of the South Adelaide players conducted themselves in their recent game with the South Parks.

=== Round 9 ===
	Round 9
Saturday, 2 August (3:00 pm)	Port Adelaide 2	def.	South Park 0	Glanville Estate
Saturday, 2 August (Time pm)	Kensington 0	def. by	Victorian 6	Kensington Oval
	Bye; Norwood
Saturday 2 August - Norwood played a Novel Football Match in Fancy Custom against Theatricals (Theature Royal Troupe) on Exhibition grounds.

=== Round 10 ===
	Round 10
Saturday, 9 August (3:15 pm)	Norwood 4.15 (4)	def.	Adelaide 0.1 (0)	East Park Lands (crowd: 400)
Saturday, 9 August	Victorian 0.2 (2)	def. by	Port Adelaide 1.2 (1)	Montefiore Hill (crowd: 750)
	Bye; South Adelaide
Advertised game - South Park vs Kensington postponed until Saturday, 20 September

=== Round 11 ===
	Round 11
Saturday, 16 August (3:20 pm)	Norwood 2.18 (2)	drew with	South Park 2.2 (2)	East Park Lands
Saturday, 16 August (3:30 pm)	Victorian 1	def.	Adelaide 0	Montefiore Hill (crowd: 300)
Saturday, 16 August (3:40 pm)	Kensington 0.5 (0)	def. by	South Adelaide 1.8 (1)	Kensington Oval
	Bye; Port Adelaide
Kensington v South Adelaide - another match report score was 0.6 to 1.7

=== Round 12 ===
	Round 12
Saturday, 23 August (3:15 pm)	Norwood 1.7 (1)	def.	Port Adelaide 0	East Park Lands (crowd: 3,000)
Saturday, 23 August (3:00 pm)	South Adelaide 2	def.	Victorian 0	South Park Lands
Saturday, 23 August	Adelaide 3	def.	Kensington 1	Old Adelaide Ground
	Bye; South Park
Advertised by SAFA - 1st Twenties - Adelaide vs Kensington on Adelaide Ground and 2nd Twenties Kensington v. Adelaide, on Kensington Oval. Matches to start at 3pm.

=== Round 13 ===
	Round 13
Saturday, 30 August (3:20 pm)	Victorian 0.3 (0)	def. by	Norwood 3.4 (3)	Montefiore Hill
Saturday, 30 August (3:20 pm)	Adelaide 0.4 (0)	def. by	South Park 4.8 (4)	Old Adelaide Ground
	Bye; Kensington
A game scheduled at Glanville Estate on Saturday, 30 August between Port Adelaide and South Adelaide was abandoned due to disagreement regarding the umpires selected.

=== Round 14 ===
	Round 14
Saturday, 6 September (3:15 pm)	South Park 0.2 (2)	def. by	Victorian 1.4 (1)	South Park Lands (crowd: 550)
	Bye; Norwood, Adelaide, South Adelaide
A game scheduled at Glanville Estate on Saturday, 6 September between Port Adelaide and Kensington was postponed due to illness amongst the Kensington players and the fact it was mail day.; On Sat 6 September starting at 3.30pm Norwood played a match against 25 juniors on the Norwood Ground. (Crowd 200) Norwood scored 4 goals and 25 behinds to the Juniors 2 behinds. The Junior team was made up of players from the North Park, Prince Alfred College and Woodville Clubs.; Eight players from St. Peter's College were selected to take part in the match, but they were ordered by the Head Master not to play. Mr C. W. Hughes from the Adelaide Club acted as the umpire.

=== Round 15 ===
	Round 15
Saturday, 13 September (3:00 pm)	South Park 0.0 (0)	def. by	Norwood 3.13 (3)	South Park Lands (crowd: 2,000)
The rescheduled advertised match between Port Adelaide and Kensington at Kensington Oval for Saturday, 13 September was forfeited in the priors favour due to the latter club unable to field a team.

=== Round 10 (Postponed Game) ===
	Round 10
Saturday, 20 September	South Park 0.17 (0)	drew with	Kensington 0.1 (0)	South Park Lands

== Ladder ==
1879 SAFA Ladder
	TEAM	P	W	L	D	GF	GA	Pts	Adj Pts
1	Norwood (P)	10	9	0	1	30	3	19	22.80
2	Port Adelaide	9	5	2	2	11	6	12	16.00
3	South Adelaide	7	4	2	1	6	4	9	15.42
4	Victorian	11	4	5	2	11	8	10	10.91
5	South Park	12	3	5	4	8	11	10	10.00
6	Adelaide	10	2	5	3	9	20	7	8.40
7	Kensington	9	0	8	1	4	27	1	1.33
Key: P = Played, W = Won, L = Lost, D = Drawn, GF = Goals For, GA = Goals Against, Pts = Points, Adj Pts = Points adjusted for match ratio, (P) = Premiers									

Notes:

- Following disputes between South Adelaide and other clubs, Adelaide (twice), Norwood, Port Adelaide, and Victorian (once each) all refused to play them: these five cancelled matches are not included in the above ladder.
- Kensington only played Norwood once, with their only scheduled match against Port Adelaide being forfeited due to a lack of players.
- Port Adelaide were ranked above South Adelaide on match ratio (only match was drawn), while Victorian were ranked above South Park (1-0-1) and South Park were ranked above Adelaide (1-0-1) on head-to-head record.

== Ladder - Second Twenty ==
1879 SAFA Ladder - Second Twenty
	TEAM	P	W	L	D	GF	GA	Pts	Adj Pts
1	South Adelaide (P)	9	6	0	3	?	?	15	20
=2	South Park	12	7	2	3	15	2	17	17
=2	Port Adelaide	12	7	2	3	6	3	17	17
4	Norwood	8	3	3	2	9	7	8	12
5	Victorian	11	4	4	3	8	11	11	12
6	Adelaide	5	1	2	2	?	?	4	9.6
7	Kensington	10	1	9	0	5	29	2	2.4
Key: P = Played, W = Won, L = Lost, D = Drawn, GF = Goals For, GA = Goals Against, Pts = Points, Adj Pts = Points adjusted for match ratio, (P) = Premiers									

Second Twenty Notes:
South Adelaide did not met Norwood or Adelaide two matches;
Norwood and Victorian each forfeited a game to Port Adelaide;
Adelaide forfeited five matches and Kensington two.

== Intercolonial matches ==
During July 1879, a team representing the South Australian Football Association toured Victoria, and played two intercolonial matches against a Victorian Association representative team; the first on a public holiday Tuesday, and the other on the following Saturday. The games were the first ever intercolonial matches between colony representative teams.

At an Association meeting held on 5 June 1879, the following players were selected for the first ever representative South Australian Team.
Adelaide — C. W. Hughes; Kensington— A. Harrison; Norwood — W. H. J. Dedman, A. McMichael, G.Giffen, J. Traynor, L. Suhard, E. Colbey, T. W. Green; Port—T. Smith; South Adelaide— A. Mehrtens, E. Absalom, K. Kennedy, M. Considine; South Park—A. M. Pettinger; Victorian— W. Knill, W. Osborn, C.E. Warren, W. Davis, G. E. Downs.
Emergency— W. Bracken (Norwood), S. M. Turner (Adelaide).

The South Australian side wore an all-blue uniform with SAFA in white on the cap. Due to commitments there was four replacements to the team, as Knill, Dedman, Waldron, and A. Mehrtens had to withdraw, that sailed for Melbourne on Wednesday 25 June 1879. Alfred McMichael from the Norwood Club, and formerly from Victoria, was selected as Captain.

	1879 Intercolonial Matches
Tuesday, 1 July	Victoria 7	def.	South Australia 0	East Melbourne Cricket Ground (crowd: 10,000)
Saturday, 5 July	Victoria 4	def.	South Australia 1	East Melbourne Cricket Ground (crowd: 6,000)
