= Victoria vs South Australia (1879) =

1879 Victoria v South Australia Intercolonial Series
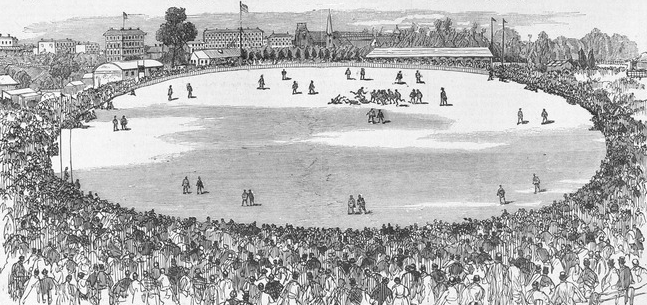
Victoria	South Australia
2	0
- Date: 1 July 1879 – 5 July 1879
- Stadium: East Melbourne Cricket Ground

The 1879 Victoria v South Australia involved a series of two matches with teams representing Victoria and South Australia. The matches were played in Victoria at the East Melbourne Cricket Ground. These two matches are recognised as the first games of intercolonial Australian rules football.

Colony	Football Association	Date Formed	Colours	Uniform	Captain
Victoria	VFA	17 May 1877		Red, white and blue guernseys, cap and hose and blue knickerbockers	John Gardiner
South Australia	SAFA	30 April 1877	All Blue	All blue, cap with SAFA.	Alfred McMichael

== Game 1 (1 July) ==
The first game was played on Tuesday 1st July 1879, which was observed as the Separation Day (now know as Victoria Day), celebrating Victoria’s 1851 independence from the Colony of New South Wales.

- Victoria def. South Australia (7.13 – 0.6).
- Venue – East Melbourne Cricket Ground.
- Attendance – 10,000.
- Umpire – James Slight.

=== Teams ===
Victoria		South Australia	
John Gardiner (captain)	Carlton	Alfred McMichael (captain)	Norwood
George Coulthard	Carlton	Robert Absalom	South Adelaide
Paddy Gunn	Carlton	Thomas Blinman	South Adelaide
George Miller	Essendon	William Bracken	Norwood
Herbert Bryant	Essendon	Edward Colbey	Norwood
William Goer	Carlton	Martin Considine	South Adelaide
Robert Sillett (Vice-Captain)	Melbourne	Richard Coonan	South Adelaide
Frank Lording	Hotham	W. Davis	Victorian (SAFA)
G.V. Cooke		George Downs	Victorian (SAFA)
Billy McLean	Hotham	George Giffen	Norwood
Harry Downes	Melbourne	Thomas Green	Norwood
Matthew Minchin	Albert Park	A.T. Harrison (Vice-Captain)	Kensington
Jimmy Robertson	Hotham	W. Hughes	Old Adelaide
Thomas		Kirk Kennedy	South Adelaide
J. Gibson	South Melbourne	Aldam Murr Pettinger	South Park
Arthur Ley	Hotham	Joseph Pollock	Norwood
Young	South Melbourne	Louis Suhard	Norwood
Murphy	Carlton	Joseph Traynor	Norwood
Rannard	West Melbourne	Turner	Old Adelaide
Mackenzie		Julian Woods	Norwood

Some players selected in the initial squad for South Australia were unable to make the trip to Victoria for the series. These players included Thomas Smith from Port Adelaide, A. Mehrtens from South Adelaide, W.H.J. Dedman from Norwood, W. Knill, W. Osborn and C.E. Warren all from the Victorians (SAFA) side.

== Game 2 (5 July) ==
The second game was played under the rules of the South Australia Football Association which were almost identical to that of the Victorian Football Association but for the allowance of high tackles. Called slinging at the time it involved a tackle around the neck and the player brought to the ground. Any form of high tackle is now banned in all codes of football.

- Result – Victoria def. South Australia (4–1).
- Venue – East Melbourne Cricket Ground
- Attendance – 8,000
- Umpire – Jas. Slight.

Victoria		South Australia	
John Gardiner (captain)	Carlton	Alfred McMichael (captain)	Norwood
George Coulthard	Carlton	Joseph Traynor	Norwood
Murphy	Carlton	Joseph Pollock	Norwood
Billy McLean	Hotham	Louis Suhard	Norwood
Rannard	West Melbourne	A.T. Harrison	Kensington
J. Gibson	South Melbourne		
Harry Downes	Melbourne		
G.V. Cooke			
Thomas			
Kirby	Ballarat		
McKenzie			
Cooper (IN)	Ballarat		

- Victoria team had two changes from the 1st game - two Ballarat Players were brought into the team as replacements for Bryant and Miller from Essendon who were playing at Geelong.
