= 1877 SAFA season =

1877 SAFA premiership season
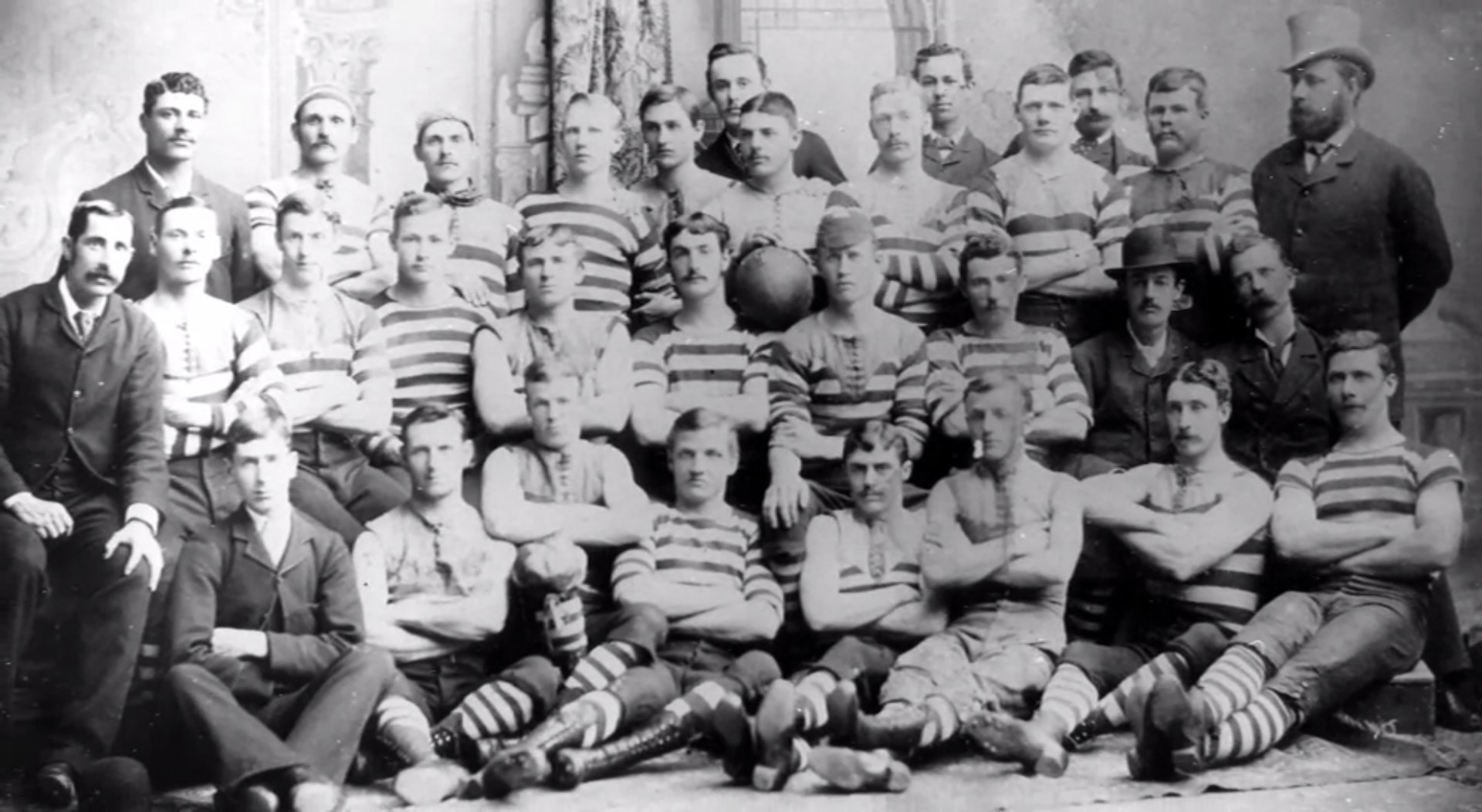
- South Adelaide premiership team
- Teams: 8
- Premiers: South Adelaide; Victorian (Joint Premiers); 1st premiership
- Leading goalkicker: John Young; Adelaide (14 goals)
- Matches played: 52 (61 scheduled)
- Highest: 650 (Round 7, Adelaide vs. South Adelaide)

The 1877 South Australian Football Association season was the inaugural season of the South Australian Football Association, the top-level league of Australian rules football in South Australia.

The clubs participating were Adelaide, Bankers, Kensington, Port Adelaide, South Adelaide, South Park, Victorian, Woodville.

South Adelaide and Victorian would share the premiership honours as there was no grand final playoff, while the Bankers Football Club, who finished last without a win and forfeited a number of games, folded before the end of the season.

Top Goalkickers for the season were:
(1) John Young (Adelaide) - 14 goals
(2) William (Billy) Dedman (South Adelaide) - 10 goals

== South Australian Football Association ==
The newly formed South Australian Football Association decided that the playing fields for the season must be between 180 and 200 yards (165-183m) long and 120-150 yards (110-137m) wide, with pushing from behind being prohibited. For clubs to gain membership of the association, they would need to pay two guineas for the year.

At a meeting on 14 May 1877 held at the Prince Alfred Hotel, the list of fixtures for the season was arranged by the match committee, and it was resolved that the Honorary Secretary advertise every Friday the matches for the following Saturday, and also that a tabulated card of the fixtures be printed for circulation.

== Inaugural Senior Clubs ==
Club	Colours	Home Ground	Captain	Membership
Adelaide	black, red	Old Adelaide Ground (North Park Lands)	R.E.N.Twoppeny	50
Bankers	White Blue	Shared with Adelaide - Old Adelaide Ground	Mr Cotton; A. Crooks	50
Kensington	Scarlet white	Kensington Oval	P.Wood	65
Port Adelaide	Magneta	Glanville Hall Estate	W. Fletcher	85
South Adelaide	Navy Blue White	South Terrace, Adelaide	G.D.Kennedy	85
South Park	Light Blue White	South Park Lands, Adelaide	J.H.Sinclair	56
Victorian	Orange Black	Montefiore Hill, North Adelaide	G.E.Downs	76
Woodville	Dark Blue	Woodville	J.R.Osborne	

== Premiership Season ==
=== Round 1 ===
	Round 1
Saturday, 12 May (2:45 pm)	Adelaide 4	def.	Bankers 1	Old Adelaide Ground
Saturday, 12 May (3:30 pm)	Kensington 0	def. by	Port Adelaide 3	Kensington Oval
The advertised first game between Adelaide and Bankers was scheduled for 5 May but was postponed due to the weather.

FOOTBALL. — ADELAIDES V. BANKERS will be played on the Old Adelaide Ground, near the Adelaide Bridge, Tomorrow (Saturday), May 5. Play will commence at 2.30 sharp. Adelaides in colored, Bankers in white jerseys.

Teams for the first games played on 12 May were advertised on the day as follows:
Football matches will be played this afternoon between the Kensington and Port Adelaide clubs on the Kensington Oval, and Adelaide v. Bankers on the Adelaide ground, North Park Lands. A color match will also be played on the grounds of the South Park Club.
The names of the Adelaide Club players are Messrs. M. Acraman, F. A. Bleechmore, G. Butterworth, W. Cate, Canaway, W. E. Dalton, A.Fesenmeyer, H. and C. Hughes, Morgan, Poole, A. and D. C.Scott, R. N.Twopeny, Wyatt, and Jas, Jno., and E. B. Young.

The players in the match between the Port Adelaide and Kensington Clubs are:—
Port Adelaide — Messrs. E. Ede, W. Fletcher, J, S. Hawkes, W. Kelly, A. LeMessurier, J. A. Rann, H. Fletcher, J. Sidoli, A. Pickhaver, T. Wildrew, H. Dewar, T. Prideaux, F.Dewar, A. Dewar, F. A. Colman, T. Smith, D.Kettie, Et. LeMessurier, A. Wald, and Ed. LeMessurier, with W. Bennett, T. C. Neill, and W. Pyne, as emergency men.
Kensington — Messrs. E.Woods, J. Woods, H. Goode, W. Day, F. Day, A. Frew, T. Burton, F. G. Stanton, P. Wood, C.A. Patterson, W. Gwynne, H. Muirhead, T.Pope, H. Stanton, A. Harrison, B. Hall, A. M. Hargrave, and Moulden, with C. T. Hargrave, H. W. Hargrave, J. Thomas, and T. James, as emergency men.

12 May - South Park played an internal colour match (Blue vs White) on South Park Lands.

=== Round 2 ===
	Round 2
Saturday, 19 May (3:15 pm)	Adelaide 3	def.	Port Adelaide 2	Old Adelaide Ground (crowd: 250)
Saturday, 19 May	South Park 1	def.	Bankers 0	South Park Lands
Games were advertised to start at 2.30pm. The Old Adelaide Ground (Central Park) is refer to also being near the Adelaide Bridge. The death of C. B Poole (Bankers) occurred as a result of injuries sustained in the South Park v Bankers game.

=== Round 3 ===
	Round 3
Saturday, 26 May (3:15 pm)	Adelaide 1	def.	Woodville 0	Old Adelaide Ground
Saturday, 26 May (3:00 pm)	Kensington 1	def.	South Park 0	Kensington Oval
Saturday, 26 May	Victorian 1	def.	Port Adelaide 0	Montefiore Hill
Adelaide played a game at Kapunda on Thursday 24 May and returned via Train to Adelaide on Friday morning. On the Saturday 8 players had withdrawn from the team leaving them to only field 18 (including their Captain who was injured), whilst Woodville had a full team of 20. It was reported that the Ground was underwater but Woodville were still keen to play. Non Association Matches Played against Country Clubs on the Holiday; Thursday 24 May - Adelaide, 4 goals, beat Kapunda, 2. Thursday 24 May - Woodville, 1 goal, beat Gawler, 0. Thursday 24 May - Port Adelaide played a colour match at Glanville. Play starting at 9.30am.

=== Round 4 ===
	Round 4
Saturday, 2 June	Kensington 0	def. by	South Adelaide 2	Kensington Oval
Saturday, 2 June (3:00 pm)	Woodville 0	def. by	Victorian 3	Woodville
Saturday, 2 June	Adelaide 2	def.	South Park 0	Old Adelaide Ground
Saturday, 2 June	Port Adelaide 3	def.	Bankers 0	Glanville

=== Round 5 ===
	Round 5
Saturday, 9 June (3:15 pm)	Kensington 0	drew with	Adelaide 0	Kensington Oval
Saturday, 9 June (3:45 pm)	Woodville 0	def. by	South Adelaide 1 *	Woodville
Saturday, 9 June	Victorian 2	def.	South Park 0	Montefiore Hill
This result was originally reported as a 0-0 draw due to a goal umpire not allowing a goal scored by a South Adelaide player running on after taking a mark. The Victorians all appeared in costume, which consisted of a black guernsey with yellow facings, and cap of the same color, which presented a marked contrast to their opponent - South Park white and light blue uniforms; Port Adelaide played a colour match at Glanville

=== Round 6 ===
	Round 6
Saturday, 16 June	Adelaide 1	drew with	Victorian 1	Old Adelaide Ground
Saturday, 16 June	South Park 0	def. by	Woodville 2	South Park Lands
Saturday, 16 June (3:15 pm)	Port Adelaide 4	def.	Kensington 0	Glanville
South Park vs Woodville - both teams played with only 14 players; The advertised game between Bankers and South Adelaide scheduled for 16 June at South Adelaide Ground was awarded to South Adelaide on forfeit as only 13 Bankers players appeared.

=== Round 7 ===
	Round 7
Saturday, 23 June (3:00 pm)	Adelaide 0	def. by	South Adelaide 1	Old Adelaide Ground (crowd: 650)
Saturday, 23 June (3:15 pm)	Port Adelaide 1	drew with	Woodville 1	Glanville
Saturday, 23 June	Victorian 7	def.	Bankers 0	Montefiore Hill
Saturday, 23 June (3:00 pm)	Kensington 0	def. by	South Park 2	Kensington Oval

=== Round 8 ===
	Round 8
Saturday, 30 June	South Adelaide 0	drew with	Victorian 0	South Park Lands (crowd: 650)
Saturday, 30 June (3:00 pm)	Port Adelaide 1	def.	South Park 0	Glanville
Adelaide Club advertised a practice match at its home ground starting at 2.30pm

=== Round 9 ===
	Round 9
Saturday, 7 July (3:15 pm)	Adelaide 9	def.	Bankers 0	Old Adelaide Ground
Saturday, 7 July (3:15 pm)	South Adelaide 0	drew with	Woodville 0	South Park Lands
Saturday, 7 July (3:15 pm)	Victorian 3	def.	Kensington 0	Montefiore Hill

=== Round 10 ===
	Round 10
Saturday, 14 July (3:00 pm)	Woodville 1	def. by	South Park 2	Woodville
Saturday, 14 July (3:15 pm)	Port Adelaide 1	drew with	Adelaide 1	Glanville
Saturday, 14 July (Time pm)	Bankers 1	def. by	Kensington 4	Old Adelaide Ground
Colours - Bankers (Blue) - Captain Crooks. Kensington (Red) - Captain Peterwood. When the Bankers score their goal it was described in the match report as follows - The Bankers, who have been patiently waiting since the beginning of the season for a chance to open an account, now brought the ball down with a will, and Edwards with a splendid kick landed the ball through the Kensington goal amidst a hurricane of cheers. However, the first match report of the season against Adelaide it was reported that the Banker's had scored a goal in that game too.

.

=== Round 11 ===
	Round 11
Saturday, 21 July (3:15 pm)	South Adelaide 3	def.	Port Adelaide 0	South Tce, South Adelaide Ground
Saturday, 21 July	Kensington 3	def. by	Woodville 8	Kensington Oval
Saturday, 21 July (3:15 pm)	Adelaide 2	def.	South Park 1	Old Adelaide Ground
Saturday, 21 July (3:00 pm)	Victorian 5	def.	Bankers 1	Montefiore Hill
Colours - Victorian orange and black, Bankers blue and white

=== Round 12 ===
	Round 12
Saturday, 28 July (3:30 pm)	Adelaide 2	def.	Woodville 0	Old Adelaide Ground (crowd: 500)
Saturday, 28 July (3:10 pm)	Port Adelaide 2	def.	Victorian 1	Glanville
Saturday, 28 July (3:30 pm)	South Adelaide 7	def.	Kensington 0	South Tce, South Adelaide Ground
Saturday, 28 July (3:00 pm)	South Park 3	def.	Bankers 0	South Park Lands
The game against South Park would be the Bankers last game as a club.

=== Round 13 ===
	Round 13
Saturday, 4 August (3:00 pm)	Victorian 2	def.	Adelaide 0	Montefiore Hill
Saturday, 4 August (3:20 pm)	Port Adelaide 0	def. by	South Adelaide 1	Glanville (crowd: 500)
Saturday, 4 August	South Park 1	drew with	Kensington 1	South Park Lands
Woodville and Bankers. Bankers forfeited.

=== Round 14 ===
	Round 14
Saturday, 11 August (3:00 pm)	Woodville 0	def. by	South Park 5	Woodville
Saturday, 11 August (3:00 pm)	Adelaide 6	def.	Kensington 2	Old Adelaide Ground
A game scheduled between Port Adelaide and the Bankers at Montefiore Hill was awarded to Port Adelaide on forfeit: Port had a full team on the field when the Bankers' captain informed them and the umpire that the Bankers were unable to field a team.; Teams were affected due to their star players involvement in a combined SAFA team (with players picked from Victorian, Woodville, South Park and Port Adelaide Clubs) vs. Melbourne game being played at the Exhibition Grounds simultaneously: Melbourne defeated the combined team by five goals to nil.

=== Round 15 ===
	Round 15
Saturday, 25 August (3:15 pm)	Victorian 2	v	Woodville 0	Montefiore Hill
Saturday, 25 August	South Park 0	def. by	South Adelaide 4	South Park Lands
The Victorians were short of two of their players — Messrs. Barry and Kingsford — while the Woodvilles, besides being; greatly weakened by the retirement of their late captain and several first-class men, were playing with seven of their second twenty.

=== Round 16 ===
	Round 16
Saturday, 1 September (3:15 pm)	South Adelaide 2	def.	Adelaide 0	South Park Lands (crowd: 400)
Saturday, 1 September	Port Adelaide 2	def.	South Park 1	Glanville
Saturday, 1 September	Woodville 3	def.	Kensington 0	Woodville
Captains, Woodville Messrs. Warren and Kensington P. Wood.

=== Round 17 ===
	Round 17
Saturday, 8 September	South Adelaide 1	def.	South Park 0	South Park Lands (crowd: 500)
Saturday, 8 September (3:45 pm)	Kensington 1	v	Victorian 2	Kensington Oval
Woodvilles v. Ports. A match between these Clubs was arranged to take place at Woodville on Saturday, 8 September; but the Woodvilles were unable to raise a team, so the match was postponed until Saturday, 15 September, when the Ports were again disappointed by the Woodvilles not turning out.

=== Round 18 ===
	Round 18
Saturday, 15 September	South Park 0	drew with	Victorian 0	South Park Lands
Victorian claimed they had won the game, but a South Park protest was upheld and the game's single goal was annulled. The match was noted as the roughest of the season. The result being declared a draw following a motion being carried at an Association meeting on Friday 5 October.; A game was scheduled for September 15 between Port Adelaide and Woodville at Woodville was awarded to Port Adelaide as Woodville forfeited due to a lack of players (their principal players being involved in a practice cricket match at Norwood).; A game was scheduled for September 15 between Adelaide and Bankers at Adelaide's Ground. However, Bankers as announced will not meet Adelaide.

=== Round 19 (Postponed) ===
FOOTBALL ASSOCIATION MATCHES for SATURDAY, 22 September.
At Montefiore — Victorian v. South Adelaide.
At South Park— Port v. South Park
Football. — Two Association matches are announced for today one between the Port Adelaide and South Park Clubs on the ground of the latter, and the other between the Victorian and South Adelaide Clubs at Montefiore Hill. The latter match will decide the question of the championship of the season, and will, it is to be hoped, be largely attended, as a hat is to be passed round at half-time for the benefit of the sufferers by the Indian famine.

In consequence of the inclement weather on Saturday, 22 September, the football matches which were to have been played between the South Adelaide and Victorian Clubs and the Port Adelaide and South Park Clubs were postponed.

=== Round 19 ===
	Round 19
Saturday, 29 September (3:30 pm)	South Park 1	def. by	Port Adelaide 3	South Park Lands
Saturday, 29 September (3:15 pm)	Victorian 1	def.	South Adelaide 0	Montefiore Hill
The duties of field-umpire were most efficiently and impartially performed by Mr. J.R. Osborne (ex Woodville Captain). At one time a quarrel nearly arose, but it was promptly put down by the captains. Messrs. Giffen and Smart were goal-umpires. It was reported that the following players will take part in the game: South Adelaides — Messrs. G. Kennedy (Captain), Mehrtens (Vice), Absalom, Blinman, Colbey, Curtis, Coonan, Dedman, Jones, Kennedy, Kingston, Mehrtens, Reid, Stacey, Shaw, Sellars, Thompson, Toll, Wallace, Woolridge. Emergency — Sketheway, Sharp, Simmonds, and Argall. Victorians— Atkinson, Colley, Downs (Captain), Davies (2), Furnell, Frayne, Fiveash, Hall, Knill, Kingsfold, Lammey, Murray, Miller, Osborn, Stratton, Sharp, Warren, Furnell, and Salsberg. Emergency man — Miller. His Excellency the Administrator of the Government and His Worship the Mayor have given their patronage for the occasion.

Earlier in the season the teams played a scoreless drew at South's home ground. Victorians had only lost one game which was against Port Adelaide. South Adelaide was widely regarded as the best club in the competition during the course of the season. However, their lossless streak ended in the final game of the season. South Adelaide lost to Victorian, giving the two clubs an equal record of only losing one game.

=== Summary of matches Metro Clubs vs Country Clubs ===
Thursday 24 May (Public Holiday)
Adelaide, 4 goals defeated Kapunda 2 goals at Kapunda (An oval ball was used).
Woodville 1 goal defeated Gawler 0 at Gawler.
Woodville Team - Woodville team : J. R. Osborne, C.Formby, A. Formby, F. Terrell, C. Doran, J.Atkins, W. Terrell, Kauffmann, S. McPherson, Bennett, Reeves, Dennis, A. Quin, T. Letchford, J. Clark, Jones, A. Young, J. Darby, Nash, T. Bickers, H. Page, and A. Terrell.

Wednesday 21 June (Public Holiday) - Adelaide 1 goal drew with Gawler 1. Crowd 450 at Gawler

Monday 6 August Adelaide (colours Red and Black) 3 goals defeated Kapunda (Colour Blue) 2 goals at South Adelaide's Ground

=== Summary of other Matches ===
Monday 6 August South Australians 3 goals defeated Victorians 1 goal. Played at Exhibition Ground. (Crowd 500 + 200 non paying)

=== Intercolonial Association Matches ===
The proposed inaugural inter-colonial match between Associations was cancelled because the venue owners Melbourne University refused to allow admission fees to be charged. The match was then proposed to be moved to the Civil Service Cricket Ground, located at Flinders Park (near the current site of Rod Laver Arena). However, a suitable date could not be agreed upon as the SAFA wanted July 14 and the VFA July 21 therefore the match was cancelled.

Saturday 11 August Melbourne Football Club 1 goal defeated Victorian 0. Crowd: 2000 at Exhibition Grounds, Adelaide
Monday 13 August Melbourne Football Club, 5 goals defeated South Australian Combined Team, 0. Crowd: 1000 at Exhibition Grounds, Adelaide
The combined team comprised players selected from the following local Clubs:
Victorians, G. Downs (Captain of the South Australian combatants), C. Warren, H.Barry, Knill, Kingsford, W. Lanjmey, H. Allen, and J. Sharp;
Ports, T. Smith, A. LeMessurier, Fletcher, W. Frideaux, and Tysack;
Woodvilles, T. Beeves, Letchford, G. Giffen, Aitken, and J. R. Osborne;
South Parks, J. M. Sinclair and Cresswell.

Saturday 18 August - St Kilda Football Club 5 goals, defeated Adelaide 2 goals. Crowd 3500 at Adelaide Oval
Monday 20 August - St Kilda Football Club 7 goals defeated South Australians 2 goals at Adelaide Oval.

== Ladder ==
It was declared South Adelaide and Victorian would be deemed joint Champion Club (premiers). which was also acknowledged by South Adelaide at their Annual Dinner on evening of Tuesday 2 October.

1877 SAFA Ladder
	TEAM	P	W	L	D	PF	PA	PTS	Adj Pts
1	South Adelaide (P)	13	10	1	2	22	1	22	28.77
1	Victorian (P)	14	10	1	3	30	5	23	27.93
3	Adelaide	17	11	3	3	31	13	25	25.00
4	Port Adelaide	15	9	4	2	23	13	20	22.67
5	Woodville	16	5	9	2	14	18	12	12.75
6	South Park	17	5	10	2	16	23	12	12.00
7	Kensington	15	3	10	2	12	43	8	9.07
8	Bankers	15	0	15	0	4	36	0	0.00
Key: P = Played, W = Won, L = Lost, D = Drawn, PF = Points For, PA = Points Against, Adj Pts = Points adjusted for match ratio, (P) = Premiers									

Note: Woodville were ranked above South Park on head-to-head record (2-1). Two out of their five wins were a result of forfeits by Bankers.
It was reported at the end of the season that Bankers had forfeited 6 out of their 15 games. (Adelaide, Port Adelaide, South Adelaide, Kensington 1 each, and Woodville 2)

Victorian finished the season with eight more goals but a slightly inferior record than South Adelaide, but one should consider that Victorian played the Bankers twice whereas South Adelaide did not (their only scheduled match, in Round 6, was a forfeit when the Bankers could only muster 13 players). Further, while Adelaide finished with one more win than the other two clubs, they played 17 games to 13 and 14 respectively.

=== Top 4 Head to Head Results ===
Home \ Away	SA	VIC	ADL	PA
South Adelaide		0–0	2–0	3–0
Victorians	1–0		2–0	1–0
Adelaide	0–1	1–1		3–2
Port Adelaide	0–1	2–1	1–1	

Legend: Blue = home team win; Yellow = draw; Red = away team win.

== Closing Matches ==
Victorian Football Club closed their season on Saturday 13 October with a Ladies Bag Match played below Montefiore Hill.
