= 1878 SAFA season =

1878 SAFA premiership season
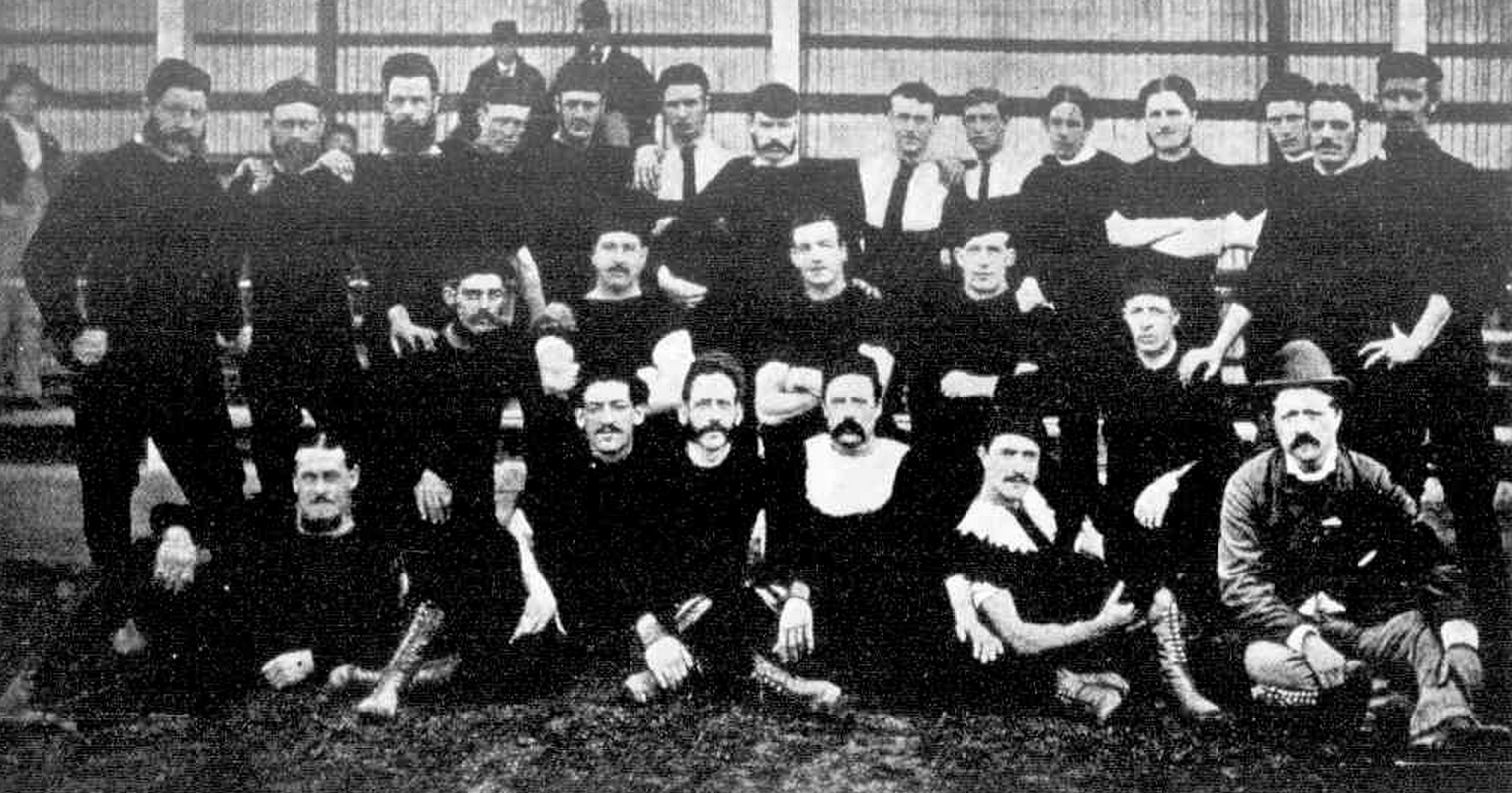
- Norwood premiership team
- Teams: 7
- Premiers: Norwood; 1st premiership
- Leading goalkicker: William Dedman; Norwood (12 Goals)
- Matches played: 40
- Highest: 3,000 (Round 13, Norwood vs Port Adelaide)

The 1878 South Australian Football Association season was the 2nd season of the top-level Australian rules football competition in South Australia.

In its first season, Norwood won the premiership, going through the year undefeated - 8 wins and 4 draws.

The SAFA competition was contested by seven teams with the admission of newly formed club Norwood, after Bankers and Woodville folded at the end of 1877.

Each team of twenty men were scheduled to play each other twice this season, the first time a standardised fixture was in place. Clubs also fielded second twentys and these games were also advertised on a weekly basis along with the first twenty games.

== Preseason ==
The SAFA clubs played inter club matches on 4 May.

An additional pre season game was played between some South Australian and Victorian residents who live in Adelaide.

	South Australian vs. Victorian residents
Saturday, 11 May (Time pm)	South Australians 1	def.	Victorians 0	Adelaide Oval (crowd: 350)
Captains - J.Mehrtens (South Australians), G. Kennedy (Victorians). Umpire - A. Crooks. Funds raised for Adelaide Hospital.

== SAFA Senior Clubs 1878 Season ==
Club	Colours	Home Ground	Captain	Comments
Adelaide	Black, Red	Old Adelaide Ground, North Adelaide	Dalton; W.A.Hughes	Played majority of home games at Adelaide Oval
Kensington	Scarlet White	Kensington Oval	Milne	
Norwood	Dark blue Red	East Park Lands, Adelaide	J.R.Osborne	New club formed from leading players from Woodville
Port Adelaide	Magneta White	Glanville Hall Estate	W. Fletcher	
South Adelaide	Navy Blue White	South Terrace, Adelaide	G.D.Kennedy	
South Park	Light Blue White	South Park Lands, Adelaide	J.H.Sinclair	
Victorian	Orange Black	Montefiore Hill, North Adelaide	G.E.Downs	

Premiership matches are those that took place after 11 May.

=== Round 1 ===
	Round 1
Saturday, 18 May (3:15 pm)	Norwood 1	def.	South Adelaide 0	Adelaide Oval (crowd: 800)
Saturday, 18 May (3:15 pm)	South Park 0	def. by	Port Adelaide 2	South Park Lands
Saturday, 18 May (3:00 pm)	Kensington 0	def. by	Adelaide 5	Kensington Oval
	Bye; Victorian

=== Round 2 ===
	Round 2
Saturday, 25 May (3:45 pm)	Norwood 1	def.	Victorian 0	East Park Lands (crowd: 500)
Saturday, 25 May (3:40 pm)	Adelaide 1	def.	South Adelaide 0	Adelaide Oval
Saturday, 25 May (3:00 pm)	Kensington 0	def. by	Port Adelaide 4	Kensington Oval
	Bye; South Park
Non Competition Match - Monday 27th May was Queen's Birthday Holiday. Norwood (with a strong team) visited Gawler - Winning 7 goals to 1.

=== Round 3 ===
	Round 3
Saturday, 1 June (3:25 pm)	South Adelaide 0	def. by	Port Adelaide 1	South Park Lands (crowd: 300)
Saturday, 1 June (3:30 pm)	Kensington 0	def. by	South Parks 1	Kensington Oval
Saturday, 1 June (3:00 pm)	Adelaide 2	drew with	Victorians 2	Adelaide Oval
The South Adelaide vs. Port Adelaide game was ended early due to the interference of rowdy larrikins.

=== Round 4 ===
	Round 4
Saturday, 8 June (Time pm)	Adelaide 0	def. by	Norwood 1	Adelaide Oval
Saturday, 8 June (3:00 pm)	South Adelaide 1	v	South Parks 0	South Park Lands
The Port Adelaide vs. Victorian game was called off due to bad weather and rescheduled for 6 July despite Port kicking a goal.

=== Round 5 ===
	Round 5
Saturday, 15 June (3:15 pm)	South Adelaide 2	def.	Kensington 0	South Park Lands
Saturday, 15 June (Time pm)	Victorians 3	def.	South Parks 0	Montefiore Hill
Saturday, 15 June (Time pm)	Port Adelaide 0	def. by	Norwood 1	Glanville Estate (crowd: 600)

=== Round 6 ===
	Round 6
Saturday, 22 June (3:00 pm)	South Parks 0	drew with	Norwood 0	Park Lands, South Tce (crowd: 600)
Saturday, 22 June (3:00 pm)	Port Adelaide 2	def.	Adelaide 0	Glanville Estate (crowd: 300)
Saturday, 22 June (3:45 pm)	Kensington 0	drew with	Victorians 0	Kensington Oval

=== Round 7 ===
	Round 7
Saturday, 29 June (3:00 pm)	Victorians 1	def.	South Adelaide 0	Montefiore Hill (crowd: 1,100)
Saturday, 29 June (3:15 pm)	South Park 0	drew with	Adelaide 0	South Park Lands
Norwood advertised a full practice match on their ground in the afternoon.<

=== Round 8 ===
	Round 8
Saturday, 6 July (Time pm)	Norwood 6	def.	Kensington 0	East Park Lands (crowd: 300)
Saturday, 6 July (3:15 pm)	Port Adelaide 1	drew with	Victorian 1	Glanville Estate
The Victorian Club visited Glanville on Saturday afternoon, July 6, to play off their match of Saturday, June 8. with the Port Club, which was postponed, after the Ports had obtained one goal, owing to the unfavorable state of the weather.

=== Round 9 ===
	Round 9
Saturday, 13 July (Time pm)	Kensington 0	drew with	Norwood 0	Kensington Oval
Saturday, 13 July (3:15 pm)	Adelaide 0	drew with	Port Adelaide 0	Old Adelaide Ground
Saturday, 13 July (Time pm)	South Park 0	def. by	South Adelaide 1	South Park Lands
FIXTURES ADVERTISED FOR JULY 13, Commencing at 2.45 p.m. sharp. FIRST TWENTIES. South Park v. South Adelaide, on South Park Lands. Kensington v. Norwood, on Kensington Oval. Adelaide v. Port, on North Park Lands. SECOND TWENTIES. Kensington v. South Adelaide, at South terrace east. Norwoods v. Port, at Glanville. South Park v. Victorian, at Montefiore Hill

=== Round 10 ===
	Round 10
Saturday, 20 July (3:00 pm)	South Adelaide 0	drew with	Adelaide 0	South Park Lands (crowd: 600)
Saturday, 20 July (3:15 pm)	Port Adelaide 2	def.	South Park 0	Glanville Estate
Saturday, 20 July (3:30 pm)	Victorian 1	def.	Kensington 0	Montefiore Hill

=== Round 11 ===
	Round 11
Saturday, 27 July (3:30 pm)	South Adelaide 0	drew with	Norwood 0	South Park Lands (crowd: 700)
Saturday, 27 July (3:00 pm)	Victorian 0	drew with	Port Adelaide 0	Montefiore Hill (crowd: 500)
Saturday, 27 July (3:35 pm)	South Park 0	drew with	Kensington 0	South Park Lands

=== Round 12 ===
	Round 12
Saturday, 3 August (Time pm)	Norwood 4	def.	South Park 1	East Park Lands (crowd: 800)
Saturday, 3 August (Time pm)	Victorian 2	def.	Adelaide 0	Montefiore Hill
Saturday, 3 August (3:45 pm)	Kensington 0	def. by	South Adelaide 2	Kensington Oval

=== Round 13 ===
	Round 13
Saturday, 10 August (3:00 pm)	Norwood 0	drew with	Port Adelaide 0	East Park Lands (crowd: 3,000)
Saturday, 10 August (Time pm)	Adelaide 4	v	Kensington 1	Adelaide Oval

=== Round 14 ===
	Round 14
Saturday, 17 August (Time pm)	Adelaide 1	v	South Parks 0	Adelaide Oval
Saturday, 17 August (Time pm)	Port Adelaide 0	def. by	South Adelaide 1	Glanville Estate (crowd: 300)
Victorian was on a tour of Victoria between 17th and 24th August.

=== Round 15 ===
	Round 15
Saturday, 24 August (Time pm)	Norwood 1	def.	Adelaide 0	East Park Lands (crowd: 700)
Victorian was on a tour of Victoria between 17th and 24th August.

=== Round 16 ===
	Round 16
Saturday, 31 August (3:00 pm)	South Adelaide 1	def.	Victorian 0	South Terrace (crowd: 1,200)
South Adelaide scored the first goal of the match; Victorians then kicked a goal, but it was deleted after a head count revealed they had 21 men on the ground at the time. The mistake occurred when they took on two substitutes at the start of the game and one of their players Knill arrived late. After the headcount and the dispute which followed, which lasted half an hour, Knill was removed from the field and play continued.; At a South Australian Football Association Committee meeting held on evening of 6th September 1878 it was decided that the match played between the South Adelaide and Victorian Clubs last Saturday should be declared a win for the former.

=== Round 17 ===
	Round 17
Saturday, 7 September (3:30 pm)	Victorian 0	def. by	Norwood 1	Montefiore Hill (crowd: 2,750)

=== 1878 SAFA Home and Away Season ===
Home \ Away	NOR	PAD	VIC	SAD	ADL	SPK	KEN
Norwood		0–0	1–0	1–0	1–0	4–1	6–0
Port Adelaide	0–1		1–1	0–1	2–0	2–0	
Victorian	0–1	0–0		1–0	2–0	3–0	1–0
South Adelaide	0–0	0–1	1–0		0–0	1–0	2–0
Adelaide	0–1	0–0	2–2	1–0		1–0	4–1
South Park	0–0	0–2		0–1	0–0		0–0
Kensington	0–0	0–4	0–0	0–2	0–5	0–1	

Legend: Blue = home team win; Yellow = draw; Red = away team win.

== Ladder ==
1878 SAFA Ladder
	TEAM	P	W	L	D	GF	GA	Pts	Adj Pts
1	Norwood (P)	12	8	0	4	16	1	20	20.00
2	Port Adelaide	11	5	2	4	13	4	14	15.27
3	South Adelaide	12	6	4	2	8	4	14	14.00
4	Victorian	11	4	3	4	10	6	12	13.09
5	Adelaide	12	4	4	4	14	10	12	12.00
6	South Park	11	1	7	3	2	14	5	5.45
7	Kensington	11	0	8	3	1	25	3	3.00
Key: P = Played, W = Won, L = Lost, D = Drawn, GF = Goals For, GA = Goals Against, Pts = Points, Adj Pts = Points adjusted for match ratio, (P) = Premiers									

Notes: Port Adelaide and Kensington and Victorian and South Park did not play return matches.

=== 1878 Norwood Club Song ===
==== Men of Norwood ====
All who love the noble game, hear the story I proclaim;
How the Norwoods earned their fame [How they won their glory].
First, against the Souths so strong, Cheers went up, both loud and long;
Forward! Norwoods, red and blue. Fair ones' smiles encourage you.

Chorus
Cheer the bonny red and blue,
Cheer the colours fast and true,
Keep their colours still in view,
Forward! Men of Norwood.

Who will e'er forget that day, Sturdy Mac led on the play,
Giffen dashing through the fray, Kicked first goal for Norwood
And from thousand throats that cried, Cleft the air up to the skies.
Forward! Norwood, red and blue. Fair ones' eyes are watching you.

(Chorus)

When they met the sprightly Vics, With their little marks and tricks,
People thought would be a fix, Too much for the Norwoods.
Like the Souths the Vics were licked, Traynor for us one goals kicked.
Forward! Norwoods, red and blue, Wiry Vics you did subdue.

(Chorus)

Sturdy Ports and Adelaides, Little Parks [those knowing blades]
Kensingtons, who love the maids, All succumbed to Norwood.
So the first year passed away, And our men still held the sway;

Forward! Norwood, red and blue, Beauty's lips are praising you.

— Arthur Diamond, Secretary and Treasurer of the Norwood Club to the tune of 'Killarney'

== Adelaide Metro (SAFA) vs Country (Gawler, Kapunda, Willunga) ==
A match was played on Saturday afternoon, August 31, on the Adelaide ground, between a combined team of the South Australian Football Association and a picked team from the Gawler, Kapunda, and Willunga Country Clubs. Crowd - 600 to 700. Result - Metro 5 goals defeated Country 1.

The following were the players for the combined Association team:
T. Smith, F. Stacey, W. Morgan, H. Meyer, H. Wyatt, Gibbs, W. A. Hughes (captain), T. Carter, S. M. Turner, H. Fletcher, C. Parker, H. Burnet, Terry, Woods, Waterhouse, Acraman (2), Suhard, Pettinger (vice-captain), T. Blinman, and Palmer.
Combined Country team players:
Kapunda - E. Brady, D. Cameron, Fisher, J. McLaren, M. McCarthy, J. S. Pearce and C. Rebbeck.
Gawler - Bright, Couch, Donnell, Tardif and Thomson.
Willunga - H. Allen, Dawe, Goss, Martin, Maverley and Richards.
Colley and G.Goodfellow played as substitutes in the absence of Hall and Hezeltine.

== Senior Club other matches ==
Some of the Adelaide Metro Clubs took their annual trips into the country.
Norwood defeated the Gawler seven goals to one;
Adelaide and Gawler, two goals each, played a draw;
Kensington scored two goals to Kapunda one;
South Parks beat Riverton three goals to nil, and were defeated by Willunga two goals to one. (Thu 20 June 1878)

The Victorian SAFA club based at North Adelaide undertook an interstate trip to Victoria in August 1878.
Results:
17 August, Melbourne 1.23 (1) d. Victorian (SAFA) 0.1 (0)
19 August, Melbourne 2.13 (2) d. Victorian (SAFA) 0.4 (0)
21 August, Geelong Geelong 6.26 (6) d. Victorian (SAFA) 0.0 (0)
24 August, Victorian (SAFA) 1.2 (1) d. Ballarat 0.15 (0)

== Ladder - Second Twenty ==
1878 SAFA Ladder - Second Twenty
	TEAM	P	W	L	D	Pts	Comments
1	South Adelaide (P)	12	9	0	3	21	Undefeated. Drew against Port and Victorian
2	Port Adelaide	12	9	1	2	20	One lost to South Adelaide, Draws against South and Victorians.
3	Victorian	11	5	3	3	13	Didn't play last fixture against Kensington
4	South Park	12	4	4	4	12	
5	Norwood	12	4	6	2	10	
6	Kensington	11	2	7	2	6	Didn't play last fixture against Victorian
7	Adelaide	12	0	12	0	0	One lost. Forfeited the other eleven matches
Key: P = Played, W = Won, L = Lost, D = Drawn, Pts = Points, (P) = Premiers							
