= 1874 South Australian football season =

1874 South Australian football premiership season
- Premiers: Kensington; 2nd premiership

The 1874 South Australian football season was the sixth year of interclub football in South Australia. Prior to the establishment of the South Australian Football Association (SAFA) in April 1877, the football season was largely a series of independent club matches and challenge games rather than an organized league season. The unaffiliated era was from 1869 to 1876.

== Major Clubs ==
=== Metropolitan ===
- Adelaide
- Kensington
- Port Adelaide
- Victorian (Based at foot of Montefiore Hill, North Adelaide)

=== Country Clubs ===
- Gawler
- Willunga

=== Colleges ===
- Adelaide Educational Institution
- Prince Alfred College
- St Peter's College

Notes - The J.L. Young School building (Adelaide Educational Institution) was situated about a quarter of a mile south of the angle formed by the junction of the Glen Osmond Road and that forming the principal frontage to Parkside.

== Annual Meetings and Opening Games ==
=== April 23 ===
The Kensington Club held its Annual Meeting on April 23.

=== April 28 ===
The Kensington Football Club held their first meeting for the season on Tuesday, April 28, at Mr. Caterer's schoolroom, Norwood. There were 22 members present. It was resolved, that the club's uniform be scarlet cap and jacket and white trousers.

=== May 6 ===
A meeting of members of the Adelaide Football Club was held at the Prince Alfred Hotel on Wednesday evening, May 6, to receive the reports for the last year, and make arrangements for the forthcoming season. There were about a dozen gentlemen present, and Mr. S.G. Kingston presided. Upwards of 40 members were enrolled.

=== May 9 ===
The football season commenced in the afternoon when the Adelaide Football club played their opening game with a 15 a side game intraclub match.

=== May 21 ===
At an adjourned meeting of the Adelaide Football Club it was reported that His Excellency Governor Musgrave had accepted the office of President, and that Mr. J. Acraman had again intimated his willingness to accept the position of vice-president.

=== May 23 ===
Port Adelaide Football Club advertised they will have their opening game of the season this (Saturday) afternoon at Glanville. The Concordia Band has been engaged, and the members are to appear in uniform.

The Kensington Club also began the season playing for colours.
The following are to be the teams of 25 each:—
Red — Ashwin, Bakewell, Beresford, Bonney, Burton, Calder, Duffield, Foale, R. Gwynne, H. and J. Hall, C. Hargrave, M. Jay, Kaye, Meredith, Muirhead, Noltenius, F. Perry, Roberts, Scott, Sowter, Tardiff, Trimmer, Wigg, ana Wright.
White — Aldridge, Colton, Farr, Gliddon, Gwynne, Haigh, Hargrave, Harvey, Hewer, Hughes, Kaines, Lucas, Marshall, Millner, Moulden, H. and H. R. Perry, Pope, Reid, H. and R.Shell, Schomburgk, Sunter, Tassie, Waterhouse, Whittell, and Williams.

== Metropolitan and Country football matches ==
=== May 2 ===
	Intercollege Match
Saturday, 2 May	Adelaide Educational Institution 0	drew with	Prince Alfred College 0	Parkside
Each team - 16 players. Adelaide Educational Institution founded in 1852 moved to Young Street, Parkside in 1872. It was founded by John Lorenzo Young.

=== May 9: Intercollege Match ===
	Intercollege Match
Saturday, 9 May	St Peter's College 1	def.	Prince Alfred College 0	St Peter's College

=== May 9: Adelaide Intra Club Match ===
	Adelaide Football club Intra Club Match
Saturday, 9 May 3pm	Adelaide (Blue) 2	def.	Adelaide (Red) 1	Adelaide
Adelaide Intraclub match - 15 each side. Captains : H.Holthouse (Blue) and G.S.Kington (Red)

=== June 6 ===
Kensington advertised a game against St Peter's Collegians for 2.30pm on the Kensington Grounds.
Adelaide Football Club advertised a practice game.

=== June 13 ===
	June 13
Saturday, June 13	Young's 0	def. by	Victorian 1	Parkside
Game was advertised for 3pm start at Parkside. Goal Scorer - H. Barry; Adelaide Educational Institution founded was founded by John Lorenzo Young in 1852 and moved to Young Street, Parkside in 1872. Adelaide and Kensington Clubs both advertise practice games.

=== June 22 ===
	Anniversary of the Queen's Accession Public Holiday Match
Monday, June 22	Gawler 1	drew with	Kensington 1	Gawler Park (crowd: 600 -1000)
Game commenced at 1pm and concluded at 5pm (4 hours of play). Colours - Gawler Magneta and White, Kensington Scarlet. Each team consisted of 17 players. Gawler Team - The following are the names of the Gawler competitors : — G. Beade, F. Harris (Captain), H. Harris, E. T. Annells, A. Schwann, J. Wilkinson, T. Wilkinson, J. Robertson, E. Saint, C.Niquet, J. Gordon, E. Filsell, J. Crump, J. Martin, W. Dawkins, J. Ferguson.

=== July 4 ===
Saturday, July 4	Port Adelaide 0	drew with	Kensington 0	Glanville Hall Estate
The first match of the season between these Clubs. The new rules were observed, and were considered a decided improvement on the old ones, taking away the risk of broken collarbones and sprained ankles.

=== July 18 ===
Saturday, July 18	Kensington 1	def.	Port Adelaide 0	Kensington
Return match

=== August 1 ===
Saturday, August 1	Port Adelaide (2nds) 3	def.	Victorian 0	Glanville
Kensington played at colour match

=== August 7 ===
	Public Holiday Games
Friday, August 7	Gawler 1	def.	Port Adelaide 0	Gawler Park Lands
Friday, August 7	Willunga 2	def.	Kensington 0	Noarlunga
Gawler scored a second goal shortly after the first early in the game but it was disputed owing to the interpretation of; one of the rules. However, the game was subsequently continued with great spirit for about two hours.: Kensington wanted to promote the game in the country and decided to play a match against the newly formed Willunga in Noarlunga.

=== August 8 ===
Saturday, August 8 2.30pm	Prince Alfred College 0	drew with	Victorian 0	Prince Alfred College Grounds
J. Melrose and A. Barry captains respectively Kensington Club advertised a practice match at 2.45pm

=== August 22 ===
Saturday, August 22	Victorian 0	def. by	Port Adelaide 2nds 1	Montefiore Hill
Return match - Captains : Victorian G.Downs and Port Seconds G.H.Warren. Goal Scorer H.Ford (Port Adelaide)

=== August 29 ===
Saturday, August 29 2.30pm	Victorian 1	def.	East Terrace 0	Montefiore Hill
Saturday, August 29 (3:00pm)	Kensington 2	def.	Willunga 1	Adelaide Football Grounds

=== September 5 ===
Saturday, September 5	Port Adelaide 0	def. by	Kensington 2	Glanville
This match was arranged to determine the conquering match between the two clubs. Port Adelaide team were weakened due to the absence of a number of leading players.

== Senior Ladder ==
In the table below, Senior Results is based only upon games played against other senior clubs; the record listed under W-L-D is the record over all matches. Victorian Club is excluded as they did not contest any match against any senior club.

There was no formal process by which the clubs were ranked, so the below order should be considered indicative only, particularly since the fixturing of matches was not standardised.

Pos	Team	Pld	W	L	D	Senior Results	GF	GA
1	Kensington	6	3	1	2	3-1-2	6	4
2	Gawler	2	1	0	1	1-0-1	2	1
3	Willunga	2	1	1	0	1-1-0	3	2
4	Port Adelaide	4	0	3	1	0-3-1	0	4

== Ladder - Port Adelaide 2nds and Victorian ==
Pos	Team	Pld	W	L	D	Senior Results	GF	GA
1	Port Adelaide 2nd Twenty-two	2	2	0	0	0-0-0	4	0
2	Victorian	2	0	2	0	0-0-0	0	4

== Ladder - Colleges ==
Pos	Team	Pld	W	L	D	Senior Results	GF	GA
1	St Peter's College	1	1	0	0	0-0-0	1	0
2	Prince Alfred College	3	1	1	1	0-0-0	2	1
3	Adelaide Educational Institution	2	0	1	1	0-0-0	0	2
