= 1876 South Australian football season =

1876 South Australian football premiership season
- Premiers: Victorian; 1st premiership
- Highest: 1,750 (26 August, Collegians vs. Non-Collegians)

The 1876 South Australian football season was the eighth year of interclub football. It was also the final season of decentralised administration of football in South Australia; the South Australian Football Association (SAFA) was formed the following year to provide a committee-based approach to the administration of the sport.

Prior to the establishment of the SAFA in April 1877, the football season was largely a series of independent club matches and challenge games rather than an organized league season. The unaffiliated era was from 1869 to 1876.

== Rules Sets ==
During the 1876 football season in South Australia two dominant rule sets were in use.

- Kensington Rules
- Victorian Rules

== Major Clubs ==
=== Metropolitan ===
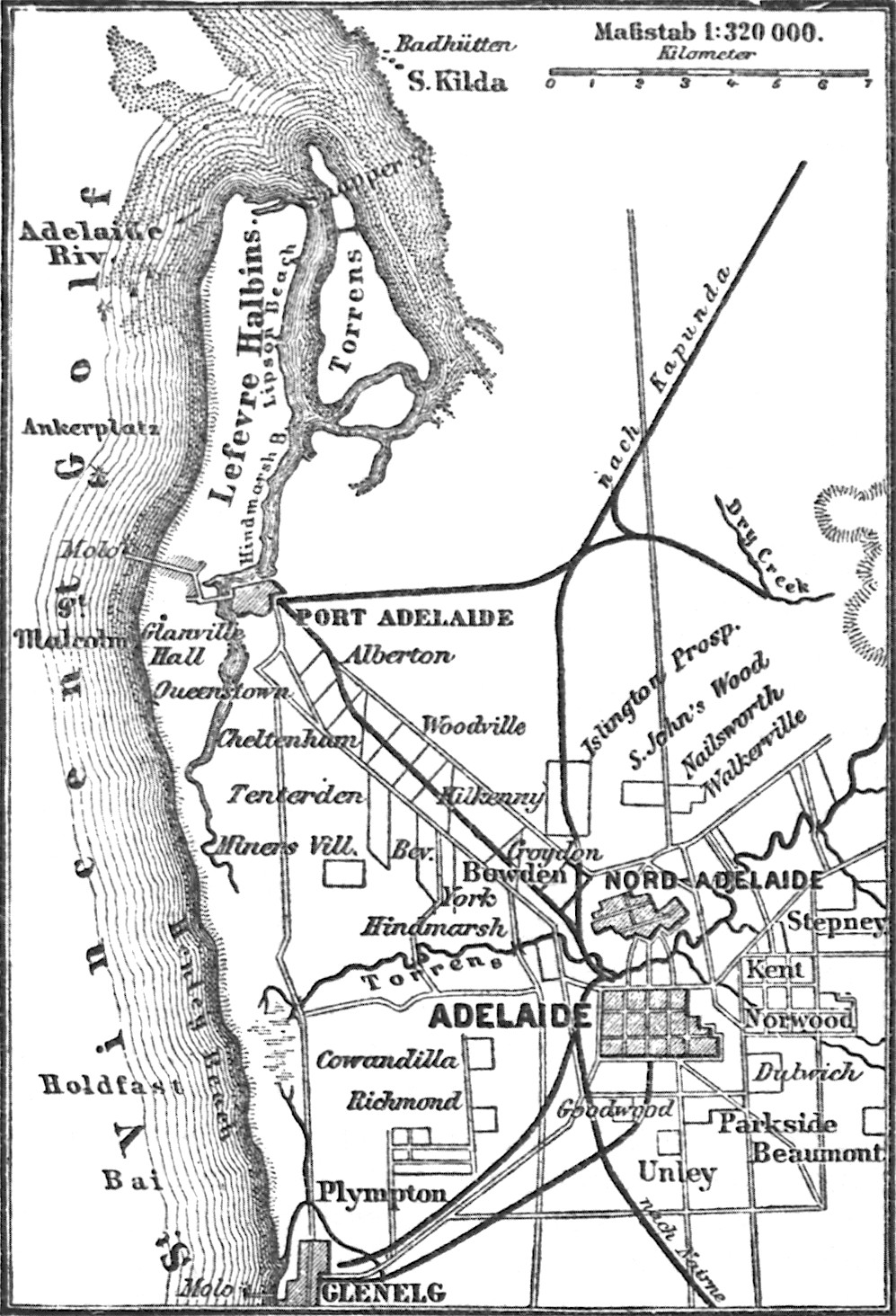
Map of Adelaide and surrounding developments

- Adelaide
- Australs (Based in Adelaide)
- Glenelg
- Kensington
- Port Adelaide
- South Adelaide
- Victorian (Based at foot of Montefiore Hill, North Adelaide)
- Woodville

=== Country Clubs (Outer Metropolitan) ===
- Gawler
- Kapunda
- Willunga

=== Regional Clubs ===
- Mount Gambier
- Young Australian (Mount Gambier)
- Penola
- Naracoorte
- Caltowie
- Yangga
- Laura
- Port Pirie

=== Educational Institutions ===
- Adelaide Educational Institution
- North Adelaide Grammar School
- Prince Alfred College, Kent Town
- St Peter's College
- Glenelg Grammar

== Metropolitan Football Matches ==
=== 20 May ===
	Round 1
Saturday, 20 May	Woodville (Blue) 0	drew with	Kensington (Red) 0	Woodville
Saturday, 20 May (3:00 pm)	Victorian 1	def.	South Adelaide 0	Montefiore Hill

=== 25 May ===
	Round 2
Thursday, 25 May (1:00 pm)	Kapunda 3	def.	Woodville 1	Kapunda

=== 3 June ===
	Round 3
Saturday, 3 June (3:00 pm)	Port Adelaide 0	def. by	Victorian 1	Glanville Hall Estate

=== 10 June ===
	Round 4
Saturday, 10 June (3:00 pm)	Woodville 0	drew with	South Adelaide 0	Woodville
Mr. J. R. Osborn acted as Captain for the Woodvilles, and Mr. Kennedy, who has recently arrived from Melbourne, for the South Adelaideas, Mr. C. Kingston being umpire.

=== 17 June ===
	Round 5
Saturday, 17 June (3:20 pm)	Woodville 2	def.	Victorian 1	Woodville
Saturday, 17 June	Port Adelaide 0	def. by	Kensington 1	Glanville Hall Estate
Woodville (Blue) vs Victorian (Yellow and Black) was played under the Kensington Rules

=== 20 June ===
	Round 6
Tuesday, 20 June (1:30 pm)	Woodville 4	def.	Gawler 0	Woodville
Tuesday, 20 June (2 to 5pm)	Willunga 3	def.	Kensington 1	Noarlunga

=== 1 July ===
	Round 7
Saturday, 1 July (3:00 pm)	Kensington 3	def.	Woodville 1	Kensington Oval
Saturday, 1 July (3:00 pm)	Port Adelaide 0	def. by	South Adelaide 1	Glanville Hall Estate

=== 8 July ===
	Round 8
Saturday, 8 July (3:10 pm)	Adelaide 0	drew with	South Adelaide 0	Old Adelaide Ground (crowd: 400)
Saturday, 8 July (3:00 pm)	Glenelg 0	def. by	Victorian 4	Glenelg
Saturday, 8 July	Woodville 0	def. by	Port Adelaide 1	Woodville
Adelaide vs South Adelaide was played under the Old Adelaide Rules; Glenelg vs Victorian - After the fourth goal was scored the Glenelgs "gave in." A scratch match was then arranged between the members of the two Clubs, which resulted in one goal being obtained for each side. A match was advertised — AUSTRAL V KENSINGTON (second 16), at Kensington, at 2.30 p.m. 8th July by A. S. YOUNG, Hon. Sec., A. F. C. and F. P. PERRY, pro Secretary (Kensington) result 2-2 Draw. Match Report - A match between the Austral and the second sixteen of the Kensington Club was played on the ground of the latter at Kensington on Saturday. At 3 o'clock the ball was kicked off, and after about 10 minutes' play a goal was obtained by A. Young for the blues. Goals were then changed, when some good play took place, and after an exciting tussle, in which the Kensingtons had decidedly the best of the game. Dunstan with a rush took the ball up to the Kensington goal, where F. Stanton succeeded in scoring one for Kensington. On play being resumed, C. Wright obtained a goal for the Australs, and half-an-hour afterwards Wicksteed secured a goal for Kensington. At five o'clock the match was declared drawn as each team had scored two goals. Good play was shown on behalf of the Kensington team by Dunstan, Wyatt, Day, Hargraves, and Smith; for the 'Australs' team by Cossins, Mudie, Pettinger, Acraman, Shander, and Stephens. Messrs. A. S. Young and A. Frew captained the respective teams, and Mr. G. Berry acted as umpire.

=== 15 July ===
	Round 9
Saturday, 15 July (3:25 pm)	Victorian 2	def.	Woodville 0	Montefiore Hill
Saturday, 15 July (4:00 pm)	Kensington 5	def.	Port Adelaide 2	Kensington Oval
Saturday, 15 July	Glenelg 0	def. by	Australs 1	Glenelg

=== 17 July - Woodville to revert to the Old Adelaide Rules ===
The Woodville Football Club lead the push to revert to the Old Adelaide Rules when they place an advertisement on 17 July 1876.

The Woodville Club hereby CHALLENGE any Club in or around Adelaide to play a Game of Football according to the old Adelaide rules, which rules will only be played by the above Club for the future. THOS. LETCHFORD, Hon. Sec.

=== 22 July ===
	Round 10
Saturday, 22 July (3:00 pm)	Adelaide 1	def. by	Woodville 6	North Park Lands (crowd: 300)
Saturday, 22 July (3:00 pm)	Victorian 4	def.	Port Adelaide 0	Montefiore Hill
Saturday, 22 July	Kensington 0	def. by	South Adelaide 1	Kensington Oval
Adelaide and Woodville was the first match under the newly adopted rules. Woodville in Blue, Adelaide players in mixed colours - Black and White, Red and White and White.

=== 29 July ===
	Round 11
Saturday, 29 July (3:30 pm)	Woodville 0	def. by	South Adelaide 2	Woodville (crowd: 600)
Saturday, 29 July	Australs 8	def.	Glenelg 0	(crowd: Australs Home Ground)
After the Australs had scored six goals the rules were changed and they played according to the old Adelaide Rules.

=== 5 August ===
	Round 12
Saturday, 5 August (3:15 pm)	Adelaide 0	drew with	South Adelaide 0	Old Adelaide Ground (crowd: 450)
Saturday, 5 August (3:00 pm)	Port Adelaide 0	def. by	Woodville 1	Glanville Hall Estate
Saturday, 5 August	Willunga 4	def.	Victorian 1	Willunga (crowd: 450)
Willunga vs Victorians - played using the Kensington Rules

=== 7 August ===
	Round 13
Monday, 7 August (1:30 pm)	Kapunda 0	drew with	South Adelaide 0	Kapunda (Ground East of Catholic Chapel) (crowd: 250)

=== 12 August ===
	Round 14
Saturday, 12 August (3:15 pm)	Adelaide 0	def. by	Woodville 3	Old Adelaide Ground (crowd: 1,000)

=== 19 August ===
	Round 15
Saturday, 19 August	Adelaide 0	def. by	Victorian 1	Adelaide Ground (crowd: 600)
Saturday, 19 August (3:15 pm)	South Adelaide 5	def.	Woodville 1	South Terrace, South's Ground
Saturday, 19 August	Port Adelaide 2	def.	Australs 0	Glanville Hall Estate
Saturday, 19 August (3:15 pm)	Kensington 2	def. by	St Peter's College 4	Kensington Oval
Adelaide vs Victorians 5th game under the new rules. This was the first time the Victorian Club had played a match under the old Adelaide Rules. Port Adelaide vs Australs played using the Kensington Rules

=== 2 September ===
	Round 16
Saturday, 2 September	Victorian 2	drew with	Willunga 2	Montefiore Hill (crowd: 350)
Colours : Victorian - Yellow and Black. Willunga - Red. Captains Victorian - Downs. Willunga - Oldham.

=== 26 August ===
College Challenge Match

== Ladder ==
In the table below, Senior Results is based only upon games played against senior clubs; the record listed under W-L-D is the record over all matches, including those against country and junior teams.

1876 South Australian Football Ladder
Pos	Team	Pld	W	L	D	Senior Results	GF	GA
1	Victorian (P)	9	6	2	1	6-1-0	17	8
2	South Adelaide	9	4	1	4	4-1-3	8	1
3	Willunga	3	2	0	1	2-0-1	9	4
4	Australs	4	2	1	1	2-1-1	11	4
5	Kensington	7	3	2	2	3-1-1	14	13
6	Woodville	14	6	6	2	4-5-2	13	12
7	Port Adelaide	8	2	6	0	2-6-0	5	13
8	Kapunda	2	1	0	1	1-0-1	3	1
9	Adelaide	5	0	3	2	0-3-2	1	10
10	Glenelg	3	0	3	0	0-3-0	0	13

Updated to match(es) played on unknown. Source:
(P) Premiers

== Exhibition Collegian Matches ==
	August 26
Saturday, 26 August (3:00 pm)	Collegians 2	def. by	Non-Collegians 4	North Park Lands (crowd: 1,750)
The Collegians (Blue Cap) vs. Non-Collegians (Pink Cap) was an all star match made up of the best players of the Adelaide, Woodville, Kensington, and College clubs.

	September 2
Saturday, 2 September	St Peter's College Collegians 7	def.	Australs 0	St Peter's College grounds
In an advertisement placed on 24 August -St Peter's College Collegians challenged other Adelaide Schools to a match based on Twenty a side; Kensington or Rugby Union Rules. Teams - Collegians 16 vs Australs 13 a side. Captains : Collegians S. Tolley, Australs A.S.Young
