= 1875 South Australian football season =

1875 South Australian football premiership season
- Premiers: Kensington (Metropolitan Clubs); 3rd premiership
- Highest: 800 (10 July, Kensington v Adelaide)

The 1875 South Australian football season was the seventh year of interclub football in South Australia. Prior to the establishment of the South Australian Football Association (SAFA) in April 1877, the football season was largely a series of independent club matches and challenge games rather than an organized league season. The unaffiliated era was from 1869 to 1876.

== Clubs ==
The following clubs participated in interclub matches during 1875:

=== Metropolitan ===
- Adelaide
- Kensington
- Port Adelaide
- South Adelaide (1875)
- Victorian
- Woodville

=== Country ===
- Gawler
- Kapunda (Light)
- Willunga

Notes: Kapunda renamed itself Light at a meeting held at Sir John Franklin Hotel, Kapunda on 27 April 1875 and Mr. T. H. Smith was unanimously elected Captain. The club also ordered a rugby ball from Melbourne as not one was available in the Colony of South Australia.

=== Colleges ===
- Prince Alfred College
- St Peter's College

== Opening Colour Matches ==
Woodville Football Club - The opening colour match of the Club was played on Saturday, 3 April 1875 on the grounds of T.Terrell, Esq., Woodville.

Victorian Football Club opening game was played on their new grounds at the west of Montefiore Hill, on Saturday, May 22, 1875. It was reported a good game was played, which resulted in a goal being obtained by J. Fleming and another by G. Downs, the Captains of the sides.

== Interclub football matches ==
=== May 15: Port Adelaide v Woodville ===
	May 15
Saturday, 15 May	Port Adelaide 1	def.	Woodville 0	Glanville Estate
First match of the season. There were 16 players on each side, the Captains being J. Beck for the Woodville team, and R. C. Sandland for the Port players.

=== May 15: Annual College Match ===
	Annual College Match
Saturday, 15 May	St Peter's College 7	def.	Prince Alfred College 2	St Peter's College

=== Queen's Birthday Holiday ===
	Gawler vs Kapunda (Light)
Monday 24 May 1.30pm	Gawler 3	def.	Kapunda (Light) 0	Gawler
The Kapunda players arrived by the midday train and prior to the commencement of the contest were entertained with a luncheon at the Old Spot Inn by their hosts. Captains : Gawler F.Harris and Kapunda's Captain T.H.Smith BA was replaced at the last minute due to a knee injury by Mr Anthony.

=== May 29 ===
	May 29
Saturday, 29 May (3:30pm)	Kensington 2	drew with	Port Adelaide 2	Kensington Oval
Saturday, 29 May	Victorian 0	def. by	St Peter's College 1	Montefiore Hill

=== June 5 ===
	Return Match - Woodville v Port Adelaide
Saturday, 5 June	Woodville 0	def. by	Port Adelaide 2

=== June 12 ===
A match was advertised Port Adelaide vs Victorians for Saturday 12 June. Football was cancelled due to bad weather.

=== June 19 ===
	Port Adelaide Seconds and Victorian Match
Saturday, 19 June (3:00 pm)	Port Adelaide Seconds 0	drew with	Victorian 0	Glanville Hall Oval
It was reported the recent football match between the Victoria and Port Clubs the latter had their second team in the field. Kensington postponed football on Kensington Park oval due to wet weather.

=== June 24 ===
	Kapunda vs Gawler Rematch
Thursday, 24 June 11.45am	Kapunda 1	def.	Gawler 0	Kapunda Mine Paddock
Junior Match Under 16s was also played between Kapunda 2 goals and Gawler 2 goals. Result drawn.

=== June 26 ===
Saturday, 26 June (3:00pm)	Woodville 0	def. by	Kensington 2	Woodville
Saturday, 26 June	Victorian 4	def.	Kensington Seconds 0	Montefiore Hill
Teams - Kensington Firsts — Acraman, Babbage, Barret, Burton, Crooks, Gale, Green, Hall (3), Jay, Mackman, Milne, Perry, Sholl, Sunter, Tardif, Tassie, Williams, Wood. Woodville — Annells, Brock, Brailey, Baker, Dale, Darby, Formby, Holthouse, Hay, Jenkins, Lines, Letchford, Osborne, Rumball, Stevens, Taylor. Trimmer, Terrell, Young (2).

=== July 3 ===
Saturday, 3 July (3:15pm)	Port Adelaide 0	drew with	Kensington 0	Glanville Hall Estate
Saturday, 3 July (3:15pm)	Victorian 2	def.	Woodville 0	Montefiore Hill

=== July 10: Opening of Kensington Oval ===
	Opening of Kensington Oval
Saturday, 10 July	Kensington 1	def.	Adelaide 0	Kensington Oval (crowd: 800)
The match at Kensington Oval was the first at the ground.; The match was Adelaide's first interclub game since 1872.

=== July 10: Victorian v Port Adelaide Seconds ===
	Victorian and Port Adelaide Seconds Return Match
Saturday, 10 July (3.30pm)	Victorian 2	def.	Port Adelaide Seconds 0	Montefiore Hill
Second goal scored by Victorians was disputed by some of the Port players. This ended the game.

=== July 24: Adelaide v Woodville ===
Saturday, 24 July (3:00pm)	Adelaide 2	drew with	Woodville 2	Adelaide
Colours : Adelaide (Blue) Woodville (Black)

=== July 24: College Return Match ===
	College Return Match
Saturday, 24 July	Prince Alfred College 6	def.	St Peter's College 2	Prince Alfred College

=== July 24: Kensington Seconds v Victorians ===
	Kensington Seconds vs Victorians Return Match
Saturday, 24 July	Kensington Seconds 1	def. by	Victorian 2	Kensington

=== July 31 ===
Saturday, 31 July (3:00pm)	Adelaide 3	def.	Port Adelaide 1	Adelaide Grounds
Saturday, 31 July (3:00pm)	Kensington 4	def.	Woodville 0	Kensington Oval
Woodville — Annells, Baker, Beck, Dale, Darby, Holthouse, Ive, Letchford, lines, Newman, Osborne, Stevens, Taylor, Townsend, Trimmer, Terrell (3). Young (2). Kensington — Acraman, Burton, Crooks, Farr, Gale, Green, Hall (2), Hallett, Jay, Milne, Moulden, Perry (2), Sholl, Sunter, Tardif, Tassie, Williams, and Wood.

=== August 6 ===
Friday, 6 August	Kensington 0	def. by	Willunga 1	Kensington Oval
Friday, 6 August 1.30pm	Gawler 2	def.	Woodville 0	Gawler Parklands

=== August 14 ===
Saturday, 14 August	Woodville 2	def.	Adelaide 1	Woodville
Saturday, 14 August	Victorian 5	def.	Prince Alfred College 0	Montefiore Hill
Victorian 5 goals all scored by H.Barry

=== August 21 ===
Saturday, 21 August	Adelaide 0	def. by	Port Adelaide 1	North Park Lands
Saturday, 21 August (3:00pm)	South Adelaide (1875) 1	def. by	Kensington 4	South Park Lands
Saturday, 21 August (shortly before 3:00pm)	St Peter's College 2	def. by	Victorian 7	St Peter's College
Adelaide vs Port Adelaide - 16 players each team. Played under the Port rules. South Adelaide vs Kensington - 21 players each team.

=== August 28 ===
Saturday, 28 August (3:00pm)	Victorian 1	drew with	Kensington 1	Montefiore Hill
This match was the second time the Victorians played an established Senior First and the first time against the Kensington First Team.

== Ladder ==
In the table below the record listed under Metro Senior W-L-D is the record in matches, excluding those against Country, Seconds and College teams. Any matches against Seconds and College Teams have been excluded and appear in other tables.

There was no formal process by which the clubs were ranked, so the below order should be considered indicative only, particularly since the fixturing of matches was not standardised.

Pos	Team	Pld	W	L	D	Metro Senior Results (W-L-D)	GF	GA
1	Kensington	9	4	2	3	4-0-3	15	8
2	Port Adelaide	6	3	1	2	3-1-2	7	5
3	Willunga	2	2	0	0	0-0-0	4	1
4	Gawler	3	2	1	0	0-0-0	5	1
5	Victorian	2	1	0	1	1-0-1	3	1
6	Kapunda (Light)	2	1	1	0	0-0-0	1	3
7	Adelaide	5	1	3	1	1-3-1	6	7
8	Woodville	8	1	6	1	1-5-1	4	16
9	South Adelaide (1875)	1	0	1	0	0-1-0	1	4

== Summary of Results - Victorian Firsts, Kensington and Port Adelaide Seconds ==
Pos	Team	Pld	W	L	D	Senior Results	GF	GA
1	Victorian	4	3	0	1	0-0-0	8	1
2	Port Adelaide Seconds	2	0	1	1	0-0-0	0	2
3	Kensington Seconds	2	0	0	2	0-0-0	1	6

== Summary of Results - Victorian Firsts and Colleges ==
Pos	Team	Pld	W	L	D	Senior Results	GF	GA
1	Victorian	3	2	1	0	0-0-0	12	3
2	St Peter's College	4	2	2	0	0-0-0	12	15
3	Prince Alfred College	3	1	2	0	0-0-0	8	14

Note: No record can be found for a rematch (2nd game) between Victorian and Prince Alfred College.

== Annual Dinners and Closing Games ==
Victorian Club at the 1875 annual dinner held at the Crown and Sceptre Hotel on Wednesday evening, 15 September the secretary, George Downs reported that the club had only lost the opening match out of nine matches played, and that they had obtained 23 goals in these matches to four goals scored against them.

Woodville Club played their closing game at Woodville on Saturday 18 September between two teams Blues (Captain Mr. T. Terrell) and Black and Whites (Captain Mr. J. Beck) starting at 3pm played in 2 halves of approximately 1 hour each. The Blues team kicked two goals - one in each half which brought the half time adjournment and the end of play.

The closing game for the season of the Port Adelaide, Football Club Club was played at Glanville on Saturday, October 2. After playing for an hour, the Blues secured a goal, which was the only one obtained during the afternoon. There was a good number of spectators, and Mrs. Wells distributed the prizes at the close. The Club's fifth annual ball took place in the Town Hall on Friday, October 8. Although the weather was rough, there were about 200 persons present. The Hall was tastefully decorated with flags and evergreens, and on the platform was a small goal with a ball suspended in the centre.

== Miscellaneous ==
An advertisement was placed on 19 April 1876 in the Adelaide Evening Journal titled - THE FOOTBALLER, 1875.— An Annual Record of Football. Price 1s. GEORGE ROBERTSON, Opposite the Town Hall.
