= Alfred McMichael =

Australian rules footballer

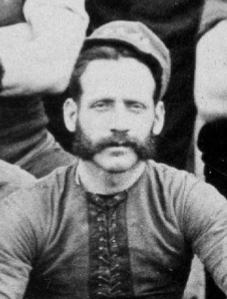
- Alfred McMichael in 1879.

Personal information
- Full name: Alfred Stanbury McMichael
- Nickname: Alf
- Born: 1855; Collingwood, Victoria
- Died: 1 November 1938 (aged 82–83); Armadale, Victoria
- Original team: Carlton Imperial

Playing career
Years	Club	Games (Goals)
1875	Carlton Imperial	7 (1)
1876–1877, 1880	Carlton	23 (5)
1878–1880	Norwood	29 (8)
1881–1882	South Melbourne	23 (1)
Total		82 (15)

Career highlights
- Carlton premiership player (1877); 3x Norwood premiership player (1878, 1879, 1880); South Melbourne premiership player (1881); Norwood life member (1885)

Alfred McMichael was an Australian rules footballer. In 1879 he was the first captain of the South Australian state football team that toured Victoria.

== Personal life ==
His younger brother Samuel McMichael played for Fitzroy.
