= Bankers Football Club =

Bankers

Names
- Full name: Bankers Football Club

1877 season
- Home-and-away season: 8th (Last - Wooden Spoon)

Club details
- Founded: 28 March 1877
- Dissolved: 15 September 1877
- Colours: Blue White
- Competition: South Australian Football Association
- Captain(s): A. Crooks (5 games); Mr. Cotton (3 games)

Uniforms
Home

The Bankers Football Club was an Australian rules football club that competed in the inaugural 1877 South Australian Football Association (SAFA) season. The club was formed on 28 March 1877 from a meeting of about 30 officers of the Banks of Adelaide.

The club lost every one of its scheduled 15 matches, finishing eighth and collecting the inaugural SAFA wooden spoon, scoring just 4 goals and conceding 36. Six of these losses were following forfeits (Adelaide, Port Adelaide, South Adelaide, Kensington 1 each, and Woodville 2) , as the club struggled to field a full team particularly later in the season.

== History ==
=== Formation ===
A meeting of the members of Bankers was held on 13 April 1877. H. F. J. Bloudel was elected as secretary and treasurer, while A. Crooks, H. Edwards, R. P. Poole, W. Cornish, and S. Dyke were elected as committeemen.

=== 1877 season ===
The club's first official match was on Saturday, 12 May 1877 against Adelaide on the Adelaide Oval, with Mr. Colton as captain. Their only goal was kicked by Lindsay in a 1–4 defeat. The match was advertised for the week before on Saturday 5 May for a 2.30pm start but was postponed due to the weather. Bankers were to wear White jerseys.

Tragedy struck the Club when one of its players C.B. (Charles) Poole died on 5 June after suffering an injury in the club's second game against South Park on 19 May. There was ensuring debate as a consequent about the rule of when a player was collared with the ball.

The club's last recorded game was on Saturday, 28 July 1877 against South Park, with Crooks as captain in a 0-3 goals defeat.

=== Disbandment ===
It was reported that the Bankers forfeited their game on 11 August 1877 vs Port Adelaide at Montefiore Hill. Port had a full team on the field when the Bankers captain Cotton informed them that his team would not be present.

A game was scheduled and advertised for 15 September 1877 between Adelaide and Bankers at Adelaide. However, it was reported that Bankers as announced will not meet Adelaide.

On 15 September it was reported in The Australian Star they had shut up shop in consequence of their repeated defeats, and that the blue and white is no more to be seen on the football field.

Bankers was seen by fans, the media and other teams as being equal to a social club at the elite level. At the end of the 1877 season, 'Marlborough', writing in The Advertiser, implicitly echoed these sentiments, and expressed the hope "that no efforts will be made to establish it next season". The writer got his wish, as the Bankers dropped out of the SAFA and disbanded never to be seen again.

== Summary of Results SAFA 1877 Season ==
BANKERS FOOTBALL CLUB
SUMMARY OF RESULTS SAFA 1877 SEASON
Round	Date	Venue	Opponent	Result	Goals For	Goals Against	Captain	Goalkicker
1	12/05/1877	Adelaide Ground	Adelaide	Lost	1	4	Mr. Cotton	
2	19/05/1877	South Park Lands	South Park	Lost	0	1	Mr. Cotton	
3	26/05/1877	No Game						
4	02/06/1877	Glanville	Port Adelaide	Lost	0	3	Mr. Cotton	
5	09/06/1877	No Game						
6	16/06/1877	South Adelaide Ground	South Adelaide	Forfeited as only mustered 13 players				
7	23/06/1877	Montefiore Hill, North Adelaide	Victorian	Lost	0	7	A. Crooks	
8	30/06/1877	No Game						
9	07/07/1877	Adelaide Ground	Adelaide	Lost	0	9	A. Crooks	
10	14/07/1877	Adelaide Ground	Kensington	Lost	1	4	A. Crooks	
11	21/07/1877	Montefiore Hill, North Adelaide	Victorian	Lost	1	5	A. Crooks	
12	28/07/1877	South Park Lands	South Park	Lost	0	3	A. Crooks	
13	04/08/1877	No Game						
14	11/08/1877	Montefiore Hill, North Adelaide	Port Adelaide	Forfeited. Port had a full team on the field when the Bankers' captain informed them and the umpire that the Bankers were unable to field a team.			Mr. Cotton	
18	15/09/1877	Adelaide Ground	Adelaide	Game was advertised but not played				

It was reported at the end of the season that Bankers had forfeited 6 out of their 15 games.
Adelaide, Kensington, Port Adelaide, South Adelaide once each and Woodville twice.

== Bankers Football Club Records ==
Seasons: 1
Premierships: 0
Wooden Spoons (Last):1
Total Games Played: 15 Wins: 0 Losses: 15 Drawn: 0 Goals For: 3 Goals Against: 36
First Match: Round 1, 12 May 1877 at Old Adelaide Oval. Bankers 1 goal lost to Adelaide 4 goals.
First Win: NO WINS
First Loss: Round 1, 12 May 1877 at Old Adelaide Oval. Bankers 1 goal lost to Adelaide 4 goals.
First Draw: NO DRAWN MATCHES
Last Match: Round 14, 11 August 1877. Bankers forfeited to Port Adelaide.
Last Match Played: Round 12, 28 July 1877 at South Parklands. Bankers 0 goals lost to South Park 3 goals.
Last Win: NO WINS.
Last Drawn: NO DRAWS.
Highest Score: 1 goal on 3 occasions.
Highest Score Against: 9 goals. Round 9, 7 July 1877. Adelaide 9 goals defeated Bankers 0 goals.
Lowest Winning Score: NO WINS.
Lowest Winning Score Against: 1 goal. Round 2, 19 May 1877. South Park 1 goal defeated Bankers 0 goal.
Biggest Winning Score Against: 9 goals. Round 9, 7 July 1877. Adelaide 9 goals defeated Bankers 0 goals.
Biggest Losing Score: 1 goal on 3 occasions.
Lowest Score: 0 goals on 6 occasions.
Lowest Score Against: 1 goal. Round 2, 19 May 1877. South Park 1 goal defeated Bankers 0 goal.
Biggest Winning Margin: NO WINS.
Biggest Losing Margin: 9 goals. Round 9, 7 July 1877. Adelaide 9 goals defeated Bankers 0 goals.
Smallest Winning Margin: NO WINS.
Smallest Losing Margin: 1 goal. Round 2, 19 May 1877. South Park 1 goal defeated Bankers 0 goal.
Biggest Match Aggregate: 9 goals. Round 9, 7 July 1877. Adelaide 9 goals defeated Bankers 0 goal.
Smallest Match Aggregate: 1 goal. Round 2, 19 May 1877. South Park 1 goal defeated Bankers 0 goal.
Longest Winning Sequence: NO WINS.
Longest Losing Sequence: 15 games (including forfeits). Round 1, 12 May 1877 - Round 18, 15 September 1877.

== Social and charity matches ==
Despite the Bankers senior team folding in the SAFA in 1877, social and charity matches were arranged from time to time.

On 21 May 1879, a football match between Bankers and Civil Servants took place on the North Park Lands. The weather was fine, but the attendance at the beginning of the match was very meagre. It, however, increased as the afternoon went on. C. Hughes captained the Civil Servants, and A. Crooks the Bankers. The latter was distinguished by a white band around the arm. Civil Servants scored the only goal.

On 26 July 1888, the Bankers, 1 goals 5 behinds, defeated the Brokers, 5 behinds at Adelaide Oval. The gate takings from the match and 25 per cent of catering profits were devoted to the "Star of Greece" relief fund. Unfortunately owing to the rain the contributors were not so numerous as they otherwise might have been.

On 11 August 1888, Bankers defeated Brokers 4 goals to 3 at Adelaide Oval. Both teams comprised several of the leading players in the colony, but the game was reportedly rather slow. Proceeds from the match went to the Children's Hospital.

On 16 June 1890, the annual football match between the Bankers and Brokers was played on the Adelaide Oval on Thursday afternoon, but only a very small number of people were present. Bankers won 4.9 to 4.1.

== Notable players ==
Alexander Crooks (originally from the Adelaide Club), and who joined the Kensington Football Club in 1878 and became their captain. He was also a bank manager of Commercial Bank of South Australia, cricketer (played for South Australia) and embezzler.

Crooks, a bank clerk, had come to the notice of the elite in 1874 in a moment of cricketing fame when, representing South Australia at Adelaide Oval, he took a spectacular boundary catch to dismiss the legendary W. G. Grace for six runs. Crooks became treasurer of the South Australian Cricket Association and, by 1885, he became its chairman but resigned shortly before the bank scandal broke. A large part of the bank’s cash deficiency turned out to be money misappropriated by Crooks as SACA treasurer. The bank shareholders’ meeting called for Crooks’ lynching. He avoided that but served eight years in Yatala Labour Prison.
