= 1880 SAFA season =

1880 SAFA premiership season
- Teams: 7
- Premiers: Norwood; 3rd premiership
- Leading goalkicker: Joe Traynor; Norwood (7 Goals)
- Matches played: 38
- Highest: 3,000 (Round 2, South Adelaide vs. Norwood)

The 1880 South Australian Football Association season was the 4th season of the top-level Australian rules football competition in South Australia.

The season commenced on the 8th of May and drew to a close on the 18th of September.

Norwood went on to record its 3rd consecutive premiership.

== Pre-season and opening club colour Matches ==
The football season of 1880 was opened on Saturday, April 24, 1880 with the senior clubs playing either internal colour matches which drew a fair amount of spectators or practice matches against Junior Clubs. For the third season in succession there was no change in the number of senior clubs.

== SAFA Senior Clubs 1880 Season ==
Club	Colours	Home Ground	Captain	Comments
Adelaide	Black, Red	Old Adelaide Ground, North Adelaide	C. W. Hughes	
Kensington	Scarlet White	Kensington Oval, Kensington	George Milne	
Norwood	Dark blue Red	East Park Lands, Adelaide	J.R. Osborn	
Port Adelaide	Magenta	Alberton Oval, Alberton	J.A.Atkins / J.Carter	
South Adelaide	Navy Blue White	South Terrace, Adelaide	J.H. Sinclair / A.C Mehrtens	
South Park	Light Blue White	South Park Lands, Adelaide		
Victorian	Orange Black	Montefiore Hill, North Adelaide		

== Premiership season ==
=== Round 1 ===
	Round 1
Saturday, 8 May	Norwood 5.17 (5)	def.	Port Adelaide 0.3 (0)	East Park Lands
Saturday, 8 May	Victorian 3	def.	Adelaide 0	Montefiore Hill
Saturday, 8 May	South Park 0	def. by	South Adelaide 1	South Park Lands
	Bye; Kensington

=== Round 2 ===
	Round 2
Saturday, 15 May (3:20 pm)	South Adelaide 0	def. by	Norwood 2.18 (2)	South Park Lands (crowd: 3,000)
Saturday, 15 May	South Park 0	def. by	Victorian 1	South Park Lands
Saturday, 15 May	Port Adelaide 1.7 (1)	def.	Kensington 0	Alberton Oval
	Bye; Adelaide
The match between Port Adelaide and Kensington was the first time Alberton Oval was used for premiership points. Adelaide who had the bye played a game against Glenelg.

=== Round 3 ===
	Round 3
Saturday, 22 May (3:15 pm)	Norwood 3.22 (3)	def.	Kensington 0.1 (0)	Adelaide Oval (crowd: 600)
Saturday, 22 May (3:00 pm)	Adelaide 1	drew with	South Adelaide 1	Adelaide Bridge (crowd: 350)
	Bye; Port Adelaide, Victorian, South Park

=== Round 4 ===
	Round 4
Saturday, 29 May	Adelaide 0.1	def. by	Norwood 7.29 (7)	Adelaide Bridge (crowd: 300)
Saturday, 29 May	Kensington 0.1 (0)	def. by	South Park 2.20 (2)	Kensington Oval
	Bye; Port Adelaide
Controversy regarding a goal kicked during the Victorian and South Adelaide game meant the result was not confirmed until it was referred to the SAFA committee. The result of the game was eventually decided to not count towards the premiership.

=== Round 5 ===
	Round 5
Saturday, 5 June	Norwood 3.25 (3)	def.	South Park 0	Adelaide Oval
Saturday, 5 June	Victorian 0.8 (0)	drew with	Port Adelaide 0.2 (0)	Montefiore Hill
Saturday, 5 June	Kensington 5.12 (5)	def.	Adelaide 1.3 (1)	Kensington Oval
	Bye; South Adelaide
Kensington's win over Adelaide was its first since 1877, ending a winless streak of 30 matches.

=== Round 6 ===
	Round 6
Saturday, 12 June	Norwood 2.11 (2)	def.	Victorian 1.2 (1)	Adelaide Oval (crowd: 2,000)
Saturday, 12 June	Port Adelaide 3.17 (3)	def.	Adelaide 0.3 (0)	Alberton Oval
Saturday, 12 June	South Adelaide 1.6 (1)	def.	Kensington 0.9 (0)	South Park Lands
	Bye; South Park

=== Round 7 ===
	Round 7
Saturday, 19 June (3:30 pm)	South Adelaide 3.10 (3)	def.	Port Adelaide 1.1 (1)	South Park Lands
Saturday, 19 June	Kensington 1.8 (1)	def.	Victorian 0.3 (0)	Kensington Oval
Saturday, 19 June	Adelaide 2	def.	South Park 0	Adelaide Oval
	Bye; Norwood
Norwood began a trip to Victoria on 19 June to play a series of five matches against VFA clubs and would not participate in the SAFA for the next four rounds.

=== Round 8 ===
	Round 8
Saturday, 26 June	Victorian 3.4 (3)	def.	South Park 1.5 (1)	Adelaide Oval
Saturday, 26 June (3:30 pm)	South Adelaide 6.20 (6)	def.	Adelaide 1	South Park Lands
Saturday, 26 June (3:30 pm)	Kensington 2.4 (2)	drew with	Port Adelaide 2.12 (2)	Kensington Oval
	Bye; Norwood

=== Round 9 ===
	Round 9
Saturday, 3 July	Port Adelaide 3.8 (3)	drew with	South Adelaide 3.4 (3)	Alberton Oval (crowd: 300)
Saturday, 3 July (3:30 pm)	Adelaide 0.3 (0)	def. by	Victorian 1.15 (1)	Adelaide Oval (crowd: 350)
Saturday, 3 July	South Park 1	def. by	Kensington 2	South Park Grounds
	Bye; Norwood

=== Round 10 ===
	Round 10
Saturday, 10 July (3:30 pm)	South Adelaide 2.7 (2)	def.	South Park 0.4 (0)	South Park Lands
Saturday, 10 July	Port Adelaide 0.5 (0)	drew with	Victorian 0.3 (0)	Alberton Oval (crowd: 600)
Saturday, 10 July (3:30 pm)	Adelaide 1.4 (1)	drew with	Kensington 1.4 (1)	Adelaide Oval
	Bye; Norwood

=== Round 11 ===
	Round 11
Saturday, 17 July	Port Adelaide 0.4 (0)	drew with	Norwood 0.18 (0)	Alberton Oval (crowd: 750)
Saturday, 17 July (3:00 pm)	Kensington 3.2 (3)	def.	South Adelaide 1.15 (1)	Kensington Oval
Saturday, 17 July	South Park 4.16 (4)	def.	Adelaide 0.1 (0)	South Park Lands
	Bye; Victorian

=== Round 12 ===
	Round 12
Saturday, 24 July (3:30 pm)	Norwood 2.16 (2)	def.	South Adelaide 1.1 (1)	East Park Lands (crowd: 2,000)
Saturday, 24 July	South Park 1.11 (1)	def.	Port Adelaide 0.9 (0)	Adelaide Oval
Saturday, 24 July (3:30 pm)	Victorian 1.16 (1)	drew with	Kensington 1.0 (1)	Montefiore Hill
	Bye; Adelaide

=== Round 13 ===
	Round 13
Saturday, 28 August (3:15 pm)	Adelaide 0	def. by	Port Adelaide 4	Adelaide's Ground (North Park Lands)
Sunday, 28 August (cancelled)	Kensington	v	Norwood	Kensington Oval
Saturday, 28 August (3:30 pm)	South Adelaide 0	drew with	Victorian 0	South Adelaide Ground (crowd: 300)
	Bye; South Park
Adelaide played with only 14 as 6 of their players failed to appear.; The match scheduled for Saturday, 28 August between Kensington and Norwood was cancelled with mutual consent.; Following refusal to permit players to play in intercolonial matches, South Adelaide was expelled from the SAFA. Their match against Victorian was played without being sanctioned, and subsequent matches were cancelled.

=== Round 14 ===
	Round 14
Sunday, 11 September (cancelled)	Norwood	v	South Park	(crowd: Adelaide Oval)
	Bye; South Adelaide, Adelaide, Kensington, Victorian, Port Adelaide
Norwood refused to contest the match owing to poor weather. South Park claimed the match, and were awarded the win for the match despite a Norwood dispute.

=== Round 15 ===
	Round 15
Saturday, 18 September (3:00 pm)	Victorian 2.7 (2)	def.	Norwood 1.10 (1)	North Park Lands
Saturday, 18 September	Port Adelaide 2.3 (2)	def. by	South Park 4.4 (4)	Alberton Oval
	Bye; South Adelaide, Adelaide, Kensington
This was Norwood's first loss after 30 matches in the competition, excluding the Walkover the previous week against South Park.

=== Additional matches ===
Controversy regarding a goal kicked during the Victorian and South Adelaide game meant the result was not confirmed until it was referred to the SAFA committee. The result of the game was eventually decided to not count towards the premiership.

	Victorian vs. South Adelaide
Saturday, 29 May	Victorian 1.5 (1)	def.	South Adelaide 0.2 (0)	Adelaide Oval (crowd: 600)

The Port Adelaide and Victorian football clubs decided to play another game against each other as their two previous matches during the season resulted in draws.

	Port Adelaide vs. Victorian
Saturday, 4 September	Port Adelaide 0.5 (0)	def. by	Victorian 2.11 (2)	Alberton Oval (crowd: 500)

== Ladder ==
An end of season table was published in multiple newspapers on 25 September 1880. Due to a transcription error by the reporter, Port Adelaide's loss count was erroneously reported as 3 losses in these reports. This has been corrected in the below table.

1880 SAFA Ladder
	TEAM	P	W	L	D	GF	GA	Pts	Adj Pts
1	Norwood (P)	10	7	2	1	25	4	15	18.00
2	Victorian	10	5	2	3	12	6	13	15.60
3	South Adelaide	10	5	3	2	19	13	12	14.40
4	South Park	12	5	7	0	13	16	10	10.00
5	Kensington	11	4	4	3	15	14	11	12.00
6	Port Adelaide	12	3	4	5	16	18	11	11.00
7	Adelaide	11	1	8	2	6	35	4	4.36
Key: P = Played, W = Won, L = Lost, D = Drawn, GF = Goals For, GA = Goals Against, Pts = Points, Adj Pts = Points adjusted for match ratio, (P) = Premiers									

Notes:

- The result of the disputed game Victorian v. South Adelaide (Rd 4) has been excluded.
- The game South Adelaide v. Victorian (Rd 13) has not been included due to South Adelaide's expulsion on 23rd August.
- South Park were awarded a walkover win against Norwood (Rd 14).
- The additional special match between the Port Adelaide and Victorian on 4th September is not included.

=== 1880 SAFA Home and Away Season ===
Home \ Away	NOR	VIC	SAD	SPK	KEN	PAD	ADL
Norwood		2–1	2–1	3–0	3–0	5–0	
Victorian	2–1			3–1	1–1	0–0	3–0
South Adelaide	0–2			2–0	1–0	3–1	6–1
South Park		0–1	0–1		1–2	1–0	4–0
Kensington		1–0	3–1	0–2		2–2	5–1
Port Adelaide	0–0	0–0	3–3	2–4	1–0		3–0
Adelaide	0–7	0–1	1–1	2–0	1–1	0–4	

Legend: Blue = home team win; Yellow = draw; Red = away team win.

== Norwood's Intercolonial club matches ==
Norwood 1-5 draw Carlton 1-6 - East Melbourne Cricket Ground, 26 June 1880
Norwood 2-0 def Melbourne 0-0 - East Melbourne Cricket Ground, 1 July 1880
Norwood 0-0 def by Geelong 1-0 - Corio Oval, 3 July 1880
Norwood 0-5 def by Hotham 1-14 - East Melbourne Cricket Ground, 6 July 1880
Norwood 1-6 draw South Melbourne 1-12 - East Melbourne Cricket Ground, 8 July 1880

== SAFA Intercolonial matches ==
A Victorian Association representative team toured South Australia in August, playing three intercolonial matches – two at even strength against the South Australian Football Association representative team, and one against a team of twenty-three South Australian-born players – and winning all three. J. Gibson (South Melbourne) served as captain of the Victorian Association team.

	1880 Intercolonial Matches
Saturday, 14 August	South Australia 2.7 (2)	def. by	Victoria 5.13 (5)	Adelaide Oval (crowd: 4,000)
Wednesday, 18 August	South Australian-born (23) 1.1 (1)	def. by	Victoria 5.17 (5)	Adelaide Oval (crowd: 1,500)
Saturday, 21 August	South Australia 0.6 (0)	def. by	Victoria 3.21 (3)	Adelaide Oval (crowd: 2,500)
