= Victorian Football Club (SAFA) =

Australian sports group

Victorian (1874-1882) North Adelaide (1883-1884)

Names
- Full name: Victorian Football Club
- Nickname: Tigers

Club details
- Founded: May 1873
- Dissolved: 21 April 1885; 141 years ago (resigned from SAFA)
- Colours: Black Orange
- Competition: South Australian Interclub (1874–76) South Australian Football Association (1877–84)
- Premierships: (2): 1876 (interclub), 1877 (SAFA, Shared)
- Ground: Montefiore Hill, North Adelaide

The Victorian Football Club, "The Victorians", renamed the North Adelaide Football Club for the 1883 SAFA season, was an Australian rules football club based in North Adelaide, South Australia. The team wore an orange-and black guernsey and hose, with black knickerbockers, and were known to their supporters as "The Tigers."

== Club Home Ground Established (1873) ==
The club's home ground was established in May 1873 at the portion of the Adelaide Park Lands at the foot of Strangways Terrace, Montefiore Hill, North Adelaide. The club's secretary J. Hay was granted approval from the Adelaide Corporation to erect goals and use the land for football games.

== Early History Interclub (1874 - 1876 ) ==
The Victorian Football Club first recorded game was against a team called Young's, Adelaide Educational Institution founded by John Lorenzo Young, on Saturday 13 June 1874 which was advertised for a 3pm start at Parkside by the club secretary G.E.Downs. The game resulted in a victory with the only goal kicked by H. Barry who played excellently all afternoon.

On 22 May 1875, a new home ground west of and at the foot of Montefiore Hill, North Adelaide was established and used for games until the end of the 1881 season.

At the 1875 annual dinner held at the Crown and Sceptre Hotel on Wednesday evening, 15 September the secretary, George Downs reported that the club had only lost the opening match out of nine matches played, and that they had obtained 23 goals in these matches to four goals scored against them.

The Victorian Football Club captained by George Downs was the first to play a game against the newly formed South Adelaide Football Club on 20 May 1876 at Montefiore Hill which started at 3pm. After some hard work and several disputes over the rules of the game, it ceased two hours later after the home team the Victorians scored a goal by H. Barry.

The club finished the 1876 football season as the unofficial premiers of interclub matches and becoming a founding member of the South Australian Football Association (SAFA) in 1877.

== Foundation member and Joint Inaugural Premiers of SAFA (1877) ==
The Victorian club sent delegates and joined the newly formed South Australian Football Association on 30 April 1877. Club President was Mr. W. N Pratt and the Hon. Secretary, Mr. W. R. Whitfield.

The club's first SAFA game was against Port Adelaide and was played on their home game at Montefiore Hill, North Adelaide on Saturday 26 May 1877. It ended in a victory of one goal to nil.
The team selected was — H. Barry, G. Downs (Captain), C. Warren, J. Sharp, W. Knill, W. Alratton, B. Furnell, G. Bryant, W. Lammey, F. Fiveash, G. Murray, J. Lyons, J. Davis, W. Davis, A. Frayne, J. Atkinson, F. Atkinson, H. Allen, W. Osborne, W, Salsberg. Emergency men — F. Culley, F. Beetson.

The club was declared joint premiers with South Adelaide, in the inaugural SAFA season of 1877. In head to head clashes the Victorians had a scoreless draw and in the final game of the season on their home ground at foot of Montefiore Hill a win by scoring a single goal against the previously undefeated South Adelaides.

One notable game that the Victorian Football Club played was the first intercolonial match involving a South Australian club. The game was held on 11 August 1877 on the Adelaide Exhibition Grounds against the Melbourne Football Club, with the visitors winning 1 goal to nil.

== Interstate Trip to Victoria (1878) ==
The Club was also the first South Australian team to undertake an interstate trip to Victoria in August 1878. They were hosted by Melbourne who won both games: on 17 August, Melbourne 1.23 d. Victorian (SAFA) 0.1; and on 19 August, Melbourne 2.13 d. Victorian (SAFA) 0.4. Geelong Football Club also hosted the club at Geelong and a match was played at Corio Cricket Ground on 21 August, Geelong 6.26 d. Victorian (SAFA) 0.0 Both Geelong and Melbourne played off for the VFA premiership in 1878.

The Club played the final game of their tour against Ballarat which they won when Poole scored the only goal of the match from a fine kick. Final Scores : Victorian (SAFA) 1.2 (1) d. Ballarat 0.15 (0)

== Change of name to North Adelaide (1883) ==
At the Annual General Meeting held on Friday 16 March 1883 at Scotch Thistle Hotel, North Adelaide, with 40 members present, the club resolved to change its name to North Adelaide Football Club.

It was reported preseason that The Vics, by changing their name to the North Adelaides, seemed to have frightened all their men away, and the Club that once fought such tough battles with the premier Clubs will this season be absolutely last. They have gradually been coming down the tree, until they have now reached the bottom, and afraid they will find it difficult at times to raise a team. Their old friend Warren has still stuck to them, and tries hard to keep his men together in spite of all the difficulties he has had to contend with, he is a fine follower, but will be at a loss this season in baring no one to back him. They have lost Kirkpatrick, Bushby, Chandler, and Sharp, who have joined other teams, Colgan and Cock, who have left the colony, and A. Slight and Brown, who do not intend to play. Their ranks have thus been badly thinned, and heard of no players of any prominence helping them out of their difficulty. They will still be with Taylor, Watson, and Presgrave, and Downs, Bagot, and Hubble to assist them.

The club struggled to compete against the other senior clubs and in its final two seasons as North Adelaide and collected the wooden spoon on both occasions. The club's last game was at Kensington Oval vs Norwood on 27 Sep 1884, which was a loss. Two weeks earlier, the "Tigers" had their only win of the 1884 season, an upset victory over Norwood Football Club who had been SAFA premiers for the previous five seasons by 4 goals 4 behinds to 2 goals 10 behinds.

== 1884 Annual General Meeting ==
On Tuesday, March 25, 1884 the annual meeting of the North Adelaide Football Club was held at the Huntsman's Hotel, North Adelaide. About fifty members were present and Mr. B. Whitfield occupied the chair. The treasurer reported a balance about £5 in hand, also a sum of £8 to the credit of the accident fund.

The election of officers for the ensuing year resulted as follows - Patrons, Mr. W. Bundey (Mayor of Adelaide); president, Dr. Nesbitt. A large number of vice presidents, Captain, F. Wedd; vice- captain, G. Taylor; Secretary, R. Whitfield; assistant secretary, J. Presgrave; treasurer. B. J. Furnell; Committee — Messrs. G. Downs, C. Pleass, J.Minney, and C. Warren; association delegates, Messrs. B. Whitfield and F. Wedd.

Several new members were elected, including four players from the Victorian colony, and several junior players from other clubs.

== 1885 Annual General Meeting and Resignation from SAFA ==
On Thursday evening 9 April 1885 the annual meeting of the North Adelaide Football Club was held at the Huntsman's Hotel, North Adelaide. There was a small attendance and Mr. G. Bickle presided. The secretary, Mr. K. Whitfield, read the annual report. The balance-sheet showed a debit balance of £5 17s 6d. It was decided that the club should continue its connection with the South Australian Football Association, and a committee was appointed to secure playing members. Mr. W. Osborne offered to contribute £5 to the funds of the club with a view to furthering its interests, on condition that another contribution of a like amount was promised. The offer was received with applause, and £7 was raised in the room within a few minutes.

The election of officers for the ensuing year resulted as follows: — Patrons, Mr. E. W. Hawker. M.P., President, Mr. W. Osborne: vice presidents, Dr. Stirling, M.P., Dr. Jay, Mr. W. Gilbert, M.P., Mr. W. H. Beaglehole, M. P., Councillors Downs and Stevenson, Messrs. W. Stratton, J. Watkins, F. Downes, J. G. Osborne, G. Bickle, D. Braidwood, T. Meelin. W. Connell, W. F. Long, M. Middleston. E. G. Phillips, and Upton; treasurer, Mr. B. Furnell : secretary, W. Salsberg; association delegates, Messrs. R. Whitfield, B. Furnell, J. Braidwood, W. Salsberg, and T. Rees; general committee, the secretary, treasurer, captain, vice-captain, and Messrs. G. Downes, R. Whitfield, and T. Rees.

On Monday evening 20 April 1885, a special meeting of the club was held at the Oxford Hotel, North Adelaide.

On Tuesday evening 21 April 1885, the club tendered its resignation to the South Australia Football Association, where it was accepted.

A number of the prominent players joined the newly formed senior Adelaide Club (formed from a merger of North Adelaide Junior and North Park Clubs) for the 1885 SAFA season and several of their other players joined the Hotham Club from the Adelaide and Suburban Association.

== Honour roll ==
Club honour roll
Victorian (pre SAFA)
Year	Pos	Games	Wins	Losses	Draws	Goals For	Goals Against	Captain	Leading goalkicker
1874		5	2	2	1	2	4		
1875		9	6	1	2	23	4		
1876	1 (Premiers)	9	6	2	1	17	8		
Victorian (SAFA)
Year	Pos	Games	Wins	Losses	Draws	Goals For	Goals Against	Captain	Leading goalkicker
1877	=1 (Joint Premiers)	14	10	1	3	30	5	George Downs	
1878	4th	11	4	3	4	10	6	George Downs	
1879	4th	11	4	5	2	11	8		
1880	2nd (Runner Up)	10	5	2	3	12	6		
1881	4th	13	4	5	4	8	15		
1882	4th	14	4	8	2	24–68	34–127		Taylor (10)
North Adelaide (SAFA)
1883	5th (Wooden Spoon)	15	2	11	2	18–63	46–175	Chas. E. Warren	
1884	5th (Wooden Spoon)	12	1	10	1	11–45	54–157	F. Wedd	Ewers (17)

== Notable players ==
William Bushby played for the club in 1882 as an 18 year old before transferring to Port Adelaide the following season were he became their captain in 1886 and twice a premiership (1884 and 1890) player before then joining South Adelaide in 1892 for two seasons. He was also a strong long distance swimmer and one of the founders of the South Australia Amateur Swimming Association, of which he was a life member.

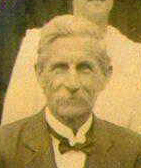
George Downs

George Edward Downs was captain of the club and South Australia's first captain. He also became a First Class Cricket umpire and a test umpire for one test in 1892.

William Knill - described as a dashing back man whose play was rarely surpassed also played Cricket for South Australia.

Frank Marlow was a player who became a long-serving administrator as secretary of South Adelaide Football Club and of the South Australian National Football League (SANFL); most likely his brother Alf Marlow as well; both transferred to South Adelaide after moving house to Gilles Street, Adelaide.

== Honours ==
- Interclub Competition (1): 1876 (Kensington Rules)
- List of SANFL premiers (1): 1877, Inaugural SAFA Club Champion shared with South Adelaide
