= William Knill =

Australian cricketer

Personal information
- Born: 28 January 1859; Prospect, South Australia
- Died: 8 July 1940 (aged 81); North Adelaide, South Australia
- Source: Cricinfo, 12 August 2020

William Knill (28 January 1859 – 8 July 1940) was an Australian cricketer. He played in six first-class matches for South Australia between 1880 and 1888.

Knill also played Australian Rules Football for the Victorian Club, based in North Adelaide, in the South Australian Football Association. He was a member of the inaugural premiership team in 1877 and was described as a dashing back man whose play was rarely surpassed. He was known for his speed, marking ability and long kicking in the early years of the SA Football Association.

In 1880 he was a guest player for Norwood in five matches against leading Victorian clubs in Melbourne.

== Personal Life and Death ==
Knill was junior secretary of the Prospect Sunday School in 1882, and later associated with the Archer Street Church.

He died on the 8th of July 1940 aged 81 years, at his residence, 61 Childers street, North Adelaide.

== See also ==
- List of South Australian representative cricketers
