= Billy Dedman =

Australian rules footballer (1854–1920)

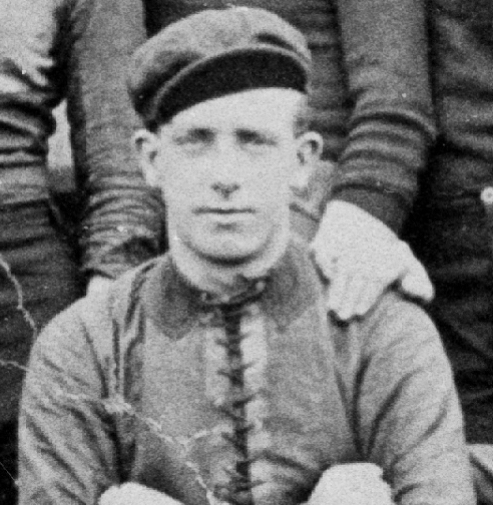
- Dedman wearing his Norwood guernsey in 1879

Personal information
- Full name: William Hine James Dedman
- Nickname: Doddy
- Born: 10 September 1854; Campbell Town, Van Diemen's Land
- Died: 24 July 1920 (aged 65); East Melbourne, Victoria
- Original team: Carlton United

Playing career
Years	Club	Games (Goals)
1871, 1873–1876	Carlton	42 (22)
1877, 1880	South Adelaide	20 (16)
1878–1880	Norwood	23 (19)
Total		85 (57)

Career highlights
- 4x Carlton premiership player (1871, 1873–1875); Victorian leading goal-kicker (1876); SAFA leading goal-kicker (1877); South Adelaide premiership player (1877); 3x Norwood premiership player (1878–1880); 2x Norwood leading goal-kicker (1878–1879); 2x South Adelaide leading goal-kicker (1877, 1880)

William Hine James Dedman (10 September 1854 – 24 July 1920) was an Australian rules footballer for Carlton in the pre-VFA era and for South Adelaide and Norwood in the SAFA.

In 1876, whilst playing for Carlton, he kicked 18 goals across all matches, the most in the colony of Victoria for the year.
