= George Downs (umpire) =

Australian cricket umpire (1856–1936)

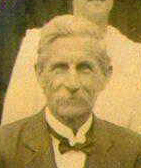

Personal information
- Full name: George Edward Downs
- Born: 25 July 1856; North Adelaide, South Australia
- Died: 2 April 1936 (aged 79); North Adelaide, South Australia

Umpiring information
- Tests umpired: 1 (1892–1892)
- FC umpired: 13 (1892–1903)
- Source: ESPNcricinfo, 6 December 2025

George Edward Downs (25 July 1856 – 2 April 1936) was an Australian Test cricket umpire and Australian rules footballer who represented the South Australian Football Association.

== Life and career ==
Downs was born and died in North Adelaide, where he lived all his life. He went to school there at Whinham College. He worked as a carpenter and undertaker.

== Cricket career ==
Downs played senior Adelaide cricket before becoming an umpire. He umpired 19 first-class matches between 1892 and 1903.

He umpired one Test match between Australia and England in Adelaide on 24 March to 28 March 1892, standing with William Oswald Whitridge, who was also umpiring his only Test. England captained by W. G. Grace won easily by an innings and 230 runs – the largest Test victory margin to that date.

== Football career ==
Downs was also prominent in the early days of Australian rules football in Adelaide. He was one of the founders in 1874 of the Victorians team of North Adelaide, which competed in the SAFA. He captained them for eight seasons before the club folded at the end of the 1884 season. They won the premiership under his captaincy in 1877. He captained the Victorians against a team from Melbourne in 1877, in South Australia's first interstate football match. Two days later he played for a combined South Australian team against Victoria. In 1879 he also represented South Australia in the first intercolonial match against Victoria in Melbourne.

== Personal life ==
Downs married Fanny Howard in North Adelaide in November 1881. He died at home in Ward Street, North Adelaide, on 2 April 1936, aged 79. Fanny and two sons and two daughters survived him; one son predeceased him. Fanny died in 1954, aged 96.
