= Montefiore Hill =

Hill in North Adelaide, South Australia

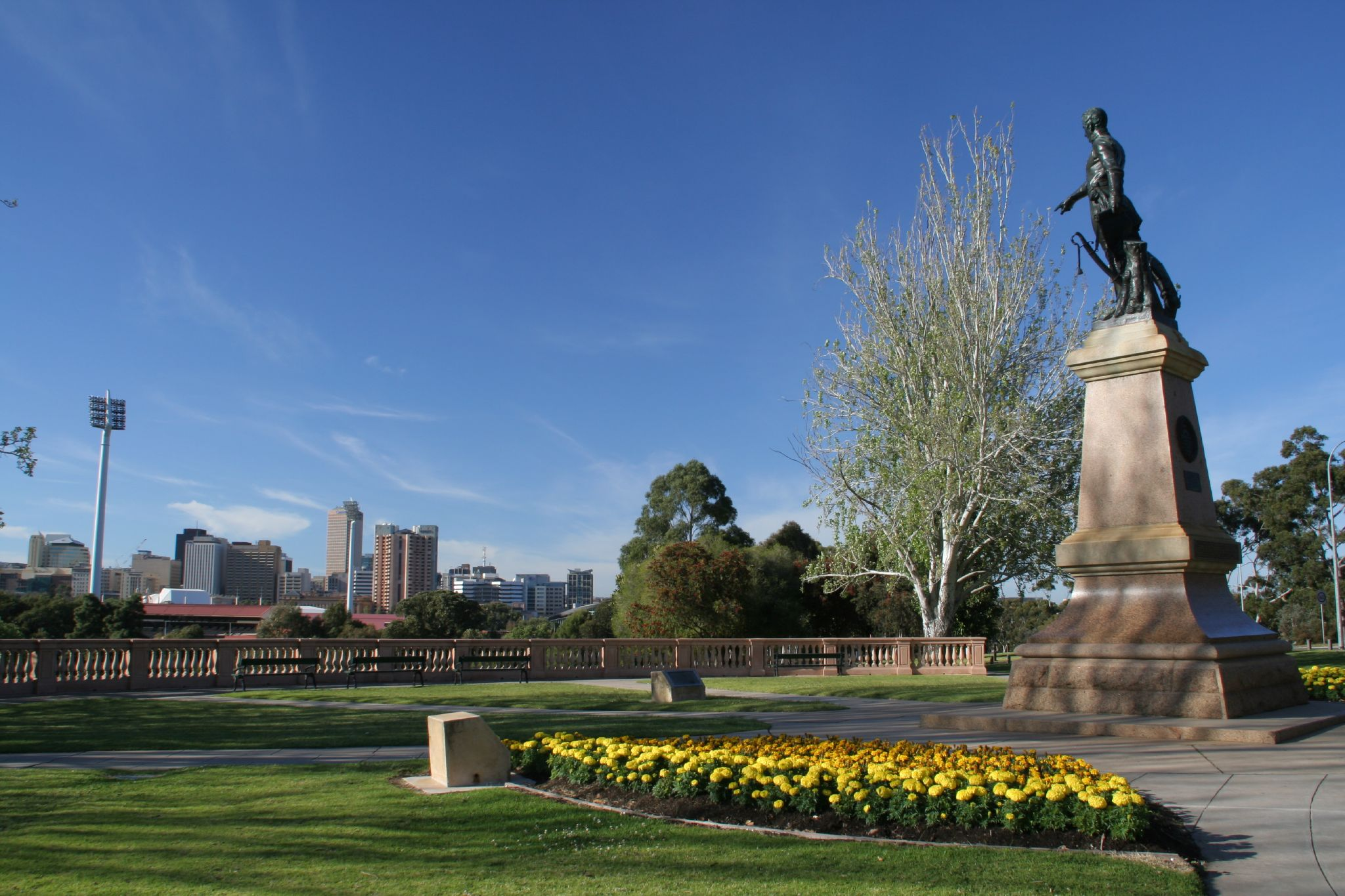
- The Light's Vision statue in 2006
- Interactive map of Montefiore Hill
- Type: Hill and landscaped lookout
- Location: North Adelaide, South Australia, Australia
- Coordinates: 34.9128°S 138.5940°E
- Etymology: Jacob Barrow Montefiore
- Operator: City of Adelaide

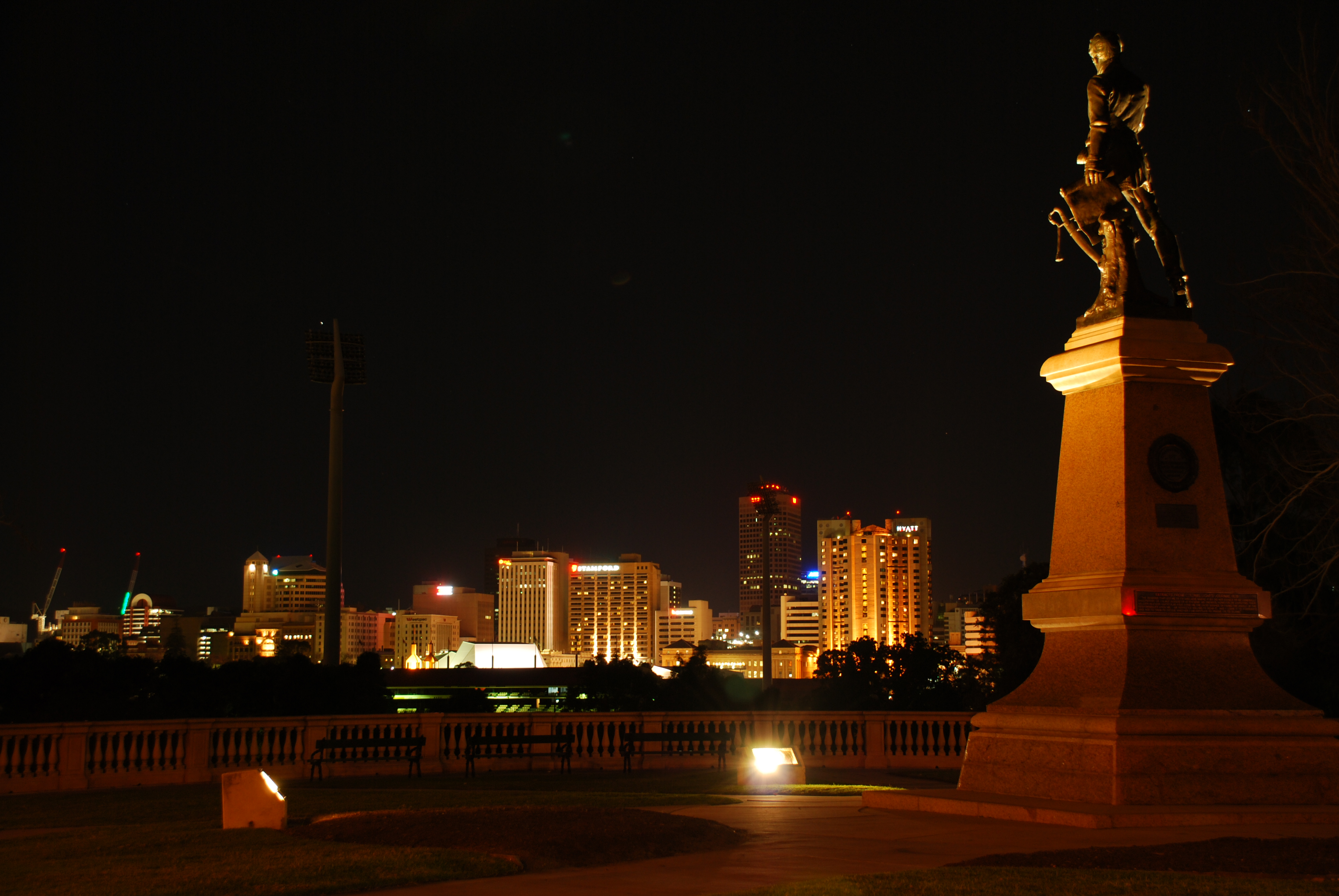
The Light's Vision commemoration at Montefiore Hill in North Adelaide, at night

Montefiore Hill is a small hill in North Adelaide, South Australia, which affords a view over the Adelaide city centre.

== Location and description ==
The hill lies within the northern Adelaide Parklands, within the area known as Park 26: Adelaide Oval/Tarntanya Wama park. It is at the northern end of Montefiore Road, near its junction with a small road known as Montefiore Hill.

The site is well known as the location of Light's Vision, a statue of founder and planner of Adelaide William Light, positioned in such a way that his finger points towards the Adelaide city centre. The view across the city has been somewhat impeded by the development of the Adelaide Oval in 2012–2013. The statue is surrounded by paving, lawns and garden, after the statue was moved there and the surrounding area developed as a lookout in 1939. It offers a vantage point over the Oval, Memorial Drive Tennis Courts, the northern sections of the parklands, and the city.

== History ==
=== 1837: Naming ===
The name was given to the hill in 1837 to honour Jacob Barrow Montefiore (1801–1895), one of the Colonization Commissioners for South Australia and a cousin of British philanthropist Moses Montefiore. It was named by the committee of prominent colonists in the South Australian Company who had named all of the main streets and squares of Adelaide on 23 May 1837.

=== 1936: Development ===
The lookout was developed as part of the 1936 centenary celebrations, a project in which the top of the hill was levelled, and the area landscaped with gardens and paving with a curved balustrade on its southern side.

=== 1938: Light's Vision ===
A larger redevelopment was suggested in 1938, when Sir Henry Newland proposed redesigning and expanding the levelled area, as well as moving the statue of Light from its position at the northern end of Victoria Square in the city centre, and renaming it Light's Vision. The redevelopment plan was not proceeded with, but the moving and renaming of the statue was carried out in May 1938.

The name Light's Vision is now sometimes applied to the whole lookout.
