= Kensington Football Club =

Australian rules football club

Kensington

Names
- Full name: Kensington Football Club

Club details
- Founded: 1871
- Dissolved: 6 April 1886
- Colours: Scarlet white
- Competition: Interclub 1871-1876, SAFA 1877-1881; Adelaide and Suburban Assoc. 1882-1885
- Premierships: Interclub 1873-1875
- Ground: Kensington Oval

Uniforms
Home

The Kensington Football Club was an Australian rules football club based at Kensington in Adelaide's eastern suburbs and played an integral part in the game's development in the colony of South Australia. The club's rules used in South Australia were referred to as the "Kensington Rules". The club was one of the founding teams of the South Australian Football Association (later renamed the SANFL) in 1877. The club uniform consisted of a scarlet cap and jacket with white trousers.

== Early Interclub Games ==
A game was played on Saturday 20 August 1871 between 16 members of the Old Adelaide Football Club and 20 of the Kensington Club on the grounds of the latter, situated a short distance eastward of the Marryatville Hotel. There was a large group of spectators present and the Concordia Band who had accompanied the Adelaide Club discoursed excellent music throughout the afternoon. The only goal was scored by Adelaide.

On Saturday afternoon at 3pm, 3 September 1871, the return match between the Adelaide (Blue) and Kensingtons (Pink) Clubs was played on the North Park Lands. A large number of visitors from city and suburbs attended, partly attracted by the fine weather and Schrader's Band. The Adelaideans, who were captained by E. W. Aldridge, had 16 players in their team, whilst the Kensingtons; under the command of E. H. Hallack, mustered 20. After an hour's play Kensington scored the first goal and it was close to 6pm (dusk) when Adelaide then scored and were declared the victors as a result of their goal in the first game.

== Kensington Oval ==
A meeting of the Kensington Football and Cricket Clubs was held at the Town Hall, Norwood, on Tuesday evening, 1 July 1873, to consider the advisability of amalgamating, the two Clubs for the purposes of buying, the ground forming the proposed Oval. There was a large attendance, and Mr. L. Glyde, M.P., presided. The objects of the meeting were fully discussed, and a unanimous expression of opinion given in favor of the proposed action being taken.

At annual meeting of the Kensington Cricket, Football and Athletic Association was held at the Norwood Town Hall on Friday evening, 27 November 1874 — the Hon. L. Glyde, M.P., President, in the chair it was reported that the property of the Association consists of 20 acres in Kensington Park. Of this an Oval of five acres in the centre of the block has been carefully laid out and planted with couch grass at the small cost of £68. The grass has grown remarkably well, in most parts completely covering the ground.

From an area originally known as Shipsters Paddock, Kensington Oval was officially opened for play on Saturday afternoon, 10 July 1875 by the Hon. L. Glyde, the President of the Kensington Athletic Association.

== SAFA Inaugural Season (1877) ==
An article published on 16 June 1877 in the Evening Journal reported:

The Kensington Football Club held an extraordinary meeting at Mr. Caterer's schoolroom, Norwood, on Thursday evening, June 7, 1877 at which Mr. Bay Moulden occupied the chair. The attendance was fair, and 15 new members were elected. After considerable discussion about the costume, it was decided that scarlet and white striped guernseys, round striped military caps, and white trousers be substituted for the old one, and it was also resolved that the wearing of it be strictly enforced after the 16th instant. Mr. Peter Wood was elected captain for the remainder of the season, and Mr. Bayfield Moulden vice-captain.

In consequence of the number of members being so great, a second twenty was formed, and Mr. A. Caterer was appointed Secretary of the second team and also an ex officio member of the Committee.

== Merger with Old Adelaide Club and Resignation from SAFA (1881) ==
For the 1881 SAFA season Kensington merged with Old Adelaide Football Club. The first meeting of the merged club was held on Monday 11 April 1881 at the Prince Alfred Hotel. It was decided that the colour of the club be black and scarlet guernsey, hose, and cap, and navy blue knickerbockers.

After the first 4 games the merged side of Adelaide-Kensington had lost all their games and only had scored the one goal. Following the fourth defeat by seven goals to nil against South Park on their home ground the club held a meeting and decided to disband.

The merged Adelaide-Kensington Football Club resigned from the senior association on 1 June 1881.

The last reported game of the combined Adelaide-Kensington was played on the Queen and Albert Oval (Alberton Oval), Saturday, 25 June, between the first twenty of the Ports (17) and a combined team of Adelaides-cum-Kensingtons (20). The game was not commenced till 3.40pm in consequence of each team having to take on some substitutes. The game throughout was played in a very friendly spirit. The Adelaides-cum-Kensingtons strove hard to avert defeat, but their opponents played better together, and were in very good form. Port Adelaide winning 8 goals 25 behinds to Nil.

== Kensington Football Club Post SAFA Resignation (1881) ==
Following the resignation of the combined Adelaide-Kensington senior team from the SAFA, Kensington organised a number of matches against non SAFA Clubs including North Park and Unley. On the Public Holiday Monday 8 August 1881, Kensington visited Mount Barker in the Adelaide Hills where the result was a draw - Kensington 1 goal 6 behinds to Mount Barker 1 goal 5 behinds.

== Annual Sports Day and General Meeting (1881) ==
A general meeting of the Kensington Football Club was held on evening of Wednesday 23 November 1881 at the Imperial Hotel, when Mr. C. W. Mudie on behalf of the club presented Mr. James Lyall with a musical album, as a token of esteem for his past services as secretary during the football season and in connection with the annual sports held on 29 October.

== Adelaide and Suburban Football Association (1882-1886) ==
From 1882 the Football Club had joined the Adelaide and Suburban Football Association and continued to play football matches from the 1882 Season and also held Athletic Sports Days.

Adjourned 1882 Annual Meeting of the Football Club was advertised to be held at the Prince Alfred Hotel on Thursday, 16 March, at 8 p.m. All members and intending members were requested to attend.

The opening colour match of the club's 1883 season was played on the old Adelaide Ground with 46 members taking part in the game.

A friendly reunion match of the old Kensington and new Kensington members was held on Saturday 29 September 1883. The Old Kensington winning 8 goals to 2.

The 1884 Annual General Meeting of the Kensington Football Club was held In the Prince Alfred Hotel on Wednesday evening. 20 March. Mr. A. Thomas occupied the chair, and there was a good attendance in which fifteen new members were elected.

At the 1885 Annual Meeting the secretaries of the Kensington Cricket, Football, and Athletic Association and the Norwood Club wrote, offering the association a silver cup of the value of £25 for competition among the clubs belonging to on the following terms - That it be called the Norwood and Kensington junior football challenge.

At the 1886 Annual meeting of the Adelaide and Suburban Football Association held on Tuesday evening, 6 April 1886 at the Prince Alfred Hotel, the retirement of Kensington from the association was announced and a new team called Kensington Parks was admitted. The Secretary of the Club Mr. W.R. Burton had been reluctantly compelled to place the Club's resignation in the hands of Mr. W. J. Hill the Secretary of the Association as it been found impossible to make up a team.
