= Old Adelaide Football Club =

Former Australian rules football club

Adelaide

Names
- Full name: Adelaide Football Club

Club details
- Founded: 26 April 1860
- Dissolved: 4 April 1881; 145 years ago
- Colours: black, red
- Competition: Interclub competition 1869-72, 1875-76; SAFA 1877-1880
- Premierships: Interclub competition (3): 1869,1871-1872
- Ground: North Park Lands (1860-1880) (now University Oval, Adelaide)

Uniforms
Home
- Guernsey: Adelaide (1877-1880)

Adelaide-Kensington

Names
- Full name: Adelaide-Kensington Football Club

Club details
- Founded: 11 April 1881
- Dissolved: 1 June 1881; 145 years ago
- Colours: black, red , navy blue
- Competition: SAFA 1881
- Ground: North Park Lands (1881) (now University Oval, Adelaide)

Uniforms
Home
- Guernsey: Adelaide-Kensington (1881)

The Adelaide Football Club, often referred to as the Old Adelaide Football Club, was an Australian rules football club based in Adelaide. Founded on 26 April 1860, it was the first football club formed in South Australia.

From 1860 to 1872 the club played what appears to be a game a cross between association football and rugby using a round ball. Adelaide was the premier team in interclub competition in 1869 and 1871–72.

At a meeting of the Adelaide Football Club held at Lloyd's Coffee Booms on Wednesday 7th April 1869, with about a dozen members present, the rules were considered and amended in several instances, the most material alteration being that in future the ball should be kicked over instead of under the crossbar of the goal.

The club played interclub football in South Australia until 1873, when it had disputes with Kensington and Port Adelaide over standardizing the rules, but resumed interclub matches in 1875 under its former rules when they were revived by a number of other clubs.

In 1876, the Adelaide Club rules were adopted by all the South Australian clubs at a meeting organised by Charles Kingston from the South Adelaide Football Club, and in 1877, the Adelaide club captain Richard Twopeny called an initial meeting which led to the formation of the South Australian Football Association (SAFA) and participated in the competition from 1877 to 1880. The club uniform was black and red scarlet striped jersey, hose, and cap, and white knickerbockers.

For the 1881 SAFA season the Old Adelaide Football Club merged with Kensington Football Club. The first meeting of the merged Adelaide-Kensington Football Club was held on Monday 11 April 1881 at the Prince Alfred Hotel. It was decided that the colour of the club be black and scarlet guernsey, hose, and cap, and navy blue knickerbockers. After the first 4 games the merged side of Adelaide-Kensington had lost all their games and only had scored the one goal. Following the fourth defeat by seven goals to nil against South Park on their home ground the club held a meeting and decided to disband.

The merged Adelaide-Kensington Football Club resigned from the SAFA on 1 June 1881. Despite Adelaide-Kensington resigning from the SAFA. A match was advertised and played on the Queen and Albert Oval (Alberton Oval), Saturday, June 25, between the first twenty of the Ports (17) and a combined team of Adelaides-cum-Kensingtons (20). The game was not commenced till 3.40pm in consequence of each team having to take on some substitutes. The game throughout was played in a very friendly spirit. Result - Port Adelaide defeated Adelaide-Kensington 8 goals 25 behinds to Nil

The old Adelaide Football Club (SAFA 1877–1881) has no connection to the Adelaide Football Club (SAFA 1885–1893) which was formed from a merger of the North Adelaide Junior (renamed Adelaide in 1884) and North Parks Clubs from the Adelaide and Suburban Association. Both of these former Adelaide Clubs in the SAFA have no relationship to the Adelaide Football Club currently playing in the Australian Football League (AFL) or to the Adelaide Reserves in the South Australian National Football League (SANFL).

== History ==
=== Background ===
In 1854 Adelaide businessman John Acraman imported five round footballs from England and paid for the construction of goal posts at St Peter's College in Adelaide's eastern suburbs. St Peter's football matches were played between Frome Road and Adelaide Bridge using the Harrow School rules (a blend of modern-day association football and rugby), on a similar site to the current University Oval. In the following years the interest in football in South Australia began to grow with reports of matches being played across the state becoming more common.

=== Formation at Globe Inn Hotel ===
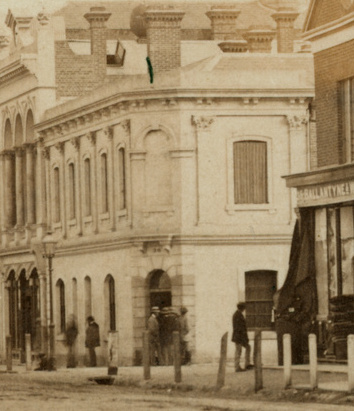
The club was founded at the Globe Inn Hotel, Rundle Street (c. 1860)

On 25 April 1860 an advertisement in the South Australian Register appeared notifying the Adelaide public about an upcoming meeting the following evening at 7pm to form a football club. The advertisement, sponsored by John Acraman, W.J. Fullarton and R. Cussen noted that group had already gathered 30 members.

On Thursday 26 April 1860 the Adelaide Football Club was formed at the Globe Inn Hotel, Rundle Street with John Brodie Spence chairing the meeting. It was thereby the first football club established in South Australia.

=== Early intra-club years (1860–1861) ===
==== 1860 ====
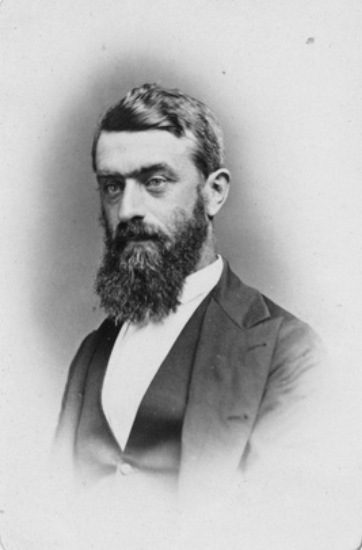
Thomas O'Halloran served as club chairman, secretary and captain at different times during the clubs first four years of existence.

The club played its first intra-club match on the North Park Lands of Adelaide on 28 April 1860. The captains for this match were J.B. Spence and John Acraman. This first game lasted nearly 3 hours.

The club initially only played internal matches between players located North and South of the River Torrens.

The fourth meeting took place on the South Park Lands on 19 May 1860 with coloured uniforms adopted. The team from players North of the River Torrens wore blue caps and the side south wore pink caps. For this match the captains were Thomas O'Halloran (Note: Most likely T. J. S. O'Halloran, who was a prominent "old boy" of St Peter's College. His son T. S. O'Halloran, the prominent SAFL executive, was only 5 years old in 1860.) and R. Cussen.

By mid June 1860 the club had already grown to over 100 members, including four members of the South Australian parliament.

The final game for 1860 attracted 200 spectators. John Acraman was again captain of one side and Thomas O'Halloran the other. North Adelaide would win by one goal.

==== 1861 ====
The clubs first annual general meeting since the clubs formation was, again, held at the Globe Inn Hotel on 10 April 1861. At this meeting James MacGeorge was elected as club chairman.

The first intra-club match for the club in 1861, delayed by a week, occurred on 27 April. Thomas O'Halloran and John Acraman were chosen as captains for this match. Thomas O'Halloran's side wore blue and John Acraman's side wore pink. Thomas O'Halloran's side won 2–0.

The club scheduled a training session on the North Park Lands for 11 May. However, due to rain they cancelled.

The second intra-club match for the club in 1861, played on the North Park Lands as usual, was advertised for 18 May as pitting the "Past and Present Collegians" in blue against "The other Members of the Club" in pink. However, the post game report described an inter-club match featuring the Adelaide Football Club playing against "the College boys". Present at this match were, amongst others, Richard Graves MacDonnell (Governor of South Australia), Augustus Short (Lord Bishop of Adelaide), James Farrell (Anglican Dean of Adelaide), James Hurtle Fisher (President of the South Australian Legislative Council), John Morphett (Chief Secretary of South Australia), Henry Ayers (South Australian Legislative Council). For this match Mr. Cooper was selected as captain of the pink team and Thomas O'Halloran captain of the blue team. Each team had 25 players and the game resulted in a 0–0 draw.

The third intra-club match for the club in 1861 was scheduled to take place on 1 June on the North Park Lands. However, due to a rowing event in Port Adelaide and a college archery practice, the match was postponed. The third intra-club match for the club in 1861 eventually took place on 10 August between a college side, captained by Thomas O'Halloran, and a non-college side, captained by Mr Cooper. The college side won 2–0. During this match a horse ran through the field of play.

=== Early years of inter-club football (1862–1872) ===
==== 1862 ====
The first recorded match against a rival club was played in 1862 against the Modbury and Teatree Gully Football Club on a strip of grass near the Modbury Hotel. Adelaide won the game two goals to nil. The two teams met again the next year, and "the game was kept up with the greatest spirit and good feeling, and so equally were the sides matched that not a goal was obtained".

In another internal game held on 14 June 1862 after some postponement, the Pink team comprised St Peter's Collegians, Thomas O'Halloran, and the remainder were Blues, captained by C. D. Cooper.

==== 1863 ====
During the final stages of the last match of the 1863 season between Adelaide and the Modbury and Teatree Gully Football Club some Indigenous Australians were allowed to participate for both sides. The newspaper described the indigenous players by saying their "manoeuvres were ludicrous in the extreme".

==== 1864 ====
In 1864 the club produced printed copies of their rules to avoid disputes. The club hosted a 'Town and Country' match in 1864.

==== 1867 ====
On 31 August 1867 the club played a match against a team from the 50th Regiment on the North Park Lands. The Adelaide club won 3–0.

==== 1868 ====
A match was played on 13 June 1868 between Adelaide and a local Collegian side with the latter winning.

The yearly bag, made up by the ladies in and about Adelaide, match was played at Woodville and contested by 15 members of the Adelaide and 20 of the Port Adelaide and Suburban Football Club. The bag contained a variety of useful and ornamental articles, and the match for which it is played was generally considered the most interesting of any during the season, and the most keenly contested. The following were the advertised players on the Adelaide side : Horn, Malcolm, Aldridge, Gwynne, Kingston, Samson, Considine, Taylor, Sparks, Crooks, Smith, Milne, O'Halloran, Holland, and Price.

==== 1869 ====
On Saturday 29 May 1869 on Park Lands at Gawler a match was played between 15 members of the Adelaide Football Club and a like number of the Gawler Football Club with Adelaide winning by 3 goals to nil. Captains - Messrs. Sparks (Adelaide) and Sandland (Gawler).

==== 1870 ====
The annual meeting of the Adelaide Football Club was held at the Prince Alfred Hotel, on Thursday afternoon, 28 April 1870. There was a fair attendance, and Mr. W. Pope occupied the chair. The Treasurer's balance-sheet and report were adopted. The election of Secretary was deferred till the first meeting for practice; Mr. W. Samson consented to act pro tem. Messrs. Malcolm, Samson, C. C. Kingston, and Pope were appointed a Committee; and the subscription was fixed at 7s. 6d. The opening game was arranged for the first Saturday in May. A vote of thanks to Mr. H. Y. Sparks (the Hon. Secretary) and the Committee was passed, as also a similar compliment to the Chairman. Several new members were proposed.

The opening game of football in connection with the Adelaide Club was played on Saturday afternoon, May 14. There were about 30 members present, and Messrs. E. Samson (North - Colours pink) and E. Aldridge (South - Colours blue) acted as captains. The ball selected was of the Rugby or oval shape, and it required a considerable amount of skill to play it with any degree of success. It was set in motion about 3 o'clock, and after some, spirited play two goals were secured by the blues. The pinks nearly secured one, but the ball having struck the cross-rope, it was decided against them. There was a large attendance of spectators.

On Saturday afternoon 11 June 1870 a football match was played between the Adelaide and Woodville Clubs on the ground of the latter. Messrs. Malcolm (Adelaide - blue) and Cave (Woodville - pink) were Captains of the respective teams, which each numbered 14 players, and there was a fair attendance of spectators. The ground was in good condition owing to the late seasonable weather, and the day being fine it proved a favourable one for the match. The ball was kicked off by the blues at about 3 o'clock, and before long Sparks gained a goal for that side. Baker (blue) after some excellent play had taken place, scored another goal for his side, and before long Conigrave gained another. At 5 o'clock the game was concluded, and the members of the Adelaide Club returned to town by rail.
The following were the selected players: — Adelaide— Malcolm, Warburton, Sparks, E. Aldridge, Baker, W. and K. Samson, Masters, S. and C. Kingston, Townsend, J.Milne. H. Conigrave, Murray, and Dele. "Woodville— Formby, Slater, Dale, Crooks, Brock, Green, Cave, Stephens, Fergusson, Hart, Gardiner, Smith, Formby, Hovrell, and Martin.

In 1870 the club lost many of its best players to the newly formed city club Young Australians.

==== 1871 ====
The opening game of football for the season was played in the afternoon Saturday 15 April 1871, on the North Park Lands, between the Adelaide and Port Adelaide Clubs, the Concordia Band having been engaged. The following were the twenty Adelaide players selected: — Messrs. Aldridge, Brock, Conigrave, Colley, Chambers, Calf, Dale, Dalton, Higgins, Harrison, Jackson, Milne, Masters, Monteith, Nesbit, Randall, Sharpe, Sparks, Townsend, and Watson.

On 27 May 1871 it was reported His Excellency the Governor consented to take the office of President of this Club, and Lieutenant Fergusson (Private Secretary) purposed joining as a member.

==== 1872 ====
1872 Interclub matches against Kensington and Port Adelaide were played with the club winning 4 games and drawing 2 and therefore being the Premier Club.
June 15 – Kensington (0) drew with Adelaide (0) (Crowd: 400)
June 29 - Adelaide (4) def Port Adelaide (0)
July 13 – Adelaide (1) def Kensington (0)
July 27 - Adelaide (0) drew with Port Adelaide (0)
August 6 - Adelaide (1) def Kensington (0)
September 7 – Adelaide (1) def Port Adelaide (0)

=== Interclub Exile over the games rules (1873–1874) ===
A meeting of the delegates from the Adelaide, Kensington, and Port Adelaide Football Clubs was held at the Prince Alfred Hotel, on Saturday evening, March 10, for the purpose of drawing up a standard code of playing roles. There were present Messrs. C. C. Kingston, Winzor, and Perkins, from the Adelaide Club; Messrs. Crooks, H. B. Perry, and B. Moulden, from the Kensington Club; and Messrs. W. Townsend, G. Ireland, and Bann, from the Port Adelaide Club. Mr. Kingston, who was voted to the chair, having explained the object of the meeting, the business was gone into, and after the various rules were discussed seriatim, a code was drawn up somewhat similar to the rules of the English Football Association.

The adjourned general meeting of the Adelaide Football Club was held at the Prince Alfred Hotel on Tuesday evening, May 13, 1873. There was a small attendance, and Mr. H. Y. Sparks presided. The representatives appointed to confer with delegates from the Kensington and Port Suburban Football Clubs laid on the table a code of rules for the regulation of matches which had been agreed to on Saturday evening. After some slight discussion it was resolved to, as is elsewhere announced, adjourn the meeting to Thursday evening, when the Club will be asked to confirm the code, and regulations for the management of general business will be submitted. We understand that many of the old supporters of the Adelaide Football Club — an institution which has been established for several years — are rallying round it, and that strenuous efforts are being made to ensure a successful season. The Committee are anxious to establish the game in this colony on a firm foundation, and to supply an acknowledged want by forming a proper set of playing rules. The attendance of all gentlemen interested in football is specially desired at the adjourned meeting.

By 1873, the Kensington club rules became popular amongst the other clubs, along with attempts at standardisation. After Adelaide's attempts to retain their rules were rebuffed by Kensington and Port Adelaide, they went into recess with interclub until 1875.

=== 1873 ===
It was reported on Saturday 10 May 1873 - A practice by the members 'of the Adelaide Football Club was held on the Club grounds on Saturday afternoon. There was not a very large muster, the more prominent supporters of the Club only putting in an appearance. It was not expected, however, that many members would engage in the first match, which was simply arranged as a preliminary : meeting to introduce the members to each others. The weather was well suited for football, and a number of onlookers being selected an the sides which were picked, an enjoyable game was played for about a couple of hours, which resulted in the players (Red) captained by Mr. C. D. Perkins gaining a goal against the Blues. There was a large attendance of spectators. We understand that it is proposed to play under revised rules, and to adopt what is known in England as the ' Off' and ' On' game, and that at a conference between the City and Suburban Clubs it will be sought to carry a resolution affirming the desirableness of introducing rules regulating the game.

=== 1874 ===
A meeting of members of the Adelaide Football Club was held at the Prince Alfred Hotel on Wednesday evening, May 6, to receive the reports for the last year, and make arrangements for the forthcoming season. There were about a dozen gentlemen present, and Mr. S. G. Kingston presided. It was resolved to ask His Excellency to accept the office of president, and Mr. J. Acraman that of vice-president.
Messrs. F. Aldridge, A. E. Ayers, R. Turner, and H. Holthouse were appointed a Committee, and Mr. S. G. Kingston Secretary and Treasurer. Several routine matters were referred to the committee, and the meeting adjourned. Upwards of 40 members were enrolled. The opening game was advertised to be played next Saturday.

On Saturday 9 May 1874 in the afternoon the Adelaide Football club played their opening game of the season. At an adjourned meeting it was reported that His Excellency Governor Musgrave had accepted the office of president ant that Mr J. Acraman had again intimated his willingness to accept the position of vice-president. A code of rules for the management of the club was adopted.

=== Return to the fold (1875) ===
After the clubs exile from inter club football in 1873 and 1874, the club had suffered significantly, and was no longer the premier football club. Adelaide had one win and a draw from its five its inter club fixtures for the season, finishing last. It was from this point in time that the club began to commonly be referred to as the Old Adelaide Football Club.

=== Club Re-established (3 August 1875) ===
The Adelaide Football Club, the first formal football club in South Australia was dissolved on the adoption of the Kensington Club rules and re-established when a meeting of gentlemen interested in football was held at the Prince Alfred Hotel, King William-street, on Tuesday evening, August 3, 1875. Mr. C. C. Kingston presided, and explained that the object of the meeting was to re-establish the old Adelaide Football Club. A resolution that the Society be re-established was carried, and a Committee, consisting of Messrs. H. T. Sparks, C. C. Kingston, J.Masters, and A. L. Giles, was elected. Mr. H. Conigrave was appointed Secretary and Treasurer. The annual subscription was fixed at 5s.

=== Adoption of Standard Rules by Clubs (20 July 1876) ===
On 20 July 1876, Charles Kingston, now Secretary of the new South Adelaide Football Club, organised a meeting at the old Prince Alfred Hotel and pleaded with the delegates of the other local clubs that the rules of the Old Adelaide club be universally adopted by South Australian clubs as they closely resembled those used in Victoria. Part of Charles Kingston's argument to adopt the old Adelaide Club rules over the Kensington Club rules was that by having rules similar to those being used in Melbourne, intercolonial football matches could be held in the future. By the end of the meeting Charles Kingston had his way and the old Adelaide Club rules were adopted by all the clubs.

=== Reformation of old Adelaide Football Club (28 July 1876) ===
A meeting, having for its object the reforming of the old Adelaide Football Club, was held at Kinderman's Restaurant, Rundle Street, on Friday evening, July 28. Mr. T. Wright occupied the chair. The following gentlemen were elected a committee : — Messrs.C. D. Perkins, R. E. Twopeny, Canaway, F.Bleechmore, and W. A. Hughes. Mr. H. Conigrave and Mr. W. E. Dalton were elected hon. secretary and hon. treasurer respectively. The amount of subscription was fixed, and matches under the new rules were arranged.

=== SAFA foundation club (1877) ===
In April 1877 Adelaide captain Nowell Twopenney was influential in calling for the establishment of the South Australian Football Association (SAFA). The club subsequently became one of the founding members of the SAFA (later renamed as the SANFL). In the SAFA's inaugural season, Adelaide finished third, winning 11 matches (one win by forfeit), losing three and drawing three, scoring a total of 31 goals and finishing with a positive goal differential of 18.

Adelaide finished fifth out of seven teams in each of the next two seasons, and last in 1880.

=== Merger with Kensington and resignation of old Adelaide from SAFA (1881) ===
Special meetings-of the members of the Kensington and Adelaide Football Clubs were held at the Prince Alfred Hotel on Monday 4 April.

The first general meeting of the recently amalgamated Adelaide and Kensington Football Clubs was held at the Prince Alfred Hotel on Monday evening, April 11. There was a large attendance of members, and Mr. T. A. Caterer, B.A., was voted to the chair. It was decided that the officers of both clubs should be joint officers of the amalgamated clubs. Messrs E. O. Moore and F. D. Phillips were elected. Joint Secretaries and Treasurers; and Messrs, C. W. Hughes, H. S. Wyatt, W. E. Dalton, J. D. Stephens, O. E. Herbert, and F. H. Clark committee. Messrs. T. A Caterer and E. O. Moore were appointed Association delegates, Messrs. C. W. Hughes, A. Harrison, F. D. Phillips to act with them at general meetings of the Association. For the management of the Second Twenty Messrs. C. E. B. Sabine and J. Lyall were elected Secretaries, and Messrs. B. Caterer, J. Boberts, and F. Poole committee. The election of captain and vice-captain in both teams was left to the Twenties. It was decided that the colour of the club be black-and scarlet guernsey, hose, and cap, and navy blue knickerbockers. The desirability of erecting a pavilion and otherwise improving the Kensington Oval was affirmed, and it was thought if an organized movement was started sufficient support could be obtained to carry it through. A vote of thanks to the Chairman closed the meeting.

A meeting of the Adelaide and Kensington Football Club was hold on Monday evening, May 30, at the Prince Alfred Hotel. There was a large number of members present. After a spirited discussion it was decided that in view of the gloomy prospects of the club, and its past ill-fortune, the club should be disbanded.

The team's poor performances forced the combined team to resign from the SAFA competition on 1 June 1881 after losing four matches and scoring just one goal.

It was reported on Saturday 11 June 1881 that endeavours are being made to induce that North Adelaide Juniors and the North Parks to amalgamate and apply to the Association for permission to take up the fixtures of the Adelaide and Kensington Club.

The last reported game of the combined Adelaide-Kensington was played on the Queen and Albert Oval (Alberton Oval), Saturday, June 25, between the first twenty of the Ports (17) and a combined team of Adelaides-cum-Kensingtons (20). The game was not commenced till 3.40pm in consequence of each team having to take on some substitutes. The game throughout was played in a very friendly spirit. The Adelaides-cum-Kensingtons strove hard to avert defeat, but their opponents played better together, and were in very good form. Port Adelaide winning 8 goals 25 behinds to Nil.

=== Annual Match with Gawler (1882) ===
Sixth Annual Game with the recently reformed Gawler Football Club was played on the afternoon Tuesday 20 June 1882 with 500 to 600 spectators present at the Gawler Recreation Ground. Punctually at 3 o'clock His Worship the Mayor (Mr. H. Dean), patron of the Gawler Club, started the ball for the Adelaides, but before kicking off each team gave three, hearty cheers for His Worship. The game resulted in a tie with each team scoring 1 goal and 5 behinds. Captains - Tardif (Gawler) and Wyatt (Old Adelaide). Best players for Old Adelaide - Wyatt, Evans, Wyatt, Moule, Moore, Shawyer, and Clark (goal scorer). After the gallant struggle with the Old Adelaide Club the Gawlers entertained the visitors at dinner at the Old Spot Hotel.

=== North Adelaide Junior Club renames to Adelaide (1884) ===
On 20 March 1884, a delegate for the North Adelaide Juniors was present at the Medindie Football Club Annual Meeting and proposed an amalgamation with the Medindies, which was respectfully declined. The Medindie Club would later join the SAFA in 1888 and rename to North Adelaide Football Club in 1893.

On Monday evening, 24 March 1884 North Adelaide Junior Club held its annual general meeting at the Prince Alfred Hotel. Mr. C. C. Cornish, one of the Vice Presidents, occupied the chair. There was an attendance of forty-one members, and it was decided to alter the name of the club to the Adelaide Football Club. Twelve new members were elected, and the report and balance sheet, showing a satisfactory credit balance, was read and adopted. Votes of thanks were passed to the retiring officers, and the following were elected as officers for the ensuing season :— Patron— Hon. G. C. Hawker. President— Mr. W. P. Wicksteed. Vice Presidents— Drs. Stirling, Nesbitt, and Jay, Messrs. W. J. Peterswald, J. F. Wiglev, C.C. Cornish, E. W. Hawker, H. Mildred, J.H. Parr. W. King, C. B. Young, J. H. Wicksteed, V. Lawrance, T. Evans, F. E. Bucknail, and A. Harvey. Secretary — A. Gill. Treasurer— G. M. Austey. Captain— G. M. Evan. Committee — Secretary, Treasurer, Captain, F. Fiveash, and F. Hamilton. Match Committee— Captain, P. S, Hocking, and R. E. P. Osborne.

=== Annual Dinner 1884 ===
The first annual dinner of the new Adelaide Football Club was held in the Parisian Cafe, Rundle-street, on Thursday evening 11 September 1884. Mr. W. P. Wicksteed presided, and Mr. E. W. Hawker, M.P., occupied the vice-chair. About forty sat down to dinner. Mr. J. D. Stephens, who, in a highly eulogistic speech, complimented the Adelaides on their position, and said he thought much of their success was due to the efforts of their Captain Mr. M. Evan and their Secretary Mr. Gill.

=== Merger with North Parks (1884–1885) ===
In 1884 the Adelaide Club finished in 2nd place (10 Wins 2 Losses) behind North Parks (11 Wins 1 Lost) who won the Adelaide and Suburban Junior Association Premiership. During the season the new Adelaide Club defeated Kensington 9 goals 19 behinds to 1 behind.

A meeting of delegates from the Adelaide (formerly North Adelaide Junior) and North Park (formed in 1878) Football Clubs was held on Thursday evening, 13 November 1884, to consider the desirability of amalgamation. A motion to amalgamate was passed, subject, however, to the final acceptance of the same by a majority of the whole of the members composing the joint clubs. The Adelaide and North Park Junior clubs consisted of a large number of ex collegians from both Prince Alfred and Saint Peters Colleges.

Following a well attended meeting at the Prince Albert Hotel on Thursday 5 March 1885 it was resolved the combined football clubs Adelaide and North Parks would enter two teams - senior portion as Adelaide in the SAFA and the junior as North Parks in Adelaide and Suburban Football Association (ASFA) for the 1885 Season. The old Adelaide colours of Red and Black were adopted.

An internal match of the two clubs was played on Saturday 11 April 1885 at the old North Parks oval. Sides were chosen by Adelaide Club captain J. D. Stephens and vice-captain G. M. Evan, and the ball was started by the president of the club, Mr. L. P. Lawrence.

The new senior Adelaide Team was made up of the North Adelaide Juniors) and North Parks and together with several prominent players from the senior North Adelaide (originally called Victorians) and South Park Clubs which both had disbanded after the end of the 1884 Season.

One of the notable senior experienced players to join the new Adelaide senior club was South Park Captain Aldam Murr "Pet" Pettinger. He became Vice Captain of Adelaide and was the first SAFA player to reach the 100 game milestone. Pettinger represented South Australia in cricket, Australian rules football, baseball and bowls, was a leading local lacrosse player, golfer, steeplechase rider, an excellent gun shot, and bred and trained hunting dogs. On his death in 1950, Pettinger was referred to as "the grand old man of South Australian sport".

=== SAFA 1885 entry of the new senior Adelaide Football Club ===
At the annual meeting of the S.A. Football Association which was held at the Prince Alfred Hotel, on Wednesday evening 15 April 1885, the application to join from the newly merged Adelaide (formerly North Adelaide Juniors) and North Parks was approved.

The new senior team finished last and collected the wooden spoon out of four teams in 1885, but surprised much of the competition to claim the SAFA premiership in 1886 under the captaincy of J. D. Stephens and former South Park Captain A.M. Pettinger as Vice Captain.

== Honour boards ==
Old Adelaide Football Club honour board
Year	Position	Record	Chairman	Secretary	Captain	Leading Goalkicker
1860	Intraclub			Thomas O'Halloran	J.B. Spence; John Acraman; Thomas O'Halloran (Note: Most likely T. J. S. O'Halloran, who was a prominent "old boy" of St Peter's College. His son T. S. O'Halloran, the prominent SAFL executive, was only 5 years old in 1860.); R. Cussen (Note: Most likely T. J. S. O'Halloran, who was a prominent "old boy" of St Peter's College. His son T. S. O'Halloran, the prominent SAFL executive, was only 5 years old in 1860.)	
1861	Intraclub		James MacGeorge	Thomas O'Halloran	Thomas O'Halloran; John Acraman; Cooper	
1862	Intraclub		Thomas O'Halloran	W.W. Anderson	Thomas O'Halloran	
1863	Intraclub		Thomas O'Halloran	Thomas O'Halloran	J. E. Schlinke	
1864	Intraclub		W.W. Anderson	J.E. Schlinke; J. Coulls		
1865	Intraclub		T. McEllister	J. Borrow		
1866	Intraclub					
1867	Intraclub					
1868	Intraclub			C. C. Cornish		
Interclub football
1869	1 (Premiers)	4–0–0	G. O'Halloran	H.Y. (Henry Yorke); Harry Sparks	H.Y. (Henry Yorke); Harry Sparks	
1870	2	1–0–0	W. Pope	W.S. William Sampson	Arthur Malcolm	H.Y. Harry Sparks, Baker, Conigrave (1 each)
1871	1 (Premiers)	3–0–3	President; Governor of South Australia	H.F. Jackson		
1872	1 (Premiers)	4–0–2		A. E. Harrison		
1873	Intraclub		H.Y. Harry Sparks	C. D. Perkins		
1874	Intraclub			S. G. Kingston		
Adelaide Club rules revived
1875	5 (Wooden Spoon)	1–3–1		Harry Conigrave	H.Y. Harry Sparks	
1876	6 (Wooden Spoon)	0–3–2		Harry Conigrave		
Formation of SAFA
1877	3	11–3–3		J.A. Bleechmore	Richard Twopeny	John Young (14)
1878	5	4–4–4				
1879	6	2–5–3				
1880	7 (Wooden Spoon)	1–8–2	W.E. Dalton	F.B. Dalton/E.C.Moore	C.W.Hughes	
Adelaide and Kensington Merger
1881	6 (Wooden Spoon)	0–5–0	T.A. Caterer	E.C.Moore/F.D.Phillips	Wyatt	Oldham (1)
1882	Annual Match with Gawler	Drawn			Wyatt	Clark (1)

== Notes and references ==
Preceded by South Adelaide	SAFA Premiers; 1886	Succeeded by Norwood
