= Mostyn Evan =

Australian lawyer and sports administrator

Griffith Mostyn Evan (22 September 1861 – 25 December 1924), generally referred to as G. M. Evan or Mostyn Evan, was a lawyer and sports administrator in South Australia.

== History ==
Evan was born in Adelaide the fourth son of the Rev. Cadwallader William Evan (d. 22 August 1876), first minister in charge of Stow Memorial Church, and educated at Prince Alfred College. Having decided on a career with the law, Evan was articled to Charles Kingston, K.C., and in 1890 entered into partnership with Hiram W. Varley, as Varley and Evan, with which firm he remained all his life.

In his youth Evan was a keen Australian Rules footballer, and when the North Adelaide Juniors, of which he was the captain, merged with North Park in 1885 to form the Adelaide Football Club in the South Australian Football Association, he was appointed vice captain of the new senior club. He played soccer for South Adelaide and junior cricket with Kensington Cricket Club, and when that team amalgamated with the Austral Club and joined the first grade in 1886, Evan was appointed a delegate to the Cricket Association.

Evan was a member of the first Australian Cricket Council, held in 1892, along with Henry Sparks, Bill Whitridge, and George Giffen. He was also a member of the first Board of Control of Australian Cricket and its successor, so he had the distinction of having sat in every Australian board appointed to control international cricket to his death. Evan succeeded J. W. Collins as treasurer of the association, and was followed in turn by Bernard Scrymgour. For many years Evan acted as chairman of the ground and finance committee of the association, and he also acted as president, then elected to the position in 1920 when Sir Edwin Smith died. He was for many years a trustee of the SACA., and a member of the finance committee until a year before his death. Evan was also closely identified with lacrosse and bowls, and was one of the first presidents of the Adelaide Oval Bowling Club. For 22 years he was president of the Lacrosse Association. He was at one time also president of the League of South Australian Wheelmen, the leading sports cycling association. He was also involved in athletics; for 27 years he acted as judge at the inter-collegiate sports meetings. Away from sports, he was for two years a member of the Adelaide City Council.

== Family ==
Among Evan's four or five brothers and two sisters were Cadwallader Burton Evan, of Millswood, and Mrs. A. W. Pettit, of Kent Town.

Evan married Lilie Nellnell Bagot (2 July 1867 – 23 May 1956), third daughter of Edward Meade Bagot (1822–1886) on 7 October 1891. They had a daughter, Mrs. L. Gliddon
