= 1871 South Australian football season =

1871 South Australian football premiership season
- Teams: 5
- Premiers: Adelaide (unofficial); 2nd premiership

The 1871 South Australian football season was the third year of interclub football in the colony of South Australia. Prior to the establishment of the South Australian Football Association (SAFA) in April 1877, the football season was largely a series of independent club matches and challenge games rather than an organized league season. The unaffiliated era was from 1869 to 1876.

== Major Metropolitan Clubs ==
- Adelaide
- Alberton and Queenstown
- Kensington
- Port Adelaide
- Young Australian

=== Colleges ===
- North Adelaide Grammar School, later Whinham College
- Prince Alfred College, Kent Town

=== Country Clubs ===
- Gawler
- Kapunda

== Adelaide Football Club ==
The opening game of football was played in the afternoon of Saturday 15 April 1871, on the North Park Lands, between the Adelaide and Port Adelaide Clubs, the Concordia Band having been engaged. The following were the twenty Adelaide players selected: — Messrs. Aldridge, Brock, Conigrave, Colley, Chambers, Calf, Dale, Dalton, Higgins, Harrison, Jackson, Milne, Masters, Monteith, Nesbit, Randall, Sharpe, Sparks, Townsend, and Watson.

On 27 May 1871 it was reported His Excellency the Governor consented to take the office of President of this Club, and Lieutenant Fergusson (Private Secretary) purposed joining as a member.

== Alberton and Queenstown Football Club ==
The Alberton and Queenstown Football Club was formed at the annual meeting held on 24 April 1871 of the Alberton and Queenstown Cricket Club. The following officers were chosen for the year: President — Mr. B. C. DeLissa; Captain — Mr. Thomas Sinclair ; Treasurer — Mr. C. Formby ; Secretary — Mr. Thomas Sinclair ; Committee—Messrs. J.Counsell, B. Grandfield, and W. Dowsett. The Club numbered 30 members and was financially in a good position. The club played its opening game on 28 April 1871 at the ground adjoining the Port Gasworks at Kingston-on-the-Hill.

Players - Blais, Counsell, R. Darling, J. Darling, Dempster, Dowsell, A. Formby, C. Formby, Grandfield, Le Messurier, Martin, Parker, Riscely, A. Saunders, W. Saunders, T. Sinclair, J.H. Sinclair, Stone, Wade, Williams.

== Port Adelaide Football Club ==
Closing game was played at Glanville on Saturday 9 September 1871.

== Young Australian renames to Union Cricket and Football Club ==
A general meeting of the Young Australian Football Club was held at the Committee Room, Prince Alfred Hotel, on Wednesday, August 16, 1871, with Mr. F. C. Aldridge presiding. It was resolved that as the football season was closing, and there being a Cricket Club called the Young Australians, the name be changed to the Union Cricket and Football Club. The following officers were elected:— F. C. Aldridge, Captain; W. E. Dalton, Hon. Sec.; S. H. Goode, W. A. Hughes, W. G. Nash, B.Moulden, and W. H. Young, Committee for the half-year ending February 29, 1872.

== Metropolitan football matches ==
=== April 15 ===
	Opening Game
Saturday, 15 April (3:00 pm)	Adelaide 1	def.	Port Adelaide 0	Adelaide Ground (North Park Lands) (crowd: 500)
Captains - G.Dale and F.Stone. Each side mustered 21 players. Port won the toss and kicked with the wind from the west. Goal Scorer - Higgins (Adelaide) at 5pm. Ends then changed. Game concluded at 5.30pm

=== April 29 ===
	Rematch - Port Adelaide v Adelaide
Saturday, 29 April	Port Adelaide 0	drew with	Adelaide 0	Glanville
Captains - F.Stone and J.Masters. The sides numbered 17 and 18 players respectively. Port Adelaide won the toss and kicked with the wind blowing gently from the south. Adelaide struck the post and also the cross-bar and on several occasions nearly sent the ball through the goal but failed to score a goal. The game was attended by numerous spectators and concluded after 3 hours of very spirited play.

=== May 13 ===
Prince Alfred 0 defeated by Young Australian Clubs 1 - Prince Alfred College grounds

=== May 20 ===
	Conquering Game - Adelaide v Port Adelaide
Saturday, 20 May	Adelaide 1	def.	Port Adelaide 0	Adelaide Ground (North Park Lands)
Captains - J.Masters and F.Stone. Port won the toss and elected to kick from the west. Goal Scorer - Harrold Sparks (Adelaide)

	College Game - Whinham v Prince Alfred College
Saturday, 20 May	Whinham College 0	def.	Prince Alfred College 2	Montefiore Hill, North Adelaide
Goalkickers - Milner and Jolly.

=== May 27 ===
Saturday, 27 May (3:00 pm)	Young Australian 0	drew with	Prince Alfred College 0	Prince Alfred College
Captains W. Young and A.Colton

Saturday, 27 May (3:00 pm)	Alberton and Queenstown 0	def. by	Port Adelaide 1	Kingston
Game played at Kingston - Alberton & Queenstown's Home Ground. Captains C.Formby and F.Stone. Ball kicked off by the Albertons. Port kicked two goals but one grazed the inside of the bar. Play on both sides was described as particularly rough with Port keeping the ball in their opponents quarter all afternoon.

	Adelaide Club Grand Match Old Collegians (Blue) and Non-Collegians (Pink)
Saturday, 27 May (2:45 pm)	Old Collegians 1	def. by	Non Collegians 3	Adelaide's Ground
Captains Collegians A.R. Malcolm/W.Taylor and Non-Collegians H.Y.Sparks. 16 players on each side. Goal scorers - Non Collegians H.Conigrave (3), Collegians T.Sharpe. There was a very large gathering of spectators and the goals very prettily decorated with bunning. Teams: Collegians — Aldridge, Ayers, Crooks, Chambers, Colley, Horn, Malcolm, Milne, Monteith, Morphett, O'Halloran, Randall, Sharpe, Taylor, Trimmer, Warburton. Non-Collegians— Aldridge, Brock, Conigrave, Dalton, Ferguson, Giles, Harrison, Higgins, Jackson, Kingston, Kingston, Masters, Mellor, H. Y. Sparks, C. Perkins, Winsor.

=== July 22 ===
Saturday, 22 July	Adelaide 3	def.	Alberton and Queenstown 0	Adelaide Ground (North Park Lands)
Captains - J.Masters and J.Counsell. Each side numbered 16 players. Colours - Adelaide Blue, Alberton and Queenstown Pink. Goal Scorers - Harold Sparks, Higgins, Sharpe (Adelaide)

=== July 29 ===
Prince Alfred College and Young Australian drew 0–0

=== August 7 ===
	Public Holiday - Kapunda v Adelaide
Monday, August 7 (11:00)	Kapunda 1	drew with	Adelaide 1	Kapunda
Captains - Rowe and J.Masters. The sides numbered 18 players each. Kapunda won the toss and kicked with the wind. After 3 hours of a very spirited contest H. Blackwell of Kapunda scored a goal and a short interval was taken. Ends were changed and after 3/4 of an hour W.Higgins secured a goal for Adelaide. Due to insufficient time to continue the game was concluded with friendly cheers exchanged by the respective teams.

=== August 19 ===
	Challenge Match - Kensington v Adelaide
Saturday, August 19	Kensington 0	def. by	Adelaide 1	Kensington
Ground - short distance eastward of the Marryatville Hotel. Adelaide 16 players - Kensington 20 players. Advertised teams : Adelaide — Aldridge, Burgan, Conigrave, Carruthers, Fenn, Horn, Jackson, Masters, Nesbit, Perkins, Reade, Sparks, Saunders, Spicer, Wvly, Watson; Kensington — Bonney (3}, Frew, Gliddon, Hallack, Hall (2), Jay, Meredith, Moulden, Mullen, Perry (2), Phillips, Roberts, Reed, Stanton, Wilson, Waterbouse

=== September 2 ===
	Return Match - Adelaide v Kensington
Saturday, September 2	Adelaide 1	drew with	1 Kensington 1	Adelaide Ground (North Park Lands)
Captains - E.H. Aldridge and E.N. Hallack. Colours - Adelaide (Blue) and Kensington (Pink). Each side 16 players. There was a large and fashionable concourse of spectators. Kensington Pinks won choice of goals and kicked from the west. Perry scored the first goal for the pinks after 1.5 hours. Ends were changed and after half an hour Higgins scored for the blues. Play continued to dusk with neither side scoring a second goal.

== Other football matches ==
=== August 26 ===
	Scratch Match Adelaide - Port Adelaide (forfeited)
Saturday, August 26 (3pm)	Adelaide (Pink) 2	def.	0 Adelaide (Blue)	Adelaide Grounds (North Park Lands)
Port Adelaide captain unable to field a team. A scratch match was played by Adelaide which included several Port members. Acting captains J. Masters (pink), and E. W. Aldridge (blue)

== Unofficial Ladder ==
Pos	Team	Pld	W	L	D	GF	GA	
1	Adelaide	7	4	0	3	8	2	Unofficial Premiers (undefeated)
2	Kensington	2	0	1	1	1	2	Drew against Adelaide scoring one goal
3	Port Adelaide	4	1	2	1	1	2	Defeated Alberton and Queenstown
4	Kapunda	1	0	0	1	1	1	Drew against Adelaide scoring one goal
5	Alberton and Queenstown	2	0	2	0	0	4	Lost to Adelaide and Port Adelaide

Source: Match Reports
