= 1870 South Australian football season =

1870 South Australian football premiership season
- Teams: 4
- Premiers: Young Australian (unofficial); 1st premiership

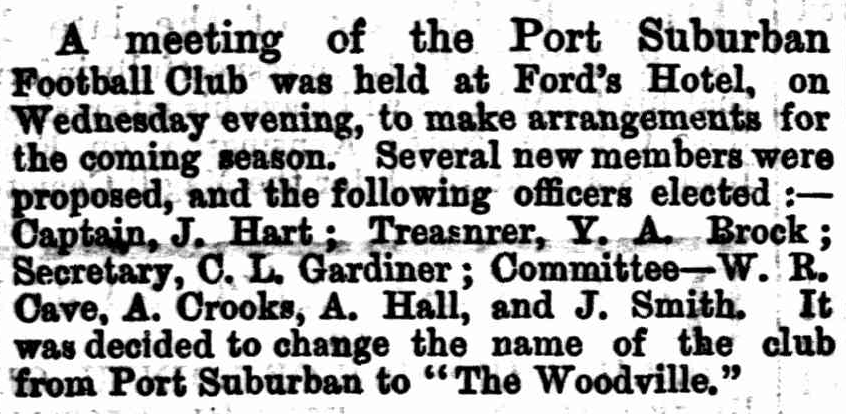
Port Suburban renames to Woodville on 11 May 1870.

13 May 1870 excerpt from the South Australian Register proclaiming the founding of the 'Port Adelaide Cricket and Football Club'.

The 1870 South Australian football season was the second year of interclub football in the colony of South Australia. Prior to the establishment of the South Australian Football Association (SAFA) in April 1877, the football season was largely a series of independent club matches and challenge games rather than an organized league season. The unaffiliated era was from 1869 to 1876.

== Major Metropolitan Clubs ==
- Adelaide
- Port Adelaide
- Woodville
- Young Australian

=== Colleges ===
- Adelaide Educational Institution
- North Adelaide Grammar School, later Whinham College

=== Country Clubs ===
- Gawler
- Kapunda

== Adelaide Football Club ==
Adelaide Football Club now commonly called the Old Adelaide Football Club, and which has no connection with the current Adelaide Football Club competing in the Australian Football League, was the inaugural football club established in Adelaide in 1860 following an advertisement in the South Australian Register notifying the Adelaide public about an upcoming meeting the following evening at 7pm to form a football club. The advertisement, sponsored by John Acraman, W.J. Fullarton and R. Cussen noted that group had already gathered 30 members.

On Thursday 26 April 1860 the Adelaide Football Club was formed at the Globe Inn Hotel, Rundle Street with John Brodie Spence chairing the meeting. It was thereby the first football club established in South Australia.

== Port Adelaide Football Club Formation ==
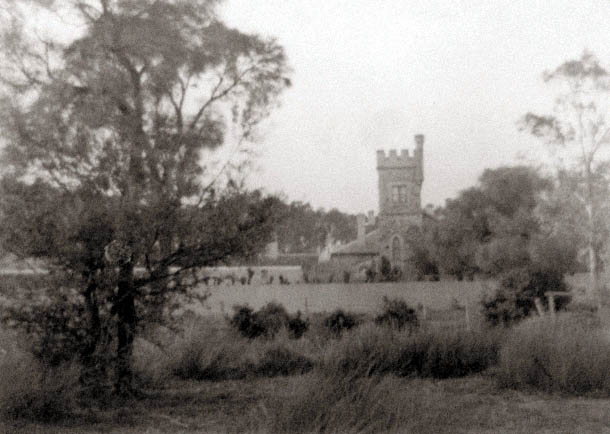
Buck's Flat, Glanville Hall Estate (c. 1870). The grounds which Port Adelaide played at from 1870 until 1881.

Port Adelaide Football Club was formed on 12 May 1870 as a joint football and cricket club. The first training session of the newly formed club took place two days later. The Port Adelaide Football Club played its first match against a newly established club from North Adelaide called the Young Australian. The Club played home games at Buck's Flat on Captain Hart's Glanville Estate until the end of the 1879 season. The inaugural Club Captain was John Wald and the team colours wore blue and white until 1877.

== Port Suburban renamed Woodville ==
The Port Suburban Football Club changed its name to "The Woodvilles" at a meeting held at the Ford's Hotel on Wednesday 11 May 1870. J. Hart was elected Captained. Several new members were proposed, and the following officers elected :— Captain, J. Hart; Treasurer, Y. A. Brock; Secretary, C. L. Gardiner; Committee — W. R.Cave, A. Crooks, A. Hall, and J. Smith.

The Football Club played home games at the reserve (now located in St Clair) adjacent to the Woodville Railway Station. The reserve was also used by the Port Adelaide Athletics Sports Club.

== Young Australian Football Club Formation ==
The Young Australian Football Club was established on the 11 May 1870, in North Adelaide at the Royal Oak Hotel. It was reported that a dozen persons were present and Mr. W. L. Wyly was appointed Secretary and Treasurer, and Messrs. Mellor, Harrison, Holthouse, Simms, and Randall the committee. Blue and white were decided upon as the colors. It was decided to challenge the Port Suburban Club for the opening game.

== Metropolitan football matches ==
=== May 28 ===
	Woodville v Young Australian
Saturday, 28 May (3.00pm)	Woodville 1	def. by	Young Australian 3	Woodville
Captains - Woodville John Hart Jr. (Pink), Young Australians Mr. J. C. Smith (Blue). The sides numbered 18 players each. Young Australians Goal Scorers - J.C. Smith , Murray and Conigrave. This was the first game played by the Young Australian Football Club. The game concluded shortly after 5pm when Woodville scored. The visiting team then made a hasty departure to catch the train to Adelaide which had just arrived at the Station. There was a large number of spectators present. Advertised Teams : Woodville — Brock, Formby, Formby, Dale, Slater, Hall, Stephens, Fergusson, Hart, O'Halloran, Barber, Beck, Walters, Gardiner, Smith, Sinclair, Howell, Marian. Young Australian — Murray, Holthouse, Higgins, W. C. Townsend, Harrison, Jackson, Wigley, Sanders, Milne, Sharpe, Reade, Randall, Conigrave, R. Aldridge, W. Phillips, S. Sparks, H. Morgan, J. C. Smith, P. Burden.

=== Jun 11 ===
	Woodville v Adelaide
Saturday, 11 June	Woodville 0	def. by	Adelaide 3	Woodville
Captains - Woodville : Cave (Pink), Adelaide : Malcolm (Blue). The sides numbered 14 players each. Adelaide Goal Scorers - Sparks, Baker and Conigrave. The game concluded at 5pm. There was a fair number of spectators present.

=== Jul 23 ===
	Young Australian v Woodville
Saturday, 23 Jul (3.30pm)	Young Australian 0	drew with	Woodville 0	South Australian Cricket Ground
Captains - Young Australian: J.C. Smith, Woodville : A. Crooks. The sides numbered 10 players each. Start of play delayed due to rain and the ground was very slippery. The game concluded after 1.5 hours. Note - Adelaide Oval was not established until December 1873 by the SACA.

=== Jul 30 ===
	Young Australian v Port Adelaide
Saturday, 30 Jul	Young Australian 1	drew with	Port Adelaide 1	North Park Lands, North Adelaide
Captains - The Young Australians Mr. J. C. Smith, and Port Adelaide by Mr. J. Wald. The sides numbered 16 players respectively after the Young Australians took on some substitutes. Port Adelaide kicked the first goal - scored by Wald. W. Higgins scored for Young Australians. The game concluded at 5.30pm. This was the first game played by the Port Adelaide Football Club

=== Aug 20: Port Adelaide v Young Australian ===
	Port Adelaide v Young Australian (Rematch)
Saturday, 20 Aug (3:00 pm)	Port Adelaide 1	drew with	Young Australian 1	Glanville Estate
Captains - The Young Australians Mr. H. Y. Sparks and Port Adelaide by Mr. J. Wald. The sides numbered 15 players each. The Young Australians won the toss and kicked with the strong wind and scored the first goal kicked by Conigrave. With ends changed Port Adelaide kicked their first goal - scored by their captain J. Wald. The game concluded at sundown with no further score. There was a large attendance of spectators.

=== Aug 20: Gawler v Woodville ===
	Gawler v Woodville
Saturday, 20 Aug	Gawler 0	def. by	Woodville 1	Salisbury
It was reported that a football match was played at Salisbury on a vacant piece of land opposite the Mill between 12 members of the Gawler Club and Woodville (who had a few Salisbury gents help made up their numbers). Gawler Captain was Mr. R.C. Sandland and Woodville's Mr. A. Crooks who scored the only goal after 1 hour of play.

=== Sep 10 ===
	Young Australian v Port Adelaide Closing game of the Season
Saturday, 10 Sep	Young Australian 2	def.	Port Adelaide 0	North Park Lands
Captains - The Young Australians Mr. H. Y. Sparks and Port Adelaide by Mr. John Wald. The sides numbered 15 players each. The Young Australians goal scorers Sparks and E. Aldridge. There was a fair attendance of spectators.

== Unofficial Ladder ==
Pos	Team	Pld	W	L	D	GF	GA	
1	Young Australian	5	2	0	3	7	3	Unofficial Premiers (undefeated)
2	Adelaide	1	1	0	0	3	0	Defeated Woodville
3	Port Adelaide	3	0	1	2	2	4	All games against Young Australians
4	Woodville	3	0	2	1	1	6	Lost to Adelaide and Young Australians

Source: Match Reports - Woodville vs Gawler excluded (Teams consisted of just 12 players and the Woodville Team was supplemented with a number of Salisbury men)
