= 1873 South Australian football season =

1873 South Australian football premiership season
- Teams: 2
- Premiers: Kensington; 1st premiership
- Matches played: 3

The 1873 South Australian football season was the fifth year of interclub football in South Australia. Prior to the establishment of the South Australian Football Association (SAFA) in April 1877, the football season was largely a series of independent club matches and challenge games rather than an organized league season. The unaffiliated era was from 1869 to 1876.

== Background ==
Prior to 1877, football in South Australia was yet to be formally organised by a single body and as a result there were two main sets of rules in use across the state. Due to this Kensington called for a meeting with the other two clubs Adelaide and Port Adelaide in an attempt to create a standardised set of rules at a meeting held on 10 May 1873 in which each club sent three delegates. Following a break down when practice matches were advertised, Adelaide then went in recess for interclub games until 1875, meaning Kensington and Port Adelaide were the only senior teams competing in 1873.

== Opening Intraclub games (3 May 1873) ==
The football season opened on Saturday 3rd May 1873. Reports of the opening practices in connection with the Adelaide, Kensington, and Port Adelaide were given.

- Adelaide at Adelaide Club Grounds: Reds (Captain C.D. Perkins) defeated Blues 1- 0.
- Kensington at Kensington: Blues (Captain H.R.Perry) defeated Reds (Captain A. Crooks) 1-0.
- Port Adelaide at Glanville Hall Estate: Blues (Captain George Ireland) defeated Pinks (Captain F.Stone) 1-0.

The Port Adelaide Band played during the afternoon. The members were mourning, the late President, Captain John. Hart, C.M.G.

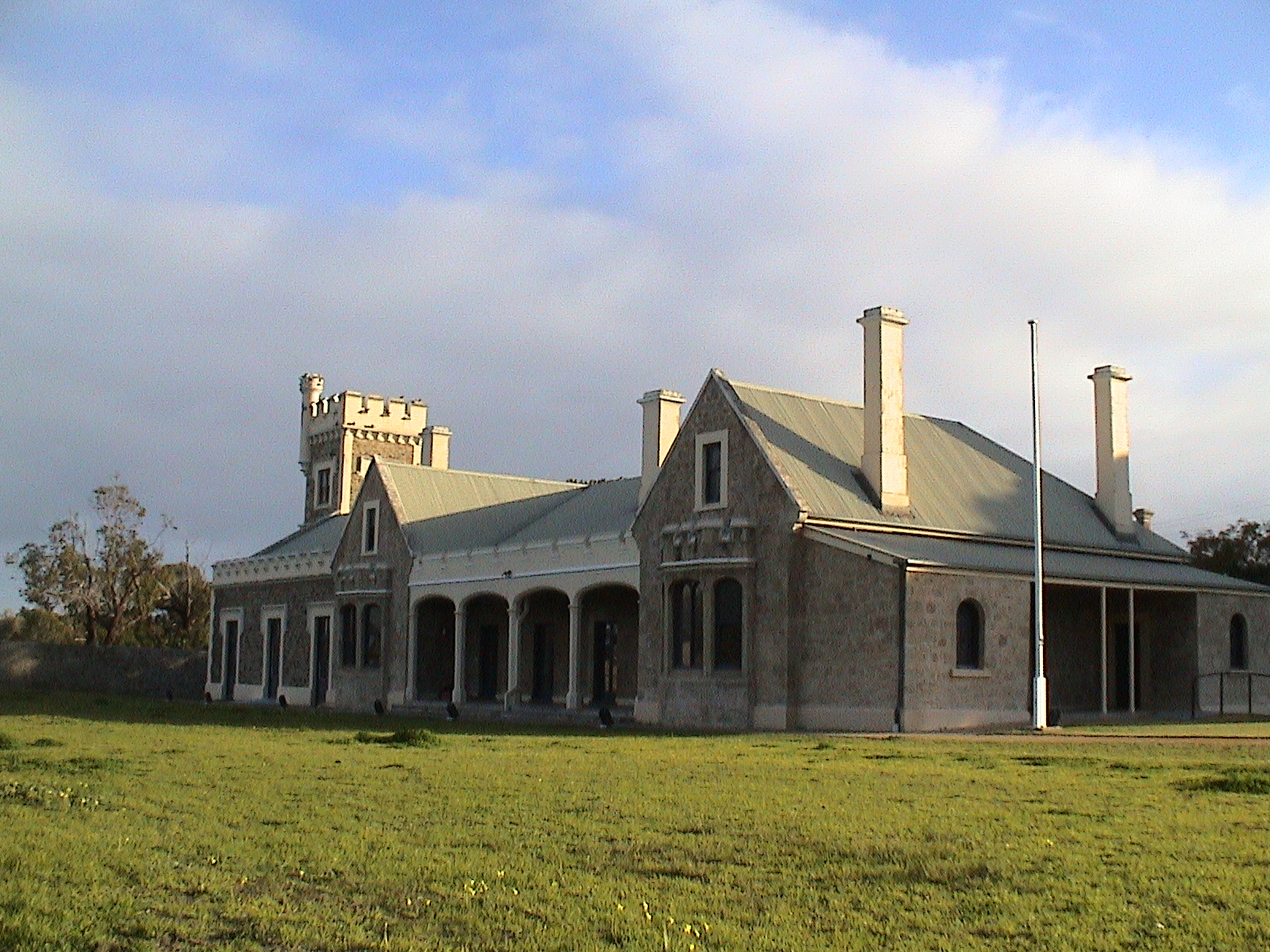
Glanville Hall, the family home built in 1856 by Captain Hart at Semaphore South34°50′55.0″S 138°28′53.8″E

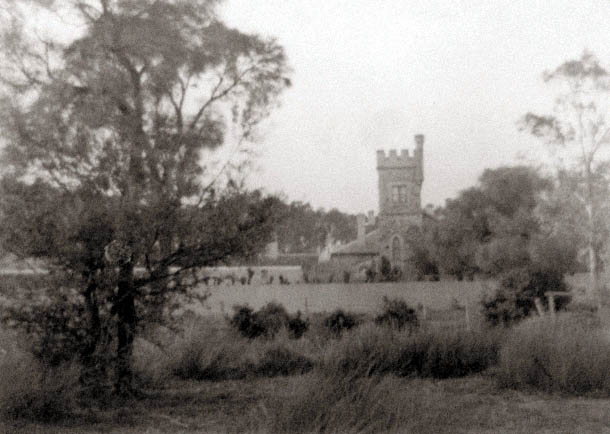
Glanville Hall Estate c1850

== Meeting of Delegates 10 May 1873 ==
At the meeting of Delegates held at the Prince Alfred Hotel there were present Messrs. C. C. Kingston, Winsor, and Perkins, from the Adelaide Club; Messrs. Crooks, H. R. Perry, and B. Moulden, from the Kensington Club; and Messrs W. Townsend, G. Ireland, and Rann, from the Port Adelaide Club.
Mr. Kingston, who was voted to the chair, having explained the object of the meeting, the business was gone into, and after the various rules were discussed seriatim, a code was drawn up somewhat similar to the rules of the English Football Association.

== Breakdown of new Rules (17 May 1873) ==
Following a meeting held on 10 May 1873 in which the three clubs agreed upon a set of rules practice matches were advertised on Friday 16 May 1873. The Kensington Club advertised their own practice match, stating the new rules were not ready, which led to an immediate breakdown of the rules agreed by all three clubs.

Advertisements placed on Friday 16 May 1873.

KENSINGTON FOOTBALL CLUB - New Rules not being ready, PRACTICE AS USUAL on Kensington Ground, H. R. PERRY, Hon. Sec.

FOOTBALL. — A SCRATCH MATCH between the Adelaide, Kensington, and Port Football Clubs will be held on the North Park Lands, on Saturday Afternoon, May 17, commencing at half-past 2. All Members of each Club requested to attend. Band engaged, C. D. PERKINS, Hon. Sec. A. F. C.

Advertisements were again placed on Saturday 17 May 1873.

FOOTBALL.-A SCRATCH MATCH, between the Adelaide, Kensington, and Port Football Clubs will be held on the North Park Lands, on Saturday afternoon, May 17, commencing at half-past 2. All Members of each Club requested to attend. Band engaged. C. D. PERKINS, Hon. Sec. A. F. C.

KENSINGTON FOOTBALL CLUB — In consequence of the Adelaides having altered the Rules made at the meeting of Delegates, KENSINGTONS will NOT PLAY in SCRATCH MATCH, but on their OWN GROUND, H. R. PERRY, Hon. Sec. K.F.C.

== Metropolitan Interclub football matches ==
- 5 July at Kensington: Kensington 1 def Port Adelaide 0
- 19 July at Kensington: Kensington 3 def Port Adelaide 0
- 23 August at Glanville Hall: Port Adelaide 1 def Kensington 0

== Ladder ==
Pos	Team	Pld	W	L	D	GF	GA	Pts	
1	Kensington	3	2	1	0	4	1	8	Premiers
2	Port Adelaide	3	1	2	0	1	4	4	2nd

== Other Matches ==
17 May 1873 -A match, played on Saturday afternoon upon the grounds of the Adelaide Educational Institution, at Parkside, between the Football Club of that establishment and that of the North Adelaide Grammar School, resulted in a drawn game, owing to neither side getting a goal. C. Aldridge and E. Wigg captained the respective sides, and the play, which began at 3 o'clock, was carried on with vigour throughout the afternoon. The Grammar School boys deserved praise for fighting placidly against opponents who on the whole were much bigger than themselves.

19 May 1873 - North Adelaide Grammar School VS Alberton and Queenstown
A football match was played on Saturday afternoon below Montefiore Hill between the above Clubs, and resulted in a victory for the former by one goal.
