= 1872 South Australian football season =

1872 South Australian football premiership season
- Teams: 3
- Premiers: Adelaide; 2nd premiership
- Matches played: 6
- Highest: 400 (June 15, Kensington v. Adelaide)

The 1872 South Australian football season was the fourth year of interclub football in South Australia. Prior to the establishment of the South Australian Football Association (SAFA) in April 1877, the football season was largely a series of independent club matches and challenge games rather than an organized league season. The unaffiliated era was from 1869 to 1876.

== Major Metropolitan Clubs ==
- Adelaide Football club
- Kensington
- Port Adelaide

== Opening Matches ==
Port Adelaide - Friday 12th April 1872

== Metropolitan inter-club matches ==
- June 15 – Kensington (0) drew with Adelaide (0) Played at Kensington (Crowd: 400)
  The ground, which has been lent to the Kensington players by the Hon. H. Mildred, M.L.C., has been considerably improved, permanent goals having been erected and the land made more fit. Mr. S. G. Kingston acting- as captain for Adelaides, and Mr. A. Crooks for the Suburbans.
- June 29 - Adelaide (4) def Port Adelaide (0)
- July 13 – Adelaide (1) def Kensington (0)
- July 27 - Adelaide (0) drew with Port Adelaide (0)
- August 6 - Adelaide (1) def Kensington (0)
- September 7 – Adelaide (1) def Port Adelaide (0) - Adelaide Grounds, North Park Lands. Colours Adelaide Blue - Port Pink

== Adelaide vs Old Collegian Annual Match ==
- August 17 - Adelaide (Pink) ) 0 goals drew Old Collegian (Blue) 0 goals, North Park Lands. Crowd 2000.

Captains - Adelaide Mr. G. S. Kingston, Old Collegians Benjamin Taylor

Adelaide colour pink, and the players are to be Aldridge (2), Brock, Burgan, Conigrave, Ellery, J. A. Fergusson, Higgins, Harrison, Holthouse, Hushes, Kingston (2), Perkins, Spicer, Sparks, Wyly.
Collegians, blue. Players — Aldridge, F. Ayers, Baker, Crooks, Dale, Haigh, Horn, Jay, Malcolm, Millard, Milne, Sanders, Rowe, Trimmer, Turner, Taylor (2).

- August 31 - Match resumed - Adelaide 1 goal drew Old Collegian 1 goal

== Club Closing Matches ==
The closing game of the Kensington Football Club was played on September 14,1872 on the grounds of the Club, which are prettily situated a short distance beyond Kensington.
The teams reds and blues were respectively captained by Messrs. Frank Perry and J. Reid. The only goal was scored by Crooks for the red team.

== Ladder ==
Pos	Team	Pld	W	L	D	GF	GA	
1	Adelaide	6	4	0	2	7	0	Premiers
2	Kensington	3	0	2	1	0	2	Equal 2nd
2	Port Adelaide	3	0	2	1	0	5	Equal 2nd
