= Arthur Terrell =

Australian stockbroker (1861–1931)

Arthur Bishop Terrell (1861 – 9 June 1931) was an Australian businessman in Melbourne, Victoria and also was an Australian rules footballer who played for Woodville and Norwood in the South Australian Football Association (SAFA) during the 19th century.

Terrell was born in the Talunga region of South Australia, a son of John Beaton Terrell (c. 1829 – 12 January 1873) and his wife Mary Terrell, née Cave (c. 1831 – 20 October 1894). Mary was a sister of W. R. Cave.

He was educated at North Adelaide Grammar School and as a young man excelled at football, and became a Life member of the Norwood club in 1885.

He became a member of the Adelaide Stock Exchange on 14 September 1899, but lived in Melbourne from around 1905.

He was in 1905 one of the founders of the Zinc Corporation.

== Family ==
Terrell married Elizabeth Hall Herring ( – 28 November 1947). They had three surviving children, all of whom left for London aboard SS Osterley with their mother in 1912.

- Arthur Clive Terrell (28 September 1898 – 20 April 1917) was lieutenant in the British Army; died of wounds at Étaples during WWI
- Edna Winifred Terrell (May 1904 – ) married Pilot Officer Sir Christopher Albert De Bathe, Bart. (c. 1906 – 6 June 1941) on 12 January 1932. He was killed on active service. He was a nephew of Lily Langtry and her husband Hugo Gerald de Bathe (1871–1940), and grandson of Sir Henry de Bathe, 4th Baronet.
- John Alwyn Terrell (1907 – )

He had a home at 3 Stanhope Grove, Camberwell, Victoria.
