= 1869 South Australian football season =

1869 South Australian football premiership season
- Teams: 3
- Premiers: Adelaide (unofficial); 1st premiership

The 1869 South Australian football season was the first year of interclub football in the colony of South Australia. In Adelaide, prior to the establishment of the South Australian Football Association (SAFA) in April 1877, the football season was largely a series of independent club matches and challenge games rather than an organized league season. The unaffiliated era was from 1869 to 1876. The Old Adelaide Football Club, formed in 1860, was the leading club in Adelaide during the 1860s.

== Major Adelaide and Metropolitan Clubs ==
- Adelaide
- Port Suburban (Woodville) (formed 1868)

== Other Adelaide Clubs ==
- North Adelaide
- St Peter's Collegiate

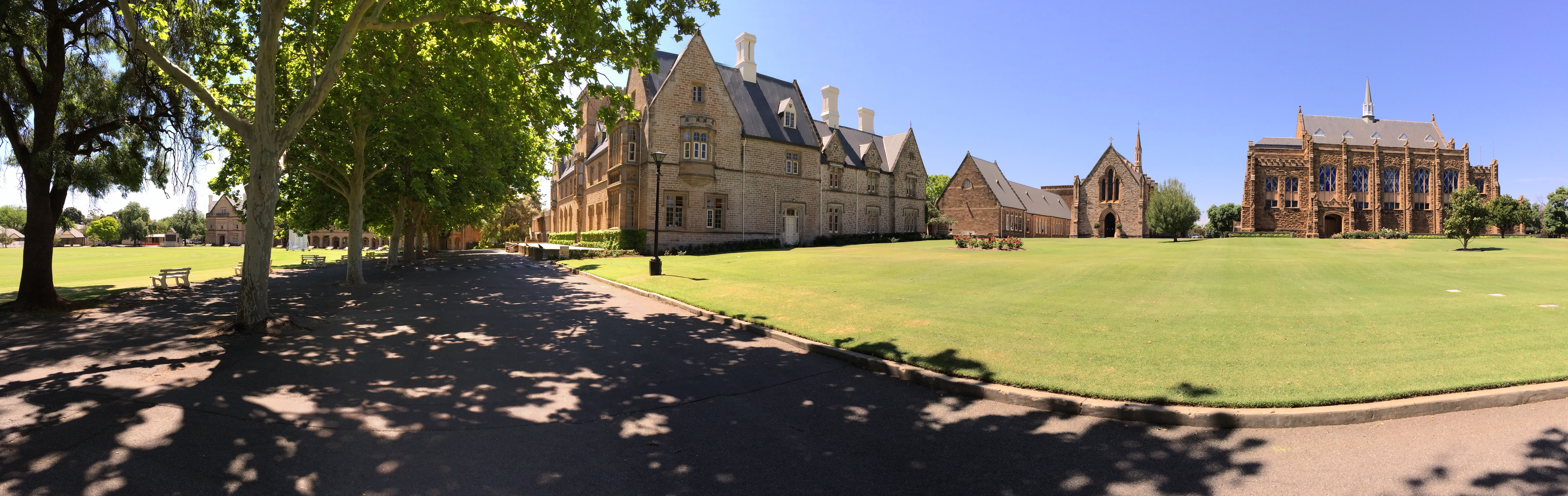
Panorama of St Peter's College buildings, including Old School House, the Chapel and Memorial Hall

=== Country Clubs ===
- Gawler
- Kapunda (formed 5 August 1869)
- Mount Gambier
- Penola Football Club (formed 1865)

== Early History and Rules ==
Australian rules football began in Melbourne in 1858, however from 1860 to 1872 the Adelaide club played what appears to be a game a cross between association football and rugby using a round ball. Adelaide played intraclub and interclub football in South Australia until 1873, when it had disputes with Kensington Football Club and Port Adelaide Football Club over standardizing the rules.

At a meeting of the Adelaide Football Club held at Lloyd's Coffee Booms on Wednesday 7th April 1869, with about a dozen members present, the rules were considered and amended in several instances, the most material alteration being that in future the ball should be kicked over instead of under the crossbar of the goal.

== Metropolitan football matches ==
=== April 17 ===
| | Adelaide Football Club Opening Game |
| Saturday, 17 April (2:30 pm) | Adelaide (North) 1 | drew with | Adelaide (South) 1 | Adelaide Ground (North Park Lands) |
Colours - North - Pink. South - Blue. Captains - H.Y.Sparks (Pink) and A.R.Malcolm (Blue). Goal Scorers - Murray (North) with a well measured kick and Taylor (South) with a long kick. Large group of spectators, including many ladies, were present.

=== May 1 ===
| | Port Suburban Football Club Opening Game |
| Saturday, 1 May (2:30 pm) | Port 3 | drew with | Suburban 3 | Woodville |
Play concluded at 5.30pm. The full band of the Port Adelaide Artillery enlivened proceedings during the afternoon.

=== May 15 ===
| | North Adelaide v Collegians |
| Saturday, 15 May (2:59 pm) | North Adelaide 3 | def. | Collegians 2 | North Park Lands |
There were 18 players aside, and Messrs. Murray and Simms acted respectively as captains. North Adelaide scored the first two goals, followed by College scoring two. After an interval North Adelaide scored another goal. There was a very large crowd.

=== May 22 ===
| | Intercollege Match |
| Saturday, 22 May | St Peter's College 2 | def. | Adelaide Educational Institution 0 | North Park Lands |
Each team - 16 players, R. Gwynne and F. Aldridge acted respectively as captains. There was a large attendance of spectators. Adelaide Educational Institution founded in 1852 moved to Young Street, Parkside in 1872. It was founded by John Lorenzo Young.

=== May 29 ===
| | Gawler v Adelaide |
| Saturday, 29 May (2:30 pm) | Gawler 0 | def. by | Adelaide 3 | Gawler Park Lands |
Captains Messrs. Sparks (Adelaide) and Sandland (Gawler). Teams - 15 members aside. Large number spectators were present and the brass band.

=== June 26 ===
| | Port Suburban v Adelaide (1st game of season) |
| Saturday, 26 June (3:00 pm) | Port Suburban 0 | def. by | Adelaide 1 | Woodville |
Captains Messrs. W.S. Samson (Adelaide) and J.Hart (Port Suburban). Teams - 16 members aside. Adelaide Goal Scorer - E.Aldridge. Game duration - 2 hours.

=== July 17 ===
| | Adelaide Football Club Colours Game |
| Saturday, 17 July | Adelaide (North) 0 | drew with | Adelaide (South) 0 | Adelaide Ground (North Park Lands) |
Colours - North - Pink (18 Players). South - Blue (17 Players). Captains - W.S.Samson and Malcolm. Shortly before sundown the football burst and put an end to the play. It was report that the Match commenced at the beginning of the season, has resulted in two ties and a victory in one instance for the North. The Match is still to be taken up on some future Saturday.

=== July 24 ===
| | Adelaide v Military (14th Regiment) |
| Saturday, 24 July (3:00 pm) | Adelaide 4 | def. | Military (14th Regiment) 0 | North Park Lands (crowd: 200) |
Captains Messrs. Malcolm (Adelaide) and Olphert (Military). Adelaide Goal Scorers - Sparks (2), W. Samson (1), Crooks (1). Each Team 15 players. Adelaide Team - Messrs. Aldridge, Cave, Crooks, Hart, S. Kingston, C. Kingston, Malcom, Murray, Sanders, E. Samson, W. Samson, Sparks, Taylor, Walters and Warburton. Military Team - Messrs. Olphert, Jobson, Cullen, Finnion, Keegan, Boyle, Brown, Clark, Whelan, Williams, Maher, Brown, Donnelly, Aldridge and Cleary.

=== July 31 ===
| | Adelaide v Woodville (Port Suburban) |
| Saturday, 31 July (3:00 pm) | Adelaide 3 | def. | Woodville (Port Suburban} 1 | North Adelaide Grounds |
Captains Messrs. H.Y. Sparks (Adelaide) and A.Crooks (Woodville). Teams - 15 members aside. Adelaide Goal Scorers - Sparks, Conigrave, Aldridge. Woodville - A. Crooks. Woodville scored first. Adelaide players: E. Aldridge, C. Boucaut, Burgan, H. Conigrave, Dale, S. G. Kingston, Malcolm, Mellor, G. O'Halloran, Sanders, W. S. Samson, E. Samson, Sparks, Spiller, and Warburton. Woodville players: Brick, Caves, Crooks, Formby, Formby, Hall, Hart, Heather, Gardiner, Johnson, O'Halloran, Packard, Stephens, Walters, and Ward.

=== August 6 ===
| | North Adelaide v St Peter's Collegians |
| Friday, 6 August (2.00pm) | North Adelaide 4 | def. | St Peter's Collegians 0 | North Park Lands |
Captains - North Adelaide R. Murray and St Peter's Collegians A. Simms. 18 players per team. Goal scorers North Adelaide - H. Conigrave (2) and one each by Sanders and Randall.

=== August 28 ===
| | North Adelaide v St Peter's Collegians (Return Match) |
| Saturday, 28 August (2.59pm) | North Adelaide 0 | def. by | St Peter's Collegians 1 | North Park Lands |
Captains - North Adelaide (Pink) R. Murray and St Peter's Collegians (Blue) A. Simms. After two hours played the Collegians scored the only goal. There was a good attendance present.

| | Gawler v Kapunda |
| Saturday, 28 August | Gawler 1 | def. by | Kapunda 2 | Gawler |
Captains Messrs Sandland (Gawler) - Colours Pink and Nicholls (Kapunda) - Colours Blue. Teams - 15 members aside. Kapunda Goal Scorers - P.J. Brady, Kenny. Gawler - W. Woods. Kapunda scored first, followed by Gawler then Kapunda scored the winning goal.

=== September 11 ===
| | North Adelaide v St Peter's Collegians (Conquering Match) |
| Saturday, 11 September | North Adelaide 2 | drew with | St Peter's Collegians 2 | North Park Lands |
Captains - North Adelaide R. Murray and St Peter's Collegians A. Simms. Twenty players per side and the match lasted until sundown. Goal scorers: North Adelaide - Holthouse and Jackson. St Peter's Collegians - Gwynne and Ayers.

== Unofficial Ladder ==
| Pos | Team | Pld | W | L | D | GF | GA | |
|---|---|---|---|---|---|---|---|---|
| 1 | Adelaide | 4 | 4 | 0 | 0 | 11 | 1 | Unofficial Premiers (undefeated) |
| 2 | Kapunda | 1 | 1 | 0 | 0 | 2 | 1 | Defeated Gawler |
| 3 | Woodville (Port Suburban) | 2 | 0 | 2 | 0 | 1 | 4 | Lost both matches to Adelaide |
| 4 | Gawler | 2 | 0 | 2 | 0 | 1 | 5 | Lost to Adelaide and Kapunda |
| 5 | Military (14th Regiment) | 1 | 0 | 1 | 0 | 0 | 4 | Lost to Adelaide |

Source: Match Reports

== Summary of Results - North Adelaide v St Peter's Collegiate ==
| Pos | Team | Pld | W | L | D | GF | GA |
|---|---|---|---|---|---|---|---|
| 1 | North Adelaide | 3 | 1 | 1 | 1 | 6 | 3 |
| 2 | St Peter's Collegiate | 3 | 1 | 1 | 1 | 3 | 6 |

Source: Match Reports
