= Woodville Football Club (1868–1877) =

Australian rules football club

Woodville Football Club (1875–1877) Woodville Football Club (1870–1871) Port Suburban Football Club (1868–1870)
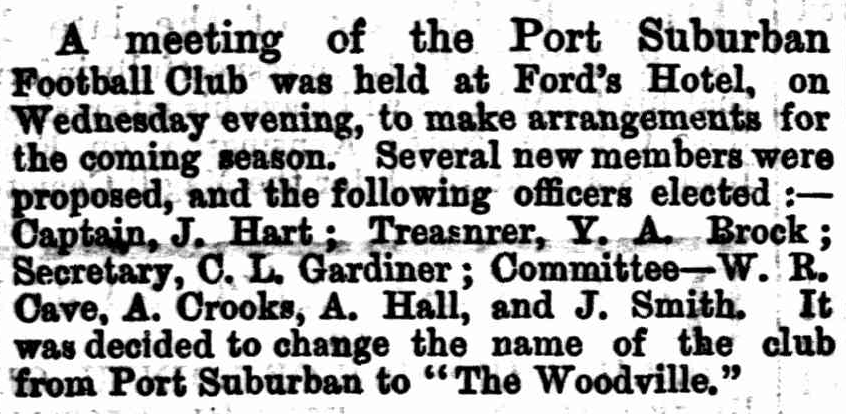

Names
- Full name: Woodville Football Club
- Former name: Port Suburban Football Club

1877 season
- Home-and-away season: 5th

Club details
- Founded: 16 May 1868
- Dissolved: 15 September 1877 (SAFA)
- Colours: Dark Blue (1877)
- Competition: SAFA 1877
- Ground: Woodville

The Woodville Football Club (SAFA) was an Australian rules football club formed in 1875 that participated in the foundation year of the South Australian Football Association in 1877. An earlier club known as the Port Suburban Football Club from 1868–1870 and then Woodville disbanded in 1872. It is not related to the Woodville Football Club formed in 1938 and which competed in the South Australia Amateur League (SAAL) until it was admitted to the SANFL in 1959.

== First Football game – Woodville vs Port Suburban ==
The first game was played on 16 May 1868 between sides representing the Woodville Cricket Club against those from the Port Suburban Cricket Club.

== Early Interclub Woodville and Port Suburban (1868) ==
In May 1868 it was reported – The manly game of football has come into vogue this season in the Port Adelaide district, Woodville being the chosen place where the different matches take place. The first of the season was commenced by the Port Suburban (late) Cricket Club playing on 16 May, since which time the fun has been kept up on each Saturday afternoon. On 30 May a match took place between the Woodville and Port Suburban Clubs, which resulted in the latter club obtaining three goals. On the previous Saturday the Woodvilles obtained two goals and the Suburbans one. The game creates great amusement, and the inhabitants of the neighboring villages turn out in large numbers to witness the sport.

A ladies yearly bag match was advertised for 3 July 1868 at Woodville between 15 members of the Adelaide Football Club and 20 residents of Port Adelaide and suburbs (Port and Suburban Football Club). The yearly bag, made up by the ladies in and about Adelaide, the bag containing a variety of useful and ornamental articles, and the match for which it is played was generally considered the most interesting of any during the season and the most keenly contested. The following were the advertised players on the Adelaide side : Horn, Malcolm, Aldridge, Gwynne, Kingston, Samson, Considine, Taylor, Sparks, Crooks, Smith, Milne, O'Halloran, Holland, and Price.

== Port Suburban (1869) ==
In 1869 the club referred to itself as 'Port Suburban' and played its games at Woodville with teams chosen by which side of Port Road they lived - East or West.

The first general meeting of the Port Suburban Football Club was held at the Exchange Hotel, on Thursday evening 8 April 1869. The proposed new Adelaide rules were discussed, and the following officers were elected – Captain Mr. H. D. O'Halloran, Committee Messrs. Crooks, Hall and Walters, Secretary Mr. C. L. Gardiner.

== Port Suburban renamed Woodville (1870) ==
The club changed its name from Port Suburban to "The Woodvilles" at a meeting held at the Ford's Hotel on Wednesday 11 May 1870. J. Hart was elected Captained. The next day a new club Port Adelaide was formed as joint football and cricket club.

== Woodville Football Club Meeting (1871) ==
A meeting of the Woodville Football Club was advertised to be held at the Ship Inn, on Friday evening, the 14th April 1871, at 8:30pm by T. A. Brock, Hon. Secretary. There was no record of match reports for 1871 hence it appears that the old Woodvilles had disbanded.

== Second Incarnation (1875) ==
In 1875, a meeting was held at the Half-Way House, Woodville on Tuesday, March 9, at 8 o'clock p.m. The club secretary was G. Le Gay Holthouse. On Saturday afternoon, April 3, the members of the newly-formed Woodville Football Club played their first color match, on the grounds of Mrs. Terrell, at Woodville. A number of Terrell brothers played for the club including Fred and his younger brother Arthur who both joined Norwood in 1878.

Woodville played the opening game of the 1875 Football Season against Port Adelaide with a large attendance of spectators at Glanville. The side was captained by J.Beck and lost by 1 goal to nil. The return match against Port Adelaide was played on 5 June with the club losing 2 goals to nil.

The club also played matches against Adelaide, Gawler, Kensington and the Victorians who were based at North Adelaide. Of the 8 reported matches they Won and Drew against Adelaide but lost the other 6 games.

Players in 1875 – Annells, Baker, Beck, Brock, Brailey, Dale, Darby, Formby, Holthouse, Hay, Ive, Jenkins, Lines, Letchford, Lines, Newman, Osborne, Rumball, Stevens, Taylor, Trimmer, Terrell (3), Townsend, Young (2).

Woodville Club played their closing game for the 1875 season at Woodville on Saturday 18 September between two teams Blues (Captain Mr. T. Terrell) and Black and Whites (Captain Mr. J. Beck) starting at 3pm played in 2 halves of approximately 1 hour each. The Blues team kicked two goals – one in each half which brought the half time adjournment and rest under the shady gum trees and then end of play. Goal scorers for the Blues – James Young and A. Formby.

== SAFA foundation club (1877) ==
Woodville following an internal match elected two delegates (Captain J.Osborne and T. Letchford) to the inaugural meeting of the SAFA.

Woodville participated in the inaugural 1877 SAFA season winning 5 of its 16 matches to finish 5th out of 8 teams. Internal disputes during the season lead to resignations of senior players from the club and having to play junior players towards the end of the season to field a team.

A general meeting of the club was held at The Halfway House, Woodville, on Thursday evening, 5 July 1877. The business had reference to the recent appointment of Mr. O. Formby as Vice-Captain, and the Woodville and Port members refused to allow anyone else to be elected to the office. There was some discussion, and Messrs. J. Clarke and J. R. Osborn tendered their resignations, which were accepted. The proceedings then closed satisfactorily.

== Dissolution of Senior SAFA Club (1877) and Defection of Leading Players to form Norwood (1878) ==
Woodville's last scheduled senior SAFA game for 15 September against Port Adelaide at Woodville fell through due to a lack of players (their principal players being involved in a practice cricket match at Norwood).

The senior club dissolved from the SAFA and a number of Woodville's leading players, including the captain Joe. R. (Joseph Rowe) Osborne, formed a new club called the Norwood Football Club on 28 February 1878. The new Norwood club even took over the Woodville blue colour guernsey.

Notable players of the Woodville Football Club in 1877 who helped formed the Norwood Club were Captain J.R. (Joseph Rowe) Osborn (who would become Norwood's Inaugural Captain in 1878), George Giffen (who played for Norwood 1878–1885), A.S. (Algernon Sidney) Young (who played for Norwood 1878–1880) and the brothers Tom Letchford (who played for Norwood 1878–1881) and younger brother Fred Letchford (who played for Norwood 1878–1886)

== Woodville Club (1878) ==
Woodville Football Club participated in matches against the following junior clubs in 1878 - Albert Park, North Park and South Terrace. Club Captain was Lucas. The club also had a second twenty team.

== Woodville Club (1879) ==
Woodville Football Club participated in matches against the following junior clubs in 1879 – North Park and Prince Alfred College. Club Captain was H. Smith.

== Reformation of Junior Club (1881) ==
1881 – A meeting to consider the desirability of forming a football club at Woodville was held at the local institute on Tuesday 5 April. There was a good attendance and about thirty members were enrolled. The following were the officers elected - Patron, Mr. Connor; president, Mr. DeMole; vice-presidents, Messrs. T. Roberts, J.L. Simpson, H. Hanson. R. Honey, T. Wright, J. Rawlings, and G. Baker; captain, Mr. R.Lucas; vice-captain, Mr. T. E. Kent; secretary and treasurer, Mr.F. J. Rawlings; committee, Messrs. F. Filgate and A. E. Norman, together with captain, vice-captain, and secretary. It was decided that the colours should be dark blue.

1882 – The annual meeting of the club was held in the Woodville Institute on Thursday 23 March. There was a very good attendance, Mr. Forrester presiding. The report showed a balance in hand of £5 10s. Fourteen new members were elected, and the following officers were chosen :—President, Mr. T. Roberts; Vice-presidents, Messrs. Bower, M.P., G. A. Connor, W. Russell, R. Honey, W. Thow, H.C. Fletcher, W. Forrester, G. Baker, H. Hanson, J. Rawlings, G. DeMole, and L. McLaren. The working officers were elected as follows:— Captain, H. F. Nicholls; Vice-captain, J. E. Short; Secretary, A E. Norman; Treasurer, F. J. Rawlings; Committee — T. Fletcher, G. H. Downer, F. A. Howell, E. Grant, and W. Terrell. The meeting closed with votes of thanks.

1883 – it was reported that Woodville had merged with Semaphore and that they had joined the Adelaide and Suburban Association. Last year the Semaphores were a weak team, but by amalgamating with the Woodvilles they have been enabled to send one of the best junior twenties into the field.

1898 – Woodville joined the Port Adelaide and Suburban Junior Football association.

1899 – The annual meeting of the Woodville Football club was held in the Woodville Institute on Wednesday 15 March and there was a good attendance of members. The secretary read the report and balance-sheet, which showed a credit balance of £1 14s. 8d. The following officers were elected:—Captain. H. H. Brooks: vice-captain. K. Wilson. secretary and treasurer. R. E. Oaten; delegates TO the Port Adelaide and Suburban Junior Association, R. E. Oaten. G. Godson, and H. H. Brooks: selection committee, H. Vagg, W. Whait, E. Brooks, H. H. Brooks, and R. E. Oaten: executive committee, H. Vagg, F. Simpson, G. Godson. T. Fergus, H. C Oaten, H. H. Brooks, and R. E. Oaten.

== Notable players ==
Allen Martin
George Giffen – also played for Norwood and was a cricketer who played for South Australia and Australia.
Joseph Rowe Osborn – Woodville Captain 1876-1877, played for Richmond club in Melbourne (1871–74), resigned from Woodville and formed the Norwood Football Club in 1878. He was captain for their first 3 premierships Premierships: 1878, 1879, 1880
Arthur Terrell – also played for Norwood from 1878 to 1879 before embarking on a business career. Victoria

== Honour roll ==
Club honour roll
Old Woodville/Port Suburban - 1st Incarnation
Year	Pos	Games	Wins	Losses	Draws	Goals For	Goals Against	Captain	Comments
1869	3rd	2	0	2	0	1	4	J. Hart; A. Crooks	Lost both matches to Adelaide
1870	4th	3	0	1	2	1	6	J. Hart; A. Crooks	Port Suburban renamed to "The Woodville" on 11 May 1870
Woodville (pre SAFA) - 2nd Incarnation
Year	Pos	Games	Wins	Losses	Draws	Goals For	Goals Against	Captain	Comments
1875	8th	8	1	6	1	4	16		
1876	6th	14	6	6	2	13	12	J.R. Osborne	
Woodville (SAFA)
Year	Pos	Games	Wins	Losses	Draws	Goals For	Goals Against	Captain	Comments
1877	5th	16	5	9	2	18	12	J.R. Osborne; J.A. Atkins	Osborne resigned from Club on 5 July 1877.

== See also ==
- List of SANFL Clubs
- Category:Former South Australian National Football League clubs
- Woodville Football Club
- Woodville-West Torrens Football Club
