= Mount Rat, South Australia =

Mount Rat Wauraltee, South Australia
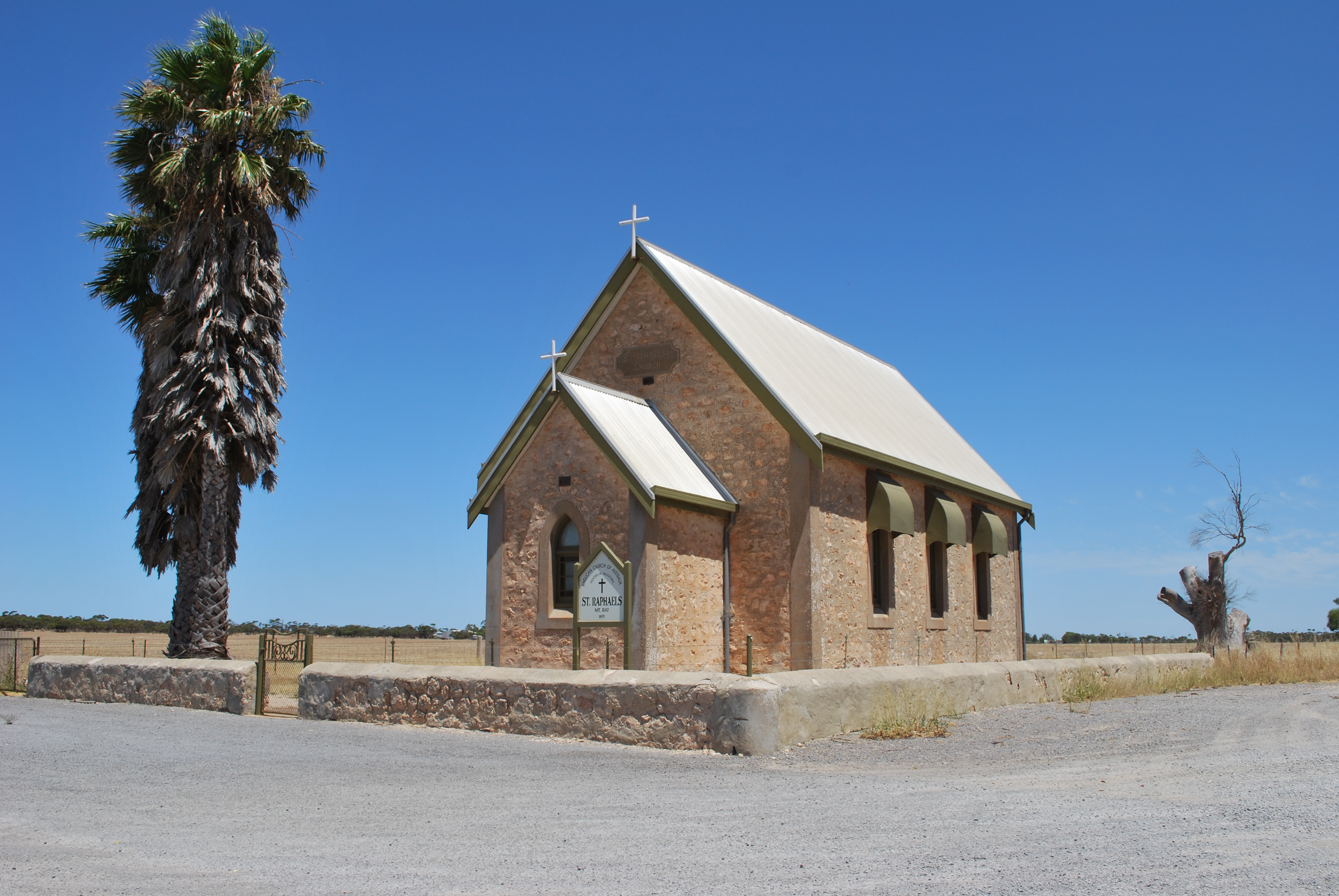
- St Raphael's Anglican church

- Coordinates: 34°37′40″S 137°35′53″E
- Established: 1850s
- Elevation: 134 m (440 ft)

Mount Rat is a former subdivision in South Australia located in the locality of Wauraltee on the Yorke Peninsula. It is located near the junction of the Spencer Highway and Mount Rat Road about halfway between the centres of Maitland and Minlaton.

It was first founded in the 1850s, and by 1882 had a school, hotel, blacksmiths, chapel and a large water tank. In 1877, Church of England services commenced at the Mount Rat Post Office as there was no church building.

The success of the area in the growing of wheat helped to make the case for a much needed jetty at nearby Port Rickaby.

By 1905 the school had closed, and now the town has mostly disappeared.

The Anglican church was dedicated to the Archangel Raphael in 1945 by the Rt. Rev. B. P. Robin.

There are presently two water tanks and a telecommunications tower at Mount Rat.

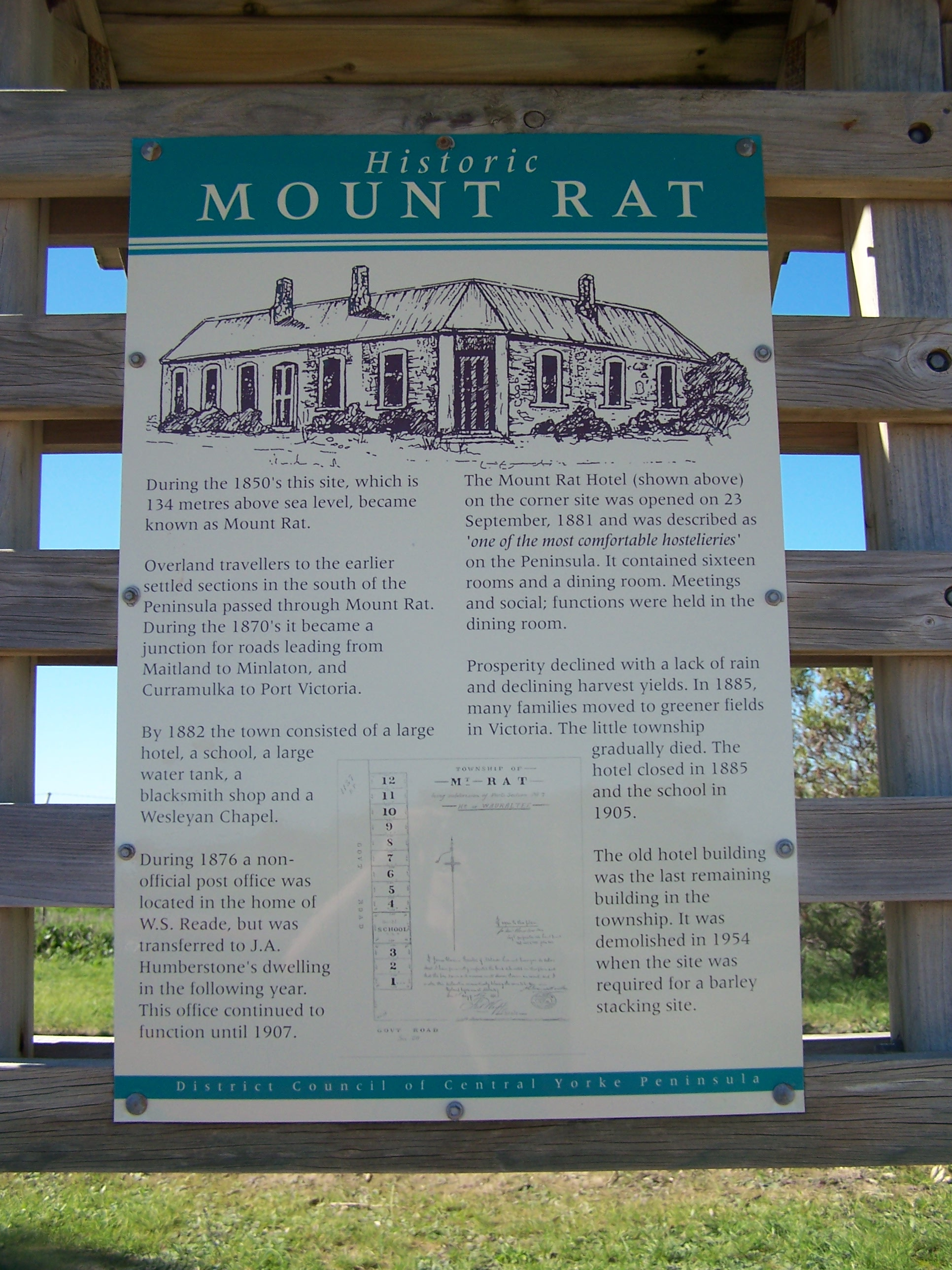
A close-up of the information sign.
