= Young Australian Football Club =

Australian rules football club

Names
- Full name: Union Cricket and Football Club
- Former name: Young Australian Football Club

Club details
- Founded: 11 May 1870
- Dissolved: 1872
- Colours: Blue White
- Premierships: Pre SAFA - 1870 (Unofficial)
- Ground: North Parklands, Adelaide

The Young Australian Football Club was an early Australian rules football club based in North Adelaide, South Australia that was unofficially the premier club during the 1870 South Australian football season. The club had two wins and three draws from five games which included a win, when they scored two goals to nil, over the Port Adelaide Football Club in the closing game of the season.

== Establishment ==
The Young Australian Football Club was established on the 11 May 1870, at the Royal Oak Hotel, North Adelaide. A dozen persons were present and Mr. W. L. Wyly was appointed Secretary and Treasurer, and Messrs. Mellor, Harrison, Holthouse, Simms, and Randall the committee. Blue and white were decided upon as the colors. It was decided to challenge the Port Suburban Club for the opening game.

== Interclub Matches (1870) ==
A football match between the Young Australian and Woodville Club with 18 on each side was played on the practice ground near the Railway Station, Woodville, on Saturday, May 28. Messrs. J. C. Smith (blue) and J. Hart jun. (pink) acted as captains for the respective sides. Play commenced shortly after 3 o'clock, and after about 20 minutes vigorous play a goal was scored for the Young Australians by J. C. Smith. In the course of about an hour and a half spirited play two more goals were added to the score of the Young Australians — the first by Murray, and the second by Conigrave. The game was continued for a short time afterwards, when the Woodville men succeeded in scoring one. Just as this goal was gained the train approached, and a hasty departure had to be made by the Adelaide team to reach the station. But few of the players succeeded in reaching it before it moved off, and those left behind, after waiting for an hour, returned to Adelaide by the next train. The weather was beautifully fine, and the game was witnessed by a large number of spectators. Final score - three goals having been gained by the Young Australians and one by the Woodvilles.

A return match with the Woodville Club was advertised to be played in the afternoon on Saturday 2 July 1870 on the South Australian Cricket Ground. Play to commence at 3 o'clock.

A match was advertised on Saturday 30 July 1870 to be played on the Adelaide Football Grounds to commence at 3 o'clock in the afternoon between the Young Australians and Port Adelaide Football Club which was formed on 12 May 1870. On Saturday afternoon, July 30, a foot-ball match was played on the North Park Lands between the Young Australians and Port Adelaide Clubs. The Portonians assembled in force, having their whole team of 16, whilst the Young Australians had great difficulty in mustering half that number; however with the aid of a substitute or two the game was commenced. The Young Australians were captained by Mr. J. C. Smith, and the Portonians by Mr. J. Wald. After some smart play the Portonians succeeded in getting the first goal, which was kicked by Wald. The Young Australians got one goal also, which was kicked in fine style by W. Higgins. The ground was very slippery, and the falls were numerous. The game concluded at half-past 5 o clock, each side having got one goal. The return match will be played at Port Adelaide at some future date.

A match was advertised to be played on the North Park Lands on Saturday, the 6th August 1870, between the YOUNG AUSTRALIAN and PORT SUBURBAN FOOTBALL CLUBS. Play to commence at 1.30 p.m. The following are the sides:—
Young Australian (Blue)—J. C. Smith, R. Murray, Harrison, Higgins, Reade, Randall, Sharp, Sanders, Aldridge, Conigrave, Milne, Townsend, Monteith, Nesbit, Phillips, Wetherick, Masters, and Dale.
Port Suburban(Pink)—Clair, Crooks, Formby, E. Dale, C. Dale, Martin, Sinclair, Granfield, Stone, Blair, Ferguson, Hudson, Counsell, Brock, Slater, Harvey, Dempster, and Warren.
The Concordia Band has been engaged to be on the grounds if fine weather. It is to be hoped that the Young Australians will show up better this Match than they did in the last.

== Interclub Matches (1871) ==
A football match was played on the grounds of the Prince Alfred College on Saturday, 27 May 1871 between the Young Australian and Prince Alfred College Football Clubs — W.Young and A. Colton acting respectively as captains for the two sides — which resulted in a victory to neither side.

== 1871 General Meeting / Club Renames to Union Cricket and Football Club ==
A general meeting of the Young Australian Football Club was held at the Committee-Room, Prince Alfred Hotel, on Wednesday, August 16, 1871, with Mr. F. C. Aldridge presiding. It was resolved that as the football season was closing, and there being a Cricket Club called the Young Australians, the name be changed to the Union Cricket and Football Club. The following officers were elected:— F. C. Aldridge, Captain; W. E. Dalton, Hon. Sec.; S. H. Goode, W. A. Hughes, W. G. Nash, B.Moulden, and W. H. Young, Committee for the half-year ending February 29, 1872.

== 1872 Half Year General Meeting ==
A general meeting of the Union Cricket and Football Club held at the Prince Alfred Hotel on Friday evening, 8 March 1872, there was a fair attendance, and Mr. F. C. Aldridge presided. The committee's report and balance-sheet were read and adopted. After slight alterations to the regulations the following officers were elected:— Mr.F. C. Aldridge, Captain; Mr. J. James, Secretary: Messrs. Harvey, Hughes, Lawrence, Lucas, and DeCean, Committee.

The club dissolved in 1872.
