= Henry Sparks =

Australian businessman and civic leader

Henry Yorke Sparks (c. 1845 – 21 October 1900) was a businessman of South Australia, and a director of the South Australian Company.

Henry was born in Montevideo where his father Henry P(alafox) G(erona) Sparks (c. 1810 – 18 April 1870), a Liverpool merchant, his wife Sarah (c. 1816 – 5 January 1898) and family had settled. To escape the turmoil which had erupted in Uruguay, he chartered the brig Bernard (240 tons, Crawney master) and sailed to South Australia, arriving in Adelaide in May 1853. He gained an appointment as accountant for the Water Board. Henry attended John Whinham's North Adelaide Grammar School, where he was a prize-winning student, then entered the office of Sir John Morphett. He next secured a post with the Bank of South Australia, then Elder, Smith, & Co., and finally in 1880, the Mortgage Company of South Australia as its foundation manager. On 26 June 1894, he was appointed manager of the South Australian Company, succeeding William J. Brind, and still held that position at the time of his death.

He also held directorships in the Executor, Trustee, and Agency Co., and the Glenelg Railway Company. He was a member of the Adelaide Society of Accountants.

== Sporting and civic ==
Henry, a keen athlete, was secretary of Old Adelaide Football Club and the South Australian Cricketing Association (succeeding John Pickering) and made a life member, the Adelaide Rowing Club, and the Glenelg Oval Association. He was foremost in the founding of the Adelaide Oval, the Adelaide Amateur Athletic Club, and the Glenelg Oval. He donated the Waterhouse Cup to the Holdfast Bay Yacht Club. He was appointed Justice of the Peace around 1880.

He was a Synodsman of the Church of England Christ Church, North Adelaide and a member of the North Adelaide Young Men's Society.

He was from around 1890 a resident of Glenelg, and in 1898 was elected mayor of Glenelg council (now the City of Holdfast Bay). In 1899 he presented the Council with its mayoral chair, designed by the previous mayor, G. K. Soward and constructed of timbers from the wreck of HMS Buffalo.

He died during the night of 20 October 1900 of a heart attack.

His wife was a noted poultry breeder.

== Family ==
Henry Palafox Gerona Sparks (c. 1810 – 18 April 1870) married Sarah Waterworth (c. 1816 – 5 January 1898). Among their children were:

- Henry Yorke Sparks (c. 1845 – 21 October 1900) and his wife Sarah Thomas Sparks (c. 1856 – 17 May 1935) had five daughters, among them:

- eldest Sarah Wynne Yorke "Wynnie" Sparks (15 February 1886 – 14 January 1953) married Charles Edward "Ken" Barritt (c. 1878 – 9 August 1928) on 27 October 1909; lived at Mallara Station Wentworth, New South Wales and had residence "Mallara" West terrace, Kensington Gardens. Their only son Kenneth Charles (c. 1919 – 17 July 1942) was killed in Egypt during World War II.
- second daughter Gladys ( – 1954) married George Cobbett Botten (22 February 1881 – 22 January 1981) on 17 August 1912.
- third daughter Dorrit Yorke Sparks (died 1970) married (1) John Hamilton "Jack" Pile on 30 March 1912, grandson of James Pile. Jack was licensee of the Reservoir Hotel, Thorndon Park. They had son, also named John Hamilton Pile (13 March 1915 – ). They divorced in 1931 and she married again, on 3 May 1932, to divorcé Daniel Cashel Cudmore (10 February 1881 – 1966).
- Ida Yorke Sparks (c. 1890 ) married Aubert Mussen Jackson (c. 1879 – 10 June 1934) on 22 March 1911; lived at Tarcoola Station Wentworth, New South Wales, part owner Kara Station.
Their home was in Woodville then from 1891, "Waterworth", (later Waterworth Guest House) 11 Pier Street, Glenelg.

- Ida Sparks ( – 7 November 1881) lived at Mount Pleasant, South Australia;
- Flora (c. 1847 – 13 August 1901) married Thomas Charles Reade in 1871 and lived at Mount Rat, Yorke Peninsula;
- Stanley (c. 1850 – 4 February 1874 at sea)
- Harold Sparks (1853 – 6 March 1913) was born at sea, married (1) Annie Richardson (c. 1855 – 18 May 1889) on 6 January 1877, (2) Eliza Louisa Richardson (first wife's sister) on 9 June 1890. He was a councillor and land speculator in Moorabbin, Victoria.
- Conrad (c. 1855 – 4 January 1867) drowned in the River Murray
