= S. G. Kingston =

Australian lawyer

Strickland Gough Kingston (1848 – 3 October 1897), usually referred to by his initials or as "Pat", was a prominent lawyer in South Australia. He was a brother of Charles Kingston, who was Premier of South Australia from 1893 to 1899. Brilliant but unstable, he died by his own hand.

In mid-September 1897, Kingston was reportedly confident about his success in a legal action. He took it badly when the verdict went the other way, and he was reportedly depressed for some time. In early October 1897, he received news of one of his clients having withdrawn from a case. He then shot himself through the heart with a Martini-Henry sporting rifle at his office. He died shortly after.

== History ==
Kingston was born in Adelaide the elder son of (later Sir) George Kingston, an Irish-born surveyor, landowner and parliamentarian. He was educated at Adelaide Educational Institution, where he was considered, with his brother and (later Dr.) Joseph Verco, one of its three brightest students. He was also a fine athlete and sportsman, excelling in long-distance running, jumping, boxing and on the football field. On leaving school he found employment with the Bank of Australasia (Samuel Tomkinson was manager at the time), then decided to study law. Samuel Way took him on as an articled clerk, then when in 1876 Way was elevated to Chief Justice of South Australia, his articles were transferred to Josiah Symon, Way's partner.

Kingston was admitted to the bar in April 1879 and joined his brother in partnership as Kingston & Kingston, solicitors, with offices in Eagle Chambers, Pirie Street. The practice was successful, but cut short by a stupid act on (S. G.) Kingston's part: On Sunday 8 June 1884 around 4 pm Kingston, carrying a saloon rifle in a bag, boarded a cab (Note: Perhaps a brougham or similar, where the driver sits forward of the passenger, rather that a hansom, where the driver is behind and less vulnerable to stupid pranks) operated by one Patrick Guerrin, who sported a tall felt hat "after the American pattern".

He had been carried along Pirie Street as far as Hindmarsh Square when he took it into his head to put a bullet through the "topper" of the cabman, but whether through carelessness, inebriation or (as Kingston claimed) a sudden lurch of the vehicle, the slug went low and lodged in Guerrin's scalp. The cabman immediately ejected Kingston, and appears to have demanded money (perhaps £1000, then £300) to avoid a criminal charge, which Kingston refused. Kingston was duly charged, convicted and jailed for six months, confounding skeptics, who predicted he would, by virtue of his profession and connections, somehow be treated lightly.

By this time Charles Kingston, who dearly loved his older brother, had been appointed Attorney-General in the Colton Cabinet and dropped his legal practice; otherwise it is likely that despite his brother's mad action and consequent disgrace, their business partnership would have been renewed. Certainly he never distanced himself from his aberrant brother.

In January 1885 Kingston returned to legal practice in the old offices, and appears to have had no shortage of clients. In March 1886 he moved to offices in Lipson Street, Port Adelaide, then in July 1889 to Church Street, Port Augusta. He was an extremely clever lawyer and was able by sophisticated arguments to save many wealthy clients from the legal consequences of their actions.

"The Chairman caused some amusement by reading a cutting reporting the trial before justices at Port Augusta of two cases in which the defendants were charged by the District Council of Woolundunga with neglecting to destroy rabbits. In both cases Mr. N. A. Webb appeared for the District Council, and Mr. S. G. Kingston for the defendants. So far as reported the cases seemed exactly similar, but the results were widely different. In the first one Hannah Tapley pleaded guilty, and was promptly fined £2 and costs. Mr. Andrew Tennant appears to have been better advised and pleaded not guilty, and the information was dismissed. The arguments of Mr. S. G. Kingston appear to have completely capsized the justices, and were most ingenious. "There was no proof that such a council as that of Woolundunga existed," "there was no proof that the Chairman Mr. W. Q. Pryor held that office," and "there was no proof that the council authorised the notice which appeared in the Government Gazette." Of course there is no suggestion that Mr. Tennant got off because he was a rich man. It was doubtless miserable Hannah Tapley's own fault in speaking the truth that caused her to be fined."

=== Death ===
Around mid-September 1897 Kingston was in Adelaide to appear in an action being heard before the Supreme Court, and expressed to his brother-in-law Hubert Giles his confidence in the outcome. He took it badly however when the verdict went the other way. Canon W. S. Hopcraft of St John's Church, Adelaide, a longtime friend and confidante, reported that he took this loss personally, and was not seen sober for several days. Back in Port Augusta, Kingston, never a temperate man, and frequently driven to excessive drinking, "had been in a very depressed state of mind for some time" and was suffering the after-effects of a heavy night when he received news of a client having withdrawn from a case, though there is no indication that precipitated what happened next. He shot himself through the heart with a Martini-Henry sporting rifle at his office in Church Street at 2.40 pm on 4 October 1897 and died shortly after. Charles Kingston, who had recently returned from a triumphant visit to the United Kingdom, followed by a meeting with the Federation Commission, where he was elected chairman; cancelled all appointments and with his Commissioner of Crown Lands (L. O'Loughlin) was on the 4.30 pm Broken Hill express, and at Petersburg had a "special" waiting to take them to Port Augusta, arriving at 3.45 am. After viewing the body, which caused Charles Kingston great distress, they returned with the coffin by the same train. His remains were deposited in the family mausoleum, West Terrace Cemetery.

== Family ==
On 25 September 1879 Kingston married Kathleen Pittar Stanton ( – 3 June 1929) daughter of Rev. L. W. Stanton, Anglican clergyman at Burra and Kapunda, later of Coombe Keynes, Dorset, England. They had two daughters:

- Kathleen Molly Kingston (1880–1958) married Walter Leslie Stuart ( –1933) in 1901. Walter was an outstanding lawyer, Master of the Supreme Court in 1913 then convicted of embezzlement in 1932, died in hospital.
- Dorothy Kingston (c. 1882 – 1965)

He was described as a loving father, but it is likely he and his wife had separated: at the time of his death Kathleen Kingston had been living with her sister Phoebe Stanton in Glenelg for some years, and may have never stayed in Port Augusta. Her sister ran "Blanche Villa", a boarding school on the Broadway, Glenelg.
