= Charles Kingston =

Australian politician (1850–1908)

The Right Honourable Charles Kingston PC
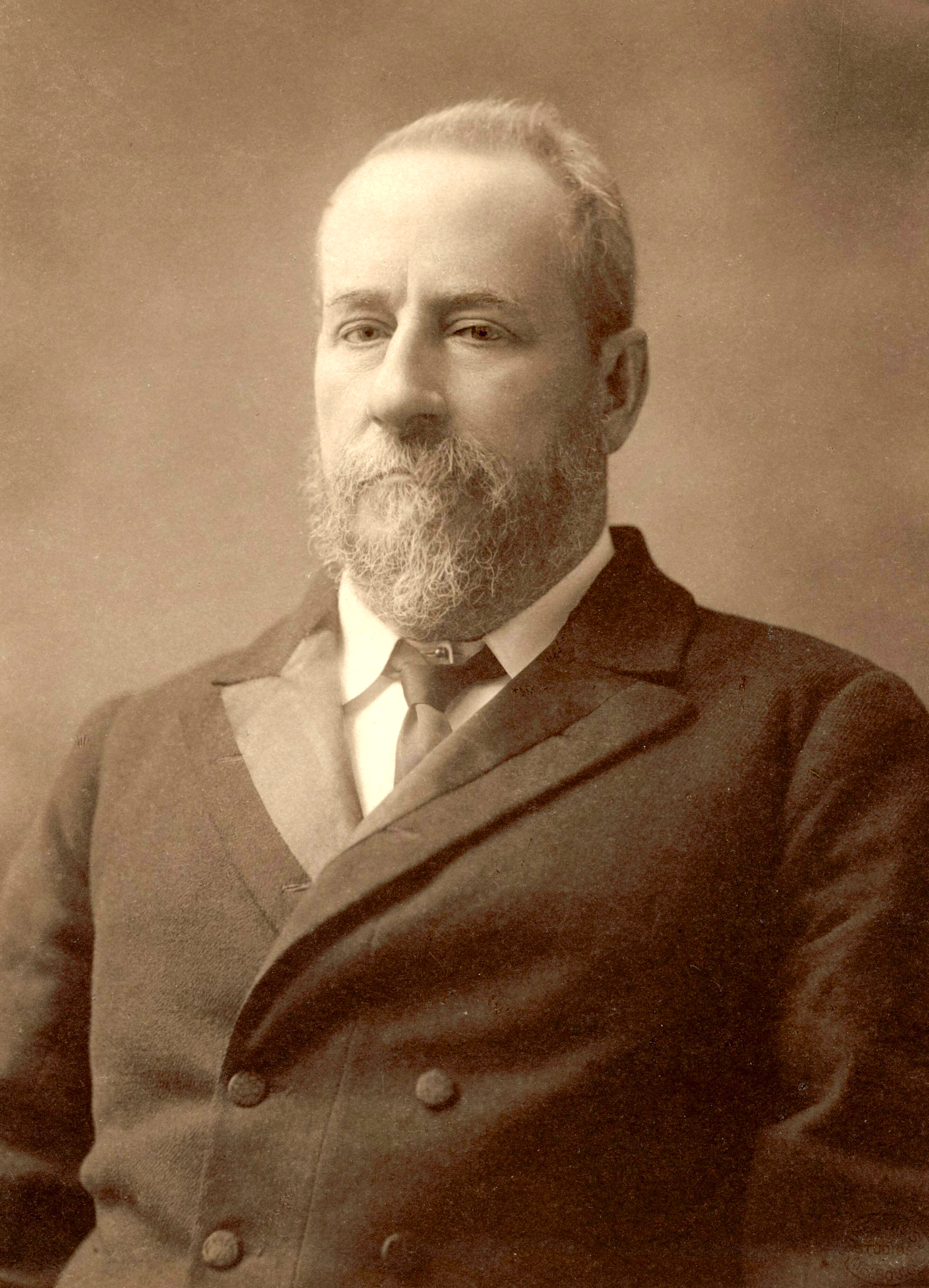

20th Premier of South Australia
- In office 16 June 1893 – 1 December 1899
- Monarch: Victoria
- Governor: Earl of Kintore; Sir Thomas Buxton
- Preceded by: John Downer
- Succeeded by: Vaiben Louis Solomon

Minister for Trade and Customs
- In office 1 January 1901 – 24 July 1903
- Prime Minister: Edmund Barton
- Preceded by: position established
- Succeeded by: William Lyne

Member of the House of Representatives
- In office 30 March 1901 – 11 May 1908
- Preceded by: constituency established
- Succeeded by: Ernest Roberts
- Constituency: South Australia (1901-1903); Adelaide (1903-1908)

Attorney-General of South Australia
- In office 16 June 1893 – 1 December 1899
- Preceded by: Robert Homburg
- Succeeded by: Paddy Glynn
- In office 11 June 1887 – 27 June 1889
- Preceded by: John Downer
- Succeeded by: Beaumont Moulden
- In office 16 June 1884 – 16 June 1885
- Preceded by: John Downer
- Succeeded by: John Downer

Member of the South Australian Legislative Council
- In office 22 September 1900 – 31 December 1900
- Constituency: Central District 1

Member of the South Australian House of Assembly
- In office 8 April 1881 – 7 February 1900
- Preceded by: W.K. Simms
- Succeeded by: Bill Denny
- Constituency: West Adelaide

Personal details
- Born: Charles Cameron Kingston; 22 October 1850 Adelaide, South Australia
- Died: 11 May 1908 (aged 57) Adelaide, South Australia
- Party: Liberal; Protectionist
- Spouse: Lucy May McCarthy
- Parent(s): George Strickland Kingston and Ludovina Catherina De Silva Kingston (née Cameron)

Charles Cameron Kingston PC (22 October 1850 – 11 May 1908) was an Australian politician. From 1893 to 1899 he was Premier of South Australia, leading a coalition of Radicals supported by the Labor Party.

Kingston won the 1893, 1896 and 1899 colonial elections against the conservatives. During his time as Premier, Kingston was responsible for such measures as electoral reform including the first law to give votes to women in Australia (and second in the world only to New Zealand), a legitimation Act, the first conciliation and arbitration act in Australia, establishment of a state bank, a high protective tariff, regulation of factories, a progressive system of land, and income taxation, a public works program, and more extensive workers' compensation.

A leading advocate of federation, Kingston contributed extensively at a practical level to bringing it about. Elected to the House of Representatives with the most votes amongst the seven candidates in the single statewide Division of South Australia at the 1901 national election, he aligned himself with the Protectionist Party, going on to represent the Division of Adelaide at the election two years later.

He was also one of the main proponents of what was later termed the White Australia policy, arguing strongly against Chinese immigration. In his capacity as representative of South Australia, he attended an 1888 conference in Sydney that proposed changes to the migration laws of the time.

== Early life ==
Kingston was born in Adelaide on 22 October 1850. He was the youngest of six children born to Luduvina Catherina Da Silva (née Cameron) and George Strickland Kingston. His father, a widower who had re-married, was born in Ireland and trained as an architect and engineer in England. He was appointed deputy surveyor-general for the new Province of South Australia and arrived in 1836 on board the First Fleet. Kingston's mother was the daughter of military officer Charles Cameron and his Portuguese-born wife Luduvina Rosa Da Silva, who married in 1812 during the Peninsular War. She later became the step-daughter of seaman and pastoralist John Finnis, following her father's early death.

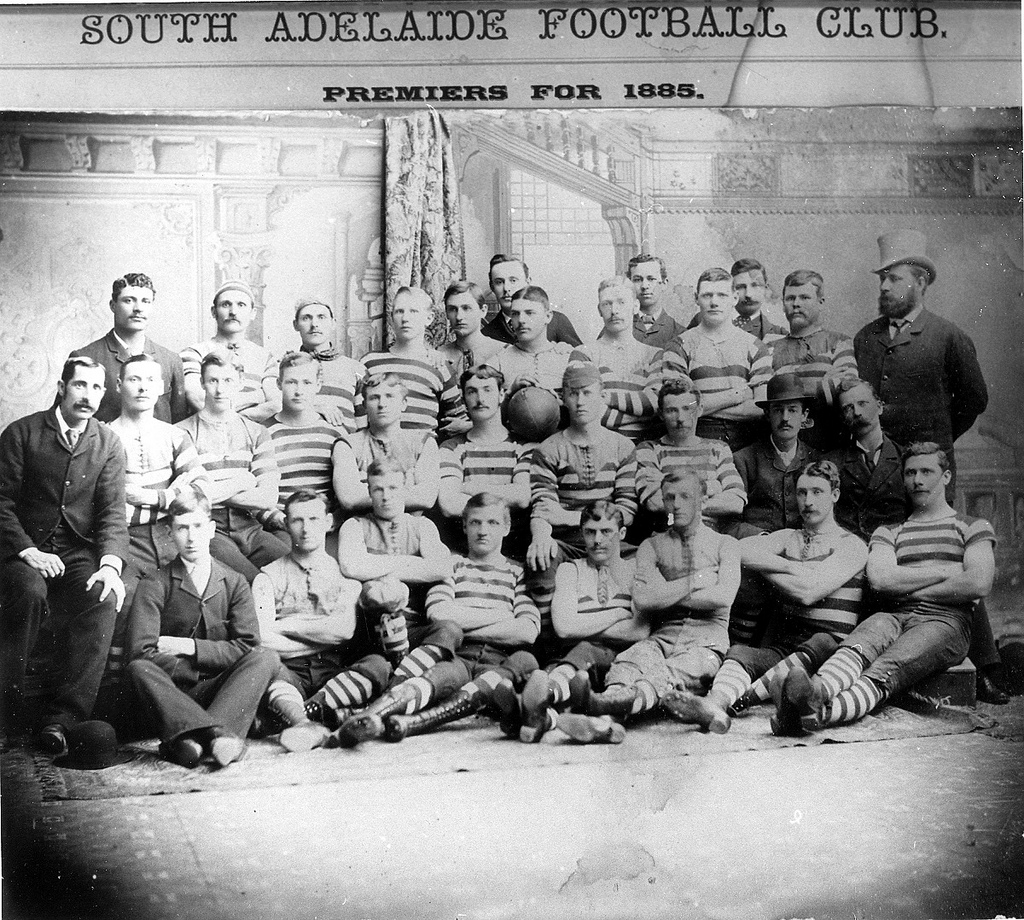
Members of the South Adelaide Football Club, premiers 1885; Kingston is standing in the back row, far right, wearing a top hat.

Kingston's mother died in 1851 at the age of 27, after which he and his siblings were probably raised by servants as their father was heavily involved in business and political activities. In 1856 he married Emma Berry, the widowed daughter of harbourmaster Thomas Lipson, but had no further children. Kingston formed a close bond with his older brother Strickland. At an early age he was sent to John Lorenzo Young's Adelaide Educational Institution, where he regularly won awards and had a talent for mathematics. His schoolmate Joseph Verco later recalled him as "distinctly rough in manner and rather disposed to bully those younger and smaller than himself [...] very disposed to mischief, practical and horse-play". He left the school at the end of 1867 and decided to study law, beginning his articles of clerkship in March 1868 with future attorney-general Samuel Way.

Kingston was called to the bar in 1873, despite the objection of the elder brother of his future wife, Lucy May McCarthy on the grounds of Kingston's alleged seduction of her. He became a QC in 1889.

In 1873 Kingston married Lucy McCarthy, who was disabled for much of her life. They had no children, but in a remarkable gesture, Lucy took in a child, Kevin Kingston, whom Kingston had fathered with another woman, Elizabeth Watson, in 1883. As a result of the scandal, Kingston was ostracised by Adelaide "society", his contempt for whom he never troubled to conceal. Kevin died in 1902. In 1879 Kingston and his older brother Strickland Gough "Pat" Kingston (1848 – 3 October 1897) formed a business partnership, Kingston & Kingston, which they dissolved in July 1884. S. G. Kingston was a brilliant lawyer but unstable. He was jailed for the gunshot wounding of a cabdriver in June 1884 and killed himself after losing an important case in Port Augusta.

Kingston had a passion for Australian rules football in South Australia and helped formulate its code and was president of the South Adelaide Football Club and chief patron of both South Adelaide football and cricket clubs.

He was a lifelong non-smoker, but on at least one occasion was a guest at a smoke social.

== Colonial politics ==
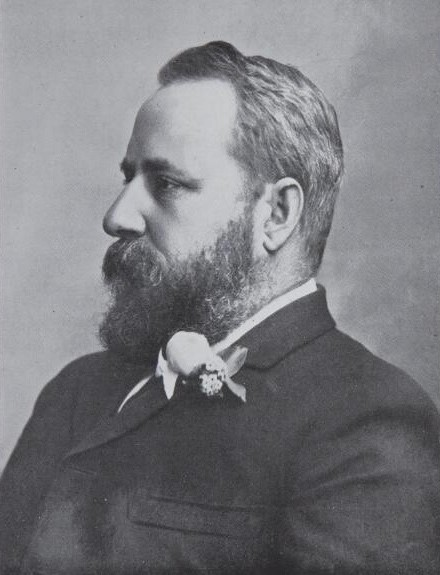
Kingston circa 1900

In April 1881, Kingston was elected to the South Australian House of Assembly as a Radical (left-leaning liberal) representing West Adelaide. He favoured reform of the Legislative Council (which was dominated by wealthy landowners and leaned conservative), government intervention in economic affairs, and Australian federation. He was described by William Maloney as the originator of the White Australia policy; he was heavily involved in developing legislation which restricted the immigration of Chinese laborers.

Kingston was Attorney-General of South Australia from 1884 to 1885 in the government of John Colton and again in 1887–89 in the government of Tom Playford. In 1893, he succeeded Playford as leader of the South Australian liberals and defeated the conservative Premier, John Downer, to become premier. He held the office from 1893 to 1899, a record at the time of six-and-a-half years, not to be broken until Thomas Playford IV's rule in the 1940s. Kingston was also Chief Secretary, Attorney-General and Minister for Industry from 1895 to 1899. His liberal ministry received confidence and supply from the South Australian Labor Party, led by John McPherson, which held the balance of power.

A tall, imposing man with a full beard, a booming voice and a violent, cutting debating style, Kingston dominated the small world of South Australian colonial politics in the 1890s. He was a great hero to liberals, radicals, and trade unions, and much hated by conservatives. In 1892, conservative Richard Baker called him a "coward, a bully and a disgrace to the legal profession" in the Legislative Council and Kingston replied by calling Baker "false as a friend, treacherous as a colleague, mendacious as a man, and utterly untrustworthy in every relationship of public life". Kingston arranged for a duel but Baker had him arrested. Kingston was thus bound over to keep the peace for a year.

Kingston did not support legislation to enfranchise women in time for the 1893 election. After the election, however, his ministers John Cockburn and Frederick Holder and the Woman's Christian Temperance Union lobbied him and convinced him of the political advantages which would accrue to his party by enacting women's suffrage. Women's suffrage in Australia took a leap forward, with the Constitutional Amendment (Adult Suffrage) Act 1894 enacted in 1894 and taking effect from following year's election.

In economic matters, Kingston's government was progressive and statist; it established State Bank of South Australia, regulated factories, imposed death duties, and increased land tax and progressive income taxes.

When Tom Buxton was appointed Governor of South Australia, Kingston was angry that his ministry had not been involved in the decision and so made life as hard as possible for Buxton and his family. The governor's allowance was reduced, and customs duty was charged on its household items (including his wife's invalid carriage).

A leading supporter of Federation, Kingston was a delegate to the Constitutional Conventions of 1891 and 1897 to 1898 which worked to draft an Australian Constitution. In 1897, he travelled to London for the Diamond Jubilee of Queen Victoria, where he was made a Privy Councillor and awarded an honorary Doctor of Civil Laws degree by Oxford University. He also turned down the offer of a knighthood, to the distress of his wife. He lobbied senior British politicians in favour of Australian federation.

In 1899, Kingston's government was defeated in the House on a bill sponsored by an anti-Federationist, but relating to the reform of the Legislative Council, and Kingston resigned as Premier. By then, however, he was more interested in federal politics, as the six Australian colonies moved towards federation. He was a leading figure in the popular movement for federation, and in 1900, he travelled to London with Edmund Barton and Alfred Deakin to oversee the passage of the federation bill through the Parliament of the United Kingdom. While in London he won only 28 percent of votes in a contest to represent the Southern District in the Legislative Council of South Australia, but in September 1900 won 52 percent of votes for the Council's Central district. The establishment of the new Commonwealth of Australia, however, now loomed over events.

The Liberal and Democratic Union was not formed until the 1906 election.

== Federal politics ==
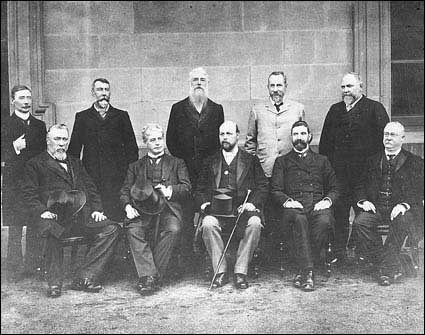
Kingston (standing, second from right) as a member of the first federal Cabinet, January 1901

When the Constitution came into effect on 1 January 1901, Barton formed the first federal ministry, and Kingston was appointed Minister for Trade and Customs. In March 1901, he was elected as one of seven statewide members of the Division of South Australia in the first Australian House of Representatives. Kingston topped the poll, with 65% of the vote; South Australia was not divided into electoral divisions in time for that election. In 1903, he became the first member for the Division of Adelaide. His Central District seat in the Legislative Council was won by George Brookman.

Kingston was a "high protectionist" and favoured very high tariffs to protect Australia's fledgling manufacturing industries. Most of his time as minister was spent negotiating a customs bill through both houses of the Parliament since no party had a majority in either house, and the forces of the Free Trade Party resisted his bill at every stage. Negotiating with his opponents was not among Kingston's many talents, and his bullying style made him many enemies. He also insisted on involving himself in the administrative details of his department and insisted on prosecutions of businesses to enforce his high-tariff policies.

In July 1903, Kingston resigned suddenly in a fit of anger from the opposition of John Forrest and Edmund Barton to his attempt to impose conciliation and arbitration on British and foreign seamen engaged in the Australian coastal trade.

== Final years ==
By the time of his resignation from cabinet, Kingston's health was poor and he was struggling to carry out his departmental duties. Due to financial difficulties he soon returned to his legal practice. He was re-elected unopposed at the 1903 federal election and made his final parliamentary speech in March 1904, which left him exhausted; a month later he was admitted to a private hospital in Melbourne. Following the collapse of Deakin's government, Kingston was offered a place in the new ministry formed by ALP leader Chris Watson. He reluctantly declined on medical advice.

From 1904, Kingston was frequently absent from the House for medical reasons, but was nonetheless re-elected unopposed at the 1906 election. He was nursed by his wife Lucy at their home south of Adelaide, with visitors including John Langdon Bonython noting his obvious mental decline. Lucy was also in poor health and became the subject of derision in society circles following an incident with Jenkin Coles, where she reportedly "set the dogs on him and chased him away, menacing him with a broomstick".

Kingston died in Adelaide on 11 May 1908 following a stroke the previous day, less than a week after the death of his older sister Ludovina. Federal parliament was sitting at the time and adjourned for the day in his honour. A state funeral was held on 13 May and was "one of the largest ever seen in South Australia", with Deakin in attendance. He was buried at the local West Terrace Cemetery, survived by his wife who died in 1919. He left an estate valued at £50 following the payment of debts, excluding two properties held in his wife's name.

== Exhumation ==
Kingston's body was exhumed in March 2008, nearly 100 years after his death because two people thought they may be his direct descendants from one of his illegitimate children. It is claimed that Kingston was ostracised by Adelaide society for his sexual indiscretions and that he fathered at least six illegitimate children.

== Statue ==
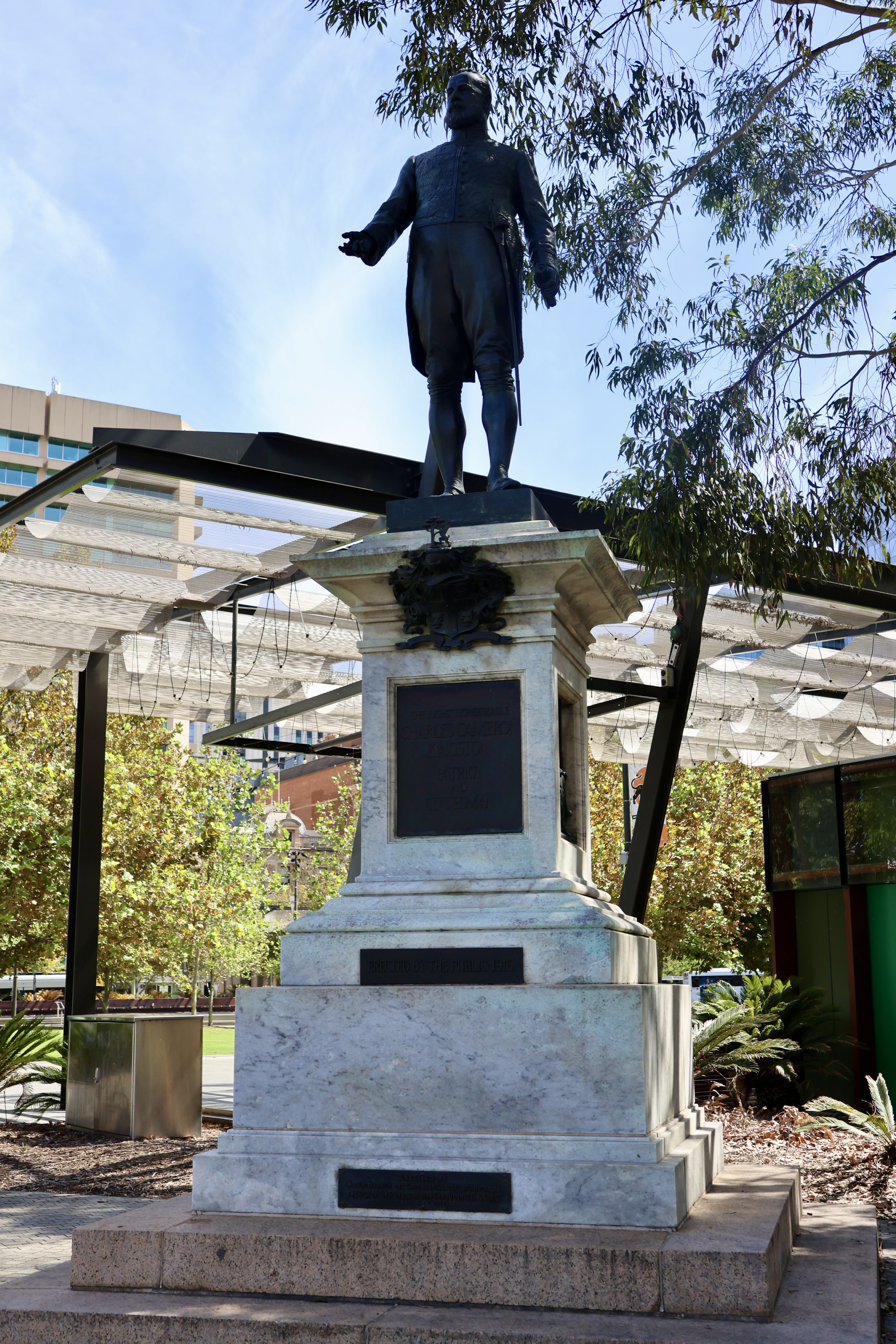
Statue of Kingston at Victoria Square in March 2025

A statue of Kingston stands in Victoria Square/Tarntanyangga, in the centre of Adelaide, with the plaque reading "patriot and statesman". After the Black Lives Matter gained pace in June 2020, with various statues representing slave traders and various perpetrators of racism being removed or defaced both in the US and in the UK during the George Floyd protests, archaeologist and historian Jacinta Koolmatrie pointed out what she saw as the irony of the statue being so close to the Aboriginal flag in the square, which was also the site of the Adelaide Black Lives Matter protest.

Political offices
Preceded by Sir John Downer	Premier of South Australia; 1893–1899	Succeeded by Vaiben Louis Solomon
New title	Minister for Trade and Customs; 1901–1903	Succeeded by William Lyne
Parliament of Australia
New division	Member for South Australia; 1901–1903; Served alongside: Batchelor, Bonython, Glynn, Holder, Poynton, Solomon	Division abolished
New division	Member for Adelaide; 1903–1908	Succeeded by Ernest Roberts
