= 1881 SAFA season =

5th season of Australian rules football competition

1881 SAFA premiership season
- Teams: 6
- Premiers: Norwood; 4th premiership
- Leading goalkicker: Joe Pollock; Norwood (7 Goals); W J Duffy; Norwood (7 Goals)
- Matches played: 34
- Highest: 1,500 (Round 2, Norwood vs. Port Adelaide)

The 1881 South Australian Football Association season was the 5th season of the top-level Australian rules football competition in South Australia. The premiership season began on Saturday 7 May.

Norwood went on to record its 4th consecutive premiership.

The years premiership trophy was called the Fowler Challenge Cup. Players were also presented with an individual Gold Medal engraved with their name and on the reverse side - S.A.F.A. Season 1881 The Fowler Champion Medal Won by Norwood.

== Adelaide and Kensington football clubs (merger and resignation from SAFA) ==
Adelaide and Kensington merged at a meeting held on 11 April 1881 to create full squads of a senior and second twenty and it was decided that the colour of the club be black-and scarlet guernsey, hose, and cap, and navy blue knickerbockers but resigned from the competition after four games.

It was then reported endeavours were being made to induce the North Adelaide Juniors and the North Parks to amalgamate and apply to the Association for permission to take up the fixtures of the Adelaide and Kensington Club. However, this didn't eventuate but the two clubs would merge and join as a new Adelaide SAFA senior team in 1885.

Old Adelaide Club disbanded but Kensington organised a number of matches against non-SAFA Clubs including North Park and Unley. On the Public Holiday Monday 8 August 1881, Kensington visited Mount Barker in the Adelaide Hills where the result was a draw - Kensington 1 goal 6 behinds to Mount Barker 1 goal 5 behinds.

In 1882, Kensington joined the Adelaide and Suburban Football Association and never rejoined the senior SAFA. Kensington would play four seasons (1882 to 1885) in the Adelaide and Suburban Football Association before resigning in April 1886 and dissolving.

== SAFA senior clubs 1881 season ==
Club	Colours	Home Ground	Captain	Comments
Adelaide-Kensington	Black Scarlet; Navy Blue	Old Adelaide Ground, North Adelaide; Kensington Oval, Kensington	H.S. Wyatt	Resigned from SAFA on 1 June 1881
Norwood	Dark blue Red	East Park Lands, Adelaide	A.E. Waldron	
Port Adelaide	Magenta	Alberton Oval, Alberton	J. Sandilands	
South Adelaide	Navy Blue White	South Terrace, Adelaide	T.Maloney / A.C. (Iney) Mehrtens	
South Park	Light Blue White	South Park Lands, Adelaide	P.G. McShane	
Victorian	Orange Black	Montefiore Hill, North Adelaide	G.E.Downs	

== Premiership season ==
=== Round 1 ===
	Round 1
Saturday, 7 May (3:12 pm)	Victorian 0.7 (0)	drew with	South Adelaide 0.5 (0)	Adelaide Oval
Saturday, 7 May (3:30 pm)	South Park 0.3 (0)	def. by	Norwood 2.7 (2)	South Park Lands (crowd: 550)
Saturday, 7 May (3:25 pm)	Port Adelaide 3.15 (3)	def.	Adelaide-Kensington 1.2 (1)	Alberton Oval (crowd: 200)
Captains : Norwood J.R.Osborne, South Park A.M.Pettinger

=== Round 2 ===
	Round 2
Saturday, 14 May (3:20 pm)	Victorian 3.21 (3)	def.	Adelaide-Kensington 0.0 (0)	Montefiore Hill
Saturday, 14 May (2:45 pm)	Norwood 4.6 (4)	def.	Port Adelaide 1.3 (1)	Adelaide Oval (crowd: 1,500)
Saturday, 14 May (3:00 pm)	South Park 0.6 (6)	def. by	South Adelaide 1.7 (1)	South Park Lands

=== Round 3 ===
	Round 3
Saturday, 21 May (3:15 pm)	Norwood 2.5 (2)	drew with	Victorian 2.3 (2)	Adelaide Oval (crowd: 1,500)
Saturday, 21 May (3:15 pm)	Port Adelaide 3.18 (3)	def.	South Park 1.2 (1)	Alberton Oval
Saturday, 21 May	Adelaide-Kensington 0.4 (0)	def. by	South Adelaide 4.8 (4)	Kensington Oval

=== Round 4 ===
	Round 4
Saturday, 28 May (3:30 pm)	Victorian 0.1 (0)	drew with	Port Adelaide 0.2 (0)	Adelaide Oval
Saturday, 28 May (3:30 pm)	South Adelaide 3.5 (3)	drew with	Norwood 3.11 (3)	South Park Lands
Saturday, 28 May	Adelaide-Kensington 0.1 (0)	def. by	South Park 7.14 (7)	Old Adelaide Ground
Adelaide-Kensington's game against South Park would be its last official game for the season as they resigned from the competition on the Wednesday 1 June.

=== Round 5 ===
	Round 5
Saturday, 4 June (3:15 pm)	Victorian 0.4 (0)	def. by	South Park 2.6 (2)	Adelaide Oval
Saturday, 4 June (3:30 pm)	Port Adelaide 0.6 (0)	drew with	South Adelaide 0.8 (0)	Alberton Oval
Norwood were scheduled to play Adelaide-Kensington, but Adelaide-Kensington resigned from the competition on 1 June; Norwood were awarded the match on forfeit, and played against a 25 team from Royal Park instead.

=== BYE ROUND ===
Saturday 11 June to 18 June 1880 were bye Rounds due to the SAFA hosting Carlton from Melbourne. A series of 4 matches were played against the local SAFA Clubs.

=== Round 6 ===
	Round 6
Saturday, 25 June	South Park 1.5 (1)	def. by	Norwood 4.6 (4)	Adelaide Oval
Saturday, 25 June	Victorian 1.9 (1)	def.	South Adelaide 0.0 (0)	North Park Lands, Foot of Montefiore Hill
Despite Adelaide-Kensington resigning from the SAFA a match was advertised for Port Adelaide to play against a team of 25 from Adelaide-Kensington. The game was played on the Queen and Albert Oval (Alberton Oval), Saturday, June 25, between the first twenty of the Ports (17) and a combined team of Adelaides-cum-Kensingtons (20). The game was not commenced till 3.40pm in consequence of each team having to take on some substitutes. The game throughout was played in a very friendly spirit. Result - Port Adelaide defeated Adelaide-Kensingtion 8 goals 25 behinds to Nil

=== Round 7 ===
	Round 7
Saturday, 2 July	South Adelaide 2.4 (2)	def. by	South Park 4.6 (4)	Adelaide Oval
Saturday, 2 July	Port Adelaide 1.11 (1)	drew with	Norwood 1.16 (1)	Alberton Oval
	Bye; Victorian

=== Round 8 ===
	Round 8
Saturday, 9 July (3:15 pm)	Victorian 0.2 (0)	def. by	Norwood 4.8 (4)	Adelaide Oval (crowd: 1,000)
Saturday, 9 July (3:00 pm)	South Park 3.9 (3)	def.	Port Adelaide 1.5 (1)	South Park Lands
	Bye; South Adelaide

=== Round 9 ===
	Round 9
Saturday, 16 July	Norwood 6.17 (6)	def.	South Adelaide 0.1 (0)	Adelaide Oval
Saturday, 16 July (3:25 pm)	Port Adelaide 0.11 (0)	def. by	Victorian 1.4 (1)	Alberton Oval

=== Round 10 ===
	Round 10
Saturday, 23 July (3:20 pm)	South Adelaide 5.19 (5)	def.	Port Adelaide 0.7 (0)	Adelaide Oval (crowd: 500)
Saturday, 23 July	South Park 3.10 (3)	def.	Victorian 0.6 (0)	South Park Lands

=== Round 11 ===
	Round 11
Saturday, 30 July (3:20 pm)	Norwood 3.6 (3)	def.	South Park 0.10 (0)	Adelaide Oval
Saturday, 30 July (3:30 pm)	South Adelaide 2.8 (2)	def.	Victorian 0.6 (0)	South Park Lands

=== Round 12 (Match Abandoned) ===
	Round 12
Saturday, 6 August	South Park 1.4	drew with	South Adelaide 1.4	South Park Lands
Game was abandoned following a dispute and the spectators rushing the ground. Match was replayed on Saturday, 24 September 1881.

=== Bye Round ===
A practice match for the SAFA Intercolonial Twenty was scheduled.
SATURDAY, AUGUST 13, 1881, on VIC'S GROUNDS, MONTEFIORE HILL.
INTERCOLONIAL TWENTY V. ASSOCIATION.

The following is the SAFA football team chosen to go to Melbourne on the 16th: —
J. Brophy, E. Cox, A. W. Docks, J.Creswell, M. Coffey, W. Dixon, A, Dick (vice-captain), A.Frayne, R. Hill, H. B. Lavis, T.Maloney, A.Mehrtens, P. G. McShane, J. Minney, H. Macnamara, A. Shawyer, J. Fidoli, D. C. Scott, R. Turpeny, J. Watt, A. E. Waldron (captain), R. Wardrop

The following have been chosen to play against them in the practice match, to be held on August 13, on the Victorians' ground:—
A. Shawyer, J. Minney, J. Traynor, W. Longdon, W. Hilditch, J. Fletcher, Ern. Le Messurier, C.Godfrey, W, Knill, T. Smith, J. E. Woods, W.Budgen, A. M. Pettinger, H. S. Wyatt (vice-captain), J. Sandilands (captain), B. Coonan, T.Blinman, G. Bragge, J. Pollock, A. Attridge; emergency—H. Ewer. W. Reed, J. Rees, J. Munro.

=== Round 13 ===
	Round 13
Saturday, 3 September	Port Adelaide 0	drew with	South Park 0	Alberton Oval
The newspaper reporter at the game was critical of the ground condition at Alberton Oval noting that areas had grass up to one foot high.

=== Round 14 ===
	Round 14
Saturday, 10 September	South Adelaide 0.6 (0)	def. by	Norwood 3.10 (3)	South Park Lands
Saturday, 10 September	Victorian 0	v	Port Adelaide 0	Montefiore Hill
The Victorian v Port Adelaide match was abandoned due to a crowd invasion and declared a draw. A disputed goal (due to the goal umpire not at his post) 20 minutes before time caused both teams to withdraw from the ground.

=== Round 15 ===
	Round 15
Saturday, 17 September (3:30 pm)	Victorian 0.5 (0)	drew with	South Park 0.10 (0)	Montefiore Hill
Saturday, 17 September	Port Adelaide 1	drew with	South Adelaide 1.4 (1)	Alberton Oval

=== Round 16 ===
	Round 16
Saturday, 24 September (3:00 pm)	Norwood 6.14 (6)	def.	Port Adelaide 0.0 (0)	East Park Lands
Saturday, 24 September	South Park 0.10 (0)	drew with	South Adelaide 0.8 (0)	South Park Lands
South Park vs. South Adelaide was rematch for the game abandoned on 6 August 1881.

=== Round 17 ===
	Round 17
Saturday, 1 October	Victorian 1.2 (1)	def. by	Norwood 2.9 (2)	Old Adelaide Ground (crowd: 500)

== Ladder ==
1881 SAFA Ladder
	TEAM	P	W	L	D	GF	GA
1	Norwood (P)	13	10	0	3	40	9
2	South Adelaide	13	4	4	5	19	18
3	South Park	13	5	5	3	21	17
4	Victorian	13	4	5	4	8	15
5	Port Adelaide	13	2	6	5	10	23
6	Adelaide - Kensington	5	0	5	0	1	17
Key: P = Played, W = Won, L = Lost, D = Drawn, GF = Goals For, GA = Goals Against, (P) = Premiers							

Note:

- South Adelaide played South Park three times for a 1-1-1 record; South Adelaide were ranked above South Park on a superior head-to-head record against Norwood (0-2-1 to 0-3).
- Adelaide-Kensington withdrew from the competition after Round 4; all published ladders record their Round 5 match against Norwood as a win for Norwood on forfeit. A table published on Saturday 2 July 1881 states - Adelaide & Kensington (resigned) and records 5 losses.

== Intercolonial matches ==
	1881 Intercolonial Matches
Saturday, 20 August	Victoria 8.24	def.	South Australia 1.8	East Melbourne Cricket Ground
Wednesday, 24 August	Victoria 4.14	def.	South Australia 1.5	East Melbourne Cricket Ground (crowd: 1,000)

== Additional matches ==
Members of the Carlton Football Club arrived at Port Adelaide wharf by the steamer Victorian on Thursday morning at 11.30am, 9 June 1881 after a very rough passage from Melbourne.

	SAFA Clubs vs Carlton (VFA)
Saturday, 11 June 2.42pm	South Park 2.8 (2)	def. by	Carlton 6.9 (6)	Adelaide Oval (crowd: 3000)
Wednesday, 15 June 2.50pm	Port Adelaide 0.3 (0)	def. by	Carlton 13.17 (13)	Adelaide Oval (crowd: (small))
Saturday, 18 June 3pm	Victorian 0.5 (0)	def. by	Carlton 3.12 (3)	Adelaide Oval (crowd: 3000)
Monday, 20 June 2.45pm	Norwood 1.5 (1)	def. by	Carlton 3.12 (3)	Adelaide Oval (crowd: 4000)
The Victorian vs Carlton match was briefly attended by Prince Albert Victor, Duke of Clarence and Avondale age 17 and Prince George of Wales age 16 (who would become King George V) who were both on a Royal tour in Australia.
