= 1884 SAFA season =

8th season of SAFA competition

1884 SAFA premiership season
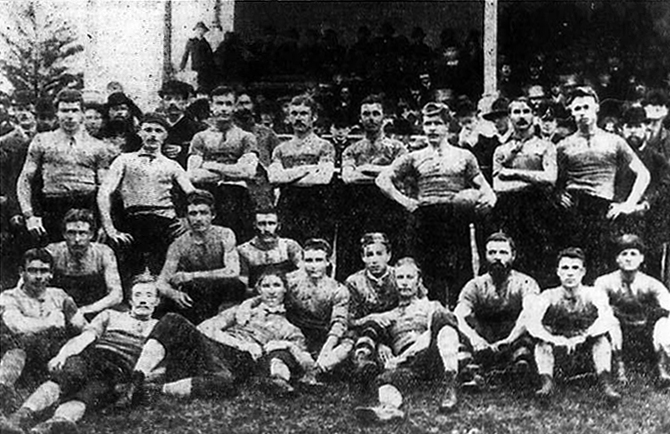
- The Port Adelaide premiership team
- Teams: 5
- Premiers: Port Adelaide; 1st premiership
- Leading goalkicker: Robert Roy; Port Adelaide (22 Goals)
- Matches played: 33
- Highest: 6,000 (Round 8, Norwood vs. Port Adelaide)

The 1884 South Australian Football Association season was the 8th season of the top-level Australian rules football competition in South Australia.

Port Adelaide went on to record its 1st premiership and in doing so ended Norwood's run of 6 straight premierships (1878-1883).

The season would be the last for two of the founding clubs - South Park Football Club and the North Adelaide Football Club, previously known as the Victorian Football Club. It shares no relation to the modern day North Adelaide Roosters.

Of the 8 original clubs from 1877 only Port Adelaide and South Adelaide, after 8 seasons, would compete in 1885.

At a committee meeting of the SAFA held on the 6 May 1884 the question of the amalgamation of the Senior and Junior Associations was then discussed at some length, and eventually it was agreed that five delegates from each Association should, confer as to what steps could be taken to effect the object in view.

== SAFA Senior Clubs 1884 Season ==
Club	Colours	Home Ground	Captain	Comments
North Adelaide	Orange Black		F.H.Wedd	Inaugural club Final Season
Norwood	Dark blue Red		A.E. Waldron	
Port Adelaide	Magneta Blue	Alberton Oval, Alberton	R.Turpenny	Blue bib added to Magneta guernsey
South Adelaide	Navy Blue White		A.C. (Iney) Mehrtens	
South Park	Light Blue White		A.M.Pettinger	Inaugural club Final Season

== Premiership season ==
=== Round 1 ===
	Round 1
Saturday, 3 May (3:25 pm)	Norwood 9.16 (9)	def.	South Park 2.6 (2)	Adelaide Oval
Saturday, 3 May (3:30 pm)	North Adelaide 2.3 (2)	def. by	South Adelaide 3.12 (3)	Kensington Oval

=== Round 2 ===
	Round 2
Saturday, 10 May (3:20 pm)	South Adelaide 4.9 (4)	def.	Norwood 3.5 (3)	Adelaide Oval
Saturday, 10 May (3:30 pm)	North Adelaide 0.3 (0)	def. by	Port Adelaide 3.12 (3)	Kensington Oval

=== Round 3 ===
	Round 3
Saturday, 17 May (3:00 pm)	Port Adelaide 2.10 (2)	def. by	Norwood 3.15 (3)	Alberton Oval
Saturday, 17 May (3:30 pm)	South Adelaide 8.9 (8)	def.	South Park 0.3 (0)	Adelaide Oval (crowd: 350)

=== Round 4 ===
	Round 4
Saturday, 24 May (3:30 pm)	Port Adelaide 4.5 (4)	drew with	South Adelaide 4.2 (4)	Alberton Oval (crowd: 900)
Saturday, 24 May (4:00 pm)	North Adelaide 1.5 (1)	drew with	South Park 1.6 (1)	Kensington Oval

=== Round 5 ===
	Round 5
Saturday, 31 May (3:30 pm)	South Park 2.3 (2)	def. by	Port Adelaide 3.14 (3)	Adelaide Oval
Saturday, 31 May (3:30 pm)	North Adelaide 1.1 (1)	def. by	South Adelaide 6.18 (6)	Kensington Oval

=== Round 6 ===
	Round 6
Saturday, 7 June (3:30 pm)	Norwood 3.20 (3)	def.	North Adelaide 0.5 (0)	Adelaide Oval
Saturday, 7 June (3:25 pm)	South Adelaide 5.11 (5)	def.	South Park 2.6 (2)	Kensington Oval

=== Round 7 ===
	Round 7
Saturday, 14 June (3:15 pm)	Norwood 6.15 (6)	def.	South Adelaide 3.11 (3)	Adelaide Oval
Saturday, 14 June	Port Adelaide 10.15 (10)	def.	North Adelaide 1.? (1)	Alberton Oval

=== Round 8 ===
	Round 8
Friday, 20 June (2:58 pm)	Norwood 3.3 (3)	drew with	Port Adelaide 3.17 (3)	Adelaide Oval (crowd: 6,000)

=== Round 9 ===
	Round 9
Saturday, 5 July (3:20 pm)	Norwood 6.16 (6)	def.	North Adelaide 0.6 (0)	Adelaide Oval
Saturday, 5 July	Port Adelaide 11.18 (11)	def.	South Park 1.4 (1)	Alberton Oval

=== Round 10 ===
	Round 10
Saturday, 26 July	South Adelaide 7.6 (7)	def. by	Port Adelaide 9.6 (9)	Adelaide Oval
Saturday, 26 July (3:20 pm)	Norwood 8.19 (8)	def.	South Park 0.5 (0)	Kensington Oval (crowd: 100)

=== Round 11 ===
	Round 11
Saturday, 2 August (3:20 pm)	Port Adelaide 8.11 (8)	def.	Norwood 3.10 (3)	Alberton Oval
Saturday, 2 August	South Adelaide 8.17 (8)	def.	North Adelaide 1.8 (1)	Adelaide Oval

=== Round 12 ===
	Round 12
Saturday, 9 August (3:15 pm)	South Adelaide 2.12 (2)	def. by	Norwood 3.9 (3)	Kensington Oval (crowd: 850)
Saturday, 9 August (3:50 pm)	Port Adelaide 4.13 (4)	def.	North Adelaide 0.2 (2)	Alberton Oval

=== Round 13 ===
	Round 13
Saturday, 30 August	Norwood 0.11 (0)	def. by	Port Adelaide 3.15 (3)	Adelaide Oval (crowd: 5,000)
Saturday, 30 August	South Adelaide 5.18 (5)	def.	South Park 3.2 (3)	Kensington Oval (crowd: 40)
This was the first time Port Adelaide beat Norwood twice in once season and in consecutive encounters.; A game was played between Norwood and South Adelaide on Monday 1 September which was a public holiday. The game did not count to the Association premiership. Norwood 2.6 defeated South Adelaide 1.6 Crowd 2000

=== Round 14 ===
	Round 14
Saturday, 6 September (3:00 pm)	South Park 3.10 (3)	def.	North Adelaide 0.6 (0)	Adelaide Oval (crowd: 300)
Saturday, 6 September (Time pm)	Port Adelaide 2.12 (2)	def.	South Adelaide 1.8 (1)	Alberton Oval (crowd: 1,000)

=== Round 15 ===
	Round 15
Saturday, 13 September	Norwood 2.10 (2)	def. by	North Adelaide 4.4 (4)	Kensington Oval
Saturday, 13 September	South Park 0.4 (4)	def. by	Port Adelaide 12.23 (12)	Adelaide Oval

=== Round 16 ===
	Round 16
Saturday, 20 September (Time pm)	South Adelaide 4.9 (4)	def.	Port Adelaide 1.4 (1)	Kensington Oval
South Park forfeited its scheduled game for the Saturday 20 September against Norwood at Adelaide Oval.

=== Round 17 ===
	Round 17
Saturday, 27 September (3:35 pm)	Norwood 7.7 (7)	def.	North Adelaide 1.7 (1)	Kensington Oval
South Park forfeited its game scheduled for the Saturday 27 September against Port Adelaide at Alberton Oval.

== Win/Loss table ==
+	Win	Qualified for finals
−	Loss	Eliminated

X – Bye
Opponent for round listed above margin

Team	1	2	3	4	5	6	7	8	9	10	11	12	13	14	15	16	17	Ladder
Port Adelaide	X	NthA; 3	Nor; 1	SthA; 0	SP; 1	X	NthA; 9	Nor; 0	SP; 10	SthA; 2	Nor; 5	NthA; 4	Nor; 3	SthA; 1	SP; 12	SthA; 3	SP; DNP	1
Norwood	SP; 7	SthA; 1	Port; 1	X	X	NthA; 3	SthA; 3	Port; 0	NthA; 6	SP; 8	Port; 5	SthA; 1	Port; 3	X	NthA; 2	SP; DNP	NthA; 6	2
South Adelaide	NthA; 1	Nor; 1	SP; 8	Port; 0	NthA; 5	SP; 3	Nor; 3	X	X	Port; 2	NthA; 8	Nor; 1	SP; 2	Port; 1	X	Port; 3	X	3
South Park	Nor; 7	X	SthA; 8	NthA; 0	Port; 1	SthA; 3	X	X	Port; 10	Nor; 8	X	X	SthA; 2	NthA; 3	Port; 12	Nor; DNP	Port; DNP	4
North Adelaide	SthA; 1	Port; 3	X	SP; 0	SthA; 5	Nor; 3	Port; 9	X	Nor; 6	X	SthA; 8	Port; 4	X	SP; 3	Nor; 2	X	Nor; 6	5
Team																		Ladder

== Ladder ==
1884 SAFA Ladder
	TEAM	P	W	L	D	GF	BF	GA	BA	Pts	Adj Pts
1	Port Adelaide (P)	15	11	2	2	73	173	29	74	24	24.00
2	Norwood	14	9	4	1	56	156	32	116	19	20.36
3	South Adelaide	13	8	4	1	60	138	37	73	17	19.62
4	South Park	12	1	10	1	14	47	62	139	3	3.75
5	North Adelaide	12	1	10	1	11	45	54	157	3	3.75
Key: P = Played, W = Won, L = Lost, D = Drawn, GF = Goals For, BF = Behinds For, GA = Goals Against, BA = Behinds Against, Pts = Points, Adj Pts = Points adjusted for match ratio, (P) = Premiers											

Note: Norwood were ranked ahead of South Adelaide on head-to-head record (2-1), and South Park were ranked ahead of North Adelaide on head-to-head record having played each other only twice for a 1-0-1 record.
The Victorian Football Club renamed itself North Adelaide at the beginning of the 1883 season but has no connection to the modern day North Adelaide Roosters.
Both South Park and North Adelaide (Victorian) Clubs resigned from the SAFA before the commencement of the 1885 Season.
