= Aldam =

Aldam is a surname and occasional given name. Notable people with this name include:

- Aldam Pettinger (1859–1950), Australian sportsman
- John Aldam Aizlewood (1895–1990), British army officer
- Julia Warde-Aldam (1857–1931), English estate owner
- William Aldam (1813–1890), English politician
