= 1882 SAFA season =

1882 SAFA premiership season
- Teams: 6
- Premiers: Norwood; 5th premiership
- Leading goalkicker: H J Wardrop; South Adelaide (14 Goals)
- Matches played: 32 (40 scheduled)
- Highest: 1,750 (Round 16, Norwood vs. South Adelaide)

The 1882 South Australian Football Association season was the 6th season of the top-level Australian rules football competition in South Australia. The 1882 SAFA season was the first time that the league used behinds in determining game results.

The season began on Saturday 6 May with 6 teams. A junior team the Royal Park Football Club entered the competition as a replacement for Adelaide/Kensington Club which withdrew the previous season after 4 games.

Norwood went on to record its 5th consecutive premiership.

Royal Park folded after five matches, their remaining five scheduled matches were declared forfeits, and collected the wooden spoon.

== SAFA Senior Clubs 1882 Season ==
Club	Colours	Home Ground	Captain	Comments
Norwood	Dark blue Red	East Park Lands, Adelaide	A.E. Waldron	
Port Adelaide	Magenta	Alberton Oval, Alberton	Nathaniel Frayne / Charles Kellett	
Royal Park	Blue White orange hoop	Adelaide Oval		Folded on 15 July 1882
South Adelaide	Navy Blue White	South Terrace, Adelaide	Iney Mehrtens	
South Park	Light Blue White	South Park Lands, Adelaide	H.Dick	
Victorian	Orange Black	Montefiore Hill, North Adelaide		

== Premiership season ==
=== Round 1 ===
	Round 1
Saturday, 6 May	Norwood 5.26 (5)	def.	Royal Park 0.2 (0)	Adelaide Oval
Saturday, 6 May (3:30 pm)	South Adelaide 4.8 (4)	def.	South Park 2.0 (2)	Kensington Oval
Saturday, 6 May (3:30 pm)	Port Adelaide 0.7 (0)	def. by	Victorian 2.3 (2)	Alberton Oval (crowd: 500)

=== Round 2 ===
	Round 2
Saturday, 13 May	Norwood 3.5 (3)	def.	South Park 1.9 (1)	Kensington Oval
Saturday, 13 May	South Adelaide 3.3 (3)	def.	Port Adelaide 1.8 (1)	Adelaide Oval
Saturday, 13 May (3:30 pm)	Victorian 3.9 (3)	def.	Royal Park 1.3 (1)	Alberton Oval

=== Round 3 ===
	Round 3
Saturday, 20 May (3:30 pm)	Victorian 5.4 (5)	def.	South Park 1.11 (1)	Adelaide Oval
Saturday, 20 May (3:25 pm)	Norwood 1.10 (1)	def.	South Adelaide 0.3 (0)	Kensington Oval
Saturday, 20 May (3:25 pm)	Port Adelaide 6.20 (6)	def.	Royal Park 1.1 (1)	Alberton Oval
Royal Park lost their match against Port Adelaide 1.1 to 6.20 after kicking with the wind they led at half time 1 goal 1 behind to Ports 7 behinds

=== Round 4 ===
	Round 4
Saturday, 27 May (3:10 pm)	Norwood 1.16	def.	Port Adelaide 2.11	Adelaide Oval
Saturday, 27 May	Victorian 1.2 (1)	drew with	South Adelaide 1.3 (1)	Kensington Oval
Port Adelaide defeated Norwood for the first time after 9 attempts but the game ended in controversy over a disputed goal.; At the SAFA meeting on 30 May a decision was made to replay the match, however Port Adelaide declined to accede to this decision and Norwood was awarded the match on forfeit.; Royal Park forfeited their match against South Park scheduled for the Alberton Oval.

=== Round 5 ===
	Round 5
Saturday, 3 June (3:00 pm)	Norwood 4.5 (4)	def.	Victorian 0.8 (0)	Kensington Oval
Saturday, 3 June (3:30 pm)	Port Adelaide 1.4 (1)	def.	South Park 0.2 (0)	Alberton Oval
Saturday, 3 June (Time pm)	South Adelaide 3.15 (3)	def.	Royal Park 0.0 (0)	Adelaide Oval
It was reported on 10th June - The South Adelaides beat the Royal Parks very easily by 3 goals to nil, but as the resignation of the latter Club had been accepted the Association will not recognise the match. South Parks have secured the services of four of the best men in the Royal Parks, and their presence should strengthen the plucky Parks in no small degree.

=== Round 6 ===
	Round 6
Saturday, 10 June	Victorian 0.9 (0)	def. by	Port Adelaide 4.9 (4)	Adelaide Oval
Saturday, 10 June (3:30 pm)	South Adelaide 3.9 (3)	def.	South Park 0.2 (0)	Kensington Oval

=== Round 7 ===
	Round 7
Saturday, 1 July	Port Adelaide 2.6 (2)	def.	South Adelaide 1.4 (1)	Alberton Oval
Saturday, 1 July	Royal Park 0.0 (0)	def. by	Victorian 7.7 (7)	Kensington Oval

=== Round 8 ===
	Round 8
Saturday, 8 July	Norwood 1.3 (1)	def. by	South Adelaide 2.7 (2)	Adelaide Oval
Saturday, 8 July (3:40 pm)	Victorian 1.5 (1)	drew with	South Park 1.3 (1)	Kensington Oval

=== Round 9 ===
	Round 9
Saturday, 15 July (3:30 pm)	Port Adelaide 0.2 (0)	def. by	Norwood 3.17 (3)	Alberton Oval
Saturday, 15 July	South Adelaide 6.16 (6)	def.	Victorian 1.4 (1)	Adelaide Oval
The Royal Parks have at length retired, and their remaining matches of the second round will count as wins to their opponents.

=== Round 10 ===
	Round 10
Saturday, 22 July	Victorian 2.1 (2)	def. by	Norwood 3.15 (3)	Adelaide Oval
Saturday, 22 July (3:30 pm)	South Park 0.6 (0)	def. by	Port Adelaide 2.7 (2)	Kensington Oval

=== Round 11 ===
	Round 11
Saturday, 29 July	South Adelaide 3.5 (3)	def.	South Park 2.4 (2)	Adelaide Oval
Saturday, 29 July (3:30 pm)	Victorian 1.6 (1)	def. by	Port Adelaide 4.10 (4)	Kensington Oval

=== Round 12 ===
	Round 12
Saturday, 5 August (3:30 pm)	Norwood 4.7 (1)	def.	South Park 1.7 (1)	Adelaide Oval
Saturday, 5 August	South Adelaide 4.12 (4)	def.	Victorian 0.6 (0)	Kensington Oval

=== Round 13 ===
	Round 13
Monday, 7 August (3:00 pm)	Norwood 3.14 (3)	def.	South Adelaide 2.4 (2)	Adelaide Oval (crowd: 1,500)

=== Round 14 ===
	Round 14
Saturday, 12 August	South Adelaide 2.4 (2)	def. by	Port Adelaide 3.5 (3)	Adelaide Oval (crowd: 1,000)
Saturday, 12 August (3:30 pm)	Victorian 0.3 (0)	def. by	South Park 2.12 (2)	Kensington Oval

=== Round 15 ===
Round 15
The game scheduled for Saturday 19 August at Kensington Oval between Norwood and Port Adelaide was awarded to Norwood on forfeit as Port Adelaide objected to the match not being played at Alberton Oval and refused to travel.

=== Round 16 ===
	Round 16
Saturday, 26 August (3:30 pm)	Norwood 3.15 (3)	def.	South Adelaide 2.5 (2)	Kensington Oval (crowd: 1,750)

=== Round 17 ===
	Round 17
Saturday, 2 September (3:30 pm)	Norwood 4.18 (4)	def.	Victorian 1.5 (1)	Kensington Oval

=== Round 18 ===
	Round 18
Saturday, 9 September (3:30 pm)	Norwood 9.14 (9)	def.	South Park 4.4 (4)	Kensington Oval

== Ladder ==
1882 SAFA Ladder
	TEAM	P	W	L	D	GF	BF	GA	BA
1	Norwood (P)	14	13	1	0	40	149	13	52
2	South Adelaide	14	10	3	1	35	97	16	65
3	Port Adelaide	14	7	7	0	22	78	14	56
4	Victorian	14	4	8	2	24	68	34	127
5	South Park	14	4	9	1	13	63	35	76
6	Royal Park	10	0	10	0	2	6	24	85
Key: P = Played, W = Won, L = Lost, D = Drawn, PF = Points For, PA = Points Against,									

Note: Royal Park only played five matches (of which 2 were against Victorians), forfeiting one against South Park, whilst the others were declared forfeits after the club dropped out of the SAFA and folded.
Each club played every other 3 times, except Royal Park which was only 2 (including the forfeits).
