= Royal Park Football Club =

Names
- Full name: Royal Park Football Club

Club details
- Founded: 24 March 1880
- Dissolved: 15 July 1882
- Colours: Blue White orange hoop (added 1882)
- Competition: South Australian Football Association 1882
- Ground: Adelaide Oval

Royal Park Football Club was an Australian rules football based in Adelaide, South Australia that competed in the South Australian Football Association (SAFA) in 1882. Royal Park only played five matches in the 1882 SAFA season before folding, with another five matches being recorded as forfeits.

== Football Club Formation (1880) ==
The Football Club was founded at a meeting held at the Brecknock Hotel, King William Street (corner Gilbert Street), Adelaide on Wednesday the 24 March 1880. With Mr. W. Baker in the chair the following officers were elected:— President, Mr. W. W. Winwood; vice-presidents, Messrs. C. C. Kingston, Dr. Joyce, T. Charlton, Councillors J. Baker, and W. Holland; captain, W. Giffen; vice-captain, A. Brandenburg; secretary, J. Lyons; treasurer, G. Martin; Committee, T. Rowe, F. Mehrtens, W. Baker, A. D. Munro; match, committee, W. Giffen, F. Mehrtens, W.Baker, and the secretary and treasurer. Several prominent players were elected.

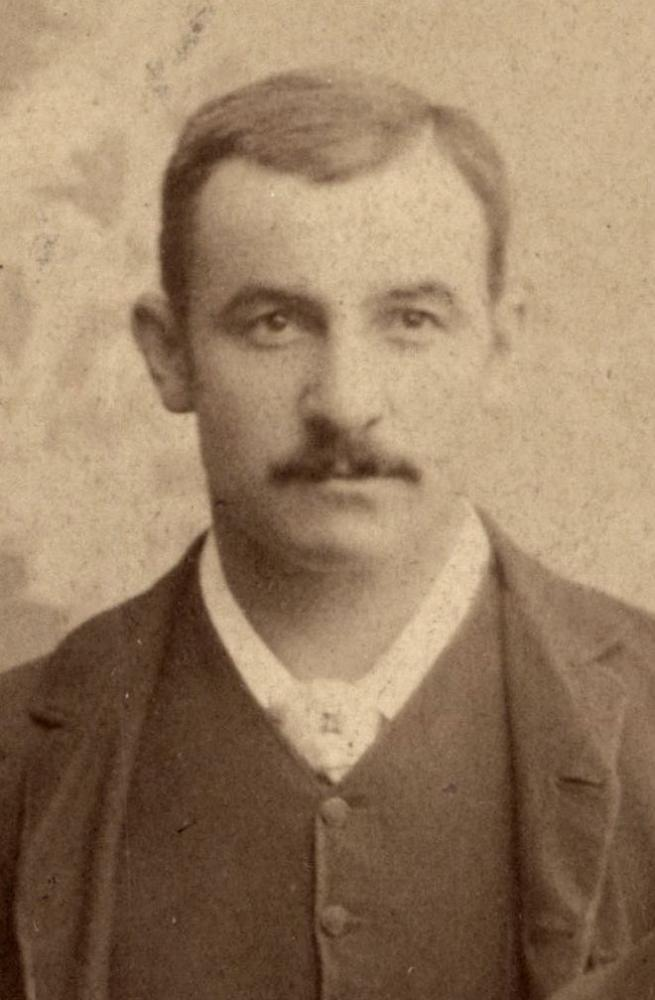
Walter Giffen, future State and Test Cricketer, was captain of Royal Park Football Club in 1880. He also played cricket for Royal Park

== Annual Meeting (1880) ==
A meeting of the members of the Royal Park Football Club was held at the King's Head Hotel on Wednesday evening, September 22, 1880. There was a large attendance. Mr. W. H. J. Dedman occupied the chair. It was stated that the club had been very successful during the past year. Fifteen matches had been played, six were won, four lost, and five ware drawn. The advisableness of forming a junior association was discussed, and it was decided to, take active steps in the matter. Several toasts were proposed, including that of the captain, vice-captain, and chairman.

== General Meeting (1881) ==
A general meeting of the Royal Park Football Club was held at the King's Head Hotel on Wednesday evening, March 30, 1881. The secretary report showed the expenses, leaving a balance of £3 lls. Id. The club had played 20 matches, won 8, lost 4, and drawn 8. The following officers were elected:— Patron. Hon.G. S. Fowler; president, Mr.C.C. Kingston; vice-presidents, Messrs. A.J.Diamond, W Killicoat, Councillor Holland, L. Mehrtens, Dr. Gardner, W. Charlton, W. W. Crane; secretary Mr. Lyons; treasurer Mr. J. Rowe. Several new members were elected. The appointments of captains of both twenties was left until after the color match, which is to be played early April.

== Admission to SAFA (1882) ==
A special meeting of the club was held at the Brecknock Hotel on Wednesday evening 29 March 1882, Mr.Maley in the chair. The secretary stated that he had received a letter from one of the prominent members and various other gentlemen advising the club to go into the Senior Association. Mr. J. McLoughlin proposed, and Mr. A. G. Hill seconded — That the club accede to the wishes of these gentlemen, as there was no other course for the club to pursue, as they were not in the Junior Association.

It was decided that the club should wear the old colours with an orange hoop; also that they should go into the Senior Association with twenty-five players. The secretary was instructed to write, applying for the vacant position.

On 4 April 1882 the South Australian Football Association held a meeting after inviting additional clubs to join the competition. Only one application was received, from the Royal Park Football Club, and the association agreed to include them in the competition for the upcoming 1882 SAFA season with 19 votes for to 4 votes against.

On 6 May 1882, a Royal Park team of 23 played their first SAFA games was against Norwood Football Club on Adelaide Oval.
Saturday, 6 May Norwood Football Club 5.26 (5) defeated Royal Park 0.2 (0) at Adelaide Oval

It was reported on Saturday 3 June 1882 - At the meeting of the South Australia Football Association a letter was received from the secretary of the Royal Park Club tendering the resignation of the club. The resignation was accepted. At the same meeting a communication was received from one of the members of the club, stating that the club did not wish to resign. This as a matter of course was not entertained by the association. The Royal Park Club held a meeting on Friday evening, at which it was decided that the club had no wish to resign. The resignation of the club having been accepted a special meeting of the association must be called to reinstate the club.

On Saturday 10 June 1882 it was reported - The South Adelaides did just what they liked with the Royal Parks on the Adelaide Oval on Saturday afternoon last, June 3. The game was played under the auspices of the Football Association, the Royal Park Club having been reinstated.

On Saturday 17 June 1882 it was reported - The Royal Parks failed to get a team together against the Norwoods, and it is to be hoped that they will now make up their minds to resign all further connection with the association.

On Saturday 1 July 1882 it was reported - Royal Parks vs. Victorians. This match was played on the Kensington Oval on Saturday afternoon, in the presence of a very small number of spectators. The afternoon was beautifully fine for the game, but the football displayed by the Royal Parks was miserable. The Parks were never in the game, and it seems a pity that the club should have contested an association match. The Victorian's kicked 7 goals and 7 behinds. And also - The match on the Kensington Oval between the Victorians and the Royal Parks was a sickening spectacle. The juniors were never in the game, and to put them forward as an association club is a bitter 'reflection on our association football. If one can imagine a lot of rough lads, ranging from the age of 10 to 14, having a very rough game of football among themselves, without any pretensions to discipline or knowledge of the game, then he has a very fair idea of the football displayed by the Royal Parks. For the interest of association football generally the sooner they retire from the association the quicker will the blot which now rests on the Football Association be removed.

On Saturday 15 July 1882 it was reported -The Royal Parks have at length retired, and their remaining matches of the second round will count as wins to their opponents. The end of season table recorded their results as - Played 5 games (Victorian twice and one each against Norwood, Port Adelaide and South Adelaide) and 5 forfeits (South Park twice and one each against Norwood, Port Adelaide and South Adelaide). The team kicked just 2 goals (one each by Lyons and Macklow) and 6 behinds in their five SAFA games and conceded 24 goals 85 behinds. The club prominent members were welcomed to join the South Park.

In 1883, it was reported that a number of their players had joined the West Torrens Club which would rename itself in 1887 as West Adelaide when it joined the SAFA. The failure of the Royal Parks has considerably strengthened their ranks, Blacklow, Loud, and others having decided to throw in their lot with the red, white, and blue.

== Royal Park Cricket Club ==
Despite the Football Club folding in 1882, the cricket club continued for a number of seasons before amalgamating with the Hackney Cricket Club in September 1889.

== Notable players ==
John James (Jack) LYONS - also played one season at Norwood Football Club in 1885 played cricket for Royal Park as a youth, then Norwood, South Australia and was an Australian cricketer who played in 14 Test matches between 1887 and 1897.

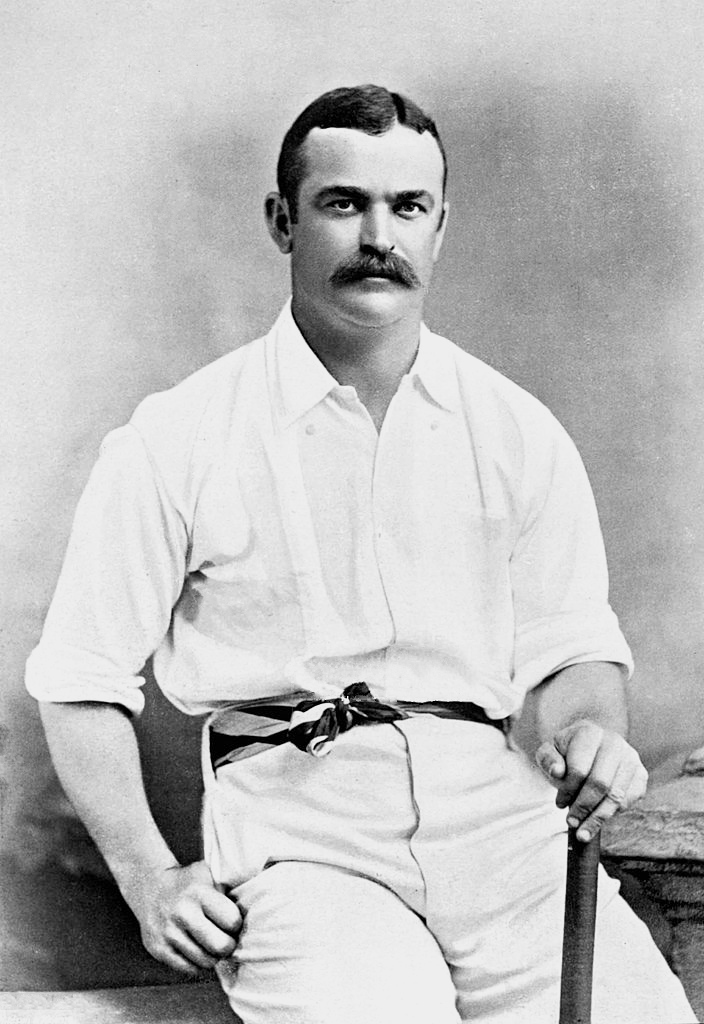
J.J. (Jack) Lyons, future State and Test Cricketer, kicked one of the only two goals scored by Royal Park
