= 1883 SAFA season =

1883 SAFA premiership season
- Teams: 5
- Premiers: Norwood; 6th premiership
- Leading goalkicker: James Litchfield; Port Adelaide (13 Goals)
- Matches played: 38
- Highest: 1,000 (Round 2, Port Adelaide vs. Norwood)

The 1883 South Australian Football Association season was the 7th season of the top-level Australian rules football competition in South Australia.

Norwood went on to record its 6th consecutive premiership.

The Victorian Football Club at its Annual General Meeting held on Friday 16 March 1883 at Scotch Thistle Hotel, North Adelaide, with 40 members present, resolved to change its name to North Adelaide Football Club. This club has no connection to the modern day SANFL North Adelaide Roosters.

== Programme and Ovals ==
At the annual meeting of the association an important motion was carried, the effect of which will be that the clubs will in future be allowed to fix their own matches. By this arrangement the contending clubs will share the proceeds of the gate, and thus the better teams will be the principal gainers. Efforts are being made to secure the Adelaide and Kensington ovals, which if successful will, it is thought, result in the association paying the clubs 50 per cent, and retaining the other 50. The money derived from the gate on the Alberton Oval will be divided, the competing clubs receiving one-third each, and the trustees of the ground the remainder.

== SAFA Senior Clubs 1883 Season ==
Club	Colours	Home Ground	Captain	Comments
North Adelaide	Orange Black		C. Warren	Victorian Club renamed to North Adelaide
Norwood	Dark blue Red	Kensington Oval, Kensington	A.E. Waldron	
Port Adelaide	Magneta	Alberton Oval, Alberton	E. Le Messurier / R.Turpenny	
South Adelaide	Navy Blue White			
South Park	Light Blue White	South Park Lands, Adelaide		

== Preseason ==
The football season opened on Saturday 14 April 1883.

Senior SAFA clubs played a series of matches against clubs from the Adelaide and Suburban Association on 23 April.

== Premiership season ==
=== Round 1 ===
	Round 1
Saturday, 5 May (3:20 pm)	Norwood 3.18 (3)	def.	North Adelaide 0.2 (0)	Adelaide Oval
Saturday, 5 May (3:15 pm)	South Adelaide 3.9 (3)	def.	Port Adelaide 2.7 (2)	Kensington Oval
	Bye; South Park

=== Round 2 ===
	Round 2
Saturday, 12 May	Port Adelaide 1.7 (1)	def. by	Norwood 4.9 (4)	Alberton Oval (crowd: 1,000)
Saturday, 12 May (3:25 pm)	South Park 0.8 (0)	def. by	South Adelaide 3.5 (3)	Kensington Oval
	Bye; North Adelaide

=== Round 3 ===
	Round 3
Saturday, 19 May	South Adelaide 0.7 (0)	drew with	North Adelaide 0.4 (0)	Adelaide Oval
Saturday, 19 May (3:15 pm)	South Park 1.12 (1)	def. by	Port Adelaide 3.6 (3)	Kensington Oval
	Bye; Norwood

=== Round 4 ===
	Round 4
Saturday, 26 May (3:15 pm)	South Park 2.8 (2)	def.	Norwood 1.7 (1)	Adelaide Oval
Saturday, 26 May (3:30 pm)	North Adelaide 0.3 (0)	def. by	Port Adelaide 3.4 (3)	Kensington Oval
	Bye; South Adelaide

=== Round 5 ===
	Round 5
Saturday, 2 June (3:20 pm)	South Park 0.3 (0)	def. by	North Adelaide 1.8 (1)	Adelaide Oval
Saturday, 2 June (3:30 pm)	Norwood 3.11 (3)	def.	South Adelaide 0.2 (0)	Kensington Oval
	Bye; Port Adelaide

=== Round 6 ===
	Round 6
Saturday, 9 June (3:10 pm)	Norwood 4.11 (4)	def.	North Adelaide 1.4 (1)	Adelaide Oval
Saturday, 9 June (3:30 pm)	Port Adelaide 2.6 (2)	def.	South Adelaide 0.9 (0)	Alberton Oval
	Bye; South Park

=== BYE ROUND ===
Intercolonial Match - Saturday, 16 June 1883.
Essendon 2-18 defeated Port Adelaide 1-4 at Kensington Oval. Crowd 5000.
Intercolonial Match - Wednesday, 20 June 1883. (Public Holiday)
Essendon 7-27 defeated South Adelaide 1-4 at Kensington Oval. Crowd 7000.
Silver Medals presented to best all round player from each team.
Mr Rout from Essendon and Mr. J. Bissett of the South Adelaide.
Intercolonial Match - Saturday, 23 June 1883.
Norwood 5-5 defeated Essendon 1-7 at Kensington Oval.

=== Round 7 ===
	Round 7
Saturday, 30 June (3:30 pm)	South Park 0.5 (0)	def. by	South Adelaide 3.6 (3)	Adelaide Oval (crowd: 400)
Saturday, 30 June (Time pm)	Norwood 4.8 (4)	def.	North Adelaide 2.5 (2)	Kensington Oval
	Bye; Port Adelaide
Port Adelaide would miss the next three rounds due to a football tour of Victoria.

=== Round 8 ===
	Round 8
Saturday, 7 July (3:00 pm)	Norwood 3.4 (3)	def.	South Adelaide 1.10 (1)	Adelaide Oval
Saturday, 7 July	South Park 5.11 (5)	def.	North Adelaide 0.4 (0)	Kensington Oval
	Bye; Port Adelaide

=== Round 9 ===
	Round 9
Saturday, 14 July (3:30 pm)	Norwood 2.16 (2)	def. by	South Park 3.6 (3)	Kensington Oval
Saturday, 14 July	North Adelaide 1.1 (1)	def. by	South Adelaide 2.17 (2)	Adelaide Oval (crowd: 700)
	Bye; Port Adelaide

=== Round 10 ===
	Round 10
Saturday, 21 July (3:15 pm)	Norwood 1.10 (1)	def. by	Port Adelaide 5.7 (5)	Adelaide Oval
Saturday, 21 July	South Park 3.5 (3)	def.	South Adelaide 1.8 (1)	Kensington Oval
	Bye; North Adelaide

=== Round 11 ===
	Round 11
Saturday, 28 July	South Park 1.6 (1)	def. by	Port Adelaide 3.8 (3)	Adelaide Oval
Saturday, 28 July (3:30 pm)	South Adelaide 5.12 (5)	def.	North Adelaide 3.4 (3)	Old Adelaide Ground
	Bye; Norwood

=== Round 12 ===
	Round 12
Saturday, 4 August	Norwood 5.17 (5)	def.	South Park 0.2 (0)	Adelaide Oval
Saturday, 4 August (3:45 pm)	Port Adelaide 3.12 (3)	def.	North Adelaide 0.3 (0)	Alberton Oval
	Bye; South Adelaide

=== Round 13 ===
	Round 13
Saturday, 11 August	South Adelaide 2.9 (2)	drew with	Norwood 2.5 (2)	Adelaide Oval
	Bye; Port Adelaide, South Park, North Adelaide

=== Round 14 ===
	Round 14
Saturday, 18 August (3:30 pm)	Norwood 3.27 (3)	def.	North Adelaide 1.2 (1)	Kensington Oval
Saturday, 18 August (3:30 pm)	South Adelaide 1.7 (1)	drew with	Port Adelaide 1.6 (1)	Adelaide Oval
	Bye; South Park

=== Round 15 ===
	Round 15
Saturday, 25 August (3:30 pm)	Port Adelaide 3.12 (3)	def. by	Norwood 6.17 (6)	Alberton Oval
Saturday, 25 August	South Adelaide 3.7 (3)	def. by	South Park 4.9 (4)	Adelaide Oval
	Bye; North Adelaide

=== Round 16 ===
	Round 16
Saturday, 1 September (3:15 pm)	Port Adelaide 3.12 (3)	def.	South Park 2.13 (2)	Alberton Oval
Saturday, 1 September (3:35 pm)	North Adelaide 5.8 (5)	def.	South Adelaide 3.7 (3)	Kensington Oval
	Bye; Norwood

=== Round 17 ===
	Round 17
Saturday, 8 September	Port Adelaide 3.13 (3)	drew with	North Adelaide 3.12 (3)	Alberton Oval (crowd: 500)
Saturday, 8 September (3:25 pm)	Norwood 4.13 (4)	def.	South Park 2.10 (2)	Kensington Oval
	Bye; South Adelaide

=== Round 18 ===
	Round 18
Saturday, 15 September (3:30 pm)	South Park 5.11 (5)	def.	North Adelaide 1.5 (1)	South Park Lands
Saturday, 15 September	Norwood 9.6 (9)	def.	South Adelaide 1.6 (1)	Kensington Oval
	Bye; Port Adelaide

=== Round 19 ===
	Round 19
Saturday, 22 September	Norwood 5.22 (5)	def.	Port Adelaide 1.7 (1)	Kensington Oval
Saturday, 22 September	South Park 3.9 (3)	def.	North Adelaide 0.3 (0)	Old Adelaide Ground (crowd: 200)
	Bye; South Adelaide

=== Round 20 ===
	Round 20
Saturday, 29 September (3:30 pm)	Port Adelaide 0.11 (0)	def. by	South Adelaide 2.10 (2)	Alberton Oval
	Bye; North Adelaide, Norwood, South Park

== Ladder ==
1883 SAFA Ladder
	TEAM	P	W	L	D	GF	BF	GA	BA	Pts	Adj Pts
1	Norwood (P)	16	12	3	1	59	192	25	89	25	25.00
2	Port Adelaide	14	7	5	2	33	122	29	140	16	18.29
3	South Park	15	7	8	0	31	126	33	118	14	14.93
4	South Adelaide	16	6	7	3	30	113	38	102	15	15.00
5	North Adelaide	15	2	11	2	18	63	46	175	6	6.40
Key: P = Played, W = Won, L = Lost, D = Drawn, GF = Goals For, GA = Goals Against, Pts = Points, Adj Pts = Points adjusted for match ratio, (P) = Premiers											

Note: Each team played every other team 4 times except Port Adelaide due to an interstate trip didn't play South Park and North Adelaide in one match each.
South Park were ranked above South Adelaide on head-to-head record (2-1).
The Victorian Football Club renamed itself North Adelaide at the beginning of the season but has no connection to the modern day North Adelaide Roosters.
