= South Park Football Club (SAFA) =

Names
- Full name: South Park Football Club

Club details
- Founded: 10 April 1877
- Dissolved: 18 March 1885
- Colours: White; Trimmed with Light Blue
- Competition: South Australian Football Association 1877-1884
- Ground: South Parklands, Adelaide

Uniforms
Home

The South Park Football Club was a foundation club of the South Australian Football Association (later renamed the SANFL) which competed in the inaugural 1877 SAFA season. The club was based in Adelaide city centre and played its home games on the Adelaide South Parklands near an area called the Butts (Rifle Range - now Veale Park / Waylu Yarta Park 21). The club uniform was white trousers, white jersey trimmed with blue and a white cap.

== Football club formation (1877) ==
The football club was formed following a meeting called by the secretary of South Park Cricket Club at the Prince Albert Hotel, Wright Street, Adelaide on Tuesday 10 April 1877.

== South Australian Football Association member (1877–1885) ==
South Park's captain for the 1877 season was Mr. J. H. Sinclair.

Team members for the 1879 season included John Creswell (Secretary), Aldam Murr Pettinger (Captain), Morton Beach Ive (Vice-Captain), E. Cotching, A. Clarke, F. Dobbs, E.B. Colton, A.H. Dick, C. Hall, James Thornhill Darwent, G.E. Durant, John James Palmer, R. Binney, Jack Hall, J.V. Smith, D. Harrold, William James Dishley, C. Godfrey, Harry Ewer, Fred Stacey, A. Wilson, Joseph Robert George Adams, William Rousenvell and F. Taylor. They had a total of 104 members. Part of their uniform included a striped hat and tall lace up boots.

1880 Season - Patron Mr James Hamilton Parr, President Superintendent Peterswald, Messrs. W. B. Rounsevell, M.P., W.K.Simms, M.P. and W. Sketheway, vice-presidents.

1881 - The club which strength is considerably augmented by the inclusion of the cream of the late Adelaide-and-Kensington Club played a game against the Carlton Football Club

The club played a game against the Victorian Football Association (VFA) Champions Geelong Football Club in the 1884 Season, losing 2 goals 6 behinds to 7 goals 12 behinds.

At the end of the 1884 season which had seen it finish fourth (out of five) and with just one win and one draw from 12 games equal with North Adelaide (1877–1884) formerly known as Victorian, South Park only avoided the wooden spoon by the number of goals scored. The club forfeited its final two games of the season, against Port Adelaide and Norwood.

== Resignation from SAFA and disbandment (1885) ==
Following the Annual General Meeting held at Hamburg Hotel on Wednesday 18 March 1885 in which the last minutes were read and confirmed and the balance sheet reported showing a small deficit a motion was passed to resign from the SAFA and disband. It was reported that great regret was expressed by members present, a vote of thanks in recognition of the efforts for the officers was taken and it was decided by those present to give their support for the newly amalgamated Adelaiders.

The new senior Adelaide, was formed in 1885 from the best players North Adelaide Junior and North Park these two junior clubs having merged. The most notable of the South Park players to join the new Adelaide Club was the Captain Aldam Murr Pettinger who became Vice-Captain of the new Adelaide Club. After finishing wooden spooners in 1885 they won the 1886 premiership.

== SAFA 1877-1884 Ladder Positions ==
Season	Position	Games	Wins	Losses	Draws	GF	GA	Captain	Top Goal Kicker
1877	6th	17	5	10	2	16	23	J. H. Sinclair	
1878	6th	12	1	7	4	2	14		
1879	5th	12	3	5	4	8	11		
1880	4th	12	5	7	0	13	14		
1881	3rd	13	5	5	3	21	17	P. G. McShane	
1882	5th	14	4	9	1	13–63	35–76	H. Dick	
1883	3rd	15	7	8	0	31–126	33–118		
1884	4th	12	1	10	1	14–47	62–139	A.M.Pettinger	

== Notable players ==
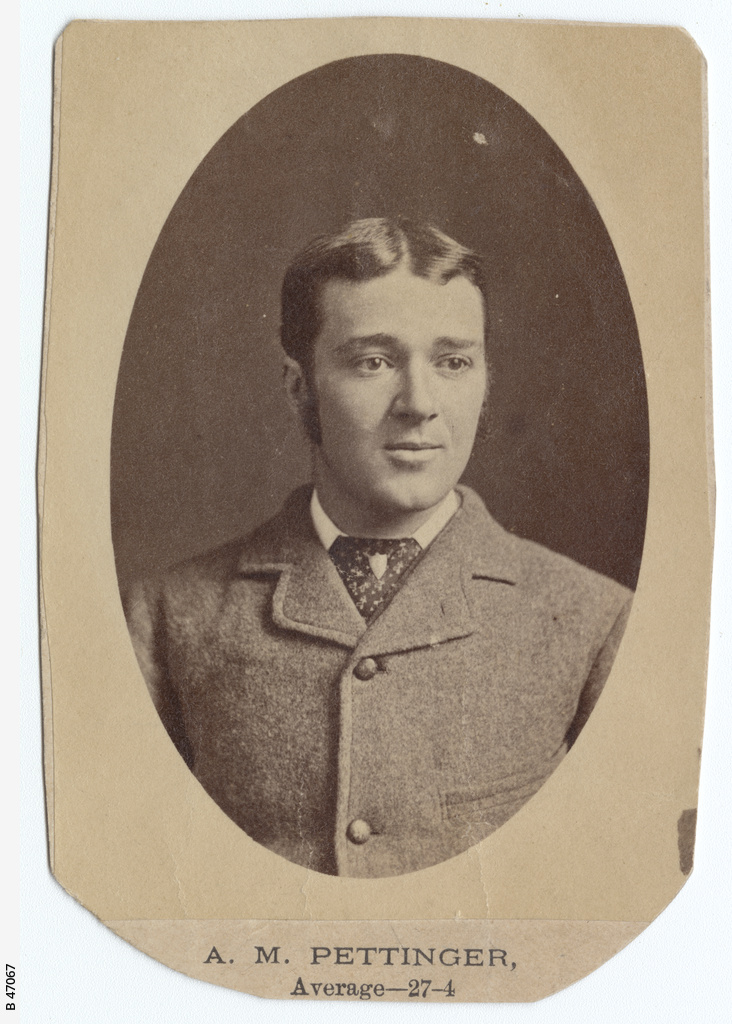
Aldam Murr "Pet" Pettinger

Aldam Murr "Pet" Pettinger - Who played for a total of 12 seasons in the SAFA, South Park 1877–84 and Adelaide 1885–88, became the first SAFA player to reach the 100 game milestone. Pettinger represented South Australia in cricket, Australian rules football, baseball and bowls, was a leading local lacrosse player, golfer, steeplechase rider, an excellent gun shot, and bred and trained hunting dogs. On his death in 1950, Pettinger was referred to as "the grand old man of South Australian sport".

Patrick George McShane - Who was Captain in 1881 before returning to Victoria where he played for Essendon Football Club in the VFA. In 1884, he was the first captain of the Fitzroy Football Club. He played in three Test Cricket matches for Australia between 1885 and 1888.
