= Patrick McShane =

Australian cricketer (1858–1903)

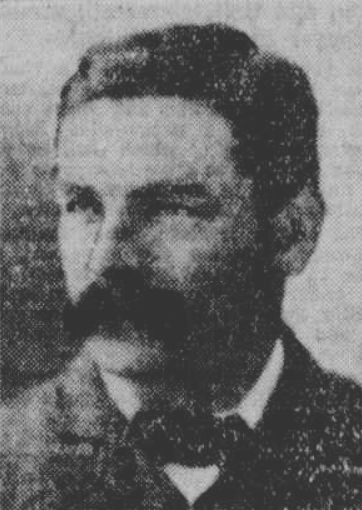

Personal information
- Full name: Patrick George McShane
- Born: 18 April 1858; Keilor, Victoria, Australia
- Died: 11 December 1903 (aged 45); Kew, Victoria, Australia
- Nickname: Paddy
- Batting: Left-handed
- Bowling: Left-arm medium
- Role: Bowler, umpire

International information
- National side: Australia (1885–1888)
- Test debut (cap 41): 21 March 1885 v England
- Last Test: 10 February 1888 v England

Domestic team information
- Years: Team
- 1880/81 to 1892/93: Victoria

Career statistics
Competition	Test	First-class
Matches	3	36
Runs scored	26	1117
Batting average	5.20	18.31
100s/50s	0/0	0/5
Top score	12*	88
Balls bowled	108	4479
Wickets	1	72
Bowling average	48.00	25.36
5 wickets in innings	0	4
10 wickets in match	0	1
Best bowling	1/39	9/45
Catches/stumpings	2/0	24/0
- Source: Cricinfo, 28 November 2019

Patrick George McShane (18 April 1858 – 11 December 1903) was an Australian cricketer who played in three Test matches between 1885 and 1888.

In the 1880s Paddy McShane was often described as "the best all-round athlete in Victoria", playing both elite football and cricket. He played for Essendon Football Club in the VFA and helped found Fitzroy Football Club before playing Test matches in cricket and embarking on a track and field career. After his sporting career ended, McShane was employed as curator at St Kilda Cricket Club's ground.

== Cricket career ==
He played in 36 first-class matches, most of them for Victoria, between 1880/81 and 1892/93. He scored 1117 runs at an average of 18.31 with a highest score of 88. As a left-arm medium-pace bowler he took 72 wickets at an average of 25.36 with best figures of 9/45 in an innings. He also took 24 catches.

McShane is rare in that he was a Test match umpire before he played in a Test match. He was selected to be twelfth man for Australia in the Test against England in Sydney in March 1885, but after several nominated umpires declined or were rejected by the teams, he was asked to umpire. Australia won the match by eight wickets after George Bonnor scored a century in 100 minutes, the fastest in Test matches to that time. McShane's colleague was Ted Elliott.

McShane was then selected for the Test in Melbourne the following week, making 9 and 12 not out. He played in two more Tests against England in the 1887–88 season, failing with the bat – his last three innings were ducks – and taking only one wicket.

== Football career ==
McShane was captain of the Adelaide club South Park in 1881 and returned to Victoria in 1882 to play for Essendon in the Victorian Football Association. In 1884 he was the first captain of the Fitzroy Football Club.

== Personal life ==
In 1887 McShane married Jeannie Brown and together they had six children. In 1901 he became mentally ill and was admitted to Kew Asylum. After two years there he died of influenza in December 1903, leaving a widow and a large family.

== Sources ==
- Pollard, Jack, Australian Cricket: 1803–1893, The Formative Years. Sydney, The Book Company, 1995. (ISBN 0-207-15490-2)
- Pollard, Jack, Australian Cricket: The game and the players. Sydney, Hodder & Stoughton, 1982. (ISBN 0-340-28796-9)
