= Aldam Pettinger =

Australian sportsman

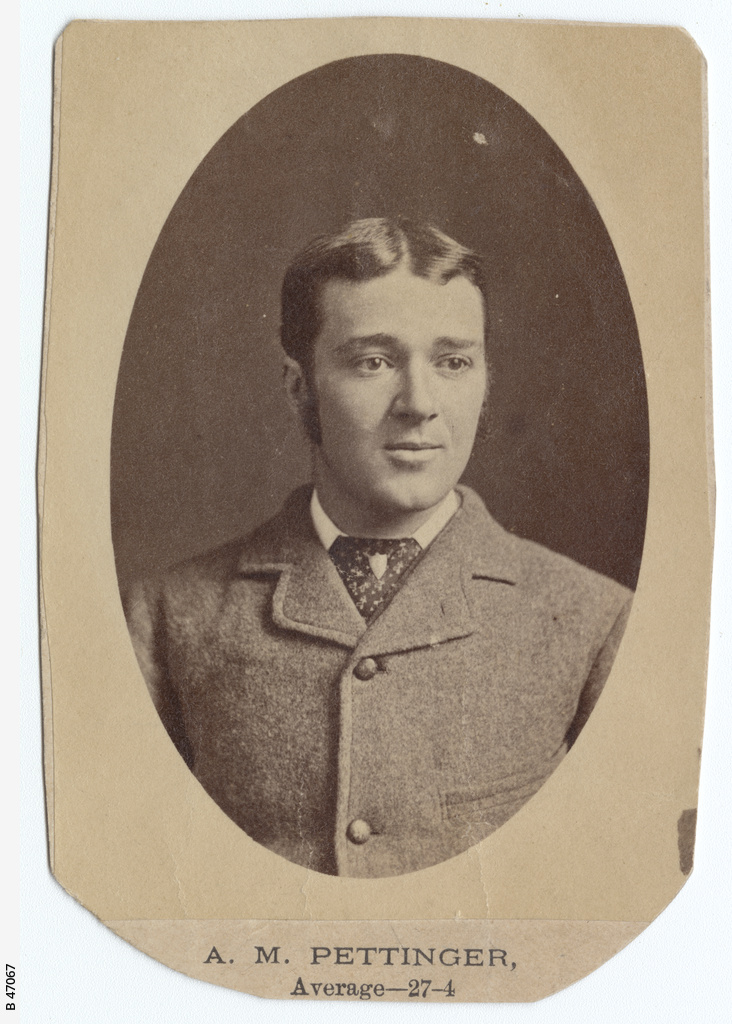

Personal information
- Full name: Aldam Murr Pettinger
- Born: 30 July 1859; Kent Town, South Australia
- Died: 18 August 1950 (aged 91); Adelaide, South Australia
- Batting: Right-handed
- Role: Batsman

Domestic team information
- Years: Team
- 1880/81: South Australia

Career statistics
Competition	First-class
Matches	1
Runs scored	12
Batting average	6.00
100s/50s	0/0
Top score	12
Catches/stumpings	1/0
- Source: Cricinfo, 18 September 2020

Aldam Murr Pettinger (30 July 1859 – 18 August 1950) was a leading sportsman in South Australia in the late nineteenth century.

Born in Adelaide in 1859, the son of a police inspector, Pettinger represented South Australia in cricket, Australian rules football, baseball and bowls, was a leading local lacrosse player, golfer, steeplechase rider, an excellent gun shot, and bred and trained hunting dogs.

Pettinger began playing club cricket for the North Adelaide Young Men's Society (later known as North Adelaide) in 1876/77, serving as captain for many seasons, retiring at the end of the 1896/97 season.

Pettinger played in one first-class match for South Australia in 1880/81 (South Australia's first 11-a- side match against Victoria) and a non-first-class match, for a South Australian XV against Australia on 26–29 November 1880.

Pettinger co founded the South Australian Football Association (SAFA) club South Park together with John Creswell in 1877 and captained the club until its dissolution in 1884, after which he played for the newly formed Adelaide Football Club on its admission to SAFA in 1885.

In 1879, Pettinger was also selected to play for South Australia Football Association in the first intercolonial matches against the Victorian Football Association in Melbourne.

After 12 seasons of senior football in the SAFA with South Park and then Adelaide, he retired at the end of the 1888 Season. He was reported as the most popular player in the city and was described as the old warhorse. He could played either back, half-hack, or centre.

Following his retirement from cricket and football, Pettinger became involved in golf and lawn bowls, winning the Adelaide Bowling Club championships "many times" and for many years was able to play a round of golf in less than his age in years. He was an active member of the Royal Adelaide Golf Club at Seaton and was still playing a full round of golf at age 90.

Outside of sport, Pettinger worked for D. and W. Murray Ltd, a wholesale importing firm, for 50 years, starting upon leaving school at 16 and retiring as company secretary and director, and served as a Justice of the Peace.

At Age 91, residing at Lower Mitcham, on his death in August 1950, Pettinger was referred to as "the grand old man of South Australian sport".

== Sources ==
- Harte, C. (1990) SACA: The History of the South Australian Cricket Association, Sports Marketing: Adelaide. ISBN 0958798036
- Page, R. (1984) South Australian Cricketers 1877–1984, Association of Cricket Statisticians and Historians: Retford, Nottinghamshire.
- Sando, G. (1997) Grass Roots, South Australian Cricket Association: Adelaide. ISBN 9781862544352
