= Winfield Statewide Cup =

Australian rules football tournament in Tasmania, Australia

Tournament information
- Sport: Australian rules football
- Location: Tasmania, Australia
- Dates: 29 March 1980–17 May 1980
- Established: 1980
- Venues: North Hobart Oval; York Park; Bellerive Oval; KGV Oval; Devonport Oval; West Park Oval; TCA Ground; Windsor Park; Youngtown Oval; Boyer Oval; Queenborough Oval; Latrobe Rec. Ground; Penguin Sports Ground; Longford Oval; Ulverstone Rec. Ground; Smithton Football Ground; Scottsdale Rec. Ground; Girdlestone Park; Wynyard Oval
- Participants: Burnie Tigers; City-South Redlegs; Clarence Kangaroos; Cooee Bulldogs; Devonport Magpies; East Devonport Swans; East Launceston Demons; Glenorchy Magpies; Hobart Tigers; Latrobe Demons; Launceston Blues; Longford Tigers; New Norfolk Eagles; North Hobart Demons; North Launceston Robins; Penguin Two Blues; Sandy Bay Seagulls; Scottsdale Magpies; Smithton Saints; Wynyard Cats; Ulverstone Robins

Final positions
- Champions: Hobart
- Runner-up: Clarence

Tournament statistics
- Top scorer: Paul Courto

The Winfield Statewide Cup was an Australian rules football tournament held in Tasmania, Australia between the top twenty-one (21) major football clubs across Tasmania from the three major footballing bodies across the state (at the time), the TANFL, the NTFA and the NWFU.

The tournament was played in a five-round format held prior to the regular season proper, over a period of seven weeks between 29 March and 17 May 1980.

== Origins ==
The Winfield Statewide Cup competition came to fruition after discussions had been continuing for several years, as far back as 1972, mostly from TANFL executives and leading players and coaches, in wanting to expand the TANFL into a statewide competition to try to improve the perceived ailing standard of football across the state in recent years and disappointing performances of Tasmanian teams at Interstate level, notably Tasmania's disastrous displays at the 1969 and 1972 Australian National Football Carnivals which was causing the state's football reputation much harm and placing in jeopardy Tasmania's hopes of gaining Division One status within the Australian National Football Congress (and the large increase in funding the sport would ultimately receive from the ANFC as a result of attaining that status), this coincided with a disappointing loss to Queensland at Ulverstone in early 1980.

The calls had grown stronger from within the TANFL after the classic 1975 State Premiership decider between Glenorchy and North Launceston (described by many old-timers as one of the best games of football ever seen in Hobart) and after the State Premiership was finally brought to an end in 1978 in favour of sending a Tasmanian team to play interstate, the TANFL, by then seeking all control of Australian Rules Football within Tasmania ordered all clubs from the NTFA and the NWFU to participate in the tournament alongside their TANFL counterparts.
Due to the perceived dogmatic approach by the TANFL in regard to its treatment of Northern & Coastal clubs, the final straw came when North Launceston had its home Semi Final replay against Clarence switched from York Park to North Hobart Oval by the TANFL in an effort to maximise the crowd attendance.

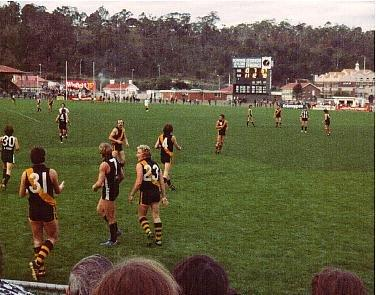
Hobart and Glenorchy do battle in the Winfield Cup Semi Final at North Hobart, Glenorchy 11-points ahead, ten minutes into the third quarter.

Despite the uproar from the North over the decision, a crowd of 4,758 attended (the York Park match attracted 2,070 the previous week) and the Robins lost in the dying seconds by 2-points.
The Hobart Football Club, who had finished last in the TANFL in 1978 and 1979, rose from mediocrity under new coach Paul Sproule and took out the Winfield Statewide Cup beating Clarence in the Grand Final by 29-points at North Hobart Oval on 17 May 1980 in a dour, defensive game.
On the same day, Glenorchy handed North Launceston a shock 77-point defeat at York Park in the playoff for third and fourth place.
Despite some very good football displayed, the Winfield Statewide Cup failed to capture the football public's attention which resulted in poor crowds and a financial loss for the League.

Cigarette company Winfield sponsored the tournament to the tune of A$37,500 with a view to increasing that to A$50,000 for the tournament the following year (which was ultimately not held).

In the aftermath of this tournament the TANFL planned to stage another Winfield Statewide Cup in 1981 with a view to formulating a full TFL Statewide League competition in 1982.

However, at a meeting of the three main bodies in Launceston in August 1980, the NTFA and NWFU voted against the proposal believing it not to be in the best interests of football in the North.

As a result, the Northern & Coastal clubs banded together in protest and formed the Greater Northern Football League (GNFL) in 1981 in order to disassociate themselves with the TANFL.

After its formation, GNFL president Brendon Lyons launched a scathing attack on TANFL president John Bennett, accusing him of hatching plans aimed at denigrating Northern football by attempting to take six clubs to the statewide competition and seeking to demote the remaining uninvited clubs to junior status.
The TANFL, as the sport's governing body in Tasmania responded by introducing new qualification entries for players named for state duties, ruling that all players must play in the TANFL to be included in the squad, effectively banning all players from northern leagues from participating in the Tasmanian representative teams.
On 10 June 1982, the TANFL executive met at TFL House in Hobart and decided to put an end to talk of a statewide competition vowing to go it alone meaning that the GNFL could finish and a return to three separate leagues could resume.

== Participating clubs ==
=== Group 1 Teams ===
- Clarence District Football Club.
- Cooee Football Club.
- Launceston Football Club.
- Penguin Football Club.
- Longford Football Club.

=== Group 2 Teams ===
- Glenorchy District Football Club.
- City-South Football Club.
- Ulverstone Football Club.
- New Norfolk District Football Club.
- Latrobe Football Club.

=== Group 3 Teams ===
- North Launceston Football Club.
- North Hobart Football Club.
- Devonport Football Club.
- Sandy Bay Football Club.
- Burnie Football Club.

=== Group 4 Teams ===
- Hobart Football Club.
- East Launceston Football Club.
- Scottsdale Football Club.
- East Devonport Football Club.
- Smithton Football Club.
- Wynyard Football Club.

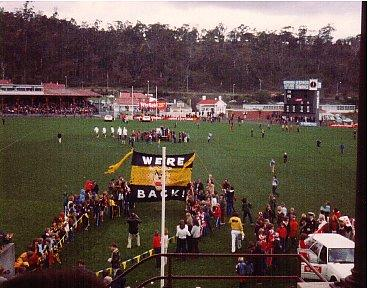
Hobart's banner reads "We're Back!" prior to the 1980 Winfield Statewide Cup final.

== Group 1 Ladder ==
Team	Played	Won	Lost	Draw	Bye	For	Against	Percentage	Points
Clarence	4	3	1	0	1	509	312	163.14%	12
Cooee	4	3	1	0	1	450	357	126.05%	12
Launceston	4	2	2	0	1	419	383	109.40%	8
Penguin	4	2	2	0	1	372	394	94.42%	8
Longford	4	0	4	0	1	256	530	48.30%	0

== Group 2 Ladder ==
Team	Played	Won	Lost	Draw	Bye	For	Against	Percentage	Points
Glenorchy	4	4	0	0	1	412	248	166.13%	12
New Norfolk	4	2	2	0	1	384	317	121.14%	8
City-South	4	2	2	0	1	273	339	80.53%	8
Latrobe	4	2	2	0	1	336	423	79.43%	8
Ulverstone	4	0	4	0	1	304	382	79.58%	0

== Group 3 Ladder ==
Team	Played	Won	Lost	Draw	Bye	For	Against	Percentage	Points
North Launceston	4	3	1	0	1	508	292	173.97%	12
Devonport	4	3	1	0	1	432	389	111.05%	12
North Hobart	4	3	1	0	1	430	447	96.20%	12
Sandy Bay	4	1	3	0	1	413	457	90.37%	4
Burnie Tigers	4	0	4	0	1	318	516	61.63%	0

== Group 4 Ladder ==
Team	Played	Won	Lost	Draw	Bye	For	Against	Percentage	Points
Hobart	5	4	0	1	0	559	353	158.36%	18
Scottsdale	5	4	1	0	0	435	366	118.85%	16
East Launceston	5	3	2	0	0	488	401	121.70%	12
East Devonport	4	1	3	0	1	318	372	85.48%	4
Wynyard	4	0	3	1	1	294	349	84.24%	2
Smithton	5	0	5	0	0	256	509	50.29%	0

== First round ==
(Saturday, 29 March 1980)
Group 1

- Clarence 12.22 (94) d Penguin 5.8 (38) – Att: 561 at Penguin Sports Ground.
- Cooee 13.13 (91) d Launceston 12.12 (84) – Att: 592 at Windsor Park

Group 2

- Glenorchy 13.12 (90) d New Norfolk 5.12 (42) – Att: 756 at Boyer Oval
- City-South 9.19 (73) d Ulverstone 7.12 (54) – Att: 685 at Youngtown Memorial Ground

Group 3

- Nth Launceston 20.18 (138) d Sandy Bay 11.17 (83) – Att: 1,579 at North Hobart Oval (Double-Header)
- Nth Hobart 20.17 (137) d Devonport 16.16 (112) – Att: 1,579 at North Hobart Oval (Double-Header)

Group 4

- Hobart 17.23 (125) d Smithton 8.4 (52) – Att: 551 at Latrobe Recreation Ground.
- East Launceston 17.18 (120) d East Devonport 12.11 (83) – Att: 1,018 at York Park
- Scottsdale 14.11 (95) d Wynyard 10.12 (72) – Att: 1,400 at Scottsdale Recreation Ground

== Second round ==
(Saturday, 5 April & Monday, 7 April 1980)
Group 1

- Clarence 18.18 (126) d Launceston 13.12 (90) – Att: 1,977 at North Hobart Oval
- Cooee 23.18 (156) d Longford 8.12 (60) – Att: 783 at Longford Oval

Group 2

- City-South 12.20 (92) d New Norfolk 11.19 (85) – Att: 1,329 at Windsor Park (Double-Header)
- Latrobe 16.9 (105) d Ulverstone 13.17 (95) – Att: 434 at Ulverstone Recreation Ground

Group 3

- Nth Hobart 18.23 (131) d Burnie 13.10 (88) – Att: 2,952 at North Hobart Oval (Double-Header)
- Devonport 15.18 (108) d Sandy Bay 15.12 (102) – Att: 902 at Devonport Oval

Group 4

- East Launceston 19.14 (128) d Wynyard 13.7 (85) – Att: 1,329 at Windsor Park (Double-Header)
- Hobart 20.17 (137) d Scottsdale 11.11 (77) – Att: 2,952 at North Hobart Oval (Double-Header)
- East Devonport 15.20 (110) d Smithton 10.13 (73) – Att: 1,500 at Smithton Football Ground.

== Third round ==
(Saturday, 12 April 1980)
Group 1

- Clarence 29.25 (199) d Longford 8.9 (57) – Att: 800 at Bellerive Oval
- Launceston 21.12 (138) d Penguin 18.5 (113) – Att: 1,936 at York Park (Double-Header)

Group 2

- Glenorchy 14.14 (98) d Ulverstone 12.15 (87) – Att: 1,097 at Devonport Oval (Double-Header)
- Latrobe 13.12 (90) d City-South 8.15 (63) – Att: 1,097 at Devonport Oval (Double-Header)

Group 3

- Nth Launceston 21.18 (144) d Nth Hobart 8.10 (58) – Att: 1,936 at York Park (Double-Header)
- Devonport 16.17 (113) d Burnie 9.17 (71) – Att: 926 at West Park Oval

Group 4

- Hobart 16.12 (108) d East Launceston 11.11 (77) – Att: 1,970 at North Hobart Oval
- Scottsdale 17.15 (117) d Smithton 4.12 (36) – Att: 592 at Youngtown Memorial Ground

== Fourth round ==
(Saturday, 19 April 1980)
Group 1

- Cooee 19.13 (127) d Clarence 12.18 (90) – Att: 605 at West Park Oval (Double-Header)
- Penguin 14.14 (98) d Longford 12.14 (86) – Att: 605 at West Park Oval (Double-Header)

Group 2

- New Norfolk 23.13 (151) d Latrobe 9.13 (67) – Att: 917 at North Hobart Oval
- Glenorchy 16.14 (110) d City-South 4.21 (45) – Att: 1,324 at KGV Football Park

Group 3

- Nth Hobart 15.14 (104) d Sandy Bay 15.13 (103) – Att: 1,320 at Queenborough Oval
- Nth Launceston 21.21 (147) d Burnie 7.10 (52) – Att: 1,044 at York Park (Double-Header)

Group 4

- East Launceston 14.16 (100) d Smithton 7.7 (49) – Att: 1,044 at York Park (Double-Header)
- Wynyard 11.14 (80) d Hobart 11.14 (80) – Att: 475 at Wynyard Oval.
- Scottsdale 10.10 (70) d East Devonport 9.4 (58) – Att: 433 at Girdlestone Park.

== Fifth round ==
(Friday, 25 April & Saturday, 26 April 1980)
Group 1

- Penguin 17.21 (123) d Cooee 10.16 (76) – Att: 607 at Penguin Sports Ground.
- Launceston 15.17 (107) d Longford 7.11 (53) – Att: 834 at York Park

Group 2

- Glenorchy 17.12 (114) d Latrobe 10.14 (74) – Att: 666 at Latrobe Recreation Ground.
- New Norfolk 15.16 (106) d Ulverstone 9.14 (68) – Att: 1,187 at North Hobart Oval

Group 3

- Sandy Bay 19.11 (125) d Burnie 15.17 (107) – Att: 457 at West Park Oval
- Devonport 14.15 (99) d Nth Launceston 11.13 (79) – Att: 1,511 at Devonport Oval

Group 4

- Hobart 16.13 (109) d East Devonport 8.19 (67) – Att: 1,703 at TCA Ground
- Wynyard 8.9 (57) d Smithton 7.4 (46) – Att: 785 at Smithton Football Ground.
- Scottsdale 11.10 (76) d East Launceston 8.15 (63) – Att: 793 at Scottsdale Recreation Ground.

== Non-Finalists Play-Off Round ==
(Saturday, 3 May 1980)

- New Norfolk 18.25 (133) d Nth Hobart 20.9 (129) – Att: 4,307 at North Hobart Oval (Double-Header)
- Cooee 23.18 (156) d Scottsdale 23.7 (145) – Att: 561 at West Park Oval (Double-Header)
- Burnie 18.9 (117) d Wynyard 15.21 (111) – Att: 561 at West Park Oval (Double-Header)
- Devonport 19.20 (134) d East Launceston 6.12 (48) – Att: 973 at Devonport Oval
- East Devonport 25.19 (169) d Penguin 11.13 (79) – Att: 973 at Devonport Oval (Double-Header)
- City-South 14.13 (97) d Launceston 12.8 (80) – Att: 602 at Windsor Park
- Sandy Bay 27.29 (191) d Latrobe 11.11 (77) – Att: 567 at Queenborough Oval
- Ulverstone 20.23 (143) d Longford 6.7 (43) – Att: 335 at Longford Oval.

== Semi-finals ==
(Saturday, 3 May 1980)
Winner Group 4 v Winner Group 2
● Hobart: 3.2 (20) | 9.7 (61) | 15.10 (100) | 19.12 (126)
● Glenorchy: 9.3 (57) | 10.12 (72) | 12.13 (85) | 13.16 (94)
Attendance: 4,307 at North Hobart Oval (Double-Header)

(Saturday, 3 May 1980)
Winner Group 3 v Winner Group 1
● Nth Launceston: 2.4 (16) | 5.6 (36) | 12.11 (83) | 16.18 (114)
● Clarence: 7.6 (48) | 12.8 (80) | 15.10 (100) | 17.12 (114)
Attendance: 2,070 at York Park

=== Semi Final Replay ===
(Saturday, 10 May 1980)
● Clarence: 1.8 (14) | 5.14 (44) | 11.15 (81) | 16.19 (115)
● Nth Launceston: 2.4 (16) | 5.7 (37) | 13.13 (91) | 16.17 (113)
Attendance: 4,758 at North Hobart Oval

== Third Place Play-Off Match ==
(Saturday, 17 May 1980)
● Glenorchy: 3.6 (24) | 5.10 (40) | 13.17 (95) | 23.20 (158)
● Nth Launceston: 4.2 (26) | 9.6 (60) | 11.7 (73) | 12.12 (84)
Attendance: 1,230 at York Park.

== Winfield Cup Grand Final ==
(Saturday, 17 May 1980)
● Hobart: 1.5 (11) | 4.9 (33) | 8.13 (61) | 9.21 (75)
● Clarence: 2.2 (14) | 3.2 (20) | 6.3 (39) | 7.4 (46)
Attendance: 5,961 at North Hobart Oval

Source: All scores and statistics courtesy of the Hobart Mercury, Saturday Evening Mercury (SEM), Launceston Examiner and North West Advocate publications

== See also ==
- Australian rules football in Tasmania
