= Greater Northern Football League =

- Founded: 1981
- First season: 1981
- Folded: 1982
- No. of teams: 15

The Greater Northern Football League (GNFL) was an Australian rules football competition played between the fifteen (15) major football clubs across Northern Tasmania from the two major footballing bodies across the north of the state, the Northern Tasmanian Football Association (NTFA), and the North West Football Union (NWFU) in 1981 and 1982.

== Participating clubs ==
=== NTFA Clubs ===
Club	Colours	Nickname	Home Ground	Est.
City-South		Redlegs	Youngtown Memorial Oval, Youngtown	1879
East Launceston		Demons	York Park, Invermay	1948
Launceston		Blues	Windsor Park, Riverside	1875
Longford		Tigers	Longford Recreation Ground, Longford	1878
North Launceston		Robins	York Park, Invermay	1893
Scottsdale		Magpies	Scottsdale Recreation Ground, Scottsdale	1889

=== NWFU Clubs ===
Club	Colours	Nickname	Home Ground	Est.
Burnie		Tigers	West Park Oval, Burnie	1885
Cooee		Bulldogs	West Park Oval, Burnie	1894
Devonport		Magpies	Devonport Oval, Devonport	1881
East Devonport		Swans	Girdlestone Park, East Devonport	1901
Latrobe		Demons	Darrel Baldock Oval, Latrobe	1881
Penguin		Two Blues	Dial Park, Penguin	1890
Smithton		Saints	Circular Head Recreation Ground, Smithton	1907
Ulverstone		Robins	Ulverstone Recreation Ground, Ulverstone	1888
Wynyard		Cats	Wynyard Football Ground, Wynyard	1885

== 1982 Ladder ==
Great Northern FL	Wins	Byes	Losses	Draws	For	Against	%	Pts
Penguin	15	0	3	1	2031	1683	120.68%	62
Cooee	14	0	5	0	2633	1645	160.06%	56
Launceston	14	0	5	0	2054	1857	110.61%	56
Ulverstone	13	0	6	0	2133	1651	129.19%	52
Smithton	11	0	7	0	2179	1655	131.66%	44
Devonport	11	0	8	0	2024	1842	109.88%	44
North Launceston	9	0	9	1	2308	2128	108.46%	38
Burnie	9	0	10	0	2026	1933	104.81%	36
East Launceston	8	0	11	0	1979	2151	92.00%	32
Latrobe	8	0	11	0	1798	2008	89.54%	32
Wynyard	8	0	11	0	1704	1948	87.47%	32
Scottsdale	7	0	12	0	1571	1945	80.77%	28
East Devonport	6	0	13	0	1660	2242	74.04%	24
City-South	4	0	13	0	1613	2161	74.64%	16
Longford	2	0	15	0	1655	2519	65.70%	8

NWFU FINALS

Final	Team	G	B	Pts	Team	G	B	Pts
1st Semi	Ulverstone	14	18	102	Smithton	9	15	69
2nd Semi	Cooee	20	9	129	Penguin	11	10	76
Preliminary	Penguin	13	5	83	Ulverstone	8	11	59
Grand	Cooee	16	15	111	Penguin	16	5	101

NTFA FINALS

Final	Team	G	B	Pts	Team	G	B	Pts
1st Semi	Scottsdale	21	15	141	East Launceston	12	12	84
2nd Semi	Launceston	17	8	110	North Launceston	16	11	107
Preliminary	Scottsdale	16	12	108	North Launceston	11	11	77
Grand	Scottsdale	17	9	111	Launceston	12	10	82

== See also ==
- Australian rules football in Tasmania
