= Brian Waters (footballer) =

Australian rules footballer

Personal information
- Full name: Brian Gordon Waters
- Born: 18 April 1944 (age 82); Launceston, Tasmania
- Original team: East Launceston
- Position: Centre

Playing career^{1}
Years	Club	Games (Goals)
1962–66, 1970–73	East Launceston	
1967–69	Latrobe	
- ^{1} Playing statistics correct to the end of 1973.

Brian Gordon "Mousey" Waters (born 18 April 1944) is a former Australian rules footballer who played in Tasmania during the 1960s and 1970s. In 1968 he won the Wander Medal, the North Western Football Union (NWFU) best and fairest award.

== Early career ==
Waters debuted with East Launceston against Longford in the Northern Tasmanian Football Association (NTFA) on 19 May 1962 and played most of his career in the centre or wing positions.

He polled well in the club Best and Fairest awards, finishing third in 1963 and in 1965 was runner-up to Norm Webb.

== To Latrobe ==
In 1967 he joined Latrobe in the NWFU. The next season Waters polled 16 votes to win the Wander Medal on a countback from Ian Stevenson (East Devonport), and also won Latrobe's Best and Fairest award.

He was a member of Latrobe's premiership winning team in 1969 under coach Darrel Baldock.

== Return to East Launceston ==
Waters returned to East Launceston in 1970. A broken nose delayed his start to the 1971 season by a few weeks, so his effort in the remaining games to poll well in various awards was quite notable. He finished equal third in the Hec Smith Medal, the NTFA's best and fairest award, and won the club Best and Fairest.

Midway through the 1973 season he suffered a serious facial injury which led to his retirement from the game.

== Representative career ==
Waters played at least nine representative matches between 1963 and 1970, six for the NTFA and three for the NWFU.

== Honours and achievements ==
Team
NWFU Premiership

- Latrobe 1969

Individual

Competition

- NWFU best and fairest (winner) 1968
- NTFA best and fairest (eq. third) 1971

Club

- East Launceston B&F: 1963 (3rd), 1965 (2nd), 1971 (winner)
- Latrobe B&F: 1968 (winner)
