= Mark Williams (Australian footballer, born 1957) =

Australian rules footballer

Personal information
- Full name: Mark Edward Williams
- Born: 7 October 1957 (age 69)
- Original team: Penguin (NWFU)
- Height: 194 cm (6 ft 4 in)
- Weight: 107 kg (236 lb)

Playing career^{1}
Years	Club	Games (Goals)
1977–1978	North Melbourne	4 (0)
1979	Footscray	5 (1)
Total		9 (1)
- ^{1} Playing statistics correct to the end of 1979.

Mark Edward Williams (born 7 October 1957) is a former Australian rules footballer who played with North Melbourne and Footscray in the Victorian Football League (VFL).

Williams came to the VFL from Tasmania, where he had played for the Penguin Football Club. He made one appearance for North Melbourne in the 1977 VFL season, a premiership year. The following year he played three games before badly injuring his knee. He was traded to Footscray in 1979, along with teammates Gary Cowton and John Moysey, in exchange for Brownlow Medal winner Gary Dempsey. He appeared only five times for Footscray, before returning home.

He spent some time playing for Devonport in the North West Football Union (NWFU) and was club coach in 1986. It would be the final year of the NWFU and Williams moved on to East Devonport, who were competing in the new Northern Tasmanian Football League. He was the league's leading goal-kicking in 1988, with 119 goals. At a new club in 1989, Latrobe, Williams bettered that tally to kick 132 goals for the season.
