= Cec Rheinberger =

Australian rules footballer

Personal information
- Full name: Cec Rheinberger
- Born: 24 February 1949 (age 77)
- Original teams: Oaklands, Yarrawonga
- Height: 182 cm (6 ft 0 in)
- Weight: 86 kg (190 lb)

Playing career^{1}
Years	Club	Games (Goals)
1966–71	Fitzroy	27 (3)
- ^{1} Playing statistics correct to the end of 1971.

Cec Rheinberger (born 24 February 1949) is a former Australian rules footballer who played for Fitzroy in the Victorian Football League (VFL).

Originally from Oaklands in the Coreen & District Football League, prior to playing with Yarrawonga in the Ovens & Murray Football League.

Rheinberger was initially selected in the seniors for round one in 1966 VFL season along with Wodonga's Mike Andrews but a permit was not approved. He then debuted in round ten against Melbourne, along with Alex Ruscuklic, but only played the one match in 1966.

He played 15 games the following season but from then on spent most of his time in the reserves.

Later, in 1974, Rheinberger was a Wander Medallist in the North West Football Union, while playing with Devonport.
