= Arthur Hodgson (footballer) =

Australian rules footballer

Personal information
- Born: 8 January 1926; Sydney, New South Wales
- Died: 12 May 2003 (aged 77)
- Original team: Queenstown, Tasmania
- Debut: Round 4, 1948, Carlton vs. Footscray, at Princes Park
- Height: 176 cm (5 ft 9 in)
- Weight: 77 kg (170 lb)

Playing career^{1}
Years	Club	Games (Goals)
1948–1952	Carlton	76 (7)
- ^{1} Playing statistics correct to the end of 1952.

Career highlights
- Carlton best and fairest: 1950; Wander Medal: 1955; Victorian representative 4 times; Tasmanian representative 17 times; Five Australian Football Carnivals

Arthur Edward Clarence Hodgson (8 January 1926 – 12 May 2003) was an Australian rules footballer who played in the Victorian Football League (VFL) and North Western Football Union (NWFU). Born in Sydney but raised in Queenstown, Tasmania, Hodgson was recruited by the Carlton Football Club in Victoria, playing 76 games and winning the Robert Reynolds Trophy as club best and fairest in 1950. He returned to Tasmania in 1953 as captain-coach of the Ulverstone Football Club, piloting the Robins to four premierships and one state premiership (the first by a coastal team) in his seven-year tenure; individually, he won the Wander Medal as league best and fairest in 1955. Hodgson was named in the Tasmanian Team of the Century and was inducted into the Tasmanian Hall of Fame.
