= Geoffrey Martin (footballer) =

Australian rules footballer (1927–2020)

Personal information
- Full name: Geoffrey Bernard Martin
- Nickname: Paddy
- Born: 16 July 1927; Launceston, Tasmania
- Died: 12 June 2020 (aged 92)

Playing career
Years	Club	Games (Goals)
1946, 1948–54	Launceston	116
1947	Sandy Bay	?
1955–57	Ulverstone	?
1958–?	Burnie	?
Total		312

Geoffrey Bernard "Paddy" Martin (16 July 1927 – 12 June 2020) was an Australian rules footballer who played in Tasmania with Launceston, Sandy Bay, Ulverstone and Burnie. He was a half back flanker in Launceston's official 'Team of the Century' and in 2005 was inducted into Tasmanian Football Hall of Fame as a coaching legend. Martin also represented Tasmania once in first-class cricket.

Martin was born in Launceston, Tasmania. He made an immediate impression on his debut for Launceston in 1946, and was selected that year to play with the Northern Tasmanian Football Association's representative team. The following season he crossed to Sandy Bay but returned to Launceston in 1948 where he stayed until 1954, despite getting an offer to go to Victorian Football League club Melbourne. In 1951 he appeared with the Tasmanian interstate side for the first time and also appeared for his state at the 1953 Adelaide Carnival. After 116 games at Launceston, he joined Ulverstone and participated in three premierships. He also won Ulverstone's 'best and fairest' in 1955. His next port of call was as playing coach of Burnie and he steered them to successive premierships from 1958 to 1960. For the next six years he was the non-playing coach of the North West Football Union's representative team for intrastate games. He coached Devonport in a non-playing capacity in 1970 and 1971.

Martin came from a strong cricketing family. His father, also named Geoffrey, was a decent batsman for Tasmania for over a decade while his uncle Gordon represented Queensland at cricket. Martin himself made an appearance in a first-class cricket match for Tasmania, against Victoria at the North Tasmania Cricket Association Ground in Launceston during the 1950/51 season. He batted at seven in both innings but could only manage four and a duck, dismissed by Thomas Perrin on each occasion.

== See also ==
- List of Tasmanian representative cricketers
