= Ruscuklic =

Ruscuklic is a surname. Notable people with the surname include:

- Alex Ruscuklic (born 1948), Australian rules footballer
- Peter Ruscuklic (1955–2014), Australian rules footballer
