= Tasmanian State Premiership =

- Sport: Australian rules football
- Founded: 1909; 117 years ago
- Folded: 1978; 48 years ago
- Most titles: North Hobart (12)

The Tasmanian State Premiership was an Australian rules football tournament which was contested at the conclusion of the season, initially between the reigning Tasmanian Football League (TFL/TANFL) and Northern Tasmanian Football Association (NTFA) premiers, and then from 1950 also by the NWFU premiers, to determine an overall premier team for the state of Tasmania. The state premiership was contested 57 times between 1909 and 1978.

== History ==
The Tasmanian State Premiership was an official match that determined the winner to be awarded the title of Tasmania's best domestic football team. It started as an unofficial North versus South club match in 1904, and from 1909 it gained official status on the Tasmanian football calendar.

It ran as a match between the premiers of the TFL/TANFL and NTFA, alternating between the TCA Ground (Upper Cricket Ground) and the NTCA Ground until North Hobart Oval and York Park became the premier venues in the South and North. A perpetual trophy known as the Bulldog Cup, established in 1915 but not awarded until the next State Premiership in 1920, was awarded to the State Premiers throughout the competition's history.

In 1950, the NWFU was added to the state premiership on a trial basis; under the arrangements that year, the NTFA and NWFU premiers played off against each other in a preliminary final, and the winner faced the TANFL premiers. The following year, due to feelings that the football season was too long, that the state premiership tended to draw lower crowds than other special fixtures, and a dispute over whether or not the Queenstown Football Association should also have been eligible to compete, it was decided to abolish the fixture. However, the TANFL and NTFA premiers still played an informal state premiership game at the end of the 1952 and 1953 seasons, and the state premiership was formally re-instated in 1954 with the TANFL, NTFA and NWFU all competing. On a rotating basis, one of the three leagues would host and qualify directly for the final, and the other two leagues would play off in the preliminary final.

There were a total of 57 formal State Grand Finals between 1909 and 1978, with sixteen different clubs taking out the title: North Hobart (12), Cananore (10), City/City-South (7, plus one unofficial), New Town/Glenorchy (5, plus one unofficial), Launceston (5) and North Launceston (3, plus two unofficial) won the most titles. TANFL clubs won 33 of the 57 state premierships; NTFA clubs won 17 state premierships; and NWFU clubs won 6 State Premierships from 24 opportunities.

There were several occasions when competing teams would have a guernsey clash; in these circumstances, it was most common for each team to wear its league's intrastate representative guernsey, rather than its own club guernsey.

In 1972, 1973 and 1975, the Tasmanian State Premiers were invited to contest the Championship of Australia, a knock-out tournament which featured the premiers of the VFL, SANFL and WANFL.

In 1974 the Tasmanian regional premier teams, namely City-South, Burnie and North Hobart, sent a combined team featuring players from each premier team to contest the Championship of Australia.

By the 1970s, the State Premiership had begun to show a decline in interest from football patrons and was taken less seriously by the clubs and on 1 October 1978, the final match was played at West Park Oval between Cooee and Sandy Bay in front of a crowd of only 3,860.

The 1979 State Premiership series did not proceed, but the idea was not dead. In 1980 the three regional leagues contested a State Premiership series in the first 6 weeks of the season. This was sponsored by Winfield cigarette company and the State Premiership was won by Hobart.

In the period between 1981 and 1985 the leagues could not agree on the most viable format for a Tasmanian state premiership competition. Finally in 1986 two NTFA Clubs determined to field a senior team in the TFL. The two teams accepted were North Launceston and East Launceston. Within a short 6-week period of commencement East Launceston fully merged with City-South and became South Launceston.

In 1987 two Clubs from North-west Tasmania, Cooee (named Burnie Hawks) and Devonport (named Devonport Blues) joined the TFL and it became a truly Statewide Premiership Competition. There were 6 teams from Southern Tasmania, and 2 each from Northern and North-west Tasmania.

Since 1986 the winners of the Tasmanian Football League premiership are considered 'state premiers'. The seasons from 2001 to 2008, when the Tasmanian Devils were playing in the Victorian Football League and the local clubs played in regional competitions, there were no 'state premierships' contested.

== Controversial results ==
=== 1913 Tasmanian State Premiership ===
The 1913 State Premiership decider was awarded to Cananore on forfeit after Launceston objected to the central umpire engaged for the match and refused to play. The umpire in question, C. Dwyer, had umpired in the North vs South intrastate match earlier that year, and his performance had been criticised in the North. The off-field aftermath of the incident, which stretched for almost a year, resulted in a massive breakdown in diplomatic sporting relations between the North and the South. It began when the TFL imposed a suspension on the Launceston club and its players as penalty for its forfeiture. Due to the nature of affiliations between their associations, the TFL's suspensions were recognised by the Tasmanian Amateur Sports Federation – which included cricket, swimming, rowing, tennis, etc. and was affiliated with all of the equivalent mainland sporting bodies – which meant that no sporting body in Australia was permitted to stage or compete in an event featuring a banned Launceston footballer, or they themselves could face suspension. The North vs South cricket match on Boxing Day 1913, for example, was cancelled by the South because the North selected a Launceston footballer in its team. The NTFA, which supported Launceston's right to forfeit, refused to recognise the suspensions, and called off all intrastate fixtures with the South; Launceston continued to play in the 1914 NTFA season, and each other NTFA club earned its own suspension from the TFL when it played against Launceston – suspensions which were also duly ignored by the NTFA. Launceston's suspension was lifted in June 1914 after a begrudging truce was reached, in which both sides conceded "expressions of regret" and neither side extended an apology. By that stage, a farcical state of affairs existed under which many players, clubs and bodies had been issued suspensions by the TASF, and about half of the TASF's members had simply ended their affiliations to take themselves outside the influence of those suspensions.

=== 1967 Tasmanian State Premiership ===
The 1967 decider between Wynyard and North Hobart at West Park Oval in Burnie was declared a "no result" after a sensational finish to the match when Wynyard fans invaded the playing surface and tore the goal posts out of the ground to prevent North Hobart's David Collins from scoring the winning goal after the siren. Collins had remained on the field with the match ball tucked up his jumper waiting for umpires, players, team officials and police to clear the playing surface, but NTFA umpire Jack Pilgrim had already left the ground under police protection; after waiting for a lengthy period of time and with the crowd parading the posts around the ground, Collins also left the field.

== Finals ==
Year	Winner	Score	Runner-up	Attend.	Venue
1909	Cananore	6.10 (46) – 2.6 (18)	Launceston		NTCA Ground
1910	Cananore	7.14 (56) – 4.5 (29)	City	3,000	Upper Cricket Ground
1911	Cananore	16.18 (114) – 1.4 (10)	North Launceston		Upper Cricket Ground
1912	Lefroy	8.9 (57) – 4.10 (34)	North Launceston		Upper Cricket Ground
1913	Cananore	(Match cancelled) (Note: Cananore awarded the State Premiership after Launceston objected to umpire chosen for the match and refused to play)	Launceston		
1914	North Hobart	8.18 (66) – 4.9 (33)	City	5,000	Upper Cricket Ground
1920	North Hobart	7.8 (50) – 2.14 (26)	Launceston	5,000	NTCA Ground
1921	Cananore	13.14 (92) – 8.8 (56)	City	8,000	Upper Cricket Ground
1922	Cananore	28.22 (190) – 9.8 (62)	City		York Park
1923	North Hobart	20.13 (133) – 18.8 (116)	North Launceston	8,000	North Hobart Oval
1924	Lefroy	6.3 (39) – 5.5 (35)	Launceston	6,000	York Park
1925	Cananore	20.17 (137) 9.12 (66)	North Launceston	6,000	North Hobart Oval
1926	Cananore	7.10 (52) 5.20 (50)	Launceston		York Park
1927	Cananore	12.20 (92) – 10.15 (75)	North Launceston	5,700	North Hobart Oval
1928	City	9.10 (64) – 3.14 (32)	North Hobart		York Park
1929	North Hobart	11.12 (78) – 9.15 (69)	Launceston	6,000	North Hobart Oval
1930	City	14.10 (94) – 5.6 (36)	Lefroy		York Park
1931	Cananore	7.7 (49) – 7.6 (48)	North Launceston	3,070	North Hobart Oval
1932	City	7.14 (56) – 7.8 (50)	North Hobart		York Park
1933	Launceston	13.16 (94) – 12.13 (85)	Cananore	5,860	North Hobart Oval
1934	Launceston	8.11 (59) – 5.12 (42)	North Hobart		York Park
1935	Launceston	15.17 (107) – 6.6 (42)	New Town	5,253	North Hobart Oval
1936	North Hobart	9.7 (61) – 6.8 (44)	Launceston		York Park
1937	Launceston	16.9 (105) – 12.12 (84)	Lefroy		North Hobart Oval
1938	Launceston	16.9 (105) – 5.9 (39)	North Hobart		York Park
1939	North Hobart	13.13 (91) – 12.13 (85)	City	5,800	North Hobart Oval
1940	North Hobart	16.20 (116) – 9.6 (60)	Launceston		York Park
1941	North Hobart	13.18 (96) – 12.19 (91)	City	3,960	North Hobart Oval
1945	North Hobart	12.12 (84) – 11.11 (77)	Launceston	5,000	York Park
1946	Sandy Bay	13.13 (91) – 12.13 (85)	North Launceston	7,852	North Hobart Oval
1947	North Launceston	19.16 (130) – 10.9 (69)	North Hobart	7,500	York Park
1948	New Town	16.9 (105) – 16.7 (103)	North Launceston	8,387	North Hobart Oval
1949	North Launceston	13.17 (95) – 8.7 (55)	New Town	8,407	York Park
1950	North Launceston	14.9 (93) – 8.10 (58)	v Hobart	10,006	North Hobart Oval
1954	City	9.16 (70) – 6.10 (46)	Hobart	6,951	York Park
1955	Ulverstone	19.12 (126) – 12.13 (85)	Longford	11,000	York Park
1956	New Town	10.10 (70) – 8.10 (58)	City	7,350	North Hobart Oval
1957	Longford	14.16 (100) – 12.7 (79)	North Hobart	12,546	York Park
1958	Glenorchy	7.11 (53) – 6.11 (47)	Burnie Tigers	8,873	Devonport Oval
1959	Hobart	14.11 (95) – 9.14 (68)	Burnie Tigers	13,223	North Hobart Oval
1960	City-South	15.17 (107) – 12.17 (89)	Burnie Tigers	9,986	York Park
1961	North Hobart	13.8 (86) – 8.10 (58)	Cooee	8,000	West Park Oval
1962	North Hobart	11.10 (76) – 9.10 (64)	Burnie Tigers	7,640	North Hobart Oval
1963	Burnie Tigers	8.25 (73) – 6.13 (49)	North Launceston	6,490	York Park
1964	Cooee	15.16 (106) – 14.14 (98)	Scottsdale	9,700	West Park Oval
1965	Glenorchy	11.16 (82) – 9.8 (62)	Scottsdale	13,762	North Hobart Oval
1966	City-South	10.15 (75) – 9.13 (67)	Hobart	8,652	York Park
1967	No result (pitch invasion); Wynyard led 13.14 (92) – 12.19 (91) against North Hobart			8,289	West Park
1968	New Norfolk	9.13 (67) – 7.12 (54)	Scottsdale	11,395	North Hobart Oval
1969	North Hobart	26.20 (176) – 6.13 (49)	Launceston	10,371	York Park
1970	Latrobe	15.10 (100) – 9.11 (65)	Clarence	9,778	Devonport Oval
1971	Sandy Bay	12.14 (86) – 8.17 (65)	Latrobe	11,629	North Hobart Oval
1972	City-South	14.14 (98) – 8.14 (62)	Latrobe	10,551	York Park
1973	Scottsdale	16.20 (116) – 15.13 (103)	Cooee	8,269	West Park
1975	Glenorchy	18.24 (132) – 16.12 (108)	North Launceston	8,654	North Hobart Oval
1976	Ulverstone	17.19 (121) – 10.14 (74)	Launceston	6,827	York Park
1978	Cooee	19.25 (139) – 16.17 (113)	Sandy Bay	3,860	West Park Oval

=== Unofficial State Premiership Matches ===
The match was an official part of the Tasmanian football calendar between 1909 and 1978 but unofficial matches took place in 1904, 1905, 1906, 1952 and 1953.
There was no decider of any description in 1907, 1908, 1951, 1974 or 1977.

Year	Winner	Score	Runner-up	Attend.	Venue
1904	Wellington	4.16 (40) – 3.5 (23)	North Launceston	—N/a	NTCA Ground
1905	North Launceston	4.8 (32) – 3.10 (28)	North Hobart	2,000	NTCA Ground
1906	North Launceston	6.25 (61) – 4.10 (34)	North Hobart	—N/a	NTCA Ground
1952	City	11.14 (80) – 11.10 (76)	Sandy Bay	5,738	York Park
1953	New Town	9.15 (69) – 8.9 (57)	City	4,833	North Hobart Oval

=== Northern 'State' Premiership Matches ===
The two northern Tasmanian competitions, the NTFA and NWFU, wished to continue the State series in the 1974 and 1977 seasons. They determined to conduct a Northern 'State' Premiership match at the conclusion of their regional finals series. In 1974 City-South (NTFA) defeated Burnie (NWFU) at York Park in Launceston. In 1977 Penguin (NWFU) defeated Scottsdale (NTFA) at West Park in Burnie to become the respective Northern 'State' Premiers.

Year	Winner	Score	Runner-up	Attend.	Venue
1974	City-South	15.8 (98) – 8.10 (58)	Burnie	3,000	York Park, Launceston
1977	Penguin	16.18 (114) – 9.12 (66)	Scottsdale	3,000	West Park, Burnie

== Titles by club ==
Club	Premiers	Winning years
North Hobart	12	1914, 1920, 1923, 1929, 1936, 1939, 1940, 1941, 1945, 1961, 1962, 1969
Cananore	9	1909, 1910, 1911, 1921, 1922, 1925, 1926, 1927, 1931
City / City-South	7	1928, 1930, 1932, 1954, 1960, 1966, 1972
Glenorchy	3	1958, 1965, 1975
North Launceston	3	1947, 1949, 1950
Cooee	2	1964, 1978

== See also ==
- West Australian State Premiership, a similar competition held from 1903 to 1924 in Western Australia
