= Jock O'Brien (footballer, born 1937) =

Australian rules footballer (1937–2022)

Personal information
- Full name: John Francis O'Brien
- Born: 19 September 1937
- Died: 10 May 2022 (aged 84)
- Original team: Ballarat
- Height: 177 cm (5 ft 10 in)
- Weight: 80 kg (176 lb)

Playing career^{1}
Years	Club	Games (Goals)
1959–1961	North Melbourne	33 (0)
1964	Central District	19 (0)
- ^{1} Playing statistics correct to the end of 1964.

John Francis O'Brien (19 September 1937 – 10 May 2022) was an Australian rules footballer who played with North Melbourne in the Victorian Football League (VFL).

O'Brien, a centreman, made 16 appearances for North Melbourne in the 1959 VFL season and played a further 10 games in 1960. He spent most of the 1961 season in the reserves and won the Gardiner Medal.

After leaving North Melbourne, O'Brien played for North West Football Union (NWFU) club Ulverstone before transferring to Central District Football Club, taking part in their inaugural South Australian National Football League (SANFL) season in 1964.
