= CHFA =

CHFA may refer to:

- California Housing Finance Agency
- CHFA-FM, a radio station (90.1 FM) licensed to Edmonton, Alberta, Canada
- Circular Head Football Association, an amateur Australian rules football competition in north-western Tasmania.
