= Kerry Rattray =

Australian rules footballer

Personal information
- Full name: Kerry Rattray
- Born: 13 July 1944 (age 82)
- Original team: Penguin
- Height: 183 cm (6 ft 0 in)
- Weight: 78 kg (172 lb)

Playing career^{1}
Years	Club	Games (Goals)
1962–66	Melbourne	23 (13)
- ^{1} Playing statistics correct to the end of 1966.

Kerry Rattray (born 13 July 1944) is a former Australian rules footballer who played with Melbourne in the Victorian Football League (VFL).
