= Devonport Football Club =

Devonport

Names
- Full name: Devonport Football Club
- Nickname: Magpies
- Former nickname(s): Blues, Power
- Club song: "Good old Devonport forever!"

2024 (NWFL) season
- After finals: 1st
- Home-and-away season: 1st
- Leading goalkicker: Kai Cameron (52)

Club details
- Founded: 1881
- Colours
- Competition: NWFL
- President: Brendon Clark
- Coach: Kurt Byard
- Premierships: TFL (1): 1988; NWFU (7): 1914; 1915; 1925; 1934; 1936; 1938; 1981; NWFL (4): 2021; 2022; 2023; 2024
- Ground: Devonport Oval (capacity: 14,000)

Uniforms
| Home | Away |

Devonport Football Club is an Australian rules football club based in Devonport, Tasmania. The club currently competes in the North West Football League (NWFL). The club previously competed in the Northern Tasmanian Football League, but from 2009 it joined the newly reformed Tasmanian State League, where it played until withdrawing before the 2018 season.

== History ==
=== Northern Tasmanian Football League ===
The collapse of statewide football in late 2000 saw Devonport revert to a regional competition, in this case the Northern Tasmanian Football League (NTFL), but with only 9 wins from 20 matches for the year the club finished 8th (out of 12), a result it failed to improve on in 2002.

In 2003, however, the Magpies surged up the ladder to qualify for the finals, while the next year they went within one game – albeit a game in which they were conclusively vanquished by Burnie – of a flag. The 2005 season brought another grand final appearance, and another loss to Burnie, albeit this time by the comparatively more respectable margin of just 17 points. Then, in 2006, hopes that it might be third time lucky were conclusively dashed on grand final day by a much more talented and cohesive Launceston side, which ultimately won with ease by 57 points. The 2007 season brought a marginal decline in fortunes as the Magpies, having topped the ladder prior to the finals, bowed out of flag contention in straight sets after defeats by eventual premiers Launceston in the second semi final, and Ulverstone in the preliminary final. Kurt Heazlewood's Baldock Medal victory as the competition's best and fairest player provided a small measure of consolation.

=== Move to Tasmanian State League ===
The Devonport Football Club accepted an invitation to join the new Tasmanian State League in 2009. After a meeting of club members, delegates and supporters, the club unanimously voted to leave the NTFL and join the new league. The club began their foray back into Statewide football with distinction in their first two seasons, with a first semi final loss to eventual premier Clarence in 2009 and a surprise Grand Final appearance the following season, again meeting Clarence at Bellerive Oval, but there was to be no fairytale as the Coastal Magpies were swept aside by the reigning premier by 57 points.

=== Financial ruin ===
Just three months after competing in a Grand Final, financial disaster was to beset the club, on 10 December 2010 the Devonport Football Club was to announce that they were facing a debt of $507,525 and faced impending collapse should a white knight not be found. AFL Tasmania's CEO Scott Wade announcing that the club had fourteen days to prove to the sport's governing body that they were able to put plans in place to reduce the debt or they would face immediate expulsion from the Tasmanian State League for poor financial management. The NTFL stating that they would not let Devonport Football Club back into their competition should this eventuate and cross-town rival East Devonport refusing to enter into amalgamation talks with the club would most likely see the club go into extinction. The club is no stranger to financial turmoil, having been in trouble for most of the previous twenty years stemming back to their appointment of former Hawthorn legend Peter Knights as senior coach in 1990. By 1998 Devonport were close to extinction with a debt of $709,067 and were only saved by an approximately $246,000 loan from the Devonport Council in order to pay off some of their creditors. Urban legend amongst football writers and punters on the North West Coast was that the club were well known to have been in almost a quarter of a million dollars debt when they joined the TSL in late 2008, but the full extent of the financial problems were not known by AFL Tasmania until the sport's governing body appointed an independent administrator to oversee the running of the club in late 2010 whereby the extent of the financial problems were fully disclosed as Devonport Council also called in their loan to the club at the same time. After a change of board of directors, the club were granted donations of approximately $200,000 by a number of North Western businessmen and other supporters in the community and as such, were granted permission to remain a member of the Tasmanian State League.

=== 2011 and onwards ===
After being runners up to Clarence in the State League Final in 2010, there was an exodus of players at club while the coaching panel was being decided for 2011. Errol Bourn was appointed head coach after a long process but resigned for personal reasons leaving the Magpies without a coach and players leaving. The Board then appointed former Ulverstone Under 19 Premiership Winning Coach Glen Lutwyche to the role. Due to the dire financial state of the club the board resigned in December following revelations the club was more than $500,000 in debt, with a $103,000 rescue package to meet immediate liabilities contingent on the majority of the board resigning, apart from directors Shane Yates, Shane Lee and Leon Perry. On 4 February, a special general meeting was called to introduce the new directors to the members and playing group. The new directors endorsed include multiple world champion woodchopper David Foster, former assistant coach Mark Fagan, former East Devonport Football Club president Peter Mitchell, former players Pat Fagan and Barry Duckett, supporter Peter McConnon, and marketing consultant Trudi Jones. Shane Yates was confirmed as the new president at this meeting. The playing group was left battered by the player exodus which included star midfielder Kurt Heazlewood moving to WA for work and forward Ben Reynolds signing at Glenorchy. The club has started to put back together there playing list by signing Ulverstone pair Justin Rodman and Tim Mee.

After the departure of Glen Lutwyche as coach, the DFC brought in Paul Griffths to lead the team in 2013. After what some had described as a big pre season for the Magpies with an improved list and developing youngsters, Griffths' reign only lasted 5 games before he resigned. Griffths had only coached the team to a memorable ANZAC day clash win over eventual preliminary finalists Launceston in round three before he suddenly resigned after a big loss to South Launceston in round five. This brought under 18s coach Max Brown to the role of Senior coach where he set upon building the list and getting games in younger players. This strategy would come at a price with the Magpies only winning one more game for the rest of the year. Browns young team did show signs of improvement and with these good signs, Brown signed on to coach in 2014. Klay Griffths won his first Lance Cox Medal ahead of Quade Byard and Bodie Murphy won his first Noël Hetherington Memorial ahead of highly touted youngster Benjamin Hawkes.

Season 2014 has seen many new faces arrive at the club. Brayden Butler, Brayden Stevenson and Matthew Sheehan from Latrobe, Callen Newman from East Devonport and Scott Jaffery from Wesley Vale have all signed on for season 2014. The club also welcome back Brad Symmons and Corey Plumbridge from injury and retirement. The club lost Justin Rodman and Jack Vanderfeen to Ulverstone, Brennan Kendal to Queensland and Quade Byard to a knee injury.

=== Return to NWFL ===
In 2018, the club withdrew from the Tasmanian State League.

== Summary ==
- Stadium: Devonport Oval – 1937–present.
- Club formed – 6 March 1890
- Colours – Black and white.
- Emblem – Magpies (Blues from 1987 to 1996 and Power from 1997 to 2000)

== Statistics ==
- Record home roster match attendance – TFL Statewide League

4,046 – Devonport v Burnie Hawks – 25 April 1989 at Devonport Oval

- Record finals attendance – TFL Statewide League

17,878 – Devonport v Glenorchy – 1988 TFL Grand Final at North Hobart Oval

- Record home attendance – Tasmanian State League

Not available

- Record finals attendance – Tasmanian State League

6,123 – Clarence v Devonport – 18 September 2010 at Bellerive Oval

- Club record score

37.9 (231) v Launceston 10.6 (66) – 21 July 1996 at Devonport Oval

- Club record quarter

14.4 (88) v New Norfolk – 16 April 1988 at Devonport Oval

- Club record games holder
  - 247* Alan Clements

== Honours ==
=== Club ===
- Tasmanian Football League
  - Premiers (1): 1988
  - Runners-up (1): 2010
- North West Football Union (7): 1914, 1915, 1925, 1934, 1936, 1938, 1981
- North West Football League (3): 2021, 2022, 2023, 2024, 2025

=== Individual ===
- William Leitch Medallists
  - 1987 – David Code
  - 1997 – Fabian Carelli
  - 1998 – Wayne Weidemann
- Tassie Medallists
  - 2009 – Kurt Heazlewood
- Darrel Baldock Medallists
  - 2007 – Kurt Heazlewood
- Cheel Medallists (NWFU best and fairest player from 1923 to 1929)
  - 1925 – W. Berryman
- Royal Medallists (NWFU East best and fairest player in 1930)
  - 1930 – W. Berryman
- Wander Medallists (NWFU best and fairest player from 1948 to 1986)
  - 1974 – Cec Rheinberger
  - 1976 – K. Coates
  - 1978 – Jim Prentice
- Lefroy Medal (Best on ground for Tasmania in representative games)
  - 2010 – Ben Reynolds
- TFL Statewide League leading goalkicker
  - 1988 – Chris Reynolds (111)
  - 1998 – Ken Rainsford (94)
- NTFL leading goalkickers
  - 2002 – Matthew Langmaid (88)
  - 2003 – Matthew Langmaid (88)
  - 2007 – Phillip Crowden (111)
- NWFU leading goalkickers
  - 1914 – G. Foley (28)
  - 1924 – P. Martyn (34)
  - 1936 – A. Cooke (77)

== Past senior coaches ==
  - 1890 – J. Jones
  - 1891 – R. Langworthy
  - 1892–1899 – T. Wingrove
  - 1900 – Club in recess
  - 1901–1905 – J. Savage
  - 1906–1908 – S. Ashley
  - 1909–1910 – Unknown
  - 1911 – W. Pearce
  - 1912 – A. Knox
  - 1913 – A. Hennigan
  - 1914 – C. Hardstaff
  - 1915 – E. Hatton
  - 1916–1919 – Break due to World War I
  - 1920 – T. Lindley
  - 1921 – A. E. Hatton
  - 1922 – J. Foley
  - 1923 – J. Heaney
  - 1924–1926 – Percy Martyn
  - 1927 – J. Dunn
  - 1928 – J. Brown
  - 1929 – A. Soden
  - 1930 – Bill Berryman
  - 1931 – R. Mather
  - 1931–1935 – H. Baker
  - 1936 – C. A. Eyles
  - 1936 – M. Baker
  - 1937 – G. Bourke
  - 1937 – A. Brown
  - 1938–1939 – G. Cole
  - 1940 – C. Milburne
  - 1941–1944 – Break due to World War II
  - 1945 – P. Schmidt
  - 1946 – J. O'Keefe
  - 1947 – J. Jordan
  - 1948 – H. Murray
  - 1949 – A. Hutton
  - 1950–1951 – N. Richardson
  - 1952–1953 – R. Witzerman
  - 1954 – A. Deaton
  - 1955 – R. Cullen
  - 1956 – N. Gelavis
  - 1957–1958 – R. Jobson
  - 1959–1963 – Neil Conlan
  - 1964–1965 – Jervis Stokes
  - 1965–1967 – Peter Lyon
  - 1968–1969 – T. McKay
  - 1970–1971 – Geoff Martin
  - 1972–1973 – Roland Crosby
  - 1974 – C. Hutchins
  - 1975–1976 – Bob Withers
  - 1976 – G. A. Green
  - 1977 – J. Bates
  - 1978 – Jim Prentice
  - 1979–1984 – N. Johnson
  - 1985 – B. S. Lane
  - 1986 – Mark Williams
  - 1987–1989 – Roland Crosby
  - 1990–1993 – Peter Knights
  - 1994–1996 – Andy Goodwin
  - 1997–1998 – M. Brown
  - 1999 – R. Spencer
  - 2000–2007 – D. Perry
  - 2008 – Steve Reissig
  - 2009–2010 – Errol Bourn
  - 2011–2012 – Glen Lutwyche
  - 2013 – Paul Griffths / Max Brown
  - 2014 – Max Brown
  - 2015–2017 – Mitch Thorp

== Lance Cox Medal ==
In 2012 the Devonport Football Club named its best and fairest award after club stalwart Lance Cox. These are the following best and fairest winners since the TSL started in 2009:

- 2009 – C. Hardy
- 2010 – K. Heazlewood
- 2011 – J.Rodman

Lance Cox Medalists

- 2012 – J.Soden
- 2013 – K.Griffths
- 2014 – K.Pitchford

In 2012 the Devonport Football Club named its colts best and fairest after Noel Hetherington. The following winners have been:

- 2012 – Matthew Damon and Ashley O'Donnell
- 2013 – Bodie Murphy

== VFL/AFL players ==
Notable players that went on the play in the VFL/AFL:

- Grant Birchall (Hawthorn, Brisbane Lions)
- Ben Brown (North Melbourne, Melbourne)
- Brady Rawlings (North Melbourne)
- Jade Rawlings (Hawthorn, Western Bulldogs, North Melbourne)
- Matthew Richardson (Richmond)
- Ben Harrison (Carlton, Richmond, Western Bulldogs)
- Dion Scott (Sydney, Brisbane Bears, Brisbane Lions)
- Matthew Febey (Melbourne)
- Steven Febey (Melbourne)
