= John Jillard =

Australian rules footballer

Personal information
- Born: 28 March 1941
- Died: 28 December 1998 (aged 57)
- Original team: Footscray Juniors
- Height: 183 cm (6 ft 0 in)
- Weight: 81 kg (179 lb)

Playing career^{1}
Years	Club	Games (Goals)
1958–1970	Footscray	189 (1)

Representative team honours
Years	Team	Games (Goals)
	Victoria	2
- ^{1} Playing statistics correct to the end of 1970.

Career highlights
- Charles Sutton Medal: 1967; Western Bulldogs Team of the Century half-back flank; 2x Wander Medallist: (1970, 1971)

John Jillard (28 March 1941 – 28 December 1998) was an Australian rules footballer who played for the Footscray Football Club in the Victorian Football League (VFL) and Latrobe Football Club in the North West Football Union (NWFU). He was a half back flanker and won the Charles Sutton Medal for Footscray's Best and Fairest in 1967. In the same year he finished 10th in the Brownlow Medal count, having placed 8th two years earlier.

In 2002 he was named in Footscray's official 'Team of the Century' and inducted into the club hall of fame in 2014.

He also played for Latrobe and Ainslie.
