= Circular Head Football Club =

Australian rules football team

Circular Head Saints

Names
- Full name: Circular Head Football Club
- Former name(s): Smithton Football Club
- Nickname(s): Saints
- Former nickname(s): Giants

2023 season
- After finals: 7th
- Home-and-away season: 7th
- Leading goalkicker: Cameron Johns (11)

Club details
- Founded: 1919; 106 years ago
- Colours
- Competition: NTFL/NWFL (1987-present)
- Premierships: Circular Head FA (18): 1925; 1929; 1949; 1952; 1954; 1955; 1956; 1968; 1959; 1960; 1962; 1963; 1964; 1966; 1967; 1968; 1971; 1978; NWFU (1): 1983; NWFL (1): 1991
- Ground(s): Smithton Football Ground

Uniforms
Home	Away

Circular Head Football Club is an Australian rules football team that plays in the North West Football League, as the Circular Head Saints, based in the town of Smithton. Known throughout most of its history as the Smithton Saints, the club competed in the North West Football Union in two different stints, from 1949 to 1951 and then 1980 to 1986, then in the NWFL since 1987. It adopted the colours and nickname of Greater Western Sydney, becoming the Circular Head Giants from 2015 to 2019. In February 2019, the club went into recess due to a lack of player numbers, and folded in October of that year. It then reformed, and rejoined the NWFL from 2022, now adopting the name Circular Head Saints.

== History ==
=== Leagues ===
The club has participated in several Australian leagues, such as:

- CHFA (1919–49, 1952–79)
- NWFU (1950–51, 1980–86)
- NTFL/NWFL (1987–2019, 2022–)

=== Identity ===
The Smithton Football Club participated in the C.H.F.A. competition as the 'Magpies', wearing a jumper similar to that of the Collingwood Football Club. The Smithton Saints colours (red, white and black) and jumper design (similar to that of the St Kilda Football Club and almost identical to the jumper worn by the Forest-Stanley Under-17s prior to the two senior clubs, Forest and Stanley, merging) were instituted when for the very first time, a team from Circular Head was admitted to the N.W.F.U. in 1980. Three teams from Circular Head, Smithton (1949), Stanley (1950) and Forest (1951) participated in the N.W.F.U. finals from 1949 to 1951. The finals system in place in the N.W.F.U. over these three seasons involved the top 5 from the N.W.F.U. plus the C.H.F.A. Premiers for that season. In North Western Tasmanian football in seasons 1947 and 1948, the C.H.F.A. Premiers (Stanley on each occasion) participated in a three-way tussle for the N.W. Coast Premiership with the respective winners of the N.W.F.U.'s Eastern and Western Divisions.

In 2016, the club was rebranded, still known formally as the Smithton Football Club, but changing its playing and trading name from the Smithton Saints to the Circular Head Giants. The Smithton board had many years of discussions to change the identity, in an attempt to return the club to being a power in the North-West. NWFL president Andrew Richardson said, "You hear that Smithton doesn't represent Circular Head – well, this gives everybody the opportunity to jump on board the club." The club adopted the charcoal, orange and white guernsey of the AFL's Greater Western Sydney Giants, replacing the club's traditional red, white and black guernsey.

On 14 April 2025 the club gained its first win in 2443 days, defeating East Devonport.

== Honours ==
=== Premierships ===
- CHFA (18): 1925, 1929, 1949, 1952, 1954, 1955, 1956, 1968, 1959, 1960, 1962, 1963, 1964, 1966, 1967, 1968, 1971, 1978.
- NWFU (1): 1983
- NTFL/NWFL (1): 1991

=== B&F League Medalists ===
Baldock Medallists (formerly Ovaltine & Wander Medal)

- 2016 - Matt Elliott
- 2011 - Clint Riley
- 1994 - Tony Crennan
- 1991 - Darren Denneman
- 1989 - Dean Tuson
- 1988 - Mark Thorp
- 1984 - John Korporshoek
- 1983 - Stephen Parsons

=== Records ===
Record Attendance

- ― 11,722 ― Smithton v Cooee ― 1983 NWFU Grand Final at West Park Oval
