= Robert Hickman (footballer) =

Australian rules footballer (1942–2019)

Personal information
- Full name: Robert John Hickman
- Born: 26 December 1942; Warragul, Victoria, Australia
- Died: 2 October 2019 (aged 76); Latrobe, Tasmania
- Original team: Warragul Industrials
- Height: 185 cm (6 ft 1 in)
- Weight: 86 kg (190 lb)

Playing career^{1}
Years	Club	Games (Goals)
1961–64	Richmond	18 (1)
- ^{1} Playing statistics correct to the end of 1964.

Robert John Hickman (26 December 1942 – 2 October 2019) was an Australian rules footballer who played with Richmond in the Victorian Football League.

== Career ==
In 1965 he moved to Tasmania to play for Latrobe Football Club. He was awarded the Wander Medal for the league's best and fairest player in 1966 and 1967.

== Death ==
Hickman died in Latrobe in 2019, aged 76.
