= Ian Stevenson (footballer) =

Australian rules footballer

Personal information
- Full name: Ian R. Stevenson
- Born: 23 September 1944 (age 82)
- Original teams: East Devonport, North Ballarat
- Height: 193 cm (6 ft 4 in)
- Weight: 97 kg (214 lb)
- Position: Ruckman

Playing career^{1}
| Years | Club | Games (Goals) |
| 1969–70 | Essendon | 10 (2) |
- ^{1} Playing statistics correct to the end of 1970.

Ian Stevenson (born 23 September 1944) is a former Australian rules footballer who played with Essendon in the Victorian Football League (VFL). After his Essendon stint, Stevenson returned to his two old sides, East Devonport and North Ballarat, as well as playing with Kingsville.
