= Ricky Watt =

Australian rules footballer

Personal information
- Born: 4 October 1946 (age 80)
- Original team: West Heidelberg
- Height: 183 cm (6 ft 0 in)
- Weight: 86 kg (190 lb)

Playing career^{1}
Years	Club	Games (Goals)
1963–1970	Collingwood	95 (17)
- ^{1} Playing statistics correct to the end of 1970.

Ricky Watt (born 4 October 1946) is a former Australian rules footballer who played with Collingwood in the Victorian Football League during the 1960s.

Watt started at Collingwood when he was aged just 16 but due to injuries managed just 17 games in his first four years at the club, including missing all of the 1965 season. He played his best football in 1969 when he represented Victoria at the Adelaide Carnival and earned All-Australian honours. Injuries continued to plague him and in 1972, after hurting his Achilles tendon, he left Collingwood for good and joined Victorian Football Association VFA club Coburg. He then became captain-coach of Penguin Football Club in Tasmania before playing with East Devonport, winning a best and fairest award at the latter in 1975 as well as a Wander Medal.
