= Circular Head Football Association =

Australian rules football competition

The Circular Head Football Association (CHFA) is an Australian rules football competition based in the Circular Head area of north-western Tasmania, Australia. The CHFA currently features four clubs from small communities in the region and is the second oldest regional competition in Tasmania.

== History ==
The CHFA was formed in 1900 as the West Wellington Football Association. The formation of the Smithton Football Club in 1918 prompted a reorganisation of football in the region, and the name of the competition was changed to the Circular Head Football Association in 1919. The original clubs in the West Wellington FA were Forest, Irishtown and Stanley and these three clubs and Smithton form the CHFA from 1919. During this period Irishtown won 10 premierships in a row, which is a Tasmanian record and the third longest premiership streak across Australia.

The competition remained stable and a two-year break was taken in 1942 and 1943 because of the second World War. Football resumed in 1944 with Irishtown defeating Smithton in the grand final that year. From 1947 to 1948, the CHFA was absorbed by an expansion of the North West Football Union but this ended in 1949. In 1951 Scotchtown and Marrawah joined the senior competition but they only lasted two seasons. However, as a merged entity they returned in 1962. The followed year Forest and Stanley merged to become the Forest/Stanley Football Club. Scotchtown dropped the "Marrawah" from its name after the 1975 season.

The departure of Smithton to the NWFU in 1980 prompted the promotion of Redpa, Trowutta and City from the reserve grade. Trowutta folded after the 1992 season and in 1996 they merged with City to form the Trowutta/City Football Club. The competition has remained more or less stable since then with Trowutta/City going into recess in 2010 for a year and permanently in 2015.

== Clubs ==
=== Locations ===
Locations of the CHFA clubs

=== Current ===
Club	Colours	Nickname	Home Ground	Former league	Est.	Years in CHFA	CHFA Premierships	
Club	Colours	Nickname	Home Ground	Former league	Est.	Years in CHFA	Total	Years
Forest-Stanley		Demons	Stanley Recreation Ground, Stanley	–	1963	1963-	19	1965, 1972, 1973, 1979, 1980, 1981, 1984, 1985, 1986, 1991, 1999, 2001, 2002, 2005, 2010, 2015, 2016, 2017, 2025
Irishtown		Canaries	Irishtown Sports Complex, Irishtown	–	1896	1900-1915, 1919-	41	1906, 1907, 1908, 1909, 1910, 1911, 1912, 1913, 1914, 1915, 1919, 1920, 1921, 1922, 1923, 1924, 1926, 1927, 1928, 1930, 1932, 1935, 1937, 1938, 1940, 1944, 1953, 1957, 1969, 1970, 1974, 1975, 1976, 1982, 1983, 1995, 1996, 2008, 2009, 2011, 2018
Redpa		Redlegs	Redpa Oval, Redpa	–	1964	1965-	16	1972, 1978, 1979, 1989, 1990, 1992, 1994, 2000, 2006, 2012, 2013, 2014, 2019, 2022, 2023, 2024
Scotchtown (Scotchtown-Marrawah 1959-75)		Tigers	Circular Head Recreation Ground, Smithton	–	1950	1951-1956, 1959-	5	1977, 1987, 1988, 2004, 2021

=== Former ===
Club	Colours	Nickname	Home Ground	Former league	Est.	Years in CHFA	CHFA Premierships		Fate
Club	Colours	Nickname	Home Ground	Former league	Est.	Years in CHFA	Total	Years	Fate
Alcomie						?-1937-?	1	1937	Folded
Broadmeadows						?-1932-?	1	1932	Folded
Christmas Hills						?-1928-?	0	-	Folded
City		Magpies	Circular Head Recreation Ground, Smithton	–		?-1995	1	1993	Merged with Trowutta to form Trowutta-City in 1996
Forest		Robins	Forest Sports Centre, Forest	–	1900	1900-1962	12	1901, 1902, 1904, 1905, 1918, 1931, 1933, 1934, 1939, 1945, 1950, 1951	Merged with Stanley to form Forest-Stanley in 1963
Marrawah		Coasters	Redpa Oval, Redpa	RFA	1900	1945-1961	3	1947, 1950, 1959	Merged with Scotchtown to form Scotchtown-Marrawah partway through 1961 season.
Mella						?-1934-39-?	4	1934, 1935, 1938, 1939	Folded
Mengha				–		1910, 1912, 1918-1922	0	-	Recess in 1911 and 1913-1917. Folded after 1922 season.
Methodists				–		?-1953-1954-?	0	-	Folded
Montagu	Dark with light sash and monogram			–		?-1953-?	2	1923, 1958	Folded
North Forest				–		1908-1909	0	-	Folded after 1909 season
Our Boys				–		1900	0	-	Folded
Ramblers				–		1914	0	-	Folded after 1914 season
Rocky Cape	Dark with lighter yoke		Rocky Cape Football Ground, Rocky Cape	TCFA	1898	1952-?	0	-	Folded
Smithton	(1931)(?-1979)	Magpies	Circular Head Recreation Ground, Smithton	–	1907	1907-1979	18	1925, 1929, 1949, 1952, 1954, 1955, 1956, 1958, 1959, 1960, 1962, 1963, 1964, 1966, 1967, 1968, 1971, 1978	Moved to North West FL in 1980
Stanley		Seagulls	Stanley Recreation Ground, Stanley	–	1900	1900-1913, 1915-1921, 1923-1962	8	1900, 1903, 1936, 1941, 1948, 1947, 1948, 1961	Merged with Forest to form Forest-Stanley in 1963
Trowutta	(1953-?)(1987)(?-1992)	Roos	Trowutta Oval, Trowutta	–	1953	1953-1992	5	1955, 1962, 1974, 1976, 1977	Entered recess after 1992 season. Merged with City to form Trowutta-City in 1996
Trowutta-City		Bulldogs	Trowutta Oval, Trowutta	–	1996	1996-2009, 2011-2014	4	1997, 1998, 2003, 2007	Entered recess in 2010, re-formed in 2011, folded after 2014 season

== Premiers ==
=== Seniors ===
West Wellington FA

- 1900 Stanley
- 1901 Forest
- 1902 Forest
- 1903 Stanley
- 1904 Forest
- 1905 Forest
- 1906 Irishtown
- 1907 Irishtown
- 1908 Irishtown
- 1909 Irishtown
- 1910 Irishtown
- 1911 Irishtown
- 1912 Irishtown
- 1913 Irishtown
- 1914 Irishtown
- 1915 Irishtown
- 1916 World War 1
- 1917 World War 1
- 1918 Forest

Circular Head FA

- 1919 Irishtown
- 1920 Irishtown
- 1921 Irishtown
- 1922 Irishtown
- 1923 Irishtown
- 1924 Irishtown
- 1925 Smithton
- 1926 Irishtown
- 1927 Irishtown
- 1928 Irishtown
- 1929 Smithton
- 1930 Irishtown
- 1931 Forest
- 1932 Irishtown
- 1933 Forest
- 1934 Forest
- 1935 Irishtown
- 1936 Stanley
- 1937 Irishtown
- 1938 Irishtown
- 1939 Forest
- 1940 Irishtown
- 1941 Stanley
- 1942 World War 2
- 1943 World War 2
- 1944 Irishtown
- 1945 Forest
- 1946 Stanley
- 1947 Stanley*
- 1948 Stanley*
- 1949 Smithton
- 1950 Forest
- 1951 Forest
- 1952 Smithton
- 1953 Irishtown
- 1954 Smithton
- 1955 Smithton
- 1956 Smithton
- 1957 Irishtown
- 1958 Smithton
- 1959 Smithton
- 1960 Smithton
- 1961 Stanley
- 1962 Smithton
- 1963 Smithton
- 1964 Smithton
- 1965 Forest/Stanley
- 1966 Smithton
- 1967 Smithton
- 1968 Smithton
- 1969 Irishtown
- 1970 Irishtown
- 1971 Smithton
- 1972 Forest/Stanley
- 1973 Forest/Stanley
- 1974 Irishtown
- 1975 Irishtown
- 1976 Irishtown
- 1977 Scotchtown
- 1978 Smithton
- 1979 Forest/Stanley
- 1980 Forest/Stanley
- 1981 Forest/Stanley
- 1982 Irishtown
- 1983 Irishtown
- 1984 Forest/Stanley
- 1985 Forest/Stanley
- 1986 Forest/Stanley
- 1987 Scotchtown
- 1988 Scotchtown
- 1989 Redpa
- 1990 Redpa
- 1991 Forest/Stanley
- 1992 Redpa
- 1993 City
- 1994 Redpa
- 1995 Irishtown
- 1996 Irishtown
- 1997 Trowutta/City
- 1998 Trowutta/City
- 1999 Forest/Stanley
- 2000 Redpa
- 2001 Forest/Stanley
- 2002 Forest/Stanley
- 2003 Trowutta/City
- 2004 Scotchtown
- 2005 Forest/Stanley
- 2006 Redpa
- 2007 Trowutta/City
- 2008 Irishtown
- 2009 Irishtown
- 2010 Forest/Stanley
- 2011 Irishtown
- 2012 Redpa
- 2013 Redpa
- 2014 Redpa
- 2015 Forest-Stanley
- 2016 Forest-Stanley
- 2017 Forest-Stanley
- 2018 Irishtown
- 2019 Redpa
- 2020 Competition in Recess Due to the COVID-19 Pandemic
- 2021 Scotchtown
- 2022 Redpa
- 2023 Redpa
- 2024 Redpa
- 2025 Forest-Stanley

* - As the Circular Head Division of the North West FU

=== Reserves ===
West Wellington FA

No competition prior to 1913

- 1913 Irishtown
- 1914 Unknown
- 1915 Irishtown
- 1916 World War 1
- 1917 World War 1
- 1918 None

Circular Head FA

- 1919 None
- 1920 None
- 1921 None
- 1922 None
- 1923 Montagu
- 1924 Irishtown
- 1925 Forest
- 1926 Smithton
- 1927 Smithton
- 1928 Forest
- 1929 Smithton
- 1930 Forest
- 1931 Forest
- 1932 Broadmeadows
- 1933 Smithton
- 1934 Mella
- 1935 Mella
- 1936 Irishtown
- 1937 Alcomie
- 1938 Mella
- 1939 Mella
- 1940 World War 2
- 1941 World War 2
- 1942 World War 2
- 1943 World War 2
- 1944 World War 2
- 1945 Forest
- 1946 Stanley
- 1947 Marrawah*
- 1948 Smithton*
- 1949 Smithton
- 1950 Marrawah
- 1951 Forest
- 1952 Smithton
- 1953 Smithton
- 1954 Scotchtown
- 1955 Trowutta
- 1956 Forest
- 1957 Irishtown
- 1958 Montagu
- 1959 Marrawah
- 1960 Scotchtown
- 1961 Smithton
- 1962 Trowutta
- 1963 Forest-Stanley
- 1964 Smithton
- 1965 Smithton
- 1966 Irishtown
- 1967 Smithton
- 1968 Smithton
- 1969 Irishtown
- 1970 Irishtown
- 1971 Smithton
- 1972 Redpa
- 1973 Forest/Stanley
- 1974 Trowutta
- 1975 Smithton
- 1976 Trowutta
- 1977 Trowutta
- 1978 Redpa
- 1979 Redpa
- 1980 No competition
- 1981 No competition
- 1982 No competition
- 1983 No competition
- 1984 No competition
- 1985 No competition
- 1986 No competition
- 1987 Scotchtown
- 1988 Scotchtown
- 1989 Scotchtown
- 1990 Scotchtown
- 1991 Scotchtown
- 1992 Forest/Stanley
- 1993 Scotchtown
- 1994 Scotchtown
- 1995 No competition
- 1996 Scotchtown
- 1997 Redpa
- 1998 Redpa
- 1999 Forest/Stanley
- 2000 Irishtown
- 2001 Scotchtown
- 2002
- 2003
- 2004
- 2005
- 2006
- 2007
- 2008
- 2009
- 2010
- 2011
- 2012
- 2013
- 2014
- 2015
- 2016
- 2017
- 2018 Irishtown
- 2019 Irishtown
- 2020 Competition in Recess Due to the COVID-19 Pandemic
- 2021 Redpa
- 2022 Forest/Stanley
- 2023 Redpa
- 2024 Forest/Stanley
- 2025 Forest/Stanley

== 2017 Ladder ==
Circular Head FA	Wins	Byes	Losses	Draws	For	Against	%	Pts	Final	Team	G	B	Pts	Team	G	B	Pts
Irishtown	11	0	1	0	1254	357	351.26%	44	Preliminary	Forest/Stanley	6	11	47	Scotchtown	6	7	43
Forest/Stanley	9	0	3	0	1043	517	201.74%	36	Grand	Forest/Stanley	8	7	55	Irishtown	3	10	28
Scotchtown	4	0	8	0	629	1073	58.62%	16									
Redpa	0	0	12	0	276	1255	21.99%	0									

== 2018 Ladder ==
Circular Head FA	Wins	Byes	Losses	Draws	For	Against	%	Pts	Final	Team	G	B	Pts	Team	G	B	Pts
Irishtown	13	0	2	0	1310	548	239.05%	52	Semi	Scotchtown	16	17	113	Redpa	4	1	25
Forest/Stanley	9	0	6	0	1415	736	192.26%	36	Semi	Irishtown	9	10	64	Forest/Stanley	3	4	22
Scotchtown	7	0	8	0	973	951	102.31%	28	Preliminary	Forest/Stanley	5	8	38	Scotchtown	3	9	27
Redpa	1	0	14	0	336	1799	18.68%	4	Grand	Irishtown	14	7	91	Forest/Stanley	8	6	54
