= Darrel Baldock =

Australian rules footballer, born 1938

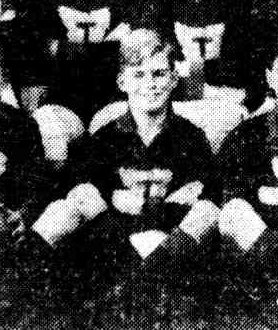

Member of the Tasmanian House of Assembly for Division of Wilmot
- In office 22 April 1972 – 30 June 1987

Personal details
- Born: Darrel John Baldock; 29 September 1938 Devonport, Tasmania
- Died: 2 February 2011 (aged 72) Latrobe, Tasmania
- Party: Labor (1972–1987)
- Nickname(s): The Doc, Mr Magic
Australian rules football career
Personal information
- Original teams: East Devonport (NWFU); Latrobe Football Club
- Height: 179 cm (5 ft 10 in)
- Weight: 84 kg (185 lb)
Playing career^{1}
Years	Club	Games (Goals)
1955–1958	East Devonport	71
1959–61, 1969–73	Latrobe	158
1962–1968	St Kilda	119 (237)
1974	New Norfolk	4 (0)
Total		352
Representative team honours
Years	Team	Games (Goals)
	Victoria	10
	Tasmania	15
Total		25
Coaching career^{3}
Years	Club	Games (W–L–D)
1987–1989	St Kilda	62 (18–44–0)
- ^{1} Playing statistics correct to the end of 1968.^{3} Coaching statistics correct as of 1989.
Career highlights
- Club: VFL Premiership player: 1966; St Kilda captain: 1963–1968; 3× St Kilda Best & Fairest: 1962, 1963, 1965; 4× St Kilda leading goalkicker: 1962, 1963, 1964, 1965; 2× Runner-Up Brownlow Medal: 1963, 1965; 4× NWFU Premiership player: 1969, 1970, 1971, 1972; 3× Wander Medallist: 1957, 1959, 1969; Latrobe captain-coach: 1969–1973; Honours: 2× All-Australian: 1961, 1966 – Captain; Australian Football Hall of Fame Legend; St Kilda Team of the Century, Captain; St Kilda Hall of Fame, Legend; Tasmanian Football Hall of Fame Icon; Tasmanian Team of the Century, Captain

Darrel John Baldock AM (29 September 1938 – 2 February 2011) was an Australian sportsman and state politician. He played Australian rules football for the St Kilda Football Club in the Victorian Football League (VFL), East Devonport Football Club and Latrobe Football Club in the North West Football Union (NWFU), and New Norfolk Football Club in the Tasmanian Australian National Football League (TANFL). He was also a handy cricketer, successful racehorse trainer and served in the Tasmanian House of Assembly.

Nicknamed "The Doc" and "Mr Magic", Baldock is a legend in the Australian Football Hall of Fame. He represented both Victoria and Tasmania in interstate matches, and captained St Kilda to its first premiership. He also served as senior coach of Latrobe and St Kilda.

== Early life ==
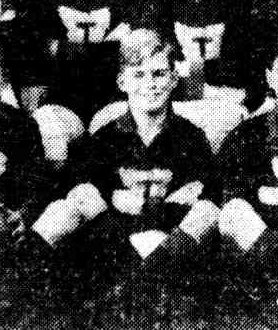
Baldock representing Tasmanian underage side in Brisbane in 1953

Born to Reginald Cecil Baldock and Jean Robertson Purdie, Baldock made his junior football debut for East Devonport in Tasmania's now defunct North-West Football Union in 1955 at the age of 16. He was selected in the NWFU team for intrastate matches and won the club best and fairest award that year. Even then, Baldock was already famous for his ball handling skills and balance. Baldock played 71 games for East Devonport before he switched to Latrobe in 1959. At the age of 20, Baldock became the youngest player ever to captain Tasmania.

== VFL career ==
A ready-made player, Baldock ventured across Bass Strait in 1962 to play for St Kilda in the Victorian Football League (VFL), where he had an instant impact. Baldock played at centre half-forward and was made captain of St Kilda's "Team of the Century" in 2002 and also named as the initial "legend" in the St Kilda Football Club Hall of Fame in 2003.

In 1969, Baldock returned to Tasmania and captain-coached Latrobe to four consecutive NWFU premierships from 1969 to 1972, and ultimately played 158 games for Latrobe. He then played four games for New Norfolk in 1974 before retiring to commence his parliamentary career.

== Other matches ==
Baldock also played six pre-season/night series matches for St Kilda, 25 matches in interstate football (10 for Victoria and 15 for Tasmania), and 20 matches for the North-West Football Union in intrastate football in Tasmania. If these are included, Baldock played a total of 403 senior career matches in Tasmania and Victoria.

Some sources list Baldock as playing 397 senior career matches, excluding his pre-season/night series matches for St Kilda.

== Political career ==
Baldock was one of four Australian Labor Party candidates elected to the Tasmanian House of Assembly on 22 April 1972 to represent the Division of Wilmot. Under Premier Bill Neilson, he was first appointed Minister for Housing and Social Welfare on 31 March 1975. He also served as Minister for Municipal Planning, Main Roads and Transport. Baldock resigned on 30 June 1987 to become coach of St Kilda.

== Coaching career ==
Prior to Baldock's return to Moorabbin in 1987, the Saints had finished the previous four VFL seasons at the bottom of the ladder. Just as during his playing days, Baldock's impact on the club was immediate. He set about improving the skill level of the playing group, appointed Danny Frawley as captain and guided the talented but wayward full-forward Tony Lockett to become the first footballer to win the Coleman Medal and the Brownlow Medal in the same year. But just when it looked like St Kilda might reach the finals, Baldock suffered a minor stroke. He continued to coach for a further two years.

== Family and later life ==
Baldock married Margaret Elizabeth Williams on 26 March 1960. Together they had three children – one son (who was killed in a car accident in 1981) and two daughters. After retiring, Baldock returned to Tasmania where he raced horses. His biography, Darrel Baldock – The Incomparable Mr Magic, was written by his friend Peter Lyons and published in June 2010. Baldock suffered from illness in his final years. He died at the Mersey Community Hospital in the early evening of 2 February 2011 of pneumonia and kidney failure following a fourth stroke.

A state funeral was held at Latrobe, Tasmania, on 11 February 2011. Those present included the St Kilda captain Nick Riewoldt, vice-captain Lenny Hayes, coach Ross Lyon, club president Greg Westaway, chief executive Michael Nettlefold and premiership teammate Kevin Neale. The AFL was represented by commissioner Graeme John, who had played against Baldock for South Melbourne.

== Honours ==
Baldock was inducted into the Australian Football Hall of Fame in its inception in 1996 (as a player) and was upgraded to Legend in 2006. In 2004, he was named on the half forward flank and as captain in the Tasmanian Team of The Century. Baldock was also honoured by having the Northern Tasmania Football League Best and Fairest medal named after him. To this day, the Darrel Baldock Medal is presented to the best and fairest senior player in the North West Football League.

On 26 January 1991, Baldock was named a Member of the Order of Australia in recognition of service to the Tasmanian parliament and to Australian rules football. On 24 October 2000, he was awarded the Australian Sports Medal for his contribution to Australian Football.

In April 2014, at the entrance of the Latrobe Recreation Ground, the Darrel Baldock Memorial, which included a larger-than-life statue of Baldock and a garden, was unveiled at a public ceremony with friends and family in attendance. The project was completed over three years and cost $400,000, drawn from both state and federal funding as well as corporate and community donations to a memorial fund.

== Sources ==
- Atkinson, G. (1982) Everything you ever wanted to know about Australian rules football but couldn't be bothered asking, The Five Mile Press: Melbourne. ISBN 0 86788 009 0.
