= John Bingley =

Australian rules footballer and coach (1940–2024)

Personal information
- Full name: John Alfred Bingley
- Born: 10 November 1940
- Died: 14 January 2024 (aged 83)
- Original team: East Devonport (NWFU)
- Height: 185 cm (6 ft 1 in)
- Weight: 83 kg (183 lb)

Playing career^{1}
| Years | Club | Games (Goals) |
| 1958–1961 | City-South | 101 () |
| 1962–1963 | East Devonport | 42 () |
| 1965–1966 | St Kilda | 8 (1) |
| 1967–1972 | Clarence | 128 () |
| Total | | 279 (1) |
- ^{1} Playing statistics correct to the end of 1966.

John Alfred Bingley (10 November 1940 – 14 January 2024) was an Australian rules footballer who played for St Kilda in the Victorian Football League.

== Early life and career in Tasmania ==
Born in Tasmania, Bingley began his senior football career with City-South in the Northern Tasmanian Football Association (NTFA) before transferring to East Devonport in the North West Football Union (NWFU).

== St Kilda ==
Bingley made his senior VFL debut for St Kilda in 1965 and despite playing only eight games he was a member of the Saints premiership winning side in 1966, with the Grand Final his last appearance.

== Return to Tasmania ==
In 1967 Bingley returned to Tasmania and appointed captain-coach of Tasmanian Football League (TFL) club Clarence. He led the club to the TFL premiership in 1970.

Bingley also kicked the winning goal for Tasmania in a 1970 match against Western Australia.

Bingley was inducted into the Tasmanian Football Hall of Fame in 2005.

== Death ==
Bingley died on 14 January 2024, at the age of 83. (Note: League records previously had Bingley's birth year as 1941, which was then erroneously quoted in some obituaries.)
