= Bill Berryman =

Australian rules footballer

Personal information
- Full name: William Edward Berryman
- Nickname: Bull
- Born: 14 November 1899; Zeehan, Tasmania
- Died: 11 January 1953 (aged 53); Wright Island off Devonport, Tasmania
- Original team: Devonport
- Height: 173 cm (5 ft 8 in)
- Weight: 80 kg (176 lb)
- Position: Defender

Playing career^{1}
| Years | Club | Games (Goals) |
| 1926–28 | South Melbourne | 47 (0) |
- ^{1} Playing statistics correct to the end of 1928.

William Edward "Bull" Berryman (14 November 1899 – 11 January 1953) was an Australian rules footballer who played for South Melbourne in the Victorian Football League (VFL) during the 1920s.

== Family ==
The eldest son of Edwin William Berryman (1873–1936), and Ada May Berryman (1880–1951), née Wilby, Edward William Berryman was born in Zeehan, Tasmania on 14 November 1899.

Berryman married Gladys Hazel Snooks (1900–1986) in August 1927.

== Football ==
=== Devonport (NWFU) ===
Berryman, a defender, started out at Devonport in the North West Football Union (NWFU) and won the Cheel Medal as the competition's 'best and fairest' player in 1925.

=== South Melbourne (VFL) ===
He played 47 senior games for South Melbourne over three years (1926–1928).

=== Rochester (BFL) ===
In 1929 he was cleared from South Melbourne, and was appointed captain-coach of Rochester Football Club in the Bendigo Football League.

=== Devonport (NWFU) ===
In 1930, he returned to Tasmania and continuing to play with Devonport.

In 1930, he tied for the Royal Medal/Turner Medal, donated by Mr. Charles James Turner of the Royal Hotel, Latrobe, that was awarded to the NFWU's best and fairest player, with Eric "Dick" Fleming of Deloraine. Unusually, two medals were awarded at the time (rather than retrospectively, many years later, as happened in similar circumstances in other competitions, at other locations).

Berryman spent the 1930 and 1931 NWFU seasons as captain-coach.

== Royal Humane Society of Australasia's Certificate of Merit ==
On several occasions Berryman saved men from drowning:

NARROW ESCAPE—
A member of a ship's crew had a narrow escape from drowning when he fell from the wharf into the Mersey late on Friday night.
His cries for help were heard by Mr. W. Berryman, who jumped 14 feet into the water.
He was thrown a small raft by the stevedore (Mr. T. Bound), and paddling this about 150 yards to the man, he succeeded in bringing him ashore.
The task was a difficult one, and only a man of strong physique could have accomplished it.
The rescuer was warmly complimented on his effort.

In November 1943, he was awarded a Certificate of Merit from the Royal Humane Society of Australasia for his bravery.

== Tasmanian Football Hall of Fame ==
For his contribution to football in the state, Berryman was inducted into the Tasmanian Football Hall of Fame in 2005.

== Death ==
A professional fisherman, Berryman died from drowning after an accident on a fishing trip in January 1953.

== See also ==
- 1927 Melbourne Carnival
