= Mike Andrews (footballer) =

Australian rules footballer (1946–2026)

Personal information
- Full name: Michael John Andrews
- Born: 17 January 1946
- Died: 28 April 2026 (aged 80)
- Original team: Wodonga
- Height: 1.83 m (6 ft 0 in)
- Weight: 86 kg (190 lb)

Playing career
Years	Club	Games (Goals)
1966–1972	Fitzroy	80 (13)

Michael John Andrews (17 January 1946 – 28 April 2026) was an Australian rules footballer who played with Fitzroy in the Victorian Football League (VFL) who debuted in round one, 1966.

Andrews was captain coach of Myrtleford Football Club between 1973 and 1975, then won the club best and fairest award and also the Ovens & Murray Football League best and fairest, Morris Medal in 1976.
