= Alex Ruscuklic =

Australian rules footballer

Personal information
- Born: 21 September 1948 (age 78); Bochum, Allied-occupied Germany
- Original team: Morwell (LVFL)
- Height: 191 cm (6 ft 3 in)
- Weight: 85 kg (187 lb)

Playing career^{1}
Years	Club	Games (Goals)
1966–1974	Fitzroy	108 (189)
1974	Carlton	9 (20)
Total		117 (209)
- ^{1} Playing statistics correct to the end of 1974.

Alex Ruscuklic (born 21 September 1948) is a former Australian rules footballer who played with Fitzroy and Carlton in the VFL.

German born Alex Ruscuklic was a forward and started his career with Fitzroy in 1966. He topped their goalkicking in 1970 with 49 goals. The following season he finished equal 5th in the Brownlow Medal count, the most by a Fitzroy player that year although he failed to win the club's best and fairest award. In 1971 he also finished first in the league for marks, with 216. His often spectacular aerial marking was the trademark of his game. At the start of the 1974 season Ruscuklic was suspended by the Fitzroy committee after a series of disagreements and he transferred to Carlton where he finished his VFL career. He is the elder brother of Peter Ruscuklic, another Fitzroy player.
