= Stan Trebilco =

Australian rules footballer

Personal information
- Full name: Stanley Duke Trebilcock
- Born: 24 December 1897; Gawler, near Ulverstone, Tasmania
- Died: 26 March 1976 (aged 78); Burnie, Tasmania
- Original team: Ulverstone

Playing career^{1}
Years	Club	Games (Goals)
1924–1925	Carlton	21 (10)
- ^{1} Playing statistics correct to the end of 1925.

Stanley Duke Trebilco (24 December 1897 – 26 March 1976) was an Australian rules footballer who played for Carlton in the Victorian Football League (VFL) during the 1920s.

Trebilco, who started out at Ulverstone, won the inaugural Cheel Medal in 1923. He then spent two seasons with Carlton and placed well in the Brownlow both years. The 1926 season saw him back in Tasmania, this time as captain-coach of Burnie.
