= Peter Ruscuklic =

Australian rules footballer

Personal information
- Full name: Peter (Petar) Ruscuklic
- Born: 15 December 1955
- Died: 2 May 2014 (aged 58)
- Original team: Macleod-Rosanna
- Height: 191 cm (6 ft 3 in)
- Weight: 92 kg (203 lb)
- Position: Full-forward

Playing career^{1}
Years	Club	Games (Goals)
1975–1976	Fitzroy	10 (20)
1977	Geelong	4 (1)
Total		14 (21)
- ^{1} Playing statistics correct to the end of 1977.

Peter Ruscuklic (15 December 1955 – 2 May 2014) was an Australian rules footballer who played for Fitzroy and Geelong in the Victorian Football League (VFL) during the 1970s.

Although his two years at Fitzroy were largely unsuccessful, Ruscuklic memorably kicked a bag of six goals in just his second league game, against North Melbourne at Arden Street. He spent his last VFL season with Geelong but could only manage four senior appearances.

Ruscuklic, the younger brother of fellow footballer Alex Ruscuklic, later made a name for himself in the Sydney Football League. Playing for East Sydney, Ruscuklic at one stage kicked 505 goals in three seasons, with a sequence of 136, 156 and 213 goals from 1979 to 1981. His tally of 213 goals remains a national record for a major Australian rules football league season and included a 24-goal haul against St George as well as ten goals in the Preliminary Final.

Ruscuklic also coached Myrtleford Football Club in the Ovens and Murray Football League and won the O&MFL goalkicking with 76 goals in 1983. Ruscuklic kicked 324 goals at Myrtelford between 1983 and 1986.

He died suddenly on 2 May 2014 at the age of 58.
