= Wynyard Football Club =

Wynyard

Names
- Full name: Wynyard Football Club
- Nickname(s): Cats
- Club song: "We're a happy team at Wynyard"

2022 season
- After finals: 2nd

Club details
- Founded: 1885; 140 years ago
- Colours
- Competition: North West Football League
- President: Kent Jackson
- Coach: Beau Sharman
- Ground(s): Wynyard Recreation Ground

Uniforms
Home

The Wynyard Football Club is an Australian rules football club based in Wynyard, Tasmania.

== Club history ==
The Wynyard Football Club was believed to be formed in 1885 as Table Cape and adopted the name of Wynyard in 1890.

The Wynyard Cats entered the North West Football Union (NWFU) in 1925 after playing in various competitions for the first four decades.

The Cats were involved with the infamous "Goalpost Final" against North Hobart at West Park Oval in 1967, which was declared a "no result" after hundreds of fans invaded the ground and tore down the goalposts as North Hobart full-forward David "Dickie" Collins went back to take a kick after the siren with Wynyard leading by one point.

In 1987, Wynyard joined the new Northern Tasmanian Football League (renamed the North West Football League in 2015), and has competed there since. Wynyard broke a 33-year premiership drought in 2012, with a 13-point Grand Final victory over Latrobe; and in 2014 they defeated Ulverstone by 116 points in the Grand Final to win a second premiership in three years. The following year, the Cats went “back to back” winning another senior premiership for the first time in 125 years.

== Club details ==
Home Ground:

- Wynyard Football Ground, Austin Street Wynyard, Tasmania.

Colours:

- Navy Blue with a white "WFC" Emblem

== Premiership titles ==
Senior Premierships (NWFU):

- 1952
- 1967
- 1975
- 1979

Senior Premierships (NTFL/NWFL):

- 2012
- 2014
- 2015

League Best and Fairest Winners (NWFU):

- 1930 - E O'Brien & Jack Stewart (Wright Medal)
- 1945 - Len Hayes
- 1953 - Darrell Eaton (Wander Medal)
- 1961 - Lloyd Robson (Wander Medal)
- 1977 - Ricky Smith (Wander Medal)

League Best and Fairest Winners (NTFL/NWFL):

- 1987 - Anthony Flint (Ovaltine Medal)
- 2012 - Sam Douglas (Darrel Baldock Medal)
- 2014 - Sam Douglas (Darrel Baldock Medal)
- 2015 - Zac Smith (Darrel Baldock Medal)
- 2017 - Dylan Smith (Darrel Baldock Medal)
- 2018 - Sam Douglas (Darrel Baldock Medal)
- 2022 - Kallum Kubicki (Darrel Baldock Medal)

Alstergen Trophy Winners:

- 1968 - John Neal
- 1976 - Ricky Smith

League Leading Goal Kickers (NWFU):

- 1949 - R Rocher (81)
- 1950 - R Rocher (69)
- 1953 - W Baker (45)
- 1955 - W Baker (39)
- 1959 - R London(68)
- 1963 - R London(51)
- 1967 - J Coughlan (81)
- 1968 - J Coughlan (92)
- 1974 - A Hodgetts (69)
- 1977 - K Madden(83)

League Leading Goal Kickers (NTFL/NWFL):

- 1987 - K Taylor (141)
- 1995 - G Williams (80)
- 1999 - G Williams (60)
- 2014 - G Sharman (130)
- 2015 - G Sharman (109)
- 2019 - G Sharman (58)

Notable Players:

- Colin Robertson
- Chris Bond
- Alistair Lynch
- Robert “Scratcher” Neal
- Simon Atkins
- Paul Atkins
- Joe Littler
