= East Devonport Football Club =

Australian football club

East Devonport

Names
- Full name: East Devonport Football Club
- Nickname(s): Swans
- Club song: "Onwards To Victory"

Club details
- Founded: 1901; 124 years ago
- Colours
- Competition: North West Football League
- Coach: Brenton Gale
- Captain(s): Daniel Baldock
- Ground(s): Girdlestone Park

Uniforms
Home	Away

The East Devonport Football Club is an Australian rules football club based on Devonport, Tasmania. The club had competed in the North West Football League since 1987.

== History ==
The club competed on an irregular basis in various non-senior North Western competitions between 1901 and 1944 before being promoted to senior status to participate in the North West Football Union from 1945 to 1986. In 1987 the club joined the Northern Tasmanian Football League (renamed the North West Football League in 2015), and has competed continuously in that competition until 2020. The club's senior arm (under-16s and older) was in recess from 2021 to 2024, with the club retaining a presence at junior level; is senior team returned in 2025.

Home Ground – Girdlestone Park
Established – 1901
Playing Colours – Red & White
Emblem – Swans
Club Theme Song – "Onwards To Victory" (Tune: "Notre Dame Victory March")
Affiliations – Various junior competitions (1901–1944) NWFU (1945–1986), NTFL/NWFL (1987–present)

== Premiership Titles ==
NWFU Premierships

- 1946, 1948, 1968.

NTFL/NWFL Premierships

- 1988.

Tasmanian State Premierships

- Nil.

== Individual Medal winners ==
Wander Medal winners

- 1952 (Australia) – Max Berryman
- 1957 (Australia) – Darrel Baldock
- 1960 (Australia) – Terry Pierce
- 1963 (Australia) – John Bingley
- 1975 (Australia) – Ricky Watt
- 1980 (Australia) – Lindsay Bell
- 1982 (Australia) – Richard Lynch
- 1985 (Australia) – Neville Muir
- 1986 (Australia) – Peter Borlini

Ovaltine Medal winners

- 1995 (Australia) – Paul Spencer

Pivot Medal winners

- 1998 (Australia) – Craig Muir

Darrel Baldock Medal winners

- 2002 (Australia) – Adrian Partridge

== Competition Leading Goalkickers ==
NWFU Leading Goalkickers

- 1954 (Australia) – Ray Summers (38)
- 1980 (Australia) – Chris Reynolds (95)
- 1981 (Australia) – Chris Reynolds (97)

NTFL/NWFL Leading Goalkickers

- 1988 (Australia) – Mark Williams (119)

== Club Records ==
Club Record Score

- 36.13 (229) v George Town 11.4 (70) in 1987

Club Record Games Holder

- (Australia) – Shane McCoy (263)

== Club Record Match Attendance ==
- 11,866 – East Devonport v Ulverstone at West Park Oval for the 1968 NWFU Grand Final.

== Notable players ==
- Graham Wright was drafted in the 1987 VFL draft to Collingwood Football Club and achieved premiership success in 1990.
- Darrel Baldock began his senior football career with the Swans before moving to Latrobe Football Club and then to St Kilda Football Club where he captained the team to their first premiership in 1966.
- Graeme Lee finished his football career at the East Devonport Football Club He played 127 games while captain coach of the club from 1968-1975
