= Longford Football Club =

Longford

Names
- Full name: Longford Football Club
- Nickname: Tigers

Club details
- Founded: 1878
- Colours: Black Yellow
- Competition: Northern Tasmanian Football Association.
- Premierships: 1890, 1891, 1892, 1893, 1894, 1895, 1896, 1897, 1898, 1899, 1901, 1904, 1906, 1921, 1924, 1955, 1957, 1958, 1989, 2022
- Ground: Longford Recreation Reserve, Smith St, Longford.

The Longford Football Club is an Australian rules football club based in Longford, Tasmania which currently compete in the modern Northern Tasmanian Football Association. From 1926 until 1986 they had played in the original Northern Tasmanian Football Association. Formed in 1887, Longford are nicknamed the Tigers and wear black and gold as their club colours.

== History ==
Longford Football Club was originally founded in 1887 as the South Esk Football Club by members of the South Esk Rowing Club, as reported by Launceston Examiner 9 April 1887 and Saturday Evening Express (Launceston) 31 July 1937.

The earlier Longford FC founded in 1878 had disbanded in 1884 after the Launceston FC and others demanded football be played strictly per the Victorian rules. The similarly named "Longford Juniors FC" in this period was an entirely separate entity. Over the 1903-04 period the South Esk FC name disappeared in favour of the Longford FC.

From 1926 until 1986 they had played in the original Northern Tasmanian Football Association. Longford has their strongest decade in the 1950s when they claimed three NTFA premierships, including their breakthrough triumph in 1955. They had previously never won the competition but had been runners-up in 1931, 1940 and 1953. In 1959 the club attempted to win their third premiership in a row but lost the Grand Final to City-South.

The Tigers were Tasmanian State Premiers in 1957. After accounting for Ulverstone, premiers of the North West Football Union, in the preliminary match, Longford defeated North Hobart by 21 points in the decider at York Park.

The club spent one unsuccessful year in the NTFL (1987) before realising that the football standard was too high for them so they transferred to the Tasmanian Amateurs where they remain to this day.

== Honours ==
=== Premierships ===
NTFA premierships

Original (3)

- 1955
- 1957–58

Current (1)

- 1989
- 2022

Tasmanian State Premierships (1)

- 1957

=== Medalists ===
Tasman Shields Trophy winners

- Len Gaffney 1926, 1927
- Leo Wescott 1930
- Lloyd Bennett 1940
- Terry Cashion 1948, 1950, 1951
- Charlie Dennis 1955
- John Fitzallen 1957
- Nigel Wilson 1965

Hec Smith Memorial Medalists

- Barry Lawrence 1966
- John Davis 1970
- David Berne 1974
- Malcolm Upston 1986

=== Team of the Century ===
In September 2001, the Longford named an official 'Team of the Century'.

Longford 'Team of the Century'
B:	David Berne	Don Brooks	Paul Vinar
HB:	Roly Chugg	Ike Hayes (vc)	Peter Jago
C:	Gus O'Brien	Terry Cashion	John Fitzallen
HF:	Stephen Theodore	Barry Lawrence	Jack Barnes
F:	Len Pitt	Michael Roach	John Smith
Foll:	Fred Davies (c)	Casey Lawrence	Lyndon Dakin
Int:	Colin Eyles, Alan Chugg	Jeff Heathcote, Garry Mahar	Colin Johnstone, Bob Cheek, Neil Kearney
Int:	Aub Jones, Mike Smart	Roger Hoggett, Geoff Frier	Bob Pitt, Tom Barwick, Damien Lavelle
Coach:	Fred Davies		
