= Latrobe Football Club =

Latrobe

Names
- Full name: Latrobe Football Club
- Nickname: Demons
- Club song: "It's a Grand Old Flag"

2025 season
- Home-and-away season: 6th

Club details
- Founded: June 19, 1881; 145 years ago
- Colours
- Competition: North West Football League (1st season: 1882)
- President: Darren Hawkins
- Coach: Daniel Freshney
- Premierships: 19 (1891, 1892, 1907, 1913, 1920, 1922, 1924, 1926, 1930, 1931, 1933, 1969, 1970, 1971, 1972, 2010, 2011, 2013, 2016 )
- Ground: Latrobe Recreation Ground (capacity: 9,000)

Uniforms
Home

The Latrobe Football Club is an Australian rules football club based in the town of Latrobe in northern Tasmania. The club competed in the North West Football Union throughout the competition's entire existence from 1910 until 1986, and has competed in its successor, the North West Football League, since 1987. Latrobe was one of the most successful NWFU clubs, and its tally of 12 premierships is a joint record shared with Burnie and Ulverstone. It was the only club to win four successive NWFU premierships, achieved from 1969 to 1972. In 2013, it became the first Tasmanian club outside of the State League to be inducted into the Tasmanian Football Hall of Fame.

== History ==
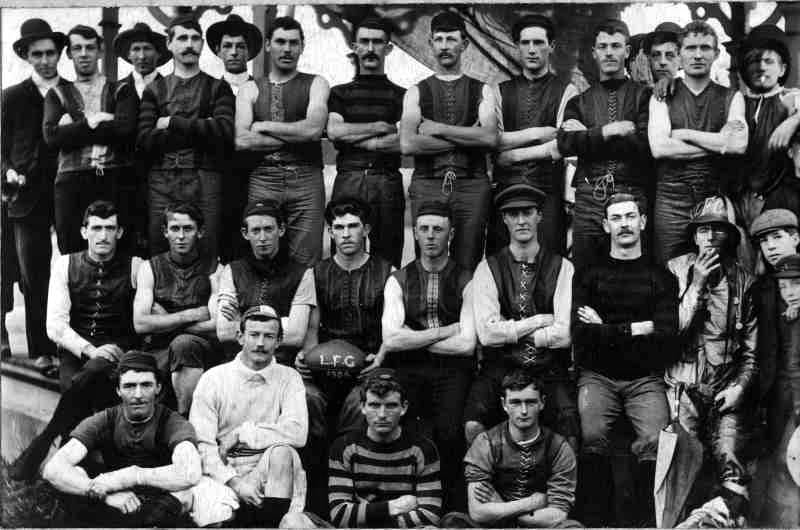
The Latrobe Football Club in 1904

During their time in the NWFU, Latrobe were known as the "Diehards" and had royal blue and red as their club colours. The club was formed on the 19 June 1881 and they played local football before joining the NWFA in 1894. They continued in the NWFA until 1908 where after a fallout with the NWFA executive they helped formed the NWFL in 1909. this turned into the NWFU IN 1910. They claimed premierships in 1891, 1892 in local competitions and a NWFA premiership in 1907.

In 1910, Latrobe were one of the foundation members of the NWFU and were premiers in just their fourth season. They had one of their strongest era in the 1920, appearing in every Grand Final from 1920 to 1924 and were to have a particularly successful team in the early 1930s winning three of the four premiership titles on offer between 1930 and 1933, only missing out in 1932 when they were losing Grand Finalists. The club had fielded two different teams in the 1931 season, Latrobe Country and Latrobe Town, to fill a spot vacated by Devonport's withdrawal, but merged again for the finals series.

After their 1933 success, the Diehards didn't win another NWFU premierships for 36 years, they began building a strong team in the 1960s, highlighted by the fact that every Wander Medal between 1964 and 1971 was won by a Latrobe player. This culminated in their drought breaking Grand Final win in 1969 under captain-coach Darrel Baldock, who then steered Latrobe to the next three premierships.

Latrobe won the Tasmanian State Premiership in 1970 when they defeated Clarence by 35 points at Devonport Oval. Latrobe also reached the Tasmanian State Premiership decider in 1971 and 1972 but lost to Sandy Bay and City-South respectively.

The 1972 premiership was Latrobe's last in the NWFU. The club competed in the NWFU until it merged with the NTFA to form the Northern Tasmanian Football League in 1987, and has competed in that competition (which was renamed the North West Football League in 2015) since. It won its first NTFL premiership in 2010, ending a 38-year premiership drought across both competitions, by defeating Ulverstone by 30 points in the NTFL Grand Final after having previously lost the 1994 and 2000 Grand Finals to Ulverstone on both occasions. It was the first of three premierships won over four years from 2010 until 2013.

== Club details ==
- Home ground – Darrel Baldock Oval (Latrobe Recreation Ground)
- Established – 19 June 1881
- Playing colours – Navy blue and red
- Emblem – Demons
- Club theme song – "It's a Grand Old Flag" (Tune: "You're a Grand Old Flag")
- Affiliations – NWFL (1882–1909) NWFU (1910–1986), NTFL/NWFL (1987–present)

== Premiership titles ==
NWFL Premierships

- 1891, 1892, 1907

NWFU Premierships

- 1913, 1920, 1922, 1924, 1926, 1930, 1931, 1933, 1969, 1970, 1971, 1972.

NTFL/NWFL Premierships

- 2010, 2011, 2013, 2016

Tasmanian State Premierships

- 1970.

== Individual medal winners ==
Wander Medal winners

- 1948 – Dave Jeffrey
- 1952 – Peter Gillam
- 1956 – Joe Murphy
- 1959 – Darrel Baldock
- 1964 – Wally Clark
- 1965 – Len Lawson
- 1966 – Bob Hickman
- 1967 – Bob Hickman
- 1968 – Brian Waters
- 1969 – Darrel Baldock
- 1970 – John Jillard
- 1971 – John Jillard

Ovaltine Medal winners

- Nil

Pivot Medal winners

- Nil

Darrel Baldock Medal winners

- 2009 – Gavin Woodcock
- 2013 - Josh Holland
- 2014 - Josh Holland (joint winner)

All Australian players

- 1961 - Darrel Baldock

== Competition leading goalkickers ==
NWFU leading goalkickers

- 1920 – H. Hicks (Not available)
- 1921 – H. Hicks (Not available)
- 1922 – H. Hicks (39)
- 1937 – N. Horne (71)
- 1938 – N. Horne (61)
- 1939 – N. Horne (84)
- 1954 – A. Cole (97)
- 1970 – R. (Ned) Gillam (83)
- 1986 – Tom Honner (85)

NTFL/NWFL leading goalkickers

- 1989 – Mark Williams (132)
- 1994 – Terry Keays (117)
- 2000 – S. French (42)
- 2011 - B. Deverall (77)
- 2012 - B. Deverall (106)
- 2013 - A.Jeffrey (67)
- 2016 - Ryan Keep (103)

== Club records ==
Club record score

- 38.22 (250) v Penguin 9.6 (60) in 2004

Club record games holder

- Rod Butler (324)

== Club record match attendance ==
- 11,329 – Latrobe v Sandy Bay at North Hobart Oval on 2 October 1971 for the Tasmanian State Premiership Final.
