= North West Football League =

Australian rules football competition

- Formerly: Northern Tasmania Football League (1987–2014)
- Sport: Australian rules football
- Founded: 1987; 39 years ago
- First season: 1987
- CEO: Morgan Hughes
- President: Andrew Richardson
- No. of teams: 8
- Country: Australia
- Most recent champion: Devonport
- Most titles: Ulverstone Robins (9 titles)
- Website: nwfl.com.au

The North West Football League (NWFL) is an Australian rules football competition in North West Tasmania. The league was previously known as the Northern Tasmanian Football League (NTFL) from its inception in 1987 until the end of the 2014 season.

== History ==
Throughout and after the 1986 season, greater northern Tasmania's two senior football competitions – the Launceston-based Northern Tasmanian Football Association (NTFA) and the north-western coast's North Western Football Union (NWFU) – each lost several clubs to the new TFL Statewide League in 1986. The NTFA had lost North Launceston, East Launceston and City-South: and the NWFU had lost Devonport and Cooee. As a result, the two leagues were wound up, and the Northern Tasmanian Football League was established in 1987 to feature all of the remaining clubs. The NTFL was considered a lower tier than the Statewide League, unlike its predecessors, which were of equal seniority.

After the collapse of the Statewide League at the end of 2000, the northern and coastal clubs from that competition returned to the NTFL and dominated the competition for the next eight years (Burnie and Launceston won the next eight premierships between them). With the revival of the Statewide League in 2009, the same five clubs left the NTFL again (North Launceston, South Launceston, Launceston, Burnie and Devonport), resulting in the contraction of the league to a six-club coastal composition.

In the early years, the NTFL was contested by a mixture of smaller northern and north-western clubs, but the northern clubs gradually departed, and since 2009 the league has been contested solely by clubs from the north-western coast, all with a NWFU history. Consequently, at the end of the 2014 season, the name of the league was changed to the North West Football League (NWFL).

In 2015, Burnie and Devonport rejoined the competition, each fielding its reserves team in the NWFL seniors while continuing to field its senior team in the Statewide League reserves; this increased the league numbers up to eight. In early 2017, Burnie withdrew from this arrangement, which dropped the number of teams down to seven. Then, in 2018, Burnie and Devonport withdrew their senior teams from the Statewide League and each entered the NWFL proper. The league's senior premiership is now contested by eight clubs.

== Clubs ==
=== Locations ===
Locations of the NWFL clubs

=== Current - Senior ===
Club	Colours	Nickname	Home Ground	Former League	Est.	Years in NWFL	NWFL Premierships	
Club	Colours	Nickname	Home Ground	Former League	Est.	Years in NWFL	Total	Years
Burnie		Dockers	West Park Oval, Burnie	TSL	1995	2001-2008, 2015-2016, 2018-	8	2001, 2002, 2003, 2004, 2005, 2018, 2019, 2020
Circular Head		Saints	Circular Head Recreation Ground, Smithton	NWFU	1907	1987-2018, 2022-	1	1991
Devonport		Magpies	Devonport Oval, Devonport	TSL	1881	2001-2008, 2015-	6	2021, 2022, 2023, 2024, 2025, 2026
East Devonport		Swans	Girdlestone Park, East Devonport	NWFU	1901	1987-2020, 2025-	1	1988
Latrobe		Demons	Darrel Baldock Oval, Latrobe	NWFU	1881	1987-	4	2010, 2011, 2013, 2016
Penguin		Two Blues	Dial Park, Penguin	NWFU	1890	1987-	0	-
Ulverstone		Robins	Ulverstone Recreation Ground, Ulverstone	NWFU	1888	1987-	10	1987, 1990, 1993, 1994, 1995, 1996, 1997, 2000, 2009, 2017
Wynyard		Cats	Wynyard Football Ground, Wynyard	NWFU	1885	1987-	3	2012, 2014, 2015

=== Current - Juniors only ===
Club	Colours	Nickname	Home Ground	Senior league	Est.	Years in NWFL	NWFL Premierships	
Club	Colours	Nickname	Home Ground	Senior league	Est.	Years in NWFL	Total	Years
East Ulverstone		Crows	Haywoods Reserve, Ulverstone	NWFA	2000	2025-	0	-
Somerset		Kangaroos	Langley Park, Somerset	DFA	1959	2025-	0	-

=== Former ===
Club	Colours	Nickname	Home Ground	Former League	Est.	Years in NWFL	NWFL Premierships		Fate
Club	Colours	Nickname	Home Ground	Former League	Est.	Years in NWFL	Total	Years	Fate
Burnie		Tigers	West Park Oval, Burnie	NWFU	1885	1987-1993	1	1992	Absorbed by Burnie Hawks following 1993 season
Deloraine		Kangaroos	Deloraine Recreation Ground, Deloraine	NTFA	1894	1987-2003	0	-	Moved to NTFA following 2003 season
George Town		Saints	George Town Sports Complex, George Town	NTFA	1927	1986-1990	0	-	Moved to TAFL Northern Division following 1990 season
Launceston		Blues	Windsor Park, Riverside	NTFA, TSL	1875	1987-1993, 1998-2008	3	2006, 2007, 2008	Returned to Tasmanian State League in 1994 and 2009
Longford		Tigers	Longford Recreation Ground, Longford	NTFA	1878	1987	0	-	Moved to TAFL Northern Division following 1987 season
North Launceston		Bombers	York Park, Invermay	TSL	1893	2001-2008	0	-	Returned to Tasmanian State League in 2009
Scottsdale		Magpies	Scottsdale Recreation Ground, Scottsdale	NTFA	1889	1987-1999	1	1988	Moved to NTFA following 1999 season
South Burnie		Hawks	Wivenhoe Recreation Ground, Wivenhoe	DFA	1941	1997-1998	0	-	Returned to Darwin FA following 1998 season
South Launceston		Bulldogs	Youngtown Memorial Oval, Youngtown	TSL	1986	1998-2008	2	1998, 1999	Returned to Tasmanian State League in 2009

=== Grand finals ===
- 2026 Devonport 10.14 (74) def Ulverstone 9.6 (60)
- 2025 Devonport 18.23 (131) def Wynyard 1.3 (9) at Latrobe
- 2024 Devonport 8.8 (56) def Wynyard 6.10 (46) at Latrobe
- 2023 Devonport 14.13 (97) def Burnie 8.8 (56) at Latrobe
- 2022 Devonport 7.17 (59) def Wynyard 7.10 (52) at Latrobe
- 2021 Devonport 6.8 (44) def Penguin 5.11 (41) at Latrobe
- 2020 Burnie 11.16 (82) def Devonport 6.7 (43) at Latrobe
- 2019 Burnie 9.17 (71) def Devonport 9.8 (62) at Latrobe
- 2018 Burnie 10.14 (74) def Ulverstone 8.10 (58) at Latrobe
- 2017 Ulverstone 11.10 (76) def Latrobe 7.10 (52) at Latrobe
- 2016 Latrobe 10.12 (72) def Penguin 9.15 (69) at Latrobe
- 2015 Wynyard 19.14 (138) def Ulverstone 11.10 (76) at Latrobe
- 2014 Wynyard 24.16 (160) def Ulverstone 6.8 (44) at Latrobe
- 2013 Latrobe 22.16 (148) def Wynyard 14.17 (101) at Latrobe
- 2012 Wynyard 11.12 (78) def Latrobe 8.17 (65) at Latrobe
- 2011 Latrobe 18.15 (123) def Penguin 17.17 (119) at Latrobe
- 2010 Latrobe 20.13 (133) def Ulverstone 16.7 (103) at Latrobe
- 2009 Ulverstone 22.14 (146) def Smithton 8.10 (56) at Latrobe
- 2008 Launceston 17.18 (120) def Burnie Dockers 14.23 (107) at Latrobe
- 2007 Launceston 19.9 (123) def Ulverstone 16.12 (108) at Latrobe
- 2006 Launceston 22.14 (146) def Devonport 13.11 (89) at Latrobe
- 2005 Burnie Dockers 8.15 (63) def Devonport 6.10 (46) at Latrobe
- 2004 Burnie Dockers 23.19 (157) def Devonport 7.8 (50) at Latrobe
- 2003 Burnie Dockers 14.11 (95) def North Launceston 6.13 (49) at Latrobe
- 2002 Burnie Dockers 14.5 (89) def Ulverstone 5.12 (47) at Latrobe
- 2001 Burnie Dockers 17.14 (116) def North Launceston 7.10 (52) at Latrobe
- 2000 Ulverstone 13.8 (86) def Latrobe 7.10 (52) at Latrobe
- 1999 South Launceston 11.19 (85) def Smithton 7.8 (50) at Latrobe
- 1998 South Launceston 9.11 (65) def East Devonport 9.4 (58) at Latrobe
- 1997 Ulverstone 21.8 (134) def East Devonport 8.8 (56) at Latrobe
- 1996 Ulverstone 18.13 (121) def Wynyard 8.11 (59) at Latrobe
- 1995 Ulverstone 18.15 (123) def Wynyard 14.9 (93) at Latrobe
- 1994 Ulverstone 11.8 (74) def Latrobe 7.8 (50) at Latrobe
- 1993 Ulverstone 14.12 (96) def Scottsdale 8.7 (55) at Latrobe
- 1992 Burnie Tigers 18.10 (118) def Penguin 10.5 (65) at West Park
- 1991 Smithton 18.9 (117) def Ulverstone 10.9 (69) at West Park
- 1990 Ulverstone 18.13 (121) def Scottsdale 12.7 (79) at West Park
- 1989 Scottsdale 13.10 (88) def Smithton 10.10 (70) at West Park
- 1988 East Devonport 20.7 (127) def Burnie Tigers 18.15 (123) at Devonport Oval
- 1987 Ulverstone 13.19 (97) def East Devonport 12.12 (84) at West Park

== Attendance ==
The Northern Tasmanian Football League is considered to be one of the strongest leagues in the state and has a strong supporter following. Games in the NTFL average around 500 spectators.
