= North West Football Union =

Australian rules football competition

- Sport: Australian rules football
- Founded: 1910; 116 years ago
- Folded: 1986; 40 years ago
- Replaced by: North West Football League
- Country: Australia
- Most titles: Burnie; Latrobe; Ulverstone (12 titles each)

The North West Football Union (NWFU) was an Australian rules football competition which ran from 1910 to 1986 on the north-western coast of Tasmania. In its time it was one of the three main leagues in Tasmania, with the Tasmanian Football League in Hobart and Northern Tasmanian Football Association in Launceston representing the rest of the state. Burnie, Latrobe and Ulverstone were the most successful clubs with 12 premierships each. Prior to 1922 the Union was restricted to the Devonport, Latrobe and Ulverstone municipalities. From 1922 Burnie, Penguin and Yeoman were admitted. Wynyard replaced Yeoman in 1925.

In 1929 Devonport and Latrobe decided to break away from the NWFU . They formed with the addition of Kentish and Deloraine the Central Combine. The NWFU was reduced to four teams. Inter-league matches against Circular Head had the Circular Head winning so it was decided to have invite them compete in the Union's finals series. Circular Head played 3 matches and won them all including the premiership. The following year the Central Combine became NWFU East and so the winners of each division played off for the premiership. In 1931 the grand finalist of both divisions played a knock out competition for the premiership.

The league disbanded after the 1986 season after major clubs such as Cooee and Devonport defected to the TFL Statewide League. In 1987, the NWFU effectively merged with the Northern Tasmanian Football Association (NTFA) to form the Northern Tasmanian Football League, which exists today as the North West Football League.

== Clubs ==
=== Final ===
Club	Colours	Nickname	Home Ground	Former League	Est.	Years in NWFU	NWFU Premierships		Fate
Club	Colours	Nickname	Home Ground	Former League	Est.	Years in NWFU	Total	Years	Fate
Burnie	(1930s)(?-1986)	Tigers	West Park Oval, Burnie	EWFA	1885	1922-1931, 1933-1986	14	1927, 1928, 1937, 1939, 1946W, 1947W, 1954, 1958, 1959, 1960, 1962, 1963, 1966, 1974	Recess in 1932. Moved to Northern Tasmanian FL following 1986 season
Cooee		Bulldogs	West Park Oval, Burnie	DFA	1894	1945-1986	7	1961, 1964, 1965, 1973, 1978, 1982, 1984	Moved to TFL Statewide League as Burnie Hawks following 1986 season
Devonport		Magpies	Devonport Oval, Devonport	NWFA	1881	1910-1930, 1934-1986	7	1914, 1915, 1925, 1934, 1936, 1938, 1981	Recess between 1931-33. Moved to TFL Statewide League following 1986 season
East Devonport		Swans	Girdlestone Park, East Devonport	NWFA	1901	1945-1986	3	1945E, 1946E, 1948E, 1968	Moved to Northern Tasmanian FL following 1986 season
Latrobe		Demons	Darrel Baldock Oval, Latrobe	NWFA	1881	1910-1986	12	1913, 1920, 1922, 1924, 1926, 1930, 1931, 1933, 1969, 1970, 1971, 1972	Moved to Northern Tasmanian FL following 1986 season
Penguin		Two Blues	Penguin Recreation Ground, Penguin	RFA, DFA	1890	1922-1937, 1946-1986	3	1932, 1977, 1980	Moved to Darwin FA in 1938. Moved to Northern Tasmanian FL following 1986 season
Smithton		Saints	Circular Head Recreation Ground, Smithton	CHFA	1907	1980-1986	1	1983	Moved to Northern Tasmanian FL following 1986 season
Ulverstone		Robins	Ulverstone Recreation Ground, Ulverstone	NWFA	1888	1910-1986	12	1910, 1923, 1935, 1947E, 1950, 1951, 1953, 1955, 1956, 1957, 1976, 1986	Moved to Northern Tasmanian FL following 1986 season
Wynyard (Yeoman 1922-24)		Cats	Wynyard Football Ground, Wynyard	TCFA, DFA	1885	1922-1932, 1945-1986	5	1948W, 1952, 1967, 1975, 1979	Recess in 1933, re-formed in Table Cape FA in 1934. Moved to Northern Tasmanian FL following 1986 season

=== Former ===
Club	Colours	Nickname	Home Ground	Former League	Est.	Years in NWFU	NWFU Premierships		Fate
Club	Colours	Nickname	Home Ground	Former League	Est.	Years in NWFU	Total	Years	Fate
APPM	(1945)(1948)		Wivenhoe Recreation Ground, Wivenhoe	DFA	1941	1945-1950	2	1945E , 1949	Formed Darwin FA in 1951
Burnie Wanderers			West Park Oval, Burnie	BFL	1905	1913-1914	0	-	Returned to Burnie FL in 1915
Circular Head			Circular Head Recreation Ground, Smithton	–	1929	1929	1	1929	Representative team that was invited to participate in 1929 final series, ended up winning the premiership.
Deloraine			Deloraine Recreation Ground, Deloraine	CFA	1894	1929-1931	0	-	Returned to Central FA after 1931 season
Diggers (Returned Soldiers 1920)			Devonport Oval, Devonport	–	1920	1920-1921	1	1921	Folded after 1921 season
Kentish			Sheffield Recreation Ground, Sheffield and Railton Recreation Ground, Railton	–	1929	1929-1931	0	-	Entered recess after 1931 season
Mersey			Devonport Oval, Devonport	NWFA	1894	1910-1915	2	1911, 1912	Returned to NWFA in 1920
Railway			West Park Oval, Burnie	DFA	1944	1945	0	-	Folded after 1945 season
Yeoman		Robins	Elliott Oval, Elliott	DFA	1895	1945-1950	0	-	Moved to Table Cape FA in 1925. Formed Darwin FA in 1951

== NWFU premierships ==
=== Winners by year ===
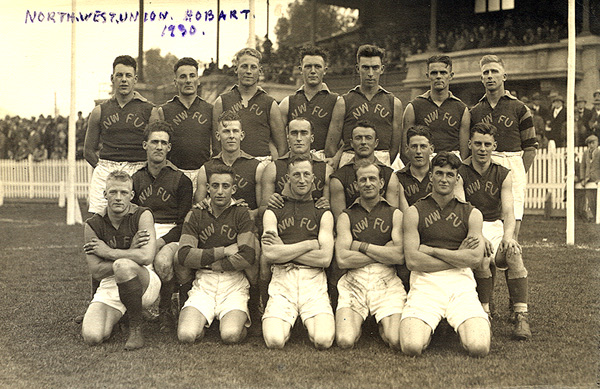
The NWFU intrastate representative team in Hobart, 1930

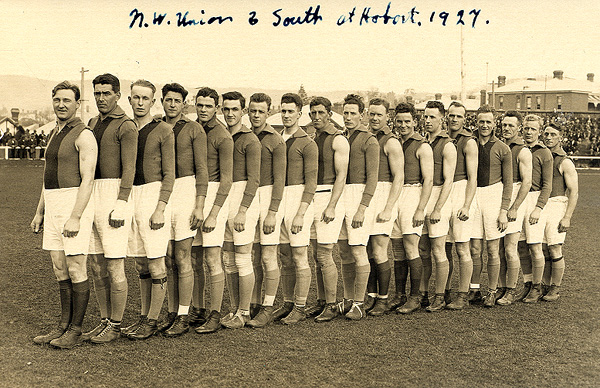
The TFL (southern) team photo. Charlesworth in front and Gorringe 3rd from the end. players in a North vs South fixture at Hobart, 1927

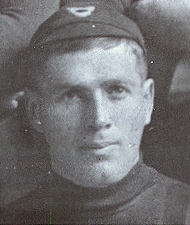
Joe Littler played as many as 500 league games, mostly in the NWFU

Year	Premiers		Runner-up	Year	Premiers		Runner-up
1910	Ulverstone 8.13 (61)	def.	Mersey 5.8 (38)	1952	Wynyard 9.12 (66)	def.	Ulverstone 7.14 (56)
1911	Mersey 7.8 (50)	def.	Latrobe 1.9 (15)	1953	Ulverstone 8.14 (62)	def.	Wynyard 7.14 (56)
1912	Mersey 2.8 (20)	def.	Ulverstone 1.7 (13)	1954	Burnie 9.13 (67)	def.	Wynyard 8.10 (58)
1913	Latrobe		(No Final Played)	1955	Ulverstone 11.14 (80)	def.	Burnie 10.15 (75)
1914	Devonport 9.9 (63)	def.	Latrobe 5.1 (31)	1956	Ulverstone 13.15 (93)	def.	Cooee 7.14 (56)
1915	Devonport 3.2 (20)	def.	Ulverstone 2.6 (18)	1957	Ulverstone 29.17 (191)	def.	Latrobe 9.11 (65)
1916–19	No Competition due to	WWI	and Spanish Flu Epidemic	1958	Burnie 19.15 (129)	def.	East Devonport 13.13 (91)
1920	Latrobe 8.11 (59)	def.	Ulverstone 5.6 (36)	1959	Burnie 16.10 (106)	def.	East Devonport 11.10 (76)
1921	Diggers 7.11 (53)	def.	Latrobe 4.6 (30)	1960	Burnie 12.10 (82)	def.	Cooee 7.15 (57)
1922	Latrobe 5.12 (52)	def.	Burnie 4.12 (36)	1961	Cooee 8.10 (58)	def.	Burnie 8.5 (53)
1923	Ulverstone 9.6 (60)	def.	Latrobe 7.11 (53)	1962	Burnie 12.20 (92)	def.	Devonport 13.4 (82)
1924	Latrobe 10.11 (71)	def.	Devonport 8.9 (57)	1963	Burnie 15.15 (105)	def.	Ulverstone 13.11 (89)
1925	Devonport 11.11 (77)	def.	Ulverstone 6.13 (49)	1964	Cooee 17.12 (114)	def.	Ulverstone 5.14 (44)
1926	Latrobe 12.14 (86)	def.	Ulverstone 12.8 (80)	1965	Cooee 12.14 (86)	def.	Ulverstone 7.9 (51)
1927	Burnie 13.8 (86)	def.	Devonport 12.12 (84)	1966	Burnie 7.7 (49)	def	Latrobe 5.11 (41)
1928	Burnie 7.11 (53)	def.	Devonport 4.13 (37)	1967	Wynyard 13.7 (85)	def.	Cooee 7.7 (49)
1929	Circular Head 8.8 (56)	def.	Burnie 6.14 (50)	1968	East Devonport 15.16 (106)	def.	Ulverstone 10.18 (78)
1930	Latrobe 9.15 (69)	def.	Burnie 6.10 (46)	1969	Latrobe 9.10 (64)	def.	Ulverstone 4.5 (29)
1931	Latrobe 8.19 (67)	def.	Ulverstone 8.10 (58)	1970	Latrobe 14.19 (103)	def.	Wynyard 12.5 (77)
1932	Penguin 14.10 (94)	def.	Latrobe 10.13 (73)	1971	Latrobe 14.16 (100)	def.	East Devonport 5.9 (39)
1933	Latrobe 14.13 (97)	def.	Penguin 6.10 (46)	1972	Latrobe 11.16 (82)	def.	Burnie 8.12 (60)
1934	Devonport 17.14 (116)	def.	Burnie 8.13 (61)	1973	Cooee 14.12 (96)	def.	Latrobe 10.10 (70)
1935	Ulverstone 9.16 (70)	def.	Devonport 8.8 (56)	1974	Burnie 14.15 (99)	def.	Latrobe 9.12 (66)
1936	Devonport 14.11 (95)	def.	Burnie 9.19 (73)	1975	Wynyard 15.10 (100)	def.	Ulverstone 12.8 (80)
1937	Burnie 14.14 (98)	def.	Devonport 13.15 (93)	1976	Ulverstone 14.9 (93)	def.	Penguin 7.19 (61)
1938	Devonport 13.22 (100)	def.	Burnie 9.9 (63)	1977	Penguin 11.18 (84)	def.	Cooee 11.14 (80)
1939	Burnie 16.10 (106)	def.	Latrobe 8.13 (61)	1978	Cooee 20.11 (131)	def.	Wynyard 13.30 (108)
1940–44	No Competition	Due	To World War II	1979	Wynyard 21.24 (150)	def.	Cooee 15.7 (97)
1945 W	APPM 10.20 (80)	def.	Wynyard 11.12 (78)	1980	Penguin 12.11 (83)	def.	Wynyard 11.5 (71)
1945 E	East Devonport 8.15 (63)	def	Devonport 6.16 (52)	1980	Penguin 12.11 (83)	def.	Wynyard 11.5 (71)
1946 W	Burnie 13.11 (89)	def.	Wynyard 12.10 (82)	1981	Devonport 13.9 (87)	def.	Penguin 10.12 (72)
1946 E	East Devonport 18.14 (122)	def	Ulverstone 12.4 (76)	1981	Devonport 13.9 (87)	def.	Penguin 10.12 (72)
1947 W	Burnie 10.17 (77)	def.	Cooee 11.8 (74)	1982	Cooee 16.15 (111)	def.	Penguin 16.5 (101)
1947 E	Ulverstone 15.17 (107)	def	Latrobe 8.17 (65)	1982	Cooee 16.15 (111)	def.	Penguin 16.5 (101)
1948 W	Wynyard 8.13 (61)	def.	Cooee 8.9 (57)	1983	Smithton 20.17 (137)	def.	Cooee 21.10 (136)
1948 E	East Devonport 10.7 (67)	def	Ulverstone 6.8 (44)	1983	Smithton 20.17 (137)	def.	Cooee 21.10 (136)
1949	APPM 14.12 (96)	def.	Ulverstone 9.15 (69)	1984	Cooee 18.16 (124)	def.	Smithton 17.13 (115)
1950	Ulverstone 7.8 (50)	def.	Devonport 7.7 (49)	1985	Penguin 21.9 (135)	def.	Smithton 13.9 (87)
1951	Ulverstone 17.22 (124)	def.	Cooee 8.11 (59)	1986	Ulverstone 9.10 (64)	def.	Smithton 7.7 (49)

Reforming after the war there were two divisions, East and West, Both Divisional premiers would play off.

=== Most premierships ===
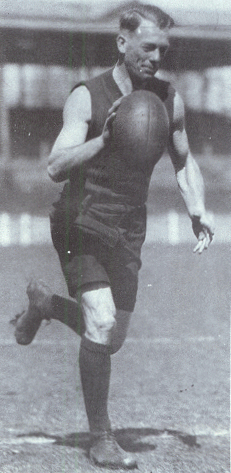
NWFU representative coach Ivor Warne-Smith

Club	Premierships
Burnie	12
Latrobe	12
Ulverstone	12
Cooee	7
Devonport	7
Penguin	4
Wynyard	4
East Devonport	3
APPM	2
Mersey	2
Circular Head	1
Diggers	1
Smithton	1

== Tasmanian State Premiership ==
This was contested regularly between the premiers of the Tasmanian Football League and the Northern Tasmanian Football Association and then the NWFU from 1954 until 1978.

The six winners from the NWFU were:

- 1955 – Ulverstone
- 1963 – Burnie
- 1964 – Cooee
- 1970 – Latrobe
- 1976 – Ulverstone
- 1978 – Cooee

== Best and Fairests ==
The Wander Medal was awarded annually to the best and fairest player in the NWFU, every year from 1948 to 1986. Prior to 1948, the league's best and fairest award was known under various names and given out semi regularly. From 1945 to 1947, an award was given to best and fairest player from the western region but the name of it is unknown. Len Hayes won it in the first two years and Alan Crawford the last.

Wander Medal

- 1948 – Dave Jeffrey
- 1949 – Len Hayes
- 1950 – Lou Redman
- 1951 – Jack Rough
- 1952 – Max Berryman, Peter Gillam
- 1953 – Darrel Eaton
- 1954 – Ray Stokes
- 1955 – Arthur Hodgson
- 1956 – Joe Murphy
- 1957 – Darrel Baldock
- 1958 – Colin Moore
- 1959 – Darrel Baldock
- 1960 – Terry Pierce

- 1961 – Lloyd Robson
- 1962 – Jock O'Brien
- 1963 – John Bingley
- 1964 – Wally Clark
- 1965 – Len Lawson
- 1966 – Bob Hickman
- 1967 – Bob Hickman
- 1968 – Brian Waters
- 1969 – Darrel Baldock
- 1970 – John Jillard
- 1971 – John Jillard
- 1972 – Ricky Smith
- 1973 – Graeme Shephard

- 1974 – Cec Rheinberger
- 1975 – Ricky Watt
- 1976 – Kerry Coates
- 1977 – Ricky Smith
- 1978 – Jim Prentice
- 1979 – Tom Lee
- 1980 – Lindsay Bell
- 1981 – John Murphy
- 1982 – Richard Lynch
- 1983 – Stephen Parsons
- 1984 – John Korporshoek
- 1985 – Neville Muir
- 1986 – Peter Borlini

Cheel Medal

- 1923 – Stan Trebilco
- 1924 – Fred Odgers
- 1925 – Bill Berryman
- 1926 – Rupert Stott
- 1927 – H. O. "Nip" Smith (Penguin)
- 1928 – Charlie Hallam
- 1929 – Tas Langmaid

Royal Medal
Awarded only to players from the eastern region of the NWFU

- 1930 – Bill Berryman

Wright Medal
Awarded only to players from the western region of the NWFU

- 1930 – Jimmy Brown (Ulverstone)
- 1931 – Gerry Plapp

Alford Medal

- 1937 – Clem Riggs
