= West Park Oval =

Sporting venue in Burnie, Tasmania

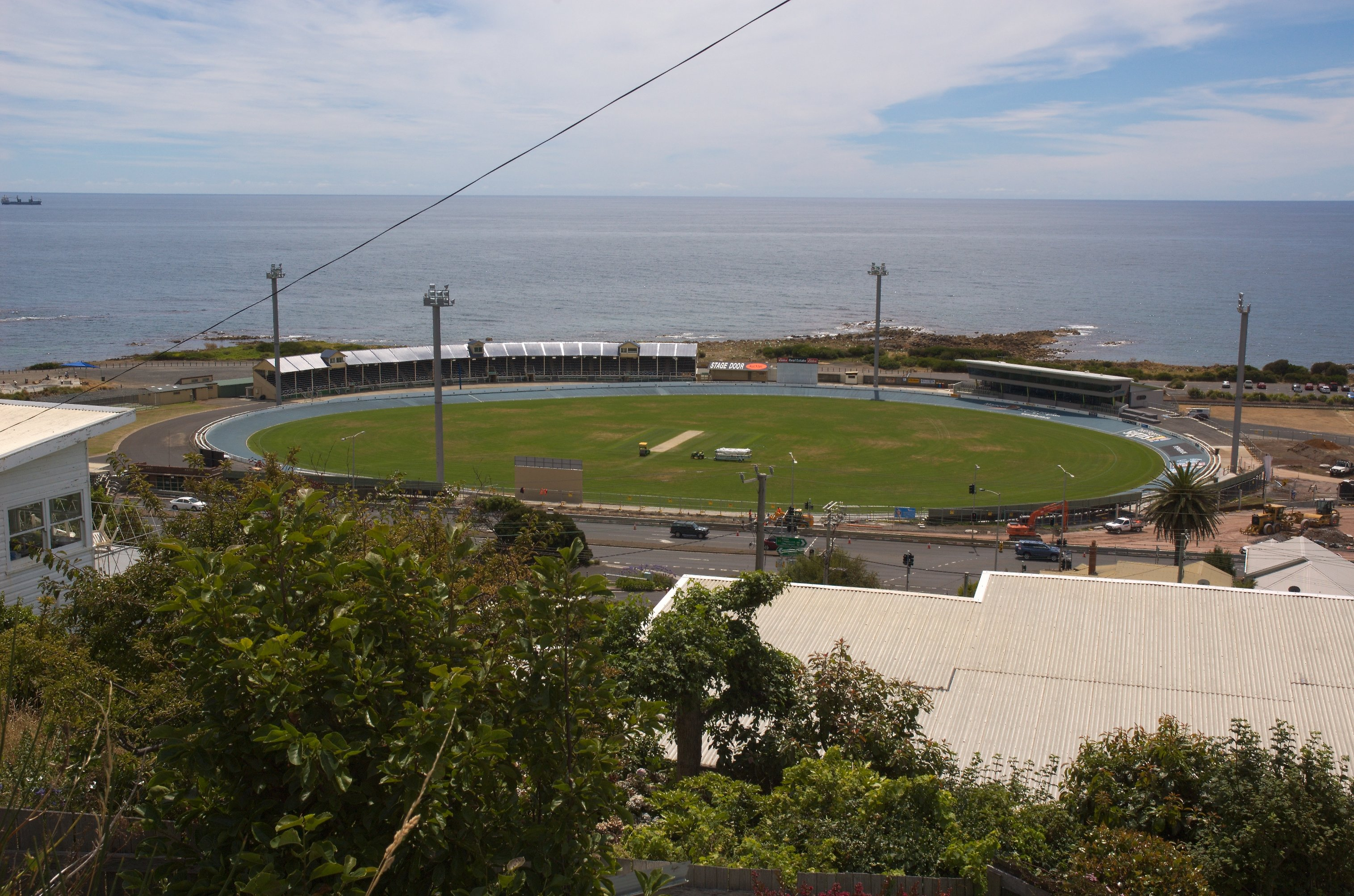
- Interactive map of West Park Oval
- Location: Burnie, Tasmania
- Coordinates: 41°2′45″S 145°53′54″E
- Owner: Burnie City Council
- Operator: Burnie City Council
- Capacity: 12,000
- Surface: Grass

Construction
- Opened: 1900 (Redeveloped 1913/14)

Tenants
- Burnie Dockers Football Club (TSL & NWFL) (1995-present); Burnie Hawks Football Club (TSL) (1987-1994); Burnie Tigers (NWFU/NWFL) (1901-1993); Cooee Bulldogs (NWFU) (1901–1986); Tasmania Devils (VFL) (2008); Burnie Athletics Club; Tasmanian Tigers (One-Day Cup) (2010-2012); Hobart Hurricanes (WBBL) (2018-2019); City of Burnie Cycling Club burnie hurricanes cricket club

West Park Oval is an Australian rules football, cycling and athletics venue located on the shores of Bass Strait in Burnie, Tasmania. It is the current home of the Burnie Dockers in the Tasmanian State League and previously in the NTFL and in the original TFL Statewide League.

== History ==
West Park Oval was also home of the former Cooee Football Club (later renamed Burnie Hawks in 1987 and the former Burnie Tigers Football Club in the North West Football Union (NWFU) and later of the NTFL until both clubs amalgamated in early 1994.

The ground hosted five Tasmanian State Grand Finals between 1961 and 1978, including the final State Premiership decider held in 1978, and was also the site of some of Tasmanian football's most infamous matches.

During an NWFU match in 1936 an extreme storm, described as a hurricane, hit West Park in the final quarter of a match between Burnie Tigers and Penguin, and as players were unable to keep their feet in the blinding rain and wind, many lay flat in the mud as there was great panic in the crowd as the strong winds threatened to demolish the Main Stand. Burnie (finishing the match with eleven men on the field) won 8.10 (58) to Penguin (who finished with six men on the field) 2.5 (17).

Arguably, Tasmanian football's most controversial match was the 1967 Tasmanian State Premiership Final between Wynyard and North Hobart, where hundreds of Wynyard fans invaded the field and tore down the goalposts as North Hobart's Dickie Collins went back to take a kick after the siren with Wynyard leading by one point. Umpires, players, team officials and police attempted to clear a path for Collins to take his kick, but Collins was eventually escorted from the ground under police protection, taking the match ball with him as a souvenir. The Tasmanian Football League declared the match a "no result" and withheld the 1967 State Premiership.

In 1967, a ground record crowd for a football match of 12,951 attended an exhibition match between the North Western Football Union representative team and the defending Victorian Football League premiers, St Kilda. St Kilda 35.27 (237) defeated NWFU 13.7 (85).

In 1996, visiting side Hobart became the first side in the TFL in 38 years not to register a goal in a senior match, managing a paltry 0.5 (5) against the Burnie Dockers and losing by 97 points in atrocious conditions.

The lowest attendance ever recorded at a TFL final was recorded at West Park in atrocious weather conditions in 1997 where only 1,010 braved the elements to see the Burnie Dockers defeat Clarence 14.4 (88) to 2.8 (20) in the Qualifying Final (the two sides would meet again three weeks later in the Grand Final at North Hobart Oval and fight out a 38-goal thriller, with Clarence turning the tables on the hapless Dockers).
It hosted AFL pre-season practice matches in the early 1990s, with over 12,000 attending the Carlton v St Kilda match in 1992.
West Park was the first Tasmanian football venue to install lights for night football, the first night match was played between Tasmania and the Australian Capital Territory (ACT) in a Foster's NFL Shield match on 9 June 1989 where the visiting team won by 14 points in wet and cold conditions.
It became the first ground to host a night match in TFL history on 15 May 1993 when Burnie Hawks defeated coastal-rival Devonport by 51 points.

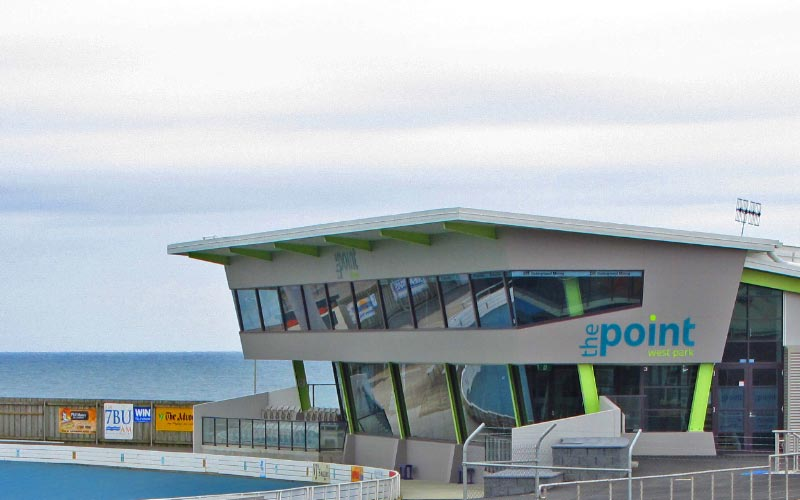

West Park is also the home of the Burnie Athletics Club and the City of Burnie Cycling Club; the ground hosts the Burnie Gift and Burnie Wheel each year.

In 1977 cyclist Danny Clark staged one of the most memorable moments in Tasmanian sporting history when he surged from the rear of the pack, 100m behind on the final lap to scream home to take out the 1977 Burnie Wheel before almost 15,000 screaming fans on 1 January 1977. The legendary call of the finish of the race by North West Coastal sporting identity Harold 'Tiger' Dowling is etched in Coastal sporting folklore. West Park has three grandstands, the 1914-built Burnie Athletic Club Memorial Stand on the Bass Strait side of the ground, an open stand on the opposite wing opened during the 1960s and the newly built The Point members pavilion opened in 2009.

A State cricket match between Tasmania and New South Wales was held at the venue on 4 December 2010. After losing the toss Tasmania were put in and scored 189 in the hybrid one-day format. New South Wales won by 7 wickets. The crowd was 4,552, the highest crowd at the venue since the former TFL Statewide League. The match was played under foggy but clearing skies to a fine 26 degrees. Glenn McGrath was a special guest at the match. Since the small boundary towards the Southern End is approximately 70 metres, Phil Hughes hit a ball onto the Bass Highway to the delight of the crowd. The ground is scheduled to hold another List A match in November 2011 between Tasmania and South Australia in the 2011–12 Ryobi One-Day Cup.
