= Ulverstone Football Club =

Australian rules football club in Tasmania

Ulverstone

Names
- Full name: Ulverstone Football Club
- Nickname(s): Robins
- Former nickname(s): Leven Football Club
- Club song: "We are the Red and Blacks"

2023 season
- After finals: 5th
- Home-and-away season: 5th
- Leading goalkicker: Lewis Deegan (40)

Club details
- Founded: 1888; 137 years ago
- Colours
- Competition: NTFL/NWFL
- President: Simon Eustace
- Coach: Troy Davies
- Ground(s): Ulverstone Football Ground (capacity: 9,000)

Uniforms
Home	Away

Other information
- Official website: ufcrobins.com.au

The Ulverstone Football Club, nicknamed the Robins, is an Australian rules football club based in Ulverstone, Tasmania, Australia. The club fields three teams in the North West Football League and also fields two junior teams in the AFL Tasmania North West Competition.

== History ==
- Home ground – Ulverstone Recreation Ground
- Established – 1888 as Leven Football Club
- Playing colours – Red and black
- Emblem – Robins
- Club theme song – "We are the Red and Blacks" (Tune: "Lily of Laguna")
- Affiliations – NWFA (1894–1909), NWFL (1909), NWFU (1910–1986), NTFL/NWFL (1987–present)

== Premiership titles ==
NWFA Premierships

- 1900, 1903, 1906.

NWFU Premierships

- 1910, 1923, 1935, 1947, 1950, 1951, 1953, 1955, 1956, 1957, 1976, 1986.

NTFL/NWFL Premierships

- 1987, 1990, 1993, 1994, 1995, 1996, 1997, 2000, 2009, 2017.

Tasmanian State Premierships

- 1955, 1976.

== Individual medal winners ==
Cheel Medal winners

- 1923 – Stan Trebilco
- 1929 – Tas Langmaid

Wright Medal winners

- 1930 – Jim Brown

Wander Medal winners

- 1951 – Jack Rough
- 1955 – Arthur Hodgson
- 1962 – Jock O'Brien
- 1981 – John Murphy

Ovaltine Medal winners

- 1993 – Reg Horton
- 1996 – Nathan Howard

Pivot Medal winners

- 1997 – Nathan Howard
- 1999 – Simon Walmsley

Darrel Baldock Medal winners

- 2001 – Scott Blair
- 2010 - Justin Hays

== Competition leading goalkickers ==
NWFU leading goalkickers

- 1912 – J. Palliser (24)
- 1925 – H. McDonald (47)
- 1935 – M. Johnson (60)
- 1946 – R. Stott (80)
- 1951 – S. Walker (73)
- 1964 – W. Pearce (65)
- 1969 – K. Mahoney (79)

NTFL/NWFL leading goalkickers

- 1997 – J. Auton (95)

== Club records ==
Club record score

- 44.28 (292) v Penguin 3.3 (21) in 1991

Club record games holder

- Wayne Wing (369)

== Club record match attendance ==
- 11,866 – Ulverstone v East Devonport at West Park Oval for the 1968 NWFU Grand Final.
