= Penguin Football Club =

Penguin Two Blues

Names
- Full name: Penguin Football Club
- Nickname: Two Blues
- Motto: Angry Penguin
- Club song: "We Are The Penguin Blues"

2024 season
- After finals: 5th
- Home-and-away season: 4th
- Leading goalkicker: Jack Templeton (35)
- Best and fairest: Jay Van Essen

Club details
- Founded: 1890; 136 years ago
- Colours
- Competition: NWFL
- President: Brian Lane
- Coach: Ethan Jackson
- Captain: Jay Van Essen
- Premierships: Senior: 5 (NWFU); Reserves: 2 (NWFL); 5 (NWFU); Under 18/19's: 1 (NWFL); 3 (NWFU)
- Ground: Dial Park
- Former ground: Penguin Recreation Ground (1891-2017)

Uniforms
Home	Away

Other information

The Penguin Football Club is an Australian rules football club based in Penguin, Tasmania. It was founded in 1890.

Penguin currently competes in the North West Football League (NWFL), previously known as the "Northern Tasmanian Football League". It previously competed in the North West Football Union (NWFU).

The current coach of Penguin is Ethan Jackson and previous coaches include former Australian Football League (AFL) players Luke Russell and Maverick Weller

In 2025, the NWFL league has become one of three Premier Leagues in Tasmania. Penguin now becomes equal to teams playing in the NTFA and SFL leagues in Tasmania with representative teams to be picked to play against each other from each region.

== Current Coaching Staff ==
Senior Men

Senior Head Coach - Ethan Jackson

Senior Assistant Coach - Kyle Smith

Senior Assistant Coach - Jack Templeton

Senior Assistant Coach - Terry Duff

Senior Women

Senior Womans Head Coach - Matthew Kinch

Development Men

Development Head Coach - Steven Gillam

Colts

Colts Head Coach - Jobie Ray

== Notable former players ==
- Andrew Lee
- Fred Wooller
- Tim Evans
- Justin Plapp
- Tom Fitzmaurice
- Michael Gale
- Bill Fielding
- Chris McDonald
- Rodney King
- Brock Dicker
- Lenny Hayes
- Stephen Milne
- Brendan Fevola
- Brad Sewell
- Michael O'Laughlan
- Maverick Weller
- Colin Moore
