= 2024 TSL season =

132nd season of the Tasmanian State League

- Date: 29 March − 21 September 2024
- Teams: 7
- Premiers: North Launceston; 8th premiership
- Minor premiers: North Launceston
- Alistair Lynch Medallist: Brad Cox-Goodyer (North Launceston − 28 votes)
- Peter Hudson Medallist: Harvey Griffiths (North Launceston − 53 goals)

The 2024 TSL season was the 132nd and final season of the Tasmanian State League (TSL), the highest-level senior Australian rules football competition in Tasmania. The season began on 29 March and concluded on 21 September, comprising an 18-match home-and-away season over 21 rounds, followed by a three-week finals series.

North Launceston won the TSL premiership for the eighth time, defeating Lauderdale by 20 points in the 2024 TSL Grand Final. The premiership completed a perfect season for North Launceston, which won all of its matches in 2024.

Following the conclusion of the season, the TSL disbanded in preparation for the Tasmania Football Club to enter the Victorian Football League (VFL) in 2026. TSL clubs joined the Northern Tasmanian Football Association (NTFA) or the Southern Football League (SFL) for the 2025 season.

== Background ==
=== Tasmanian AFL club and TSL disbandment ===
On 2 May 2023, the Tasmania Football Club secured a licence to enter the Australian Football League (AFL) following a unanimous vote of AFL club presidents. The club is expected to enter the AFL for the 2028 season, but it is first scheduled to compete in the Victorian Football League (VFL), starting in 2026.

Following the announcement of a licence for the club, AFL Tasmania announced on 5 May 2023 that TSL license agreements will not be extended beyond the end of the 2024 season. This meant that the statewide league would disband at the conclusion of the 2024 season.

A similar arrangement occurred between 2001 and 2008, when the statewide league was disbanded following the 2000 season and the Tasmanian Devils competed in the VFL.

=== Premier Leagues formation ===
On 22 March 2024, the Northern Tasmanian Football Association (NTFA) announced that Launceston and North Launceston would join the NTFA Premier League in 2025. Despite this, the two clubs released a joint statement in April 2024, describing the establishment of an NTFA Premier League as an "ill-considered move" which "lack[ed] consultation and communication", with The Examiner reporting they were looking to establish a new northern-based breakaway league.

In November 2024, the Southern Football League (SFL) executive formally accepted Clarence, Glenorchy, Kingborough, Lauderdale and North Hobart into the competition for the re-established SFL Premier League.

== Ladder ==
Pos	Team	Pld	W	L	D	PF	PA	PP	Pts	Qualification
1	North Launceston (P)	18	18	0	0	1863	849	219.4	72	Finals series
2	Clarence	18	14	4	0	1574	938	167.8	56	Finals series
3	Lauderdale	18	10	7	1	1414	1060	133.4	42	Finals series
4	Kingborough	18	10	7	1	1406	1160	121.2	42	Finals series
5	Glenorchy	18	4	14	0	929	1591	58.4	16	
6	Launceston	18	3	15	0	880	1617	54.4	12	
7	North Hobart	18	3	15	0	814	1665	48.9	12	

Rules for classification: 1) points; 2) percentage; 3) number of points for.
(P) Premiers

== Finals ==
=== Qualifying and elimination finals ===
	Elimination final
Saturday, 7 September (2:00 pm)	Lauderdale 8.14 (62)	def.	Kingborough 8.7 (55)	Lauderdale Oval

	Qualifying final
Saturday, 8 September (1:00 pm)	North Launceston 13.10 (88)	def.	Clarence 6.5 (41)	UTAS Stadium

=== Preliminary final ===
	Preliminary final
Saturday, 14 September (1:30 pm)	Clarence 11.11 (77)	def. by	Lauderdale 11.12 (78)	Blundstone Arena

=== Grand Final ===
2024 TSL Grand Final
Saturday, 21 September (2:30 pm)	North Launceston	def.	Lauderdale	UTAS Stadium
5.3 (33); 8.5 (53); 14.8 (92); 16.9 (105)	Q1; Q2; Q3; Final	4.3 (27); 6.7 (43); 7.9 (51); 12.13 (85)
Leary 7, Manshanden 2, Avent, Cox-Goodyer, Griffiths, Mitchell, Simpson, Sulzberger, Young	Goals	Blackburn 3, Christensen 2, Lane 2, Poland 2, Walsh 2, Bellchambers
Leary, Manshanden, Bennett, Avent, Elmer, Lee	Best	Phillips, Franklin, Martin, Sutton, Christensen, Lane

== Notable events ==
- Glenorchy defeated North Hobart by 10 points in round 2 to claim their first senior victory since round 13 of the 2021 season (1,015 days prior), following winless seasons in 2022 and 2023.

== Awards ==
- Brad Cox-Goodyer (North Launceston) won the Alistair Lynch Medal as the TSL's best and fairest player, finishing with 28 votes.
- Harvey Griffiths (North Launceston) won the Peter Hudson Medal as the leading goalkicker, finishing the season with 53 goals.
- Brad Cox-Goodyer (North Launceston) won a vote from TSL fans to be named as the greatest TSL player of all time, claiming 56% of public support in the final round of voting against Glenorchy player Jaye Bowden.

== See also ==
- 2024 Tasmanian football season
