= 2019 TSL season =

- Teams: 7
- Premiers: North Launceston
- Minor premiers: North Launceston
- Wooden spooners: North Hobart
- Alistair Lynch Medallist: Josh Ponting (North Launceston)
- Peter Hudson Medallist: Aiden Grace (Glenorchy - 48)
- Matches played: 63

The 2019 AFL Tasmania TSL premiership season is an Australian rules football competition staged across Tasmania, Australia over twenty-one home and away rounds and six finals series matches between 30 March and 21 September.

The League was known as the Bupa TSL under a commercial naming-rights sponsorship agreement with the company.

== Participating clubs ==
- Clarence District Football Club
- Glenorchy District Football Club
- Lauderdale Football Club
- Launceston Football Club
- North Hobart Football Club
- North Launceston Football Club
- Tigers Football Club

== 2019 TSL coaches ==
- Jeromey Webberley (Clarence)
- Paul Kennedy (Glenorchy)
- Darren Winter (Lauderdale)
- Mitch Thorp (Launceston)
- Richard Robinson (North Hobart)
- Taylor Whitford (North Launceston)
- Trent Baumeler (Tigers FC)

== Awards ==
- Alastair Lynch Medal (Best afield throughout season): Josh Ponting (North Launceston)
- RACT Insurance Player of the Year (Best player voted by the media): Daniel Joseph (Glenorchy) and Taylor Whitford (North Launceston)
- Matthew Richardson Medal (Rookie of the Year): Sherrin Egger (North Launceston)
- Baldock Medal (Grand Final Best on Ground): Bradley Cox-Goodyer (North Launceston)
- Cazaly Medal (Premiership Coach in TSL): Taylor Whitford (North Launceston)
- Hudson Medal (Highest goal kicker in TSL season): Mitch Thorp (Launceston) 62 Goals

== 2019 TSL leading goalkickers ==
- Bradley Cox-Goodyer (North Launceston) - 51
- Aiden Grace (Glenorchy) - 50
- Colin Garland (North Hobart) - 42
- Mitch Thorp (Launceston) - 41

=== Highest Individual Goalkickers In a Match ===
- 8 – Jaye Bowden (Glenorchy) v (Clarence) – 31 May 2019 at KGV Oval
- 8 – Colin Garland (North Hobart) v (Clarence) – 6 July 2019 at North Hobart Oval
- 7 – Colin Garland (North Hobart) v (North Launceston) – 11 May 2019 at UTAS Stadium
- 7 – Mitch Thorp (Launceston) v (Lauderdale) – 20 May 2019 at Windsor Park

== Premiership season ==
=== Round 1 ===
| | Round 1 |
| Saturday, 30 March (2:00pm) | North Hobart 8.10 (58) | def. by | Lauderdale 16.15 (111) | North Hobart Oval |
| Saturday, 30 March (2:00pm) | Launceston 5.10 (40) | def. by | Glenorchy 9.15 (69) | Windsor Park |
| Saturday, 30 March (6:00pm) | Tigers FC 8.6 (54) | def. by | North Launceston 16.11 (107) | Twin Ovals Complex |
| | Bye; Clarence |

=== Round 2 ===
| | Round 2 |
| Saturday, 6 April (2:00pm) | Lauderdale 15.14 (104) | def. | Launceston 10.11 (71) | Lauderdale Oval |
| Saturday, 6 April (2:00pm) | North Launceston 7.15 (57) | def. | Clarence 5.6 (36) | UTAS Stadium |
| Saturday, 6 April (6:00pm) | Glenorchy 11.11 (77) | def. | North Hobart 5.6 (36) | KGV Oval |
| | Bye; Tigers FC |

=== Round 3 ===
| | Round 3 |
| Saturday, 13 April (2:00pm) | Clarence 11.8 (74) | def. by | Glenorchy 20.16 (136) | Blundstone Arena |
| Saturday, 13 April (2:00pm) | Lauderdale 8.17 (65) | def. | Tigers FC 5.9 (39) | Lauderdale Oval |
| Saturday, 13 April (2:00pm) | North Hobart 5.5 (35) | def. by | Launceston 12.16 (88) | North Hobart Oval |
| | Bye; North Launceston |

=== Round 4 ===
| | Round 4 |
| Friday, 19 April (1:45pm) | Launceston 9.6 (60) | def. by | North Launceston 12.20 (92) | Windsor Park |
| Friday, 19 April (2:30pm) | Tigers FC 15.10 (100) | def. | North Hobart 5.10 (40) | Twin Ovals Complex |
| Saturday, 20 April (2:00pm) | Clarence 11.10 (76) | def. by | Lauderdale 13.13 (91) | Blundstone Arena |
| | Bye; Glenorchy |

=== Round 5 ===
| | Round 5 |
| Thursday, 25 April (3:00pm) | Glenorchy 9.10 (64) | def. | Tigers FC 6.6 (42) | KGV Oval |
| Saturday, 27 April (2:00pm) | Clarence 8.10 (58) | def. by | Launceston 10.8 (68) | Blundstone Arena |
| Saturday, 27 April (2:00pm) | Lauderdale 11.8 (74) | def. | North Launceston 8.10 (58) | Lauderdale Oval |
| | Bye; North Hobart |

=== Round 6 ===
| | Round 6 |
| Saturday, 4 May (2:00pm) | Clarence 16.15 (111) | def. | North Hobart 5.9 (39) | Blundstone Arena |
| Saturday, 4 May (2:00pm) | Launceston 19.5 (119) | def. | Tigers FC 8.7 (55) | Windsor Park |
| Saturday, 4 May (5:30pm) | North Launceston 14.12 (96) | def. | Glenorchy 7.6 (48) | UTAS Stadium |
| | Bye; North Hobart |

=== Round 7 ===
| | Round 7 |
| Saturday, 11 May (2:00pm) | Glenorchy 11.8 (74) | def. | Lauderdale 9.9 (63) | KGV Oval |
| Saturday, 11 May (2:00pm) | North Launceston 12.10 (82) | def. | North Hobart 11.5 (71) | UTAS Stadium |
| Saturday, 11 May (6:00pm) | Tigers FC 16.15 (111) | def. | Clarence 10.10 (70) | Twin Ovals Complex |
| | Bye; Launceston |

=== Round 8 ===
| | Round 8 |
| Saturday, 18 May (2:00pm) | Launceston 10.8 (68) | def. by | Lauderdale 12.14 (86) | Windsor Park |
| Saturday, 18 May (6:00pm) | North Launceston 20.16 (136) | def. | Tigers FC 3.5 (23) | UTAS Stadium |
| Sunday, 19 May (2:00pm) | North Hobart 6.11 (47) | def. by | Glenorchy 12.20 (92) | North Hobart Oval |
| | Bye; Clarence |

=== Round 9 ===
| | Round 9 |
| Saturday, 25 May (2:00pm) | Clarence 8.6 (54) | def. by | North Launceston 20.16 (136) | Blundstone Arena |
| Saturday, 25 May (2:00pm) | Glenorchy 6.8 (44) | def. by | Launceston 9.16 (70) | KGV Oval |
| Saturday, 25 May (2:00pm) | Lauderdale 16.14 (110) | def. | North Hobart 6.11 (47) | Lauderdale Oval |
| | Bye; Tigers FC |

=== Round 10 ===
| | Round 10 |
| Friday, 31 May (7:30pm) | Glenorchy 22.8 (140) | def. | Clarence 11.4 (70) | KGV Oval |
| Saturday, 1 June (2:00pm) | Tigers FC 7.12 (54) | def. by | Lauderdale 14.12 (96) | Twin Ovals Complex |
| Saturday, 1 June (2:00pm) | Launceston 17.8 (110) | def. | North Hobart 10.6 (66) | Windsor Park |
| | Bye; North Launceston |

=== Round 11 ===
| | Round 11 |
| Friday, 14 June (7:00pm) | North Launceston 14.16 (100) | def. | Launceston 4.7 (31) | UTAS Stadium |
| Saturday, 15 June (2:00pm) | Lauderdale 16.18 (114) | def. | Clarence 6.8 (44) | Lauderdale Oval |
| Saturday, 15 June (2:00pm) | North Hobart 10.6 (66) | def. by | Tigers FC 10.11 (71) | North Hobart Oval |
| | Bye; Glenorchy |

=== Round 12 ===
| | Round 12 |
| Saturday, 22 June (2:00pm) | Clarence 6.7 (43) | def. by | Tigers FC 15.8 (98) | Blundstone Arena |
| Saturday, 22 June (2:00pm) | Lauderdale 16.10 (106) | def. | Glenorchy 11.9 (75) | Lauderdale Oval |
| Saturday, 22 June (2:00pm) | North Hobart 2.3 (15) | def. by | North Launceston 15.16 (106) | North Hobart Oval |
| | Bye; Launceston |

=== Round 13 ===
| | Round 13 |
| Saturday, 29 June (1:00pm) | Tigers FC 7.13 (55) | def. by | Glenorchy 10.8 (68) | Twin Ovals Complex |
| Saturday, 29 June (2:00pm) | North Launceston 4.13 (37) | def. | Lauderdale 10.14 (74) | UTAS Stadium |
| Saturday, 29 June (2:00pm) | Launceston 13.4 (82) | def. | Clarence 4.2 (26) | Windsor Park |
| | Bye; North Hobart |

=== Round 14 ===
| | Round 14 |
| Saturday, 6 July (1:30pm) | North Launceston 18.22 (130) | def. | Glenorchy 6.7 (43) | UTAS Stadium |
| Saturday, 6 July (2:00pm) | Tigers FC 9.10 (64) | def. by | Launceston 16.11 (107) | Twin Ovals Complex |
| Saturday, 6 July (2:00pm) | North Hobart 16.4 (100) | def. | Clarence 5.15 (45) | North Hobart Oval |
| | Bye; Lauderdale |

=== Round 15 ===
| | Round 15 |
| Saturday, 13 July (2:00pm) | Glenorchy 7.3 (45) | def. by | Launceston 20.14 (134) | KGV Oval |
| Saturday, 13 July (2:00pm) | Tigers FC 9.10 (64) | def. | North Launceston 6.10 (46) | Twin Ovals Complex |
| Saturday, 13 July (2:00pm) | Lauderdale 7.11 (53) | def. | North Hobart 3.11 (29) | Lauderdale Oval |
| | Bye; Clarence |

=== Round 16 ===
| | Round 16 |
| Saturday, 20 July (2:00pm) | North Hobart 10.14 (74) | def. by | Glenorchy 14.13 (97) | North Hobart Oval |
| Saturday, 20 July (2:00pm) | North Launceston 9.13 (67) | def. | Clarence 4.12 (36) | UTAS Stadium |
| Saturday, 20 July (2:00pm) | Launceston 17.10 (112) | def. | Lauderdale 10.8 (68) | Windsor Park |
| | Bye; Tigers FC |

=== Round 17 ===
| | Round 17 |
| Saturday, 27 July (2:00pm) | Clarence 10.8 (68) | def. by | Glenorchy 11.17 (83) | Blundstone Arena |
| Saturday, 27 July (2:00pm) | Lauderdale 13.17 (95) | def. | Tigers FC 9.8 (62) | Lauderdale Oval |
| Saturday, 27 July (2:00pm) | North Hobart 13.8 (86) | def. | Launceston 11.13 (79) | North Hobart Oval |
| | Bye; North Launceston |

=== Round 18 ===
| | Round 18 |
| Saturday, 3 August (1:30pm) | Launceston 7.15 (57) | def. by | North Launceston 14.11 (95) | Windsor Park |
| Saturday, 3 August (2:00pm) | Clarence 15.11 (101) | def. | Lauderdale 12.7 (79) | Blundstone Arena |
| Saturday, 3 August (2:00pm) | Tigers FC 18.13 (121) | def. | North Hobart 7.6 (48) | Twin Ovals Complex |
| | Bye; Glenorchy |

=== Round 19 ===
| | Round 19 |
| Saturday, 10 August (2:00pm) | Clarence 4.6 (30) | def. by | Launceston 14.11 (95) | Blundstone Arena |
| Saturday, 10 August (2:00pm) | Glenorchy 12.6 (78) | def. | Tigers FC 6.19 (55) | KGV Oval |
| Saturday, 10 August (2:00pm) | Lauderdale 3.5 (23) | def. by | North Launceston 9.14 (68) | Lauderdale Oval |
| | Bye; North Hobart |

=== Round 20 ===
| | Round 20 |
| Saturday, 17 August (1:00pm) | Glenorchy 14.8 (92) | def. | Lauderdale 6.8 (44) | KGV Oval |
| Saturday, 17 August (2:00pm) | North Launceston 15.18 (108) | def. | North Hobart 10.5 (65) | Invermay Park |
| Saturday, 17 August (2:00pm) | Tigers FC 11.2 (68) | def. by | Clarence 10.16 (76) | Twin Ovals Complex |
| | Bye; Launceston |

=== Round 21 ===
| | Round 21 |
| Friday, 23 August (6:30pm) | North Hobart 9.13 (67) | def. | Clarence 9.8 (62) | North Hobart Oval |
| Saturday, 24 August (2:00pm) | Launceston 11.11 (77) | def. | Tigers FC 11.4 (70) | Windsor Park |
| Saturday, 24 August (5:30pm) | Glenorchy 4.8 (32) | def. by | North Launceston 12.11 (83) | KGV Oval |
| | Bye; Lauderdale |

== Ladder ==
2019 TSL Ladder
| Pos | Team | Pld | W | L | D | PF | PA | PP | Pts |
|---|---|---|---|---|---|---|---|---|---|
| 1 | North Launceston (MP) (P) | 18 | 15 | 3 | 0 | 1604 | 860 | 186.5 | 60 |
| 2 | Lauderdale | 18 | 13 | 5 | 0 | 1456 | 1165 | 125.0 | 52 |
| 3 | Glenorchy | 18 | 12 | 6 | 0 | 1357 | 1287 | 105.4 | 48 |
| 4 | Launceston | 18 | 11 | 7 | 0 | 1468 | 1193 | 123.1 | 44 |
| 5 | Tigers FC | 18 | 6 | 12 | 0 | 1206 | 1401 | 86.1 | 24 |
| 6 | Clarence | 18 | 3 | 15 | 0 | 1080 | 1631 | 66.2 | 12 |
| 7 | North Hobart | 18 | 3 | 15 | 0 | 989 | 1623 | 60.9 | 12 |

Rules for classification: 1) points; 2) percentage; 3) number of points for.
(P) Premiers; (MP) Minor Premiers

== Season records ==
=== Highest club scores ===
- 22.8. (140) – Glenorchy v Clarence 31 May 2019 at KGV Oval
- 20.16. (136) - North Launceston v Clarence 25 May 2019 at Blundstone Arena
- 20.16. (136) – North Launceston v Tigers FC 18 May 2019 at UTAS Stadium

=== Lowest club scores ===
- 2.3. (15) – North Hobart v North Launceston 15.16. (106) – 22 June 2019 at North Hobart Oval
- 3.5. (23) – Lauderdale v North Launceston 9.14. (68) – 10 August 2019 at Lauderdale Oval
- 3.5. (23) – Tigers FC v North Launceston 20.16. (136) – 18 May 2019 at UTAS Stadium

== TSL Team Of The Year ==
2019 TSL Team of The Year
| B: | Braden Van Buuren (North Launceston) | Edward Trupp (Lauderdale) | Jake Smith (Launceston) |
| HB: | Josh McGuinness (Lauderdale) (Captain) | Harrison Gunther (Glenorchy) | Jay Foon (North Launceston) |
| C: | Sam Darley (North Hobart) | Jobi Harper (Launceston) | Josh Ponting (North Launceston) |
| HF: | Bradley Cox-Goodyer (North Launceston) (Captain) | Mitch Thorp (Launceston) | Taylor Whitford (North Launceston) |
| F: | Jaye Bowden (Glenorchy) | Aiden Grace (Glenorchy) | Callen Daly (Glenorchy) |
| Foll: | Haydn Smith (Lauderdale) | Fletcher Seymour (Launceston) | Kieran Lovell (Tigers FC) |
| Int: | Ben Kamaric (Glenorchy) | Sam Siggins (Lauderdale) | Brady Jones (Clarence) |
| Int: | Ryan Matthews (Tigers FC) | | |
| Coach: | Mitch Thorpe (Launceston) | | |

== TSL Finals Series ==
=== Elimination Final ===
| | Elimination Final |
| Saturday, 31 August (1:00pm) | Launceston 14.10 (94) | def. | Tigers FC 5.9 (39) | Windsor Park |

=== Qualifying Final ===
| | Qualifying Final |
| Saturday, 31 August (2:00pm) | Lauderdale 13.15 (93) | def. | Glenorchy 12.15 (87) | Blundstone Arena |

=== 1st Semi-Final ===
| | 1st Semi-Final |
| Saturday, 7 September (2:30pm) | Glenorchy 4.4 (28) | def. by | Launceston 12.16 (88) | KGV Oval |

=== 2nd Semi-Final ===
| | 2nd Semi-Final |
| Sunday, 8 September (2:00pm) | North Launceston 13.17 (95) | def. | Lauderdale 8.10 (58) | Windsor Park |

=== Preliminary Final ===
| | Preliminary Final |
| Saturday, 14 September (2:00pm) | Lauderdale 13.9 (87) | def. | Launceston 11.14 (80) | Blundstone Arena |

=== Grand Final ===
2019 TSL Grand Final
Saturday 21 September (3:00 pm) | North Launceston | def. | Lauderdale | Blundstone Arena (crowd: 4,692)
4.3 (27); 7.5 (47); 10.8 (68); 13.10 (88) | Q1; Q2; Q3; Final | 1.2 (8); 5.4 (34); 8.5 (53); 9.5 (59) | Darrel Baldock Medal: Josh Ponting (North Launceston)
J. Callow 3, W. Edmunds 2, D. Bannister 2, T. Donnelly, B. Simpson, S. Egger, J. Foon, J. Ponting, B. Cox-Goodyer | Goals | N. Raglione 2, H. Kerinaiua, B. McGuinness, S. Burge, E. Trupp, A. Saunders, A. Hill, R. McManus
J. Ponting, J. Avent, J. Foon, J. Callow, R. Mansell, W. Edmunds | Best | B. Walsh, N. Franklin, E. Trupp, J. McGuinness, H. Kerinaiua, N. Raglione
