= 2023 TSL season =

131st season of the Tasmanian State League

- Date: 7 April − 21 September 2023
- Teams: 7
- Premiers: Kingborough; 1st premiership
- Minor premiers: Kingborough
- Alistair Lynch Medallist: Sam Siggins (Lauderdale − 23 votes)
- Peter Hudson Medallist: Brad Cox-Goodyer (North Launceston − 53 goals)

The 2023 TSL season was the 131st season of the Tasmanian State League (TSL), the highest-level senior Australian rules football competition in Tasmania. The season began on 7 April and concluded on 21 September, comprising an 18-match home-and-away season over 21 rounds, followed by a three-week finals series.

Kingborough won the TSL premiership for the first time, defeating North Launceston by 15 points in the 2023 TSL Grand Final.

== Background ==
=== Glenorchy player shortage ===
During the pre-season, reports emerged that Glenorchy was suffering a shortage of players and was "unlikely" to field a senior team in 2023. The club had failed to win a single game during the 2022 season, with just 12 players attending one training session held around January 2023.

Ultimately, the club was able to field senior and reserves sides in 2023, although it failed to win a senior game for the second season in a row.

== Ladder ==
Pos	Team	Pld	W	L	D	PF	PA	PP	Pts	Qualification
1	Kingborough (P)	18	15	3	0	1488	840	177.1	60	Finals series
2	North Launceston	18	15	3	0	1645	938	175.4	60	Finals series
3	Clarence	18	11	7	0	1232	1162	106.0	44	Finals series
4	Launceston	18	9	9	0	1314	1106	118.8	36	Finals series
5	North Hobart	18	7	11	0	1091	1374	79.4	28	
6	Lauderdale	18	6	12	0	1135	1320	86.0	24	
7	Glenorchy	18	0	18	0	728	1893	38.5	0	

Rules for classification: 1) points; 2) percentage; 3) number of points for.
(P) Premiers

== Finals ==
=== Qualifying and elimination finals ===
	Qualifying final
Saturday, 9 September (2:30 pm)	Clarence 11.13 (79)	def.	Launceston 2.5 (17)	Blundstone Arena

	Elimination final
Saturday, 9 September (2:30 pm)	Kingborough 10.11 (71)	def.	North Launceston 5.5 (35)	Twin Ovals

=== Preliminary final ===
	Preliminary final
Saturday, 17 September (1:30 pm)	North Launceston 7.8 (50)	def.	Clarence 4.6 (30)	UTAS Stadium

=== Grand Final ===
2023 TSL Grand Final
Saturday, 21 September (2:30 pm)	Kingborough	def.	North Launceston	North Hobart Oval
1.2 (8); 5.6 (36); 8.7 (55); 8.8 (56)	Q1; Q2; Q3; Final	3.2 (20); 3.3 (21); 4.6 (30); 5.11 (41)
Lovell 3, Baker, Carter, Clifford, Cole, Tomkinson	Goals	Cox-Goodyer 3, Griffiths, Sulzberger
Lovell, Clifford, Baker, Bastick, Gadomski, McCulloch	Best	Cox-Goodyer, Vandam, Griffiths, Avent, Bennett, Lee

== Awards ==
- Sam Siggins (Lauderdale) won the Alistair Lynch Medal as the TSL's best and fairest player for the second season in a row, finishing with 23 votes.
- Brad Cox-Goodyer (North Launceston) won the Peter Hudson Medal as the leading goalkicker, finishing the home-and-away season with 53 goals.
