= 2018 TSL season =

- Teams: 7
- Premiers: North Launceston
- Minor premiers: North Launceston
- Wooden spooners: North Hobart
- Alistair Lynch Medallist: Josh Ponting (North Launceston)
- Peter Hudson Medallist: Mitch Thorp (Launceston - 62)
- Matches played: 63

The 2018 AFL Tasmania TSL premiership season is an Australian rules football competition staged across Tasmania, Australia over twenty-one home and away rounds and six finals series matches between 30 March and 15 September.

The League was known as the Bupa TSL under a commercial naming-rights sponsorship agreement with the company.

Before the season started there were three team changes to the competition with Burnie and Devonport departing the league. Hobart City were replaced in the competition by North Hobart who returned to the competition after a 4-year absence.

== Participating clubs ==
- Clarence District Football Club
- Glenorchy District Football Club
- Lauderdale Football Club
- Launceston Football Club
- North Hobart Football Club
- North Launceston Football Club
- Tigers Football Club

== 2018 TSL coaches ==
- Jeromey Webberley (Clarence)
- Paul Kennedy (Glenorchy)
- Darren Winter (Lauderdale)
- Sam Lonergan (Launceston)
- Richard Robinson (North Hobart)
- Taylor Whitford (North Launceston)
- Trent Baumeler (Tigers FC)

== Awards ==
- Alastair Lynch Medal (Best afield throughout season): Josh Ponting (North Launceston)
- RACT Insurance Player of the Year (Best player voted by the media): Daniel Joseph (Glenorchy) and Taylor Whitford (North Launceston)
- Matthew Richardson Medal (Rookie of the Year): Sherrin Egger (North Launceston)
- Baldock Medal (Grand Final Best on Ground): Bradley Cox-Goodyer (North Launceston)
- Cazaly Medal (Premiership Coach in TSL): Taylor Whitford (North Launceston)
- Hudson Medal (Highest goal kicker in TSL season): Mitch Thorp (Launceston) 62 Goals

== 2018 TSL leading goalkickers ==
- Mitch Thorp (Launceston) - 66
- Jaye Bowden (Glenorchy) - 46

=== Highest Individual Goalkickers In a Match ===
- 8 – Jaye Bowden (Glenorchy) v (North Hobart) – 16 June 2018 at North Hobart Oval
- 8 – Mitch Thorp (Launceston) v (Tigers FC) – 5 May 2018 at Windsor Park
- 7 – Jacob Gillbee (Lauderdale) v (North Hobart) – 11 August 2018 at North Hobart Oval
- 7 – Ben McGuinness (Lauderdale) v (Glenorchy) – 14 July 2018 at Lauderdale Oval
- 7 – Mitch Thorp (Launceston) v (North Hobart) – 7 April 2018 at Windsor Park

== Premiership season ==
=== Round 1 ===
	Round 1
Friday, 30 March (3:05pm)	North Hobart 4.7 (31)	def. by	Tigers FC 12.12 (84)	North Hobart Oval
Friday, 30 March (6:30pm)	North Launceston 17.8 (110)	def.	Launceston 8.6 (54)	UTAS Stadium
Saturday, 31 March (2:00pm)	Lauderdale 10.15 (75)	def. by	Clarence 14.8 (92)	Lauderdale Oval
	Bye; Glenorchy

=== Round 2 ===
	Round 2
Saturday, 7 April (2:00pm)	Glenorchy 22.15 (147)	def.	Lauderdale 9.12 (66)	KGV Oval
Saturday, 7 April (2:00pm)	Launceston 21.21 (147)	def.	North Hobart 2.4 (16)	Windsor Park
Saturday, 7 April (2:00pm)	North Launceston 13.14 (92)	def.	Tigers FC 4.6 (30)	UTAS Stadium
	Bye; Glenorchy

=== Round 3 ===
	Round 3
Saturday, 14 April (2:00pm)	Lauderdale 9.8 (62)	def. by	Launceston 18.16 (124)	Lauderdale Oval
Saturday, 14 April (2:00pm)	North Launceston 7.9 (51)	def. by	Glenorchy 16.7 (103)	UTAS Stadium
Saturday, 14 April (2:30pm)	North Hobart 4.8 (32)	def. by	Clarence 13.18 (96)	North Hobart Oval
	Bye; Tigers FC

=== Round 4 ===
	Round 4
Friday, 20 April (7:15pm)	Glenorchy 18.20 (128)	def.	North Hobart 5.5 (35)	KGV Oval
Friday, 20 April (7:15pm)	Tigers FC 13.5 (83)	def. by	Lauderdale 16.14 (110)	Twin Ovals Complex
Saturday, 21 April (2:00pm)	Clarence 11.9 (75)	def. by	North Launceston 11.21 (87)	Blundstone Arena
	Bye; Launceston

=== Round 5 ===
	Round 5
Wednesday, 25 April (3:00pm)	Tigers FC 8.6 (54)	def. by	Glenorchy 11.8 (74)	Twin Ovals Complex
Saturday, 28 April (2:00pm)	Clarence 8.7 (55)	def. by	Launceston 13.7 (85)	Blundstone Arena
Saturday, 28 April (2:00pm)	North Hobart 2.5 (17)	def. by	North Launceston 28.21 (189)	North Hobart Oval
	Bye; Lauderdale

=== Round 6 ===
	Round 6
Saturday, 5 May (1:00pm)	Glenorchy 11.5 (71)	def. by	Clarence 12.13 (85)	KGV Oval
Saturday, 5 May (2:00pm)	North Hobart 6.11 (47)	def. by	Lauderdale 11.23 (89)	North Hobart Oval
Saturday, 5 May (2:00pm)	Launceston 17.11 (113)	def.	Tigers FC 3.4 (22)	Windsor Park
	Bye; North Launceston

=== Round 7 ===
	Round 7
Saturday, 12 May (1:00pm)	Tigers FC 1.8 (14)	def. by	Clarence 8.17 (65)	Twin Ovals Complex
Saturday, 12 May (2:00pm)	North Launceston 19.19 (133)	def.	Lauderdale 5.9 (39)	UTAS Stadium
Saturday, 12 May (2:00pm)	Launceston 12.9 (81)	def.	Glenorchy 13.2 (80)	Windsor Park
	Bye; North Hobart

=== Round 8 ===
	Round 8
Saturday, 19 May (2:00pm)	Launceston 7.8 (50)	def. by	North Launceston 15.13 (103)	Windsor Park
Sunday, 20 May (2:00pm)	Tigers FC 5.12 (42)	def. by	North Hobart 7.8 (50)	Twin Ovals Complex
Sunday, 20 May (2:00pm)	Lauderdale 13.15 (93)	def. by	Clarence 16.11 (107)	Lauderdale Oval
	Bye; Glenorchy

=== Round 9 ===
	Round 9
Saturday, 26 May (2:00pm)	Lauderdale 14.15 (99)	def.	Glenorchy 9.12 (66)	Lauderdale Oval
Saturday, 26 May (2:00pm)	North Hobart 7.2 (44)	def. by	Launceston 24.7 (151)	North Hobart Oval
Saturday, 26 May (2:00pm)	North Launceston 13.12 (90)	def.	Tigers FC 9.6 (60)	UTAS Stadium
	Bye; Clarence

=== Round 10 ===
	Round 10
Saturday, 2 June (2:00pm)	Clarence 16.12 (108)	def.	North Hobart 7.4 (46)	Blundstone Arena
Saturday, 2 June (2:00pm)	Glenorchy 5.2 (32)	def. by	North Launceston 13.16 (94)	KGV Oval
Saturday, 2 June (2:00pm)	Lauderdale 17.9 (111)	def.	Launceston 12.9 (81)	Lauderdale Oval
	Bye; Tigers FC

=== Round 11 ===
	Round 11
Saturday, 9 June (2:00pm)	Glenorchy 16.6 (102)	def.	Tigers FC 11.10 (76)	KGV Oval
Saturday, 9 June (2:00pm)	North Launceston 26.11 (167)	def.	North Hobart 6.1 (37)	UTAS Stadium
Saturday, 9 June (2:00pm)	Launceston 6.11 (47)	def. by	Clarence 13.10 (88)	Windsor Park
	Bye; Lauderdale

=== Round 12 ===
	Round 12
Saturday, 16 June (2:00pm)	Clarence 10.8 (68)	def.	North Launceston 9.12 (66)	Blundstone Arena
Saturday, 16 June (2:00pm)	Tigers FC 9.9 (63)	def. by	Lauderdale 13.9 (87)	Twin Ovals Complex
Saturday, 16 June (2:00pm)	North Hobart 7.7 (49)	def. by	Glenorchy 18.15 (123)	North Hobart Oval
	Bye; Launceston

=== Round 13 ===
	Round 13
Saturday, 23 June (2:00pm)	Glenorchy 12.9 (81)	def.	Clarence 3.10 (28)	KGV Oval
Saturday, 23 June (2:00pm)	Tigers FC 9.4 (58)	def.	Launceston 6.7 (43)	Twin Ovals Complex
Saturday, 23 June (2:00pm)	Lauderdale 13.16 (94)	def.	North Hobart 8.4 (52)	Lauderdale Oval
	Bye; North Launceston

=== Round 14 ===
	Round 14
Saturday, 30 June (2:00pm)	Clarence 15.12 (102)	def.	Tigers FC 8.7 (55)	Blundstone Arena
Saturday, 30 June (2:00pm)	Glenorchy 15.10 (100)	def.	Launceston 7.10 (52)	KGV Oval
Saturday, 30 June (2:00pm)	North Launceston 12.16 (88)	def.	Lauderdale 9.8 (62)	UTAS Stadium
	Bye; North Hobart

=== Round 15 ===
	Round 15
Friday, 6 July (7:00pm)	North Launceston 8.12 (60)	def.	Launceston 8.11 (59)	UTAS Stadium
Saturday, 7 July (2:00pm)	Clarence 10.9 (69)	def. by	Lauderdale 18.8 (116)	Blundstone Arena
Saturday, 7 July (2:00pm)	North Hobart 9.4 (58)	def. by	Tigers FC 12.16 (88)	North Hobart Oval
	Bye; Glenorchy

=== Round 16 ===
	Round 16
Saturday, 14 July (2:00pm)	Tigers FC 5.6 (36)	def. by	North Launceston 17.13 (115)	Twin Ovals Complex
Saturday, 14 July (2:00pm)	Lauderdale 16.14 (110)	def.	Glenorchy 6.15 (51)	Lauderdale Oval
Sunday, 15 July (2:00pm)	Launceston 18.17 (125)	def.	North Hobart 4.4 (28)	Windsor Park
	Bye; Clarence

=== Round 17 ===
	Round 17
Saturday, 21 July (2:00pm)	Clarence 13.22 (100)	def.	North Hobart 10.7 (67)	Blundstone Arena
Saturday, 21 July (2:00pm)	Glenorchy 8.7 (55)	def. by	North Launceston 13.14 (92)	KGV Oval
Saturday, 21 July (2:00pm)	Launceston 20.15 (135)	def.	Lauderdale 10.11 (71)	Windsor Park
	Bye; Tigers FC

=== Round 18 ===
	Round 18
Saturday, 28 July (2:00pm)	Glenorchy 22.23 (155)	def.	North Hobart 1.5 (11)	KGV Oval
Saturday, 28 July (2:00pm)	Lauderdale 13.10 (88)	def.	Tigers FC 12.15 (87)	Lauderdale Oval
Saturday, 28 July (2:00pm)	North Launceston 13.11 (89)	def.	Clarence 11.4 (70)	UTAS Stadium
	Bye; Launceston

=== Round 19 ===
	Round 19
Saturday, 4 August (2:00pm)	Tigers FC 9.8 (62)	def. by	Glenorchy 21.11 (137)	Twin Ovals Complex
Saturday, 4 August (2:00pm)	North Hobart 5.7 (37)	def. by	North Launceston 30.20 (200)	North Hobart Oval
Saturday, 4 August (2:00pm)	Launceston 15.15 (105)	def.	Clarence 10.11 (71)	Windsor Park
	Bye; Lauderdale

=== Round 20 ===
	Round 20
Saturday, 11 August (2:00pm)	Clarence 9.4 (58)	def. by	Glenorchy 13.11 (89)	Blundstone Arena
Saturday, 11 August (2:00pm)	Tigers FC 11.5 (71)	def. by	Launceston 12.18 (90)	Twin Ovals Complex
Saturday, 11 August (2:00pm)	North Hobart 8.4 (52)	def. by	Lauderdale 26.16 (172)	North Hobart Oval
	Bye; North Launceston

=== Round 21 ===
	Round 21
Saturday, 18 August (2:00pm)	Clarence 15.13 (103)	def.	Tigers FC 12.9 (81)	Blundstone Arena
Saturday, 18 August (2:00pm)	Lauderdale 11.13 (79)	def. by	North Launceston 17.12 (114)	Lauderdale Oval
Saturday, 18 August (2:00pm)	Launceston 13.7 (85)	def.	Glenorchy 11.10 (76)	Windsor Park
	Bye; North Hobart

== Ladder ==
2018 TSL Ladder
Pos	Team	Pld	W	L	D	PF	PA	PP	Pts
1	North Launceston (P)	18	16	2	0	1940	963	201.5	64
2	Glenorchy	18	11	7	0	1670	1188	140.6	44
3	Launceston	18	11	7	0	1627	1226	132.7	44
4	Clarence	18	11	7	0	1440	1299	110.9	44
5	Lauderdale	18	10	8	0	1623	1591	102.0	40
6	Tigers FC	18	3	15	0	1066	1550	68.8	12
7	North Hobart	18	1	17	0	709	2258	31.4	4

Rules for classification: 1) points; 2) percentage; 3) number of points for.
(P) Premiers

== Season records ==
=== Highest club scores ===
- 30.20. (200) – North Launceston v North Hobart 4 August 2018 at North Hobart Oval
- 28.21. (189) - North Launceston v North Hobart 28 April 2018 at North Hobart Oval
- 26.16. (172) – Lauderdale v North Hobart 11 August 2018 at North Hobart Oval

=== Lowest club scores ===
- 1.5. (11) – North Hobart v Glenorchy 22.23. (155) – 28 July 2018 at KGV Oval
- 1.8. (14) – Tigers FC v Clarence 8.17. (65) – 12 May 2018 at Twin Ovals Complex
- 2.4. (16) – North Hobart v Launceston 21.21. (147) – 7 April 2018 at Windsor Park

== TSL Team Of The Year ==
2018 TSL Team of The Year
B:	James Holmes (Clarence)	Josh Grant (Glenorchy)	Jay Foon (North Launceston)
HB:	Daniel Joseph (Glenorchy)	Jobi Harper (Launceston)	Josh McGuinness (Lauderdale) (Vice-Captain)
C:	Rhys Mott (Glenorchy)	Phil Bellchambers (Lauderdale)	Jake Cox (Clarence)
HF:	Jaye Bowden (Glenorchy)	Tom Bennett (North Launceston)	Bradley Cox-Goodyer (North Launceston) (Captain)
F:	Dylan Riley (Launceston)	Mitch Thorp (Launceston)	Luke Graham (Tigers FC)
Foll:	Ryan Bailey (Clarence)	Taylor Whitford (North Launceston)	Nat Franklin (Lauderdale)
Int:	Zach Burt (North Launceston)	Josh Ponting (North Launceston)	Mitch Carter (Tigers FC)
Int:	Harrison Gunther (Glenorchy)		
Coach:	Jeromey Webberley (Clarence)		

== TSL Finals Series ==
=== Elimination Final ===
(Saturday 25 August)

- Clarence: 6.11.47
- Lauderdale: 15.15.105

at Blundstone Arena

=== Qualifying Final ===
(Saturday 25 August)

- Glenorchy: 13.10.88
- Launceston: 10.14.74

at Blundstone Arena

=== 1st Semi-Final ===
(Saturday 1 September)

- Launceston: 6.6.42
- Lauderdale: 17.12.114

at UTAS Stadium

=== 2nd Semi-Final ===
(Saturday 1 September)

- North Launceston: 14.11.95
- Glenorchy: 5.7.37

at UTAS Stadium

=== Preliminary Final ===
(Saturday 8 September)

- Glenorchy: 11.5.71
- Lauderdale: 13.11.89

at Blundstone Arena

=== Grand Final ===
2018 TSL Grand Final
Saturday 15 September (3:00 pm)	North Launceston Bombers	def.	Lauderdale Bombers	UTAS Stadium (crowd: 4,423)
2.4.16; 3.8.26; 5.13.43; 7.21.63	Q1; Q2; Q3; Final	2.3.15; 3.7.25; 3.9.27; 4.9.33	Darrel Baldock Medal:
T. Thomas 2, S. Egger, B. McCulloch, T. Couch, B. Cox-Goodyer, T. Bennett	Goals	T. Mosquito 2, J. Gillbee 2
B. Cox-Goodyer, J. Ponting, T. Thomas, A. Lee, J. Avent, B. Sharman	Best	O. Shaw, N. Franklin, P. Bellchambers, N. Baker, H. Smith, R. McManus

=== Development League Grand Final ===
(Saturday 23 September)

- Launceston: 7.7. (49)
- North Launceston: 2.3. (15)

at UTAS Stadium
