= 2021 TSL season =

- Teams: 7
- Premiers: Launceston
- Minor premiers: Launceston
- Wooden spooners: North Hobart
- Alistair Lynch Medallist: Brad Cox-Goodyer; North Launceston
- Peter Hudson Medallist: Dylan Riley; Launceston (59 goals)

The 2021 Tasmanian State League season is the 129th season of the men's Australian rules football competition in Tasmania. The season will be contested by seven teams across twenty-one home and away rounds and six finals series between 2 April and 12 September.

== Participating Clubs ==
| Club | Home ground | Location | 2020 season |
|---|---|---|---|
| Clarence | Bellerive Oval | Bellerive | 5-7 (semi-final) |
| Glenorchy | KGV Oval | Glenorchy | 3-9 (DNQ Finals) |
| Lauderdale | Lauderdale Oval | Lauderdale | 7-5 (semi-final) |
| Launceston | Windsor Park | Riverside | 9-3 (Premiers) |
| Kingborough Tigers Football Club | Kingston Twins Oval | Kingston | 4-8 (DNQ Finals) |
| North Hobart | North Hobart Oval | North Hobart | 3-9 (DNQ Finals) |
| North Launceston | York Park | Launceston | 11-1 (Runners up) |

== Fixtures ==
=== Round 1 ===
| | Round 1 |
| Friday 2 April (2:30 pm) | North Hobart 10.7 (67) | def. by | Kingborough 10.18 (78) | North Hobart Oval |
| Friday 2 April (6:30 pm) | North Launceston 6.6 (42) | def. by | Launceston 14.13 (97) | York Park |
| Saturday 3 April (2:00 pm) | Lauderdale 11.13 (79) | def. | Clarence 10.12 (72) | Lauderdale Oval |
| | Bye; Glenorchy |

=== Round 2 ===
| | Round 2 |
| Saturday 10 April (1:30 pm) | Glenorchy 8.7 (55) | def. by | Clarence 13.9 (87) | KGV Oval |
| Saturday 10 April (2:00 pm) | Kingborough 15.6 (96) | def. | Lauderdale 10.7 (67) | Kingston Twin Ovals |
| Saturday 10 April (2:00 pm) | North Launceston 17.22 (124) | def. | North Hobart 1.5 (11) | York Park |
| | Bye; Launceston |

=== Round 3 ===
| | Round 3 |
| Saturday 17 April (1:30 pm) | Glenorchy 10.7 (67) | def. | Lauderdale 5.11 (41) | KGV Oval |
| Saturday 17 April (2:00 pm) | Clarence 12.1 (73) | def. | North Launceston 9.8 (62) | Bellerive Oval |
| Saturday 17 April (2:00 pm) | Launceston 17.9 (111) | def. | Kingborough 5.12 (42) | Windsor Park |
| | Bye; North Hobart |

=== Round 4 ===
| | Round 4 |
| Saturday 24 April (1:30 pm) | Lauderdale 4.10 (34) | def. by | North Launceston 19.13 (127) | Lauderdale Oval |
| Sunday 25 April (2:00 pm) | Kingborough 10.12 (72) | def. | Glenorchy 6.12 (48) | Kingston Twin Ovals |
| Sunday 25 April (2:00 pm) | North Hobart 7.1 (43) | def. by | Launceston 25.18 (168) | North Hobart Oval |
| | Bye; Clarence |

=== Round 5 ===
| | Round 5 |
| Saturday 1 May (1:30 pm) | Kingborough 8.10 (58) | def. by | Clarence 11.10 (76) | Kingston Twin Ovals |
| Saturday 1 May (2:00 pm) | Lauderdale 9.7 (61) | def. by | North Hobart 12.7 (79) | Lauderdale Oval |
| Saturday 1 May (2:00 pm) | Launceston 30.13 (193) | def. | Glenorchy 7.3 (45) | Windsor Park |
| | Bye; North Launceston |

=== Round 6 ===
| | Round 6 |
| Saturday 8 May (2:00 pm) | Clarence 5.8 (38) | def. by | Launceston 17.8 (110) | Bellerive Oval |
| Saturday 8 May (2:00 pm) | North Hobart 3.13 (31) | def. by | Glenorchy 16.12 (108) | North Hobart Oval |
| Saturday 8 May (2:00 pm) | North Launceston 12.13 (85) | def. | Launceston 7.12 (54) | York Park |
| | Bye; Lauderdale |

=== Round 7 ===
| | Round 7 |
| Saturday 15 May (1:30 pm) | Glenorchy 5.4 (34) | def. by | North Launceston 16.23 (119) | KGV Oval |
| Saturday 15 May (2:00 pm) | Clarence 9.16 (70) | def. | North Hobart 10.9 (69) | Bellerive Oval |
| Saturday 15 May (2:00 pm) | Launceston 15.13 (103) | def. | Lauderdale 8.7 (55) | Windsor Park |
| | Bye; Kingborough |

=== Round 8 ===
| | Round 8 |
| Friday 21 May (7:00 pm) | North Launceston 11.12 (78) | def. | Launceston 10.3 (63) | York Park |
| Saturday 22 May (2:00 pm) | Clarence 16.14 (110) | def. | Lauderdale 4.10 (34) | Bellerive Oval |
| Saturday 22 May (2:00 pm) | Kingborough 21.11 (137) | def. | North Hobart 4.4 (28) | Kingston Twin Ovals |
| | Bye; Glenorchy |

=== Round 9 ===
| | Round 9 |
| Saturday 29 May (2:00 pm) | Clarence 14.18 (102) | def. | Glenorchy 5.4 (34) | Bellerive Oval |
| Saturday 29 May (2:00 pm) | Lauderdale 8.12 (60) | def. by | Kingborough 9.10 (64) | Lauderdale Oval |
| Saturday 29 May (2:00 pm) | North Hobart 8.9 (57) | def. by | North Launceston 10.17 (77) | North Hobart Oval |
| | Bye; Launceston |

=== Round 10 ===
| | Round 10 |
| Saturday 5 June (1:30 pm) | Glenorchy 10.6 (66) | def. | Lauderdale 6.11 (47) | KGV Oval |
| Saturday 5 June (2:00 pm) | Kingborough 8.5 (53) | def. by | Launceston 11.13 (79) | Kingston Twin Ovals |
| Saturday 5 June (2:00 pm) | North Launceston 11.13 (79) | def. | Clarence 6.9 (45) | York Park |
| | Bye; North Hobart |

=== Round 11 ===
| | Round 11 |
| Friday 11 June (7:00 pm) | Glenorchy 6.4 (40) | def. by | Kingborough 9.8 (62) | KGV Oval |
| Saturday 12 June (2:00 pm) | Lauderdale 5.5 (35) | def. by | North Launceston 10.10 (70) | Lauderdale Oval |
| Saturday 12 June (2:00 pm) | Launceston 21.16 (142) | def. | North Hobart 6.3 (39) | Windsor Park |
| | Bye; Clarence |

=== Round 12 ===
| | Round 12 |
| Saturday 19 June (1:30 pm) | Glenorchy 5.4 (34) | def. by | Launceston 22.15 (147) | KGV Oval |
| Saturday 19 June (2:00 pm) | Kingborough 11.9 (75) | def. | Clarence 6.8 (44) | Kingston Twin Ovals |
| Saturday 19 June (2:00 pm) | North Hobart 4.11 (35) | def. by | Lauderdale 15.12 (102) | North Hobart Oval |
| | Bye; North Launceston |

=== Round 13 ===
| | Round 13 |
| Saturday 26 June (2:00 pm) | North Hobart 11.4 (70) | def. by | Glenorchy 14.11 (95) | North Hobart Oval |
| Saturday 26 June (2:00 pm) | North Launceston 13.10 (88) | def. | Kingborough 7.10 (52) | York Park |
| Saturday 26 June (2:00 pm) | Launceston 20.10 (130) | def. | Clarence 9.7 (61) | Windsor Park |
| | Bye; Lauderdale |

=== Round 14 ===
| | Round 14 |
| Saturday 3 July (1:30 pm) | Glenorchy 4.9 (33) | def. by | North Launceston 21.12 (138) | KGV Oval |
| Saturday 3 July (2:00 pm) | Clarence 14.10 (94) | def. | North Hobart 5.9 (39) | Bellerive Oval |
| Saturday 3 July (2:00 pm) | Lauderdale 9.11 (65) | def. by | Launceston 15.13 (103) | Lauderdale Oval |
| | Bye; Kingborough |

=== Round 15 ===
| | Round 15 |
| Saturday 10 July (2:00 pm) | Clarence 16.14 (110) | def. | Lauderdale 8.13 (61) | Bellerive Oval |
| Saturday 10 July (2:00 pm) | North Hobart 7.4 (46) | def. by | Kingborough 12.14 (86) | North Hobart Oval |
| Saturday 10 July (2:00 pm) | Launceston 14.7 (91) | def. | North Launceston 5.8 (38) | Windsor Park |
| | Bye; Glenorchy |

=== Round 16 ===
| | Round 16 |
| Saturday 17 July (1:00 pm) | Kingborough 7.9 (51) | def. by | Launceston 9.10 (64) | Kingston Twin Ovals |
| Saturday 17 July (2:00 pm) | Lauderdale 20.10 (130) | def. | Glenorchy 7.7 (49) | Lauderdale Oval |
| Saturday 17 July (2:00 pm) | North Launceston 11.11 (77) | def. by | Clarence 11.13 (79) | York Park |
| | Bye; North Hobart |

=== Round 17 ===
| | Round 17 |
| Saturday 24 July (1:30 pm) | Glenorchy 6.4 (40) | def. by | Clarence 9.11 (65) | KGV Oval |
| Saturday 24 July (2:00 pm) | Lauderdale 9.12 (66) | def. | Kingborough 8.16 (64) | Lauderdale Oval |
| Saturday 24 July (2:00 pm) | North Hobart 9.7 (61) | def. by | North Launceston 15.7 (97) | North Hobart Oval |
| | Bye; Launceston |

=== Round 18 ===
| | Round 18 |
| Saturday 31 July (1:00 pm) | Kingborough 23.9 (147) | def. | Glenorchy 8.9 (57) | Kingston Twin Ovals |
| Saturday 31 July (2:00 pm) | Launceston 21.18 (144) | def. | North Hobart 3.5 (23) | Windsor Park |
| Saturday 31 July (3:00 pm) | North Launceston 18.17 (125) | def. | Lauderdale 6.5 (41) | York Park |
| | Bye; Clarence |

=== Round 19 ===
| | Round 19 |
| Saturday 7 August (2:00 pm) | Clarence 9.9 (63) | def. by | Kingborough 9.14 (68) | Bellerive Oval |
| Saturday 7 August (2:00 pm) | Lauderdale 9.11 (65) | def. | North Hobart 9.9 (63) | Lauderdale Oval |
| Saturday 7 August (2:00 pm) | Launceston 28.13 (181) | def. | Glenorchy 5.5 (35) | Windsor Park |
| | Bye; North Launceston |

=== Round 20 ===
| | Round 20 |
| Saturday 14 August (1:30 pm) | Glenorchy 8.8 (56) | def. by | North Hobart 10.10 (70) | KGV Oval |
| Saturday 14 August (2:00 pm) | Clarence 13.7 (85) | def. | Launceston 11.17 (83) | Bellerive Oval |
| Saturday 14 August (2:00 pm) | Kingborough 9.12 (66) | def. by | North Launceston 16.8 (104) | Kingston Twin Ovals |
| | Bye; Lauderdale |

=== Round 21 ===
| | Round 21 |
| Saturday 21 August (1:00 pm) | North Launceston 15.17 (107) | def. | Glenorchy 5.6 (36) | York Park |
| Saturday 21 August (2:00 pm) | North Hobart 7.9 (51) | def. by | Clarence 12.14 (86) | North Hobart Oval |
| Saturday 21 August (2:00 pm) | Launceston 17.15 (117) | def. | Lauderdale 5.4 (34) | Windsor Park |
| | Bye; Kingborough |

== Ladder ==
| Pos | Team | Pld | W | L | D | PF | PA | PP | Pts | Qualification |
|---|---|---|---|---|---|---|---|---|---|---|
| 1 | Launceston | 18 | 16 | 2 | 0 | 2126 | 861 | 246.9 | 64 | Finals series |
| 2 | North Launceston | 18 | 14 | 4 | 0 | 1637 | 962 | 170.2 | 56 | Finals series |
| 3 | Clarence | 18 | 12 | 6 | 0 | 1360 | 1204 | 113.0 | 48 | Finals series |
| 4 | Kingborough Tigers | 18 | 10 | 8 | 0 | 1325 | 1193 | 111.1 | 40 | Finals series |
| 5 | Lauderdale | 18 | 5 | 13 | 0 | 1077 | 1520 | 70.9 | 20 | |
| 6 | Glenorchy | 18 | 4 | 14 | 0 | 932 | 1809 | 51.5 | 16 | |
| 7 | North Hobart | 18 | 2 | 16 | 0 | 882 | 1790 | 49.3 | 8 | |

Updated to match(es) played on 22 August 2021. Source: SportsTG
Rules for classification: 1) points; 2) percentage; 3) number of points for.

== Finals series ==
=== 1st Semi-final ===
| | 1st Semi-final |
| Sunday 29 August (2:00 pm) | Clarence 8.12 (60) | def. | Kingborough 5.9 (39) | Bellerive Oval |

=== 2nd Semi-final ===
| | 2nd Semi-final |
| Saturday 28 August (12:45 pm) | Launceston 8.11 (59) | def. by | North Launceston 10.8 (68) | Windsor Park |

=== Preliminary Final ===
| | Preliminary Final |
| Sunday 5 September (1:00 pm) | Launceston 13.11 (89) | def. | Clarence 5.7 (37) | Windsor Park |

=== Grand Final ===
2021 TSL Grand Final
Sunday 12 September (2:30pm) | North Launceston | def. by | Launceston | University of Tasmania Stadium
2.1 (13); 4.4 (28); 6.6 (42); 6.7 (43) | Q1; Q2; Q3; Final | 3.1 (19); 5.2 (32); 7.3 (45); 12.5 (77) | Darrel Baldock Medal: Joe Groenewegen (Launceston)
T. Bennett, J. Rushton, B. Leary, M. Walsh, O. Sanders, B. Cox-Goodyer | Goals | B. Taylor 3, J. Groenewegen 2, M. Thorp 2, M. Musicka 2, J. Donnellan, J. Blackberry, Z. Morris
M. Stingel, M. Walsh, T. Donnelly, B. Simpson, R. Whitney, B. Van Buuren | Best | J. Groenewegen, M. Hodge, J. Harper, J. Hinds, J. Blackberry, B. Taylor
