= Kieran Lovell =

Australian rules footballer (born 1997)

Personal information
- Born: 16 May 1997 (age 29)
- Original team: Kingborough Football Club (TSL)
- Draft: No. 22, 2015 national draft
- Debut: Round 6, 2016, Hawthorn vs. Greater Western Sydney, at Spotless Stadium
- Height: 174 cm (5 ft 9 in)
- Weight: 85 kg (187 lb)
- Position: Midfielder

Club information
- Current club: Kingborough

Playing career^{1}
Years	Club	Games (Goals)
2016–2018	Hawthorn	2 (0)
- ^{1} Playing statistics correct to the end of 2018.

Career highlights
- VFL premiership player: 2018; 3x Ray Lorkin Medallist: 2019, 2020, 2022

Kieran Lovell (born 16 May 1997) is an Australian rules footballer who currently plays for the Kingborough Football Club in the Southern Football League (SFL). He previously played professionally for the Hawthorn Football Club in the Australian Football League (AFL).

== Early career ==
Lovell played for the Kingborough Tigers in the TSL in the 2015 season and won the Tasmanian MVP and All-Australian Under-18 honours after performing in the NAB AFL Under-18 Championships. He had been compared to former Hawthorn captain Sam Mitchell with regards to his in and under ball skills.

== AFL career ==
Lovell made his senior debut for the Hawks against GWS Giants at Spotless Stadium in round 6, he had 6 kicks and 5 handballs when his team lost by 75 points.

Lovell suffered a shoulder injury at the beginning of the 2017 season requiring surgery. He was able to return to senior football with Box Hill and helped them play in the finals.

On 24 September 2017, Lovell signed a one-year deal to remain at Hawthorn until the end of 2018, however after zero senior games in 2018, he was delisted.

== Post AFL career ==
Before the 2019 TSL season Lovell returned to the Kingborough Football Club.

== Statistics ==
Legend
G	Goals	K	Kicks	D	Disposals	T	Tackles
B	Behinds	H	Handballs	M	Marks

Season	Team	No.	Games	Totals							Averages (per game)							Votes
Season	Team	No.	Games	G	B	K	H	D	M	T	G	B	K	H	D	M	T	Votes
2016	Hawthorn	36	2	0	0	16	13	29	4	1	0.0	0.0	8.0	6.5	14.5	2.0	0.5	0
2017	Hawthorn	36	0	—	—	—	—	—	—	—	—	—	—	—	—	—	—	0
2018	Hawthorn	21	0	—	—	—	—	—	—	—	—	—	—	—	—	—	—	0
Career			2	0	0	16	13	29	4	1	0.0	0.0	8.0	6.5	14.5	2.0	0.5	0

== Honours and achievements ==
Team

- VFL premiership player (Box Hill): 2018
