= 1991 TFL Statewide League season =

- Teams: Burnie Hawks; Clarence Kangaroos; Devonport Blues; Glenorchy Magpies; Hobart Tigers; New Norfolk Eagles; North Hobart Demons; North Launceston Robins; Sandy Bay Seagulls; South Launceston Bulldogs
- Premiers: North Hobart
- Minor premiers: North Launceston; 2nd minor premiership

Attendance
- Matches played: 111
- Total attendance: 177,429 (1,598 per match)

The 1991 TFL Statewide League premiership season was an Australian rules football competition staged across Tasmania over twenty one roster rounds and six finals series matches between 30 March and 21 September 1991.

This was the sixth season of the statewide competition and The League was known as the Cascade-Boags Statewide League under a dual commercial naming-rights sponsorship agreement with both Cascade Brewery in Hobart and Boag's Brewery in Launceston.

== Participating Clubs ==
- Burnie Hawks Football Club
- Clarence District Football Club
- Devonport Blues Football Club
- Glenorchy District Football Club
- Hobart Football Club
- New Norfolk District Football Club
- North Hobart Football Club
- North Launceston Football Club
- Sandy Bay Football Club
- South Launceston Football Club

=== 1991 TFL Statewide League Club Coaches ===
- Richard Lakeland (Burnie Hawks)
- Peter Daniel & Leigh McConnon (Clarence)
- Peter Knights (Devonport)
- Danny Ling (Glenorchy)
- Mark Browning (Hobart)
- Peter Chisnall (New Norfolk)
- Mark Yeates (North Hobart)
- (England) – Steven Goulding (North Launceston)
- Paul Jeffrey (Sandy Bay)
- Bob Keddie (South Launceston)

=== St Luke's Cup (Reserves) Grand Final ===
- Nth Launceston 14.16 (100) v Glenorchy 12.11 (83) – North Hobart Oval

=== Tasmania Bank Colts (Under-19's) Grand Final ===
- Glenorchy 17.15 (117) v Nth Launceston 8.8 (56) – North Hobart Oval

=== Leading Goalkickers: TFL Statewide League ===
- Paul Dac (New Norfolk) – 133
- Byron Howard Jnr (North Hobart) – 106
- Shane Fell (Glenorchy) – 73
- David Giles (Clarence) – 64

=== Medal Winners ===
- Gary Williamson (Clarence) – William Leitch Medal
- Darren Mathewson (North Hobart) – Darrel Baldock Medal (Best player in TFL Grand Final)
- Brendan Skelly (New Norfolk) – George Watt Medal (Reserves)
- John Cooley (New Norfolk) – V.A Geard Medal (Under-19's)
- Justin Goc (Hobart) – D.R Plaister Medal (Under-17's)

=== Interstate Matches ===
State Of Origin Match (Tuesday, 28 May 1991)

- Victoria 17.14 (116) v Tasmania 14.20 (104) – Att: 14,086 at North Hobart Oval

=== 1991 TFL Club Home Attendance Figures ===
- Nth Hobart: 18,899 (10) at 1,889
- Clarence: 15,652 (10) at 1,565
- Glenorchy: 17,180 (11) at 1,561
- Hobart: 16,952 (11) at 1,541
- Nth Launceston: 16,803 (11) at 1,527
- Devonport: 16,644 (11) at 1,513
- New Norfolk: 14,896 (10) at 1,489
- Burnie Hawks: 9,974 (10) at 997
- Sandy Bay: 10,835 (11) at 985
- Sth Launceston: 6,656 (10) at 665

== 1991 TFL Statewide League Ladder ==
Pos	Team	Pld	W	L	D	PF	PA	PP	Pts
1	North Launceston	21	17	4	0	2448	1756	139.4	68
2	North Hobart	21	16	5	0	2606	1746	149.3	64
3	Clarence	21	16	5	0	2279	1722	132.3	64
4	Burnie Hawks	21	10	11	0	2068	2031	101.8	40
5	Hobart	21	10	11	0	2260	2302	98.2	40
6	Devonport	21	10	11	0	1985	2060	96.4	40
7	Glenorchy	21	9	11	1	1878	2050	91.6	38
8	New Norfolk	21	8	13	0	2148	2109	101.8	32
9	Sandy Bay	21	7	13	1	1932	2152	89.8	30
10	South Launceston	21	1	20	0	1546	3130	49.4	4

=== Round 1 ===
(Saturday, 30 March & Monday, 1 April 1991)

- Nth Hobart 16.12 (108) v Glenorchy 6.11 (47) – Att: 2,121 at KGV Football Park
- Clarence 10.16 (76) v Burnie Hawks 10.10 (70) – Att: 1,186 at Bellerive Oval
- Nth Launceston 18.16 (124) v Sth Launceston 5.3 (33) – Att: 1,485 at York Park
- Hobart 15.15 (105) v Sandy Bay 13.11 (89) – Att: 1,475 at North Hobart Oval (Monday)
- Devonport 11.17 (83) v New Norfolk 7.6 (48) – Att: 1,911 at Devonport Oval (Monday)

=== Round 2 ===
(Saturday, 6 April 1991)

- Nth Hobart 13.19 (97) v Clarence 8.12 (60) – Att: 2,185 at North Hobart Oval
- Sandy Bay 11.16 (82) v Glenorchy 8.10 (58) – Att: 1,102 at Queenborough Oval
- Hobart 21.22 (148) v New Norfolk 16.9 (105) – Att: 1,535 at Boyer Oval
- Devonport 19.12 (126) v Sth Launceston 16.15 (111) – Att: 740 at York Park
- Nth Launceston 12.10 (82) v Burnie Hawks 11.10 (76) – Att: 1,031 at West Park Oval

=== Round 3 ===
(Saturday, 13 April 1991)

- Hobart 25.20 (170) v Sth Launceston 11.17 (83) – Att: 966 at North Hobart Oval
- New Norfolk 23.11 (149) v Sandy Bay 19.13 (127) – Att: 1,218 at Queenborough Oval
- Glenorchy 10.14 (74) v Clarence 9.13 (67) – Att: 1,712 at KGV Football Park
- Nth Launceston 17.14 (116) v Nth Hobart 13.10 (88) – Att: 2,096 at York Park
- Devonport 22.17 (149) v Burnie Hawks 10.12 (72) – Att: 2,052 at Devonport Oval

=== Round 4 ===
(Saturday, 20 April 1991)

- Nth Hobart 22.13 (145) v Devonport 14.15 (99) – Att: 1,584 at North Hobart Oval
- Nth Launceston 14.18 (102) v Clarence 10.14 (74) – Att: 1,363 at Bellerive Oval
- Glenorchy 13.13 (91) v New Norfolk 11.11 (77) – Att: 1,857 at Boyer Oval
- Sandy Bay 19.13 (127) v Sth Launceston 14.11 (95) – Att: 697 at York Park
- Burnie Hawks 20.14 (134) v Hobart 16.18 (114) – Att: 826 at West Park Oval

=== Round 5 ===
(Thursday, 25 April & Saturday, 27 April 1991)

- Nth Hobart 17.22 (124) v Hobart 13.8 (86) – Att: 2,461 at North Hobart Oval (Anzac Day)
- Sandy Bay 11.13 (79) v Burnie Hawks 9.11 (65) – Att: 961 at Queenborough Oval
- New Norfolk 19.20 (134) v Sth Launceston 13.8 (86) – Att: 1,388 at Boyer Oval
- Nth Launceston 15.27 (117) v Glenorchy 11.9 (75) – Att: 1,666 at York Park
- Devonport 16.7 (103) v Clarence 13.21 (99) – Att: 1,399 at Devonport Oval

=== Round 6 ===
(Saturday, 4 May 1991)

- Nth Hobart 21.24 (150) v Sandy Bay 17.8 (110) – Att: 1,475 at North Hobart Oval
- Glenorchy 22.13 (145) v Sth Launceston 11.12 (78) – Att: 1,001 at KGV Football Park
- Clarence 13.12 (90) v Hobart 9.15 (69) – Att: 1,744 at Bellerive Oval
- Nth Launceston 16.15 (111) v Devonport 11.7 (73) – Att: 2,277 at York Park
- Burnie Hawks 21.16 (142) v New Norfolk 16.7 (103) – Att: 921 at West Park Oval

=== Round 7 ===
(Saturday, 11 May 1991)

- Nth Launceston 13.11 (89) v Hobart 12.14 (86) – Att: 1,460 at North Hobart Oval
- Clarence 16.19 (115) v Sandy Bay 17.8 (110) – Att: 1,374 at Queenborough Oval
- Nth Hobart 15.14 (104) v New Norfolk 14.15 (99) – Att: 1,577 at Boyer Oval
- Burnie Hawks 27.19 (181) v Sth Launceston 6.12 (48) – Att: 628 at York Park
- Glenorchy 14.6 (90) v Devonport 11.16 (82) – Att: 1,558 at Devonport Oval

=== Round 8 ===
(Saturday, 18 May 1991)

- Nth Hobart 37.24 (246) v Sth Launceston 2.5 (17) – Att: 842 at North Hobart Oval
- Glenorchy 15.17 (107) v Burnie Hawks 12.14 (86) – Att: 1,339 at KGV Football Park
- Clarence 12.22 (94) v New Norfolk 11.15 (81) – Att: 1,920 at Bellerive Oval
- Sandy Bay 17.15 (117) v Nth Launceston 17.13 (115) – Att: 1,335 at York Park
- Devonport 26.15 (171) v Hobart 15.8 (98) – Att: 1,427 at Devonport Oval

=== Round 9 ===
(Saturday, 25 May 1991)

- Glenorchy 17.10 (112) v Hobart 12.16 (88) – Att: 2,269 at North Hobart Oval
- Devonport 19.14 (128) v Sandy Bay 16.11 (107) – Att: 917 at Queenborough Oval
- Nth Launceston 15.18 (108) v New Norfolk 14.9 (93) – Att: 1,248 at Boyer Oval
- Clarence 25.21 (171) v Sth Launceston 10.10 (70) – Att: 614 at York Park
- Nth Hobart 21.26 (152) v Burnie Hawks 15.9 (99) – Att: 1,370 at West Park Oval

=== Round 10 ===
(Saturday, 1 June 1991)

- Nth Hobart 24.20 (164) v Glenorchy 14.15 (99) – Att: 2,395 at North Hobart Oval
- Hobart 18.24 (132) v Sandy Bay 10.12 (72) – Att: 1,044 at Queenborough Oval
- New Norfolk 23.8 (146) v Devonport 16.11 (107) – Att: 1,270 at Boyer Oval
- Nth Launceston 33.16 (214) v Sth Launceston 6.10 (46) – Att: 950 at York Park
- Burnie Hawks 19.8 (122) v Clarence 13.11 (89) – Att: 949 at West Park Oval

=== Round 11 ===
(Saturday, 8 June & Monday, 10 June 1991)

- Hobart 14.18 (102) v New Norfolk 14.12 (96) – Att: 1,973 at North Hobart Oval
- Glenorchy 19.12 (126) v Sandy Bay 13.15 (93) – Att: 1,360 at KGV Football Park
- Devonport 21.16 (142) v Sth Launceston 10.9 (69) – Att: 917 at Devonport Oval
- Clarence 12.7 (79) v Nth Hobart 9.12 (66) – Att: 2,476 at Bellerive Oval (Monday)
- Nth Launceston 24.12 (156) v Burnie Hawks 17.14 (116) – Att: 1,437 at York Park (Monday)

=== Round 12 ===
(Saturday, 22 June & Sunday, 23 June 1991)

- Clarence 13.17 (95) v Glenorchy 10.13 (73) – Att: 2,067 at Bellerive Oval
- New Norfolk 14.16 (100) v Sandy Bay 9.13 (67) – Att: 1,191 at Boyer Oval
- Hobart 21.15 (141) v Sth Launceston 15.14 (104) – Att: 550 at York Park
- Burnie Hawks 13.8 (86) v Devonport 7.13 (55) – Att: 1,602 at West Park Oval
- Nth Launceston 14.16 (100) v Nth Hobart 12.9 (81) – Att: 2,229 at North Hobart Oval (Sunday)

=== Round 13 ===
(Saturday, 29 June 1991)

- Hobart 12.17 (89) v Burnie Hawks 7.11 (53) – Att: 1,047 at North Hobart Oval
- Sandy Bay 22.19 (151) v Sth Launceston 9.10 (64) – Att: 585 at Queenborough Oval
- New Norfolk 17.18 (120) v Glenorchy 10.18 (78) – Att: 2,034 at KGV Football Park
- Clarence 19.15 (129) v Nth Launceston 15.14 (104) – Att: 1,472 at York Park
- Devonport 13.13 (91) v Nth Hobart 12.14 (86) – Att: 1,201 at Devonport Oval

=== Round 14 ===
(Saturday, 6 July & Sunday, 7 July 1991)

- Nth Launceston 21.18 (144) v Glenorchy 14.14 (98) – Att: 1,110 at KGV Football Park
- Clarence 17.13 (115) v Devonport 12.5 (77) – Att: 1,544 at Bellerive Oval
- New Norfolk 22.18 (150) v Sth Launceston 19.9 (123) – Att: 755 at York Park *
- Burnie Hawks 15.10 (100) v Sandy Bay 10.12 (72) – Att: 914 at West Park Oval
- Nth Hobart 23.14 (152) v Hobart 14.13 (97) – Att: 2,225 at North Hobart Oval (Sunday)

Note: Paul Dac (New Norfolk) registers his 100th goal for the season, 26-minutes into the third quarter.

=== Round 15 ===
(Saturday, 13 July & Sunday, 14 July 1991)

- Clarence 21.20 (146) v Hobart 7.11 (53) – Att: 1,791 at North Hobart Oval
- Nth Hobart 15.8 (98) v Sandy Bay 10.12 (72) – Att: 951 at Queenborough Oval
- New Norfolk 22.8 (140) v Burnie Hawks 12.9 (81) – Att: 1,605 at Boyer Oval
- Glenorchy 17.21 (123) v Sth Launceston 15.11 (101) – Att: 598 at York Park
- Nth Launceston 15.11 (101) v Devonport 8.9 (57) – Att: 2,238 at Devonport Oval (Sunday)

=== Round 16 ===
(Saturday, 20 July 1991)

- Nth Hobart 19.16 (130) v New Norfolk 9.11 (65) – Att: 2,049 at North Hobart Oval
- Devonport 11.11 (77) v Glenorchy 8.15 (63) – Att: 1,025 at KGV Football Park
- Clarence 15.11 (101) v Sandy Bay 9.13 (67) – Att: 1,285 at Bellerive Oval
- Nth Launceston 27.17 (179) v Hobart 16.9 (105) – Att: 1,255 at York Park
- Burnie Hawks 20.18 (138) v Sth Launceston 13.10 (88) – Att: 764 at West Park Oval

=== Round 17 ===
(Saturday, 27 July 1991)

- Hobart 21.17 (143) v Devonport 16.9 (105) – Att: 1,633 at North Hobart Oval
- Nth Launceston 20.10 (130) v Sandy Bay 15.11 (101) – Att: 730 at Queenborough Oval
- Clarence 18.8 (116) v New Norfolk 11.15 (81) – Att: 1,633 at Boyer Oval
- Nth Hobart 17.15 (117) v Sth Launceston 3.3 (21) – Att: 512 at York Park
- Burnie Hawks 7.8 (50) v Glenorchy 4.7 (31) – Att: 660 at West Park Oval

=== Round 18 ===
(Saturday, 3 August 1991)

- Nth Hobart 22.15 (147) v Burnie Hawks 14.20 (104) – Att: 1,148 at North Hobart Oval
- Glenorchy 21.7 (133) v Hobart 8.17 (65) – Att: 1,492 at KGV Football Park
- Clarence 28.24 (192) v Sth Launceston 8.5 (53) – Att: 820 at Bellerive Oval
- Nth Launceston 8.8 (56) v New Norfolk 4.12 (36) – Att: 875 at York Park
- Devonport 8.10 (58) v Sandy Bay 2.4 (16) – Att: 698 at Devonport Oval

=== Round 19 ===
(Saturday, 10 August 1991)

- Sandy Bay 13.10 (88) v Hobart 12.14 (86) – Att: 1,072 at North Hobart Oval
- Nth Hobart 24.16 (160) v Glenorchy 13.12 (90) – Att: 1,946 at KGV Football Park
- Clarence 19.25 (139) v Burnie Hawks 8.14 (62) – Att: 1,295 at Bellerive Oval
- Nth Launceston 23.20 (158) v Sth Launceston 9.9 (63) – Att: 875 at York Park
- New Norfolk 22.14 (146) v Devonport 11.6 (72) – Att: 1,128 at Devonport Oval

=== Round 20 ===
(Saturday, 17 August 1991)

- Clarence 17.13 (115) v Nth Hobart 15.12 (102) – Att: 2,767 at North Hobart Oval
- Sandy Bay 10.19 (79) v Glenorchy 11.13 (79) – Att: 921 at Queenborough Oval
- Hobart 12.15 (87) v New Norfolk 12.9 (81) – Att: 1,592 at Boyer Oval
- Sth Launceston 12.25 (97) v Devonport 11.10 (76) – Att: 612 at Youngtown Memorial Ground *
- Burnie Hawks 18.12 (120) v Nth Launceston 8.14 (62) – Att: 937 at West Park Oval

Notes: South Launceston breaks a 34-match losing streak, their match was transferred to Youngtown due to groundsman's tractor being bogged on York Park.

=== Round 21 ===
(Saturday, 24 August 1991)

- Hobart 30.16 (196) v Sth Launceston 14.12 (96) – Att: 843 at North Hobart Oval
- Sandy Bay 16.10 (106) v New Norfolk 15.8 (98) – Att: 960 at Queenborough Oval
- Clarence 18.9 (117) v Glenorchy 12.14 (86) – Att: 2,040 at KGV Football Park
- Nth Hobart 13.10 (88) v Nth Launceston 11.14 (80) – Att: 2,030 at York Park
- Burnie Hawks 18.9 (117) v Devonport 7.11 (53) – Att: 2,115 at Devonport Oval

=== Qualifying Final ===
(Saturday, 30 August 1991)

- Clarence: 2.1 (13) | 7.6 (48) | 10.10 (70) | 13.18 (96)
- Nth Hobart: 0.2 (2) | 2.2 (14) | 6.2 (38) | 9.6 (60)
- Attendance: 4,052 at North Hobart Oval

=== Elimination Final ===
(Sunday, 1 September 1991)

- Burnie Hawks: 4.5 (29) | 14.8 (92) | 15.12 (102) | 20.19 (139)
- Hobart: 2.4 (16) | 3.6 (24) | 11.10 (76) | 14.11 (95)
- Attendance: 2,705 at Devonport Oval

=== First Semi Final ===
(Sunday, 7 September 1991)

- Nth Hobart: 6.4 (40) | 10.12 (72) | 11.21 (87) | 17.23 (125)
- Burnie Hawks: 2.0 (12) | 4.3 (27) | 8.8 (56) | 10.12 (72)
- Attendance: 3,022 at North Hobart Oval

=== Second Semi Final ===
(Saturday, 6 September 1991)

- Nth Launceston: 3.3 (21) | 9.4 (58) | 14.5 (89) | 15.11 (101)
- Clarence: 1.6 (12) | 5.10 (40) | 8.12 (60) | 13.14 (92)
- Attendance: 4,398 at York Park

=== Preliminary Final ===
(Saturday, 13 September 1991)

- Nth Hobart: 7.7 (49) | 8.12 (60) | 12.16 (88) | 14.19 (103)
- Clarence: 1.2 (8) | 4.7 (31) | 6.11 (47) | 11.16 (82)
- Attendance: 5,649 at North Hobart Oval

=== Grand Final ===
(Saturday, 20 September 1991) (ABC-TV highlights: 1991 TFL Grand Final)

- Nth Hobart: 2.5 (17) | 5.7 (37) | 7.9 (51) | 12.14 (86)
- Nth Launceston: 2.2 (14) | 7.7 (49) | 7.11 (53) | 8.12 (60)
- Attendance: 13,112 at North Hobart Oval

Sources: All scores and statistics courtesy of The Mercury and Sunday Tasmanian newspapers.
