= Pettiona =

Pettiona is a surname. Notable people with the surname include:

- Cecil Pettiona (1906–1987), Australian rules footballer
- Charlie Pettiona (1913–1946), Australian rules footballer
- Robert Pettiona (1915–1980), Australian politician
