= 1998 TFL Statewide League season =

- Teams: 8
- Premiers: Northern Bombers
- Minor premiers: Northern Bombers; 5th minor premiership

Attendance
- Matches played: 78
- Total attendance: 119,663 (1,534 per match)

The 1998 TFL Statewide League season was the 115th season of the TFL Statewide League (TSFSL), the highest-level senior Australian rules football competition in Tasmania. This was the final season under the TSFSL name (also known as the Chickenfeed Super League because of a sponsorship agreement with Chickenfeed). The season began on 4 April and concluded on 20 September, comprising an 18-match home-and-away season, followed by a four-week finals series.

The North Launceston Robins renamed themselves as the Northern Bombers from this season and a new club, Southern Districts Cats were admitted into the competition from this season.

== Participating Clubs ==
- Burnie Dockers Football Club
- Clarence District Football Club
- Devonport Power Football Club
- Glenorchy District Football Club
- New Norfolk District Football Club
- North Hobart Football Club
- Northern Bombers Football Club
- Southern Districts Football Club

=== TFL Club Debts ===
At the completion of the 1998 TFL Season it was disclosed as to the extent of the perilous financial situation the clubs in the competition had found themselves in.

The following is an official list of club debts released by the TFL to the Hobart Mercury.

Burnie Dockers ($735,819), Devonport ($709,067), New Norfolk ($431,858), Glenorchy ($267,897), North Hobart ($232,607), Northern Bombers ($167,570), Clarence ($153,441), Southern Districts ($80,000).

With the debt level continuing to rise, the League were continuing to raise the issue of cutbacks of participating clubs and changes to a possible Summer start in a bid to lift the flagging image of the TFL which was suffering from deep financial problems and poor attendances.

=== 1998 TFL Statewide League Club Coaches ===
- Darren Winter (Burnie Dockers)
- Grant Fagan (Clarence)
- Max Brown (Devonport Power)
- Paul Hamilton (Glenorchy)
- Rod Grinter & Craig Stevenson (New Norfolk)
- John McCarthy (North Hobart)
- Matthew Armstrong (Northern Bombers)
- Troy Clarke (Southern Districts)

=== TFL Statewide League Reserves Grand Final ===
- Burnie Dockers 11.19 (85) v Northern Bombers 10.9 (69) – North Hobart Oval

=== TFL Statewide League Colts (Under-19's) Grand Final ===
- Clarence 10.13 (73) v Devonport Power 5.6 (36) – North Hobart Oval

=== Leading Goalkickers: TFL Statewide League ===
- Ken Rainsford (Devonport Power) – 94
- Michael McGregor (Southern Districts) – 59
- Mark Colegrave (Clarence) – 58
- Jason Gibson (Northern Bombers) – 56

=== Medal Winners ===
- Wayne Weidemann (Devonport Power) – William Leitch Medal
- Brendon Bolton (Northern Bombers) – Darrel Baldock Medal (Best player in TFL Grand Final)
- Matthew Armstrong (Northern Bombers) – TFL Coaches Award
- Nick Barnes (Burnie Dockers) – George Watt Medal (Reserves)
- Chris Gracogna (Northern Bombers) – V.A Geard Medal (Under-19's)
- Andrew McLean (Northern Bombers) & Errol Bourne (Burnie Dockers) – Lefroy Medal (Best player/s Interstate match)

=== Interstate Matches ===
Interstate Match (Saturday, 6 June 1998)

- Tasmania 13.10 (88) v Victorian FL 6.17 (53) – Att: 2,532 at North Hobart Oval

=== 1998 TFL Club Home Attendance Figures ===
- Devonport: 16,585 for 9 matches at 1,842
- Burnie Dockers: 16,273 for 9 matches at 1,808
- Northern Bombers: 13,966 for 9 matches at 1,551
- Clarence: 12,361 for 9 matches at 1,373
- Southern Districts: 9,497 for 9 matches at 1,055
- Glenorchy: 9,454 for 9 matches at 1,050
- Nth Hobart: 8,494 for 9 matches at 943
- New Norfolk: 7,706 for 9 matches at 856

== 1998 TFL Statewide League Ladder ==
Pos	Team	Pld	W	L	D	PF	PA	PP	Pts
1	Northern Bombers	18	18	0	0	1922	1209	159.0	72
2	Devonport Power	18	13	5	0	2061	1365	151.0	52
3	Burnie Dockers	18	13	5	0	1691	1356	124.7	52
4	Clarence	18	12	6	0	1978	1461	135.4	48
5	Southern Districts	18	6	12	0	1512	1795	84.2	24
6	Glenorchy	18	5	13	0	1521	1652	92.1	20
7	North Hobart	18	4	14	0	1205	1961	61.4	16
8	New Norfolk	18	1	17	0	1117	2208	50.6	4

=== Round 1 ===
(Saturday, 4 April, Sunday, 5 April & Saturday, 11 April 1998)

- Northern Bombers 20.16 (136) v New Norfolk 11.10 (76) – Att: 1,340 at York Park (4 April)
- Nth Hobart 12.6 (78) v Southern Districts 9.19 (73) – Att: 1,558 at North Hobart Oval (5 April)
- Burnie Dockers 13.10 (88) v Devonport 12.13 (85) – Att: 3,152 at Devonport Oval (5 April)
- Clarence 18.4 (112) v Glenorchy 16.10 (106) – Att: 1,455 at Bellerive Oval (11 April)

=== Round 2 ===
(Saturday, 18 April 1998)

- Clarence 18.8 (116) v Nth Hobart 10.9 (69) – Att: 1,398 at North Hobart Oval
- Northern Bombers 18.15 (123) v Glenorchy 9.13 (67) – Att: 1,161 at KGV Football Park
- Devonport 21.10 (136) v New Norfolk 12.8 (80) – Att: 907 at Boyer Oval
- Burnie Dockers 12.19 (91) v Southern Districts 8.12 (60) – Att: 2,251 at West Park Oval (Night)

=== Round 3 ===
(Saturday, 25 April & Sunday, 26 April 1998)

- Clarence 18.13 (121) v Southern Districts 14.12 (96) – Att: 1,510 at Bellerive Oval
- Burnie Dockers 15.13 (103) v New Norfolk 8.11 (59) – Att: 846 at Boyer Oval (Sunday)
- Northern Bombers 20.15 (135) v Nth Hobart 4.5 (29) – Att: 993 at York Park (Sunday)
- Devonport 18.14 (122) v Glenorchy 14.8 (92) – Att: 1,537 at Devonport Oval (Sunday)

=== Round 4 ===
(Saturday, 2 May & Sunday, 3 May 1998)

- Nth Hobart 15.10 (100) v Devonport 14.8 (92) – Att: 654 at North Hobart Oval
- Glenorchy 18.11 (119) v New Norfolk 13.9 (87) – Att: 1,530 at KGV Football Park
- Burnie Dockers 11.15 (81) v Clarence 8.21 (69) – Att: 1,887 at West Park Oval
- Northern Bombers 14.16 (100) v Southern Districts 11.10 (76) – Att: 912 at North Hobart Oval (Sunday)

=== Round 5 ===
(Saturday, 9 May 1998)

- Burnie Dockers 14.18 (102) v Glenorchy 10.9 (69) – Att: 817 at North Hobart Oval
- Nth Hobart 13.9 (87) v New Norfolk 11.7 (73) – Att: 952 at Boyer Oval
- Northern Bombers 16.12 (108) v Clarence 13.8 (86) – Att: 1,276 at York Park
- Devonport 22.10 (142) v Southern Districts 6.9 (45) – Att: 1,044 at Devonport Oval

=== Round 6 ===
(Saturday, 16 May & Sunday, 17 May 1998)

- Clarence 30.21 (201) v New Norfolk 4.8 (32) – Att: 1,494 at Bellerive Oval
- Burnie Dockers 18.17 (125) v Nth Hobart 11.11 (77) – Att: 1,425 at West Park Oval
- Glenorchy 15.20 (110) v Southern Districts 16.8 (104) – Att: 2,038 at Huonville Recreation Ground (Sunday)
- Northern Bombers 14.22 (106) v Devonport 5.9 (39) – Att: 2,149 at Devonport Oval (Sunday)

=== Round 7 ===
(Saturday, 23 May & Sunday, 24 May 1998)

- Southern Districts 27.20 (182) v New Norfolk 6.12 (48) – Att: 1,015 at North Hobart Oval
- Clarence 16.17 (113) v Devonport 17.6 (108) – Att: 988 at Bellerive Oval
- Northern Bombers 7.15 (57) v Burnie Dockers 5.9 (39) – Att: 2,024 at York Park
- Nth Hobart 7.13 (55) v Glenorchy 7.10 (52) – Att: 1,335 at North Hobart Oval (Sunday)

=== Round 8 ===
(Saturday, 30 May & Sunday, 31 May 1998)

- Southern Districts 11.11 (77) v Nth Hobart 10.15 (75) – Att: 883 at North Hobart Oval
- Clarence 11.18 (84) v Glenorchy 6.9 (45) – Att: 1,127 at KGV Football Park
- Northern Bombers 17.10 (112) v New Norfolk 8.7 (55) – Att: 686 at Boyer Oval
- Devonport 17.12 (114) v Burnie Dockers 12.8 (80) – Att: 3,275 at West Park Oval (Sunday)

=== Round 9 ===
(Saturday, 13 June 1998)

- Burnie Dockers 24.13 (157) v Southern Districts 8.6 (54) – Att: 754 at North Hobart Oval
- Clarence 21.22 (148) v Nth Hobart 7.6 (48) – Att: 1,293 at Bellerive Oval
- Northern Bombers 14.17 (101) v Glenorchy 10.5 (65) – Att: 1,138 at York Park
- Devonport 19.12 (126) v New Norfolk 6.12 (48) – Att: 863 at Devonport Oval

=== Round 10 ===
(Saturday, 20 June & Sunday, 21 June 1998)

- Northern Bombers 17.12 (114) v Nth Hobart 9.11 (65) – Att: 890 at North Hobart Oval
- Devonport 12.12 (84) v Glenorchy 11.11 (77) – Att: 788 at KGV Football Park
- Burnie Dockers 20.14 (134) v New Norfolk 8.8 (56) – Att: 1,009 at West Park Oval
- Clarence 20.17 (137) v Southern Districts 8.15 (63) – Att: 940 at North Hobart Oval (Sunday)

=== Round 11 ===
(Saturday, 27 June 1998)

- Burnie Dockers 20.9 (129) v Clarence 17.16 (118) – Att: 1,336 at Bellerive Oval
- Glenorchy 11.18 (84) v New Norfolk 8.13 (61) – Att: 1,130 at Boyer Oval
- Northern Bombers 20.18 (138) v Southern Districts 11.12 (78) – Att: 865 at York Park
- Devonport 26.15 (171) v Nth Hobart 5.14 (44) – Att: 1,089 at Devonport Oval

=== Round 12 ===
(Saturday, 4 July & Sunday, 5 July 1998)

- Devonport 15.20 (110) v Southern Districts 15.7 (97) – Att: 613 at North Hobart Oval
- Northern Bombers 15.8 (98) v Clarence 13.15 (93) – Att: 1,689 at Bellerive Oval
- Burnie Dockers 14.15 (99) v Glenorchy 10.12 (72) – Att: 1,407 at West Park Oval
- New Norfolk 14.12 (96) v Nth Hobart 10.19 (79) – Att: 971 at North Hobart Oval (Sunday)

=== Round 13 ===
(Saturday, 11 July, Sunday, 12 July, Saturday, 18 July & Sunday, 19 July 1998)

- Southern Districts 13.7 (85) v Glenorchy 11.16 (82) – Att: 1,018 at KGV Football Park (11 July)
- Clarence 15.11 (101) v New Norfolk 9.6 (60) – Att: 962 at Boyer Oval (12 July)
- Burnie Dockers 15.9 (99) v Nth Hobart 12.9 (81) – Att: 734 at North Hobart Oval (18 July)
- Northern Bombers 15.10 (100) v Devonport 14.15 (99) – Att: 3,889 at York Park (19 July)

=== Round 14 ===
(Saturday, 25 July & Sunday, 26 July 1998)

- Glenorchy 19.11 (125) v Nth Hobart 13.10 (88) – Att: 1,173 at KGV Football Park
- Southern Districts 17.17 (119) v New Norfolk 11.8 (74) – Att: 870 at Boyer Oval
- Devonport 19.14 (128) v Clarence 14.18 (102) – Att: 1,501 at Devonport Oval
- Northern Bombers 16.15 (111) v Burnie Dockers 15.8 (98) – Att: 2,599 at West Park Oval (Sunday)

=== Round 15 ===
(Saturday, 1 August & Sunday, 2 August 1998)

- Southern Districts 10.16 (76) v Nth Hobart 8.13 (61) – Att: 956 at North Hobart Oval
- Clarence 17.11 (113) v Glenorchy 9.14 (68) – Att: 1,544 at Bellerive Oval
- Northern Bombers 16.6 (102) v New Norfolk 12.11 (83) – Att: 849 at York Park
- Devonport 15.6 (96) v Burnie Dockers 8.5 (53) – Att: 3,911 at Devonport Oval (Sunday)

=== Round 16 ===
(Saturday, 8 August 1998)

- Clarence 21.16 (142) v Nth Hobart 14.10 (94) – Att: 949 at North Hobart Oval
- Northern Bombers 13.8 (86) v Glenorchy 10.10 (70) – Att: 955 at KGV Football Park
- Devonport 25.17 (167) v New Norfolk 5.6 (36) – Att: 754 at Boyer Oval
- Burnie Dockers 14.21 (105) v Southern Districts 12.13 (85) – Att: 1,205 at West Park Oval

=== Round 17 ===
(Saturday, 15 August 1998)

- Southern Districts 14.14 (98) v Clarence 12.12 (84) – Att: 1,052 at Bellerive Oval
- Burnie Dockers 11.12 (78) v New Norfolk 8.7 (55) – Att: 599 at Boyer Oval
- Northern Bombers 15.13 (103) v Nth Hobart 7.5 (47) – Att: 1,592 at York Park
- Devonport 14.14 (98) v Glenorchy 11.10 (76) – Att: 1,339 at Devonport Oval

=== Round 18 ===
(Saturday, 22 August & Sunday, 23 August 1998)

- Devonport 21.18 (144) v Nth Hobart 4.4 (28) – Att: 680 at North Hobart Oval
- Glenorchy 21.16 (142) v New Norfolk 5.8 (38) – Att: 885 at KGV Football Park
- Clarence 5.8 (38) v Burnie Dockers 3.12 (30) – Att: 1,215 at West Park Oval
- Northern Bombers 12.10 (82) v Southern Districts 6.8 (44) – Att: 711 at North Hobart Oval (Sunday)

=== Elimination Final ===
(Saturday, 29 August 1998)

- Clarence Roos: 1.4 (10) | 8.10 (58) | 14.15 (99) | 19.18 (132)
- Southern Districts: 2.2 (14) | 4.2 (26) | 5.5 (35) | 11.7 (73)
- Attendance: 2,243 at North Hobart Oval

=== Qualifying Final ===
(Sunday, 30 August 1998)

- Devonport Power: 2.1 (13) | 7.4 (46) | 8.8 (56) | 11.18 (84)
- Burnie Dockers: 2.3 (15) | 4.4 (28) | 5.4 (34) | 8.5 (53)
- Attendance: 5,576 at Devonport Oval

=== First Semi Final ===
(Saturday, 5 September 1998)

- Clarence Roos: 7.2 (44) | 8.3 (51) | 13.5 (83) | 17.10 (112)
- Burnie Dockers: 2.0 (12) | 5.4 (34) | 6.4 (40) | 11.6 (72)
- Attendance: 2,041 at North Hobart Oval

=== Second Semi Final ===
(Sunday, 6 September 1998)

- Northern Bombers: 3.3 (21) | 8.5 (53) | 8.8 (56) | 14.13 (97)
- Devonport Power: 2.2 (14) | 3.4 (22) | 4.7 (31) | 6.8 (44)
- Attendance: 3,892 at York Park

=== Preliminary Final ===
(Sunday, 13 September 1998)

- Clarence Roos: 0.5 (5) | 4.7 (31) | 10.12 (72) | 12.13 (85)
- Devonport Power: 3.3 (21) | 4.4 (28) | 4.6 (30) | 7.8 (50)
- Attendance: 1,937 at North Hobart Oval

=== Grand Final ===
(Sunday, 20 September 1998)

- Northern Bombers: 2.8 (20) | 5.11 (41) | 10.14 (74) | 14.16 (100)
- Clarence Roos: 0.4 (4) | 0.8 (8) | 4.12 (36) | 6.15 (51)
- Attendance: 9,638 at North Hobart Oval

Source: All scores and statistics courtesy of the Hobart Mercury, Launceston Examiner and North West Advocate publications.
