= 2022 TSL season =

130th season of the Tasmanian State League

- Date: 26 March − 17 September 2022
- Teams: 7
- Premiers: Launceston; 4th premiership
- Minor premiers: Launceston
- Alistair Lynch Medallist: Sam Siggins (Lauderdale − 30 votes)
- Peter Hudson Medallist: Colin Garland (Clarence − 59 goals)

The 2022 TSL season was the 130th season of the Tasmanian State League (TSL), the highest-level senior Australian rules football competition in Tasmania. The season began on 26 March and concluded on 17 September, comprising an 18-match home-and-away season over 21 rounds, followed by a three-week finals series.

Launceston won the TSL premiership for the fourth time and the third year in a row, defeating Kingborough by 72 points in the 2022 TSL Grand Final.

== Ladder ==
| Pos | Team | Pld | W | L | D | PF | PA | PP | Pts | Qualification |
|---|---|---|---|---|---|---|---|---|---|---|
| 1 | Launceston (P) | 18 | 17 | 1 | 0 | 2136 | 797 | 268.0 | 68 | Finals series |
| 2 | Kingborough | 18 | 13 | 5 | 0 | 1460 | 1143 | 127.7 | 52 | Finals series |
| 3 | Clarence | 18 | 11 | 7 | 0 | 1456 | 1086 | 134.1 | 44 | Finals series |
| 4 | Lauderdale | 18 | 10 | 8 | 0 | 1441 | 1208 | 119.3 | 40 | Finals series |
| 5 | North Launceston | 18 | 9 | 9 | 0 | 1438 | 1208 | 119.0 | 36 | |
| 6 | North Hobart | 18 | 3 | 15 | 0 | 1026 | 1767 | 58.1 | 12 | |
| 7 | Glenorchy | 18 | 0 | 18 | 0 | 586 | 2334 | 25.1 | 0 | |

Rules for classification: 1) points; 2) percentage; 3) number of points for.
(P) Premiers

== Finals ==
=== Qualifying and elimination finals ===
| | Elimination final |
| Saturday, 3 September (2:00 pm) | Clarence 4.11 (35) | def. | Lauderdale 3.12 (30) | Twin Ovals |

| | Qualifying final |
| Saturday, 3 September (2:15 pm) | Launceston 19.19 (133) | def. | Kingborough 6.6 (42) | Windsor Park |

=== Preliminary final ===
| | Preliminary final |
| Saturday, 10 September (2:30 pm) | Kingborough 11.13 (79) | def. | Clarence 11.8 (74) | Twin Ovals |

=== Grand Final ===
2022 TSL Grand Final
Saturday, 17 September (3:00 pm) | Launceston | def. | Kingborough
4.1 (25); 7.5 (47); 10.10 (70); 16.14 (110) | Q1; Q2; Q3; Final | 0.1 (1); 1.3 (9); 2.5 (17); 5.8 (38)
Hinds 4, Riley 4, Palfreyman 3, Thurlow 2, Gillow, Musicka, Tyrrell | Goals | Lane 3, Golding, Graham
Seymour, Hinds, Palfreyman, Harper, Woolley, Tyrrell | Best | Clifford, Lane, Donnelly, Adams, Gardner, Sawdy

== Awards ==
- Sam Siggins (Lauderdale) won the Alistair Lynch Medal as the TSL's best and fairest player for the second season in a row, finishing with 30 votes.
- Colin Garland (Clarence) won the Peter Hudson Medal as the leading goalkicker, finishing the home-and-away season with 59 goals.

=== Club best and fairest ===
| Club | Winner | Ref |
|---|---|---|
| Clarence | Baxter Norton | |
| Glenorchy | Josh Arnold | |
| Glenorchy | Blake Waight | |
| Kingborough | Kieran Lovell | |
| Lauderdale | Sam Siggins | |
| Launceston | Fletcher Seymour | |
| North Hobart | Nick Jackson | |
| North Launceston | Jack Avent | |
| North Launceston | Alex Lee | |
