= Robert Withers =

Robert Withers may refer to:

- Robert E. Withers, American physician, military officer, newspaperman and politician
- Robert Jewell Withers, English ecclesiastical architect
- Bob Withers, Australian rules footballer
