= 2020 TSL season =

- Teams: 7
- Premiers: Launceston
- Minor premiers: North Launceston
- Wooden spooners: Glenorchy
- Alistair Lynch Medallist: Sam Siggins (Lauderdale)
- Peter Hudson Medallist: Dylan Riley (Launceston) (38 goals)

The 2020 AFL Tasmania TSL premiership season is an Australian rules football competition staged across Tasmania, Australia over twenty-one home and away rounds and four finals series matches between 11 July and 17 October.

== Participating clubs ==
- Clarence District Football Club
- Glenorchy District Football Club
- Lauderdale Football Club
- Launceston Football Club
- North Hobart Football Club
- North Launceston Football Club
- Tigers Football Club

== Ladder ==
Pos	Team	Pld	W	L	D	PF	PA	PP	Pts	Qualification
1	North Launceston	12	11	1	0	851	474	179.5	44	Finals series
2	Launceston (P)	12	9	3	0	793	467	169.8	36	Finals series
3	Lauderdale	12	7	5	0	812	668	121.6	28	Finals series
4	Clarence	12	5	7	0	651	648	100.5	20	Finals series
5	Kingborough Tigers	12	4	8	0	612	914	67.0	16	
6	North Hobart	12	3	9	0	582	759	76.7	12	
7	Glenorchy	12	3	9	0	513	884	58.0	12	

Source: Australian Football
Rules for classification: 1) points; 2) percentage; 3) number of points for.
(P) Premiers

== Finals series ==
=== First semi-final ===
	First Semi Final
Saturday, 10 October (2:00pm)	North Launceston 15.8 (98)	def.	Clarence 3.2 (20)	UTAS Stadium

=== Second semi-final ===
	Second Semi Final
Saturday, 10 October (2:00pm)	Launceston 17.3 (105)	def.	Lauderdale 9.3 (57)	Windsor Park

=== Grand Final ===
2021 TSL Grand Final
Saturday 17 October (2:30 pm)	North Launceston	def. by	Launceston	UTAS Stadium
1.2 (8); 1.6 (12); 3.8 (26); 5.9 (39)	Q1; Q2; Q3; Final	0.0 (0); 3.1 (19); 4.1 (25); 8.4 (52)	Darrel Baldock Medal: Jobi Harper (Launceston)
T. Bennett 2 J. Rushton, B. Cox-Goodyer, J. Callow 1	Goals	J. Harper 2, D. Riley 2, J. Blackberry 2 F. Seymour, J. Dakin 1
B. Cox-Goodyer, B. Lowe, T. Donnelly, T. Whitford, J. Ponting, A. Lee	Best	J. Harper, M. Musicka, T. Jones, D. Riley, F. Seymour, J. House
