= Kevin McLean =

Kevin McLean may refer to:

- Kevin McLean (Australian footballer, born 1942), Australian rules footballer for Collingwood and Hawthorn
- Kevin McLean (Tasmanian footballer), Australian rules footballer for North Launceston
