= North Launceston Football Club =

North Launceston

Names
- Full name: North Launceston Football Club
- Former name: Railway Football Club
- Nickname: Bombers
- Club song: "See the Bombers fly up"

2023 season
- After finals: 2nd
- Home-and-away season: 2nd
- Leading goalkicker: Bradley Cox-Goodyer (58)

Club details
- Founded: 1893; 133 years ago
- Colours
- Competition: Tasmanian State League
- President: Thane Brady
- Coach: Bradley Cox-Goodyer
- Premierships: TSL (8): 1995; 1998; 2014; 2015; 2017; 2018; 2019; 2024; Tasmanian State Premiership (3): 1947; 1949; 1950
- Ground: York Park, Launceston (capacity: 21,000)

Uniforms
Home	Away

The North Launceston Football Club, nicknamed the Bombers, is an Australian rules football club based in the Tasmanian city of Launceston. The club will compete in the Northern Tasmanian Football Association (NTFA) in 2025.

== History ==
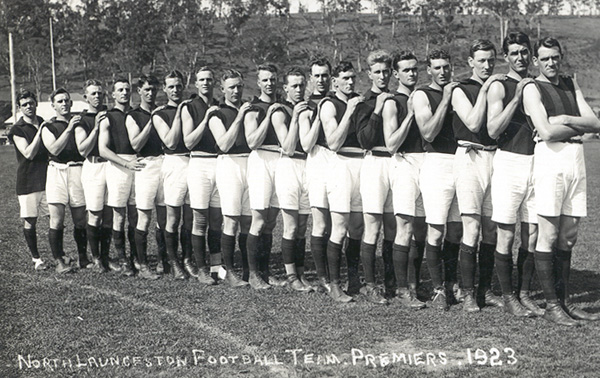
A North Launceston team of 1923.

The club started as "Railway Football Club" in 1893 and were known as "Essendon" in the 1898 season. It fielded a team in the NTFA Junior Competition for three years, and began playing in the senior competition in 1896.

Its first season under the North Launceston name was in 1899 when it played in the Northern Tasmanian Football Association.

The club has remained in the top tier of state competition ever since, playing in the Tasmanian Football League and Northern Tasmanian Football League upon the competition restructures in the state. The club won the Tasmanian State Premiership in 1905 and 1906 (both unofficial), 1947, 1949, 1950, 1995 and 1998.

The club accepted an invitation to join the new Tasmanian State League that commenced in 2009. Since 2014, the club has been a dominant force in the league, reaching every Grand Final between 2014 and 2021 for five premierships: 2014, 2015, 2017, 2018 and 2019.

== Honours ==
- Tasmanian Football League (8): 1995, 1998, (Note: As "Northern Bombers FC") 2014, 2015, 2017, 2018, 2019, 2024
- Tasmanian State Premiership (3): 1947, 1949, 1950

== Seasons ==
Premiers	Grand Finalist	Minor premiers	Finals appearance	Wooden spoon	League leading goalkicker	League best and fairest

=== Men's ===
==== Seniors ====
Year	League	Finish	W	L	D	Coach	Captain	Best and fairest	Leading goalkicker		Ref
1893	NTFA JA										
1894	NTFA JA										
1895	NTFA JA										
1896	NTFA										
1897	NTFA										
1898	NTFA										
1899	NTFA						H. Brown				
1900	NTFA						J. C. Forbes				
1901	NTFA						A. Edwards				
1902	NTFA						A. Edwards				
1903	NTFA						L. W. Findlay				
1904	NTFA					B. Carter	L. W. Findlay				
1905	NTFA					B. Carter	L. W. Findlay				
1906	NTFA					B. Carter	L. W. Findlay				
1907	NTFA					B. Carter	H. Robson				
1908	NTFA						L. W. Findlay				
1909	NTFA						T. Towel				
1910	NTFA					C. J. Searl	D. Munro				
1911	NTFA					C. J. Searl	H. Hutchinson				
1912	NTFA					B. Carter	H. Hutchinson				
1913	NTFA					C. J. Searl	H. Hutchinson				
1914	NTFA						M. Wilson; J. B. Courtney				
1915	NTFA						J. B. Courtney				
1916	NTFA										
1917	NTFA										
1918	NTFA										
1919	NTFA					R. Coogan	A. G. Scott; C. Coogan				
1920	NTFA					L. W. Findlay	R. J. Holyman				
1921	NTFA					L. W. Findlay	G. W. Turner				
1922	NTFA					P. J. Martyn	P. J. Martyn				
1923	NTFA					Hutchinson; Winstanley	G. W. Turner				
1924	NTFA					C. A. Fowler	D. G. Scott				
1925	NTFA					H. H. Sutton	H. H. Sutton				
1926	NTFA					F. J. Odgers	F. J. Odgers	M. Munro			
1927	NTFA					F. J. Odgers	J. Gaitskell	J. Elmer			
1928	NTFA					F. J. Odgers	J. Gaitskell	Raynor Summers			
1929	NTFA					F. J. Odgers	J. Gaitskell	P. Hartnett			
1930	NTFA					Bill Adams	Bill Adams	H. Cunningham			
1931	NTFA					Alan Scott	Alan Scott	L. Healey			
1932	NTFA					Alan Scott	Alan Scott				
1933	NTFA					H. Cunningham	H. Cunningham; Sutherland	H. Dixon			
1934	NTFA					H. Cunningham	H. Cunningham				
1935	NTFA					H. Cunningham	H. Cunningham	H. Cunningham			
1936	NTFA					P. W. Snowball	P. W. Snowball				
1937	NTFA					G. Strang	G. Strang	F. Smith			
1938	NTFA					F. Barnes	F. Barnes; Longhurst	F. Smith			
1939	NTFA					Cecil Pettiona	Cecil Pettiona	F. Smith			
1940	NTFA					Cecil Pettiona	Cecil Pettiona				
1941	NTFA					Joe Sankey	Joe Sankey	F. Horesnail			
1942	NTFA										
1943	NTFA										
1944	NTFA										
1945	NTFA					Gavin Luttrell	Gavin Luttrell	G. Huxley			
1946	NTFA					Gavin Luttrell	Gavin Luttrell	W. Hird			
1947	NTFA					Gavin Luttrell	Gavin Luttrell	M. Mitchell			
1948	NTFA					Gavin Luttrell	Gavin Luttrell	Raynor Summers			
1949	NTFA					Gavin Luttrell	J. Bennett	M. Mitchell			
1950	NTFA					Gavin Luttrell	R. Castles	N. Clarke			
1951	NTFA					Gavin Luttrell	R. Castles	Raynor Summers; W. Hird			
1952	NTFA					Doug Williams	Doug Williams	W. Byrne			
1953	NTFA					John Leedham	John Leedham	W. Byrne			
1954	NTFA					Jack Hawksley	John Leedham	P. Vincent			
1955	NTFA					Jim Ross; Raynor Summers	Jim Ross; Raynor Summers	G. Hawksley			
1956	NTFA					Jim Ross	Jim Ross	Jim Ross			
1957	NTFA					Jim Ross	Jim Ross	R. Dargavel			
1958	NTFA					Raynor Summers	Raynor Summers	R. Apted			
1959	NTFA					Jack Hawksley	Jack Hawksley	W. Manion; Kevin McLean			
1960	NTFA					Bob Withers	Bob Withers	L. Sharp			
1961	NTFA					Bob Withers	Bob Withers	S. Wing			
1962	NTFA					Bob Withers	Bob Withers	Kevin McLean			
1963	NTFA					Bob Withers	Bob Withers	L. Sharp			
1964	NTFA					Bob Withers	Bob Withers	C. Thompson			
1965	NTFA					Bob Withers	Bob Withers	W. Manion			
1966	NTFA					Bob Withers	Bob Withers	W. Manion			
1967	NTFA					Bob Withers	Bob Withers	Kevin McLean			
1968	NTFA					Trevor Somerville	Trevor Somerville				
1969	NTFA					Kevin McLean	Kevin McLean	Kevin McLean			
1970	NTFA					Kevin McLean	Kevin McLean	D. Peck			
1971	NTFA					Kevin McLean	Kevin McLean	P. Sellers			
1972	NTFA					Tony Haenen	Tony Haenen	I. Von Schill			
1973	NTFA					Tony Haenen	Tony Haenen	M. Hawkins			
1974	NTFA					Tony Haenen	Tony Haenen	T. Pickett			
1975	NTFA					Peter Daniel	Peter Daniel	T. Pickett			
1976	NTFA					Peter Daniel	Peter Daniel	R. Spencer			
1977	NTFA					Peter Daniel	Peter Daniel	G. Hunnibell			
1978	NTFA					Peter Daniel	Peter Daniel	N. Maynard			
1979	NTFA					Peter Daniel	Peter Daniel	S. Carey			
1980	NTFA					Peter Daniel	Peter Daniel	A. Downes			
1981	NTFA					Peter Daniel	Peter Daniel	Graeme Hunnibell			
1982	NTFA					Peter Daniel	Peter Daniel	Stephen Hay			
1983	NTFA					Tony Young	Ricky Young	Brett Manion			
1984	NTFA					Tony Young	Ricky Young	Kym Marsh			
1985	NTFA					Tony Young	Ricky Young	Brett Hughes			
1986	NTFA					Robbie Sanders	Jim Smith	Greg Eaves			
1986	TFLSL					Tony Young	Ricky Young	Anthony Brand			
1987	TFLSL					Tony Young	Ricky Young	Mark Evans			
1988	TFLSL					Steve Goulding	Steve Goulding	Chris Whitford			
1989	TFLSL					Steve Goulding	Steve Goulding	Steve Goulding			
1990	TFLSL					Steve Goulding	Steve Goulding	Steve Goulding			
1991	TFLSL					Steve Goulding	Robert Groenewegen	Andrew Dunkley			
1992	TFLSL					Steve Goulding	Robert Groenewegen	Rowen Thorne			
1993	TFLSL					David Rhys-Jones	David Rhys-Jones	Todd Spearman; Craig Davies			
1994	TFLSL					David Rhys-Jones	David Rhys-Jones	Steane Kremerskothen			
1995	TFLSL					David Rhys-Jones	Steane Kremerskothen	Wes Lewis			
1996	TFLSL					Wes Lewis	Steane Kremerskothen	Jason Gibson			
1997	TFLSL					Wes Lewis	Dale Chugg	Steane Kremerskothen			
1998	TFLSL					Matthew Armstrong	Matthew Armstrong	Nathan Howard			
1999	TSFL					Rod Hill	Dale Chugg	Darren Trevena			
2000	SWL					Garry McIntosh	Dale Chugg; Nathan Howard	Michael Praciak			
2001	NTFL					Garry McIntosh	Kym Curtis	Dale O'Neill			
2002	NTFL					Rod Keogh	Kym Curtis	Paul McKendrick			
2003	NTFL					Rod Keogh	Kym Curtis	Kym Curtis			
2004	NTFL					Rod Keogh	Josh Nunn	Robert Gilligan			
2005	NTFL					Rod Keogh	Josh Nunn	G. Dunne			
2006	NTFL					Rod Keogh	Shane Wager	Robert Gilligan			
2007	NTFL					Shane Wager	Shane Wager	Adam Viney			
2008	NTFL					Chris Whitford	Alan O'Sign	Leigh Harding			
2009	TSL					Chris Whitford	Alan O'Sign; Shane Wager	Shane Wager			
2010	TSL					Paul Atkins	Shane Wager	Michael Praciak			
2011	TSL					Jeff Dunne	Shane Wager	Darren Crawford			
2012	TSL					Zane Littlejohn	Darren Crawford	S. Carins			
2013	TSL					Zane Littlejohn					
2014	TSL					Zane Littlejohn			Brad Cox-Goodyer		
2015	TSL					Zane Littlejohn					
2016	TSL					Zane Littlejohn			Brad Cox-Goodyer		
2017	TSL					Tom Couch		Brad Cox-Goodyer	Brad Cox-Goodyer		
2018	TSL					Taylor Whitford			Brad Cox-Goodyer		
2019	TSL					Taylor Whitford			Brad Cox-Goodyer		
2020	TSL					Taylor Whitford					
2021	TSL					Brad Cox-Goodyer		Brad Cox-Goodyer	Brad Cox-Goodyer		
2022	TSL	5th	9	9	0	Brad Cox-Goodyer		Jack Avent; Alex Lee			
2023	TSL	2nd	15	3	0	Brad Cox-Goodyer		Alex Lee; Ben Simpson	Brad Cox-Goodyer	53	
2024	TSL	1st	18	0	0	Adrian Smith			Harvey Griffiths	53	
