= Trevor Somerville =

Australian rules footballer

Personal information
- Born: 18 April 1944
- Died: 22 December 2001 (aged 57)
- Original team: Trafalgar
- Height: 193 cm (6 ft 4 in)
- Weight: 87 kg (192 lb)

Playing career^{1}
Years	Club	Games (Goals)
1963–1967	South Melbourne	49 (4)
- ^{1} Playing statistics correct to the end of 1967.

Trevor Somerville (18 April 1944 – 22 December 2001) was an Australian rules footballer who played with South Melbourne in the Victorian Football League (VFL).

A ruckman, Somerville came to South Melbourne from Latrobe Valley Football League club Trafalgar. He made 49 league appearances for South Melbourne, from 1963 to 1967. In 1968 he coached in the Northern Tasmanian Football Association, at North Launceston. For the next two years he played with and coached Maffra, back in Latrobe Valley, then switched to Sale in 1971 and steered his new club to a premiership that season.

He is the younger brother of Essendon player John Somerville.
