= Tony Haenen =

Australian rules footballer

Personal information
- Full name: Anthony Haenen
- Born: 24 April 1946
- Died: 9 July 2015 (aged 69)
- Original team: Mildura Imperials
- Height: 191 cm (6 ft 3 in)
- Weight: 86 kg (190 lb)
- Positions: Defender, Ruckman

Playing career^{1}
Years	Club	Games (Goals)
1966–1971	South Melbourne	93 (27)
- ^{1} Playing statistics correct to the end of 1971.

Anthony Haenen (24 April 1946 – 9 July 2015) was an Australian rules footballer who played for South Melbourne in the Victorian Football League (VFL).

Haenen was recruited from the Mildura Imperials and gave South Melbourne solid service over six seasons. He finished the 1970 Brownlow Medal count as his club's equal third top vote-getter, the same year he made his only finals appearance.

After the 1971 VFL season, Haenen was appointed captain-coach of North Launceston and led the club for three years. While in Tasmania, he represented the Northern Tasmanian Football Association combined team and he also represented the state at the 1972 Perth Carnival.

He transferred to Port Melbourne in 1975 and was the ruckman in their 1976 premiership side. In the Grand Final he was reported for assaulting a boundary umpire but was cleared in the tribunal. While he was used a ruckman for most of his time at Port Melbourne, Haenen was primarily a defender during his career, usually at centre half back.
