= Kevin McLean (Tasmanian footballer) =

Australian rules footballer

Kevin McLean is a former Australian rules footballer who played in Tasmania from the late 1950s to about 1970 and represented the state in interstate matches. He was inducted into the Tasmanian Football Hall of Fame in 2005.

McLean played for North Launceston in the Northern Tasmanian Football Association (NTFA).

== Honours and achievements ==
Team

- represented Tasmania at 1966 Carnival (Hobart)

NTFA Premiership

- North Launceston 1961, 1963

Individual

- NTFA Best & Fairest: 1962 (eq 2nd), 1963 (winner), 1967 (3rd), 1968 (2nd on countback), 1969 (2nd)
- club Best & Fairest: 1959 (joint winner), 1962 (winner), 1963 (2nd)
