= Bob Withers =

Australian rules footballer

Personal information
- Full name: Lawrence Robert Withers
- Born: 1933 (age 92–93); Victoria
- Original team: St. Peter Paul's
- Position: Centreman

Playing career^{1}
Years	Club	Games (Goals)
1950–59	Port Melbourne	137
1960–67	North Launceston	165
- ^{1} Playing statistics correct to the end of 1967.

Career highlights
- 1961 All-Australian team

Robert Withers (born 1933) is a former Australian rules footballer who played in Tasmania and for Port Melbourne, noted for his selection in the 1961 All-Australian team.

Withers was a regular member of the Port Melbourne side during the 1950s and represented the VFA in 1957, 1958, and 1959.

He moved to Tasmania in 1960 and joined NTFA club North Launceston as captain-coach, steering the club to premierships in 1961 and 1963.

In his first year at North Launceston he played in the Tasmanian interstate team that scored its first-ever win against a VFL team on 13 June 1960.

He represented Tasmania on 15 occasions in total and was an All-Australian at the 1961 Brisbane Carnival. Twice, in games against the VFA, Withers captained Tasmania and he won a Lefroy Medal in 1963.

His coaching career continued after he has retired as a player; and he was in charge of Launceston when they won the 1969 premiership. Withers also served as assistant coach of Essendon in 1970, and later was coach of both Devonport and East Devonport.
