= Peter Daniel (Australian footballer) =

Australian rules footballer and coach

Personal information
- Full name: Peter Russell Daniel
- Born: 17 September 1947 (age 79); Broome, Western Australia
- Original team: Woori Yallock
- Height: 188 cm (6 ft 2 in)
- Weight: 86 kg (190 lb)
- Position: Key position

Playing career^{1}
Years	Club	Games (Goals)
1968–74	Essendon	100 (54)
- ^{1} Playing statistics correct to the end of 1974.

Peter Russell Daniel (born 17 September 1947) is a former Australian rules footballer who played for Essendon in the Victorian Football League (VFL).

Daniel spent most of 1968 in the Essendon reserves, where he played in a premiership team. The Woori Yallock recruit featured more prominently in 1969 and kicked 32 goals, including a couple of six goal hauls. In the subsequent seasons he was used mainly as a full-back. At Moorabbin Oval, against St Kilda, late in the 1974 VFL season, Daniel made his 100th and last league appearance. It was also the debut of future Essendon 378 gamer Simon Madden.

He was appointed captain-coach of Northern Tasmanian Football Association club North Launceston in 1975 and steered them to five premierships. During this time he was a Tasmanian interstate representative and played in the 1975 Knockout Carnival. He also captain-coached the state at the 1980 Adelaide State of Origin Carnival.

In 1983 he became coach of Subiaco in the West Australian Football League but didn't last the season after a string of poor results. He then coached again in Tasmania, this time with City-South.

His final coaching stint at senior level came with the Clarence Football Club in the TFL Statewide League in 1989–1990 where he was dumped as coach after the Roos crashed out of the finals both years.

Daniel was inducted into the Tasmanian Football Hall of Fame in 2005.

He is the father of former ABC Washington DC bureau chief and Member for Goldstein Zoe Daniel.

He began teaching in 1968, when he graduated from Toorak Teachers College, later Deakin University's Malvern Campus. He later obtained a Bachelor of Education degree from the University of Tasmania in 1996. His teaching career spanned three states and more than forty years.
