= Steve Goulding (footballer) =

Personal information
- Full name: Steven Ronald Goulding
- Born: 18 August 1960 (age 66)
- Original team: North Launceston
- Height: 185 cm (6 ft 1 in)
- Weight: 81 kg (179 lb)
- Position: Midfielder

Playing career^{1}
Years	Club	Games (Goals)
1981	North Melbourne	2 (2)
1982–87	Claremont	123 (194)
- ^{1} Playing statistics correct to the end of 1988.

Steve Goulding (born 18 August 1960) is an English former Australian rules footballer who played for North Melbourne in the Victorian Football League (VFL).

Goulding was recruited to the VFL from NTFA club North Launceston after being a member of their 1979 premiership team. He played two senior games mid season, a 114-point loss to Geelong at Kardinia Park and he kicked two goals the following week against Richmond, for whom Francis Bourke was making his 300th league appearance.

An on-baller and centreman, Goulding joined Claremont in 1982 and spent six seasons there, during which time he was a Western Australian interstate player. He also represented Tasmania at the 1988 Adelaide Bicentennial Carnival and in 1988 he finished his career back at North Launceston, turning the Robins into a powerful combination where he was captain-coach until 1990, where he won the 'ABC Footballer of the Year' award despite missing many games mid-season due to a knee injury.

After a stellar finals series, Goulding badly injured his other knee in the opening minutes of the 1990 TFL Grand Final against Hobart and subsequently retired as a player but remained non-playing coach of the Robins until the end of the 1992 season where his highly fancied North Launceston team were beaten by Hobart in the Preliminary Final.

He won the 1989, and also 1990 North Launceston 'Best and Fairest' awards.

Goulding also coached Deloraine in the Northern Tasmanian Football League.

He was a 2008 inductee into the Tasmanian Football Hall of Fame.

Goulding's son, Chris, is a basketball player in the National Basketball League.
