= Cecil Pettiona =

Australian rules footballer (1906–1987)

Personal information
- Full name: Cecil William Pettiona
- Born: 7 March 1906; South Melbourne, Victoria
- Died: 26 April 1987 (aged 81); Glenorchy, Tasmania
- Height: 173 cm (5 ft 8 in)
- Weight: 73 kg (161 lb)

Playing career^{1}
Years	Club	Games (Goals)
1927–1934	South Melbourne	78 (15)
1936–1937	North Hobart	? (?)
1938	Lefroy	? (?)
1939–1941	North Launceston	? (?)
1945	New Town	? (?)
- ^{1} Playing statistics correct to the end of 1945.

Cecil William Pettiona (7 March 1906 – 26 April 1987) was an Australian rules footballer who played with South Melbourne in the Victorian Football League (VFL).

Pettiona, the son of a Sardinian migrant, was recruited locally by South Melbourne. He played as a half forward flanker and wingman. Over the course of eight seasons, Pettiona appeared in 78 games for South Melbourne. Injury kept him out of South Melbourne's 1933 premiership team.

Pettiona spent the next part of his career in Tasmania. He was playing coach of the North Hobart side which won both the TANFL premiership and Tasmanian State Premiership in 1936. He led them to the grand final again in 1937, but on this occasion they were defeated by Lefroy, the club he would play for the following year. In 1939 he went to North Launceston as playing coach, where he remained for three seasons. He next coached Long Beach, before joining New Town in 1945, as captain-coach.

Pettiona was an accomplished athlete, winning the 1931 Wangaratta Gift.

His nephew, Charlie Pettiona, also played for South Melbourne.
