= Charlie Pettiona =

Australian rules footballer

Personal information
- Full name: Charles Joseph Pettiona
- Born: 10 July 1913; South Melbourne, Victoria
- Died: 23 October 1946 (aged 33); South Melbourne, Victoria
- Original team: Port Melbourne
- Height: 177 cm (5 ft 10 in)
- Weight: 75 kg (165 lb)

Playing career^{1}
Years	Club	Games (Goals)
1935	Port Melbourne (VFA)	9 (0)
1936–1937	South Melbourne	14 (0)
1939–1941	Sandringham (VFA)	37 (2)
- ^{1} Playing statistics correct to the end of 1937.

Charles Joseph "Laddie" Pettiona (10 July 1913 – 23 October 1946) was an Australian rules footballer who played with South Melbourne in the Victorian Football League (VFL).

== Family ==
The son of Thomas Joseph Pettiona (1890–1950), and Annie Maud Pettiona (1895–1966), née Janman, Charles Joseph Pettiona was born at South Melbourne, Victoria on 10 July 1913.

He married Gladwyn Greenway (1915–), later Mrs. William Charles Young, on 9 October 1937. They had two children.

== Football ==
Pettiona, a Port Melbourne recruit, started out at South Melbourne in 1936, two years after his uncle Cecil Pettiona had played for the club.

He made eight appearances in the 1936 VFL season, which included South Melbourne's grand final loss to Collingwood (as 19th man), his first loss in South Melbourne colours.

In 1937 he played six senior games, then didn't appear at all in the 1938 season and was cleared to Sandringham.

== Death ==
On the evening of 23 October 1946 Pettiona was struck and killed by a military truck while cycling down Normanby Road in South Melbourne.
