= Rod Keogh =

Australian rules footballer

Personal information
- Born: 25 March 1971 (age 55)
- Original team: Castlemaine (Bendigo FL)
- Draft: No. 27, 1988 national draft
- Height: 180 cm (5 ft 11 in)
- Weight: 83 kg (183 lb)

Playing career^{1}
| Years | Club | Games (Goals) |
| 1989–1993 | Melbourne | 22 (8) |
| 1994–1998 | St Kilda | 60 (21) |
| Total | | 82 (29) |
- ^{1} Playing statistics correct to the end of 1998.

Career highlights
- 1990 & 1993 VFL Reserves Best & Fairest: Gardiner Medal; Harold Ball Memorial Trophy: 1990

Rod Keogh (born 25 March 1971) is a former Australian rules footballer who played for the Melbourne Football Club and St Kilda Football Club in the Australian Football League (AFL).

Keogh usually played in the midfield or at half forward and was recruited to Melbourne from Castlemaine. He made his league debut in 1990 but spent most of the season with the reserves where he won a Gardiner Medal. In 1993 he won another Gardiner Medal after failing to play a senior game that year. He moved to St Kilda in 1994 and was a member of their 1997 grand final losing side. Keogh was delisted at the end of the 1998 season.
