= Matthew Armstrong (Australian footballer) =

Australian rules footballer

Personal information
- Born: 1 March 1967 (age 59)
- Original team: Hobart (TFL Statewide)
- Draft: No. 24, 1986 national draft
- Height: 177 cm (5 ft 10 in)
- Weight: 76 kg (168 lb)

Playing career^{1}
Years	Club	Games (Goals)
1987–1994	Fitzroy	132 (71)
1995–1996	North Melbourne	43 (18)
Total		175 (89)
- ^{1} Playing statistics correct to the end of 1996.

Matthew Armstrong (born 1 March 1967) is a former Australian rules footballer who played with Fitzroy and North Melbourne in the VFL/AFL. He was a regular interstate representative for his home state of Tasmania.

Originally from Tasmanian Football League club Hobart, Fitzroy drafted Armstrong with the 24th pick of the 1986 VFL draft. Making his senior debut for in 1987, Armstrong played 132 games for Fitzroy before moving to North Melbourne ahead of the 1995 AFL season.

Playing throughout the midfield and half back, Armstrong was the season's second highest disposal getter for North Melbourne. Despite missing just five games in the 1996 home and away season he was omitted from the side which defeated Sydney in the grand final.

He was sometimes involved in spectacular solo efforts to win games breaking out of the centre melee with a direct run at goal, but would only do so at the end of close games. Otherwise he was frequently unnoticed on the field, perhaps due to his relatively short stature or perhaps mainly to the blink-fast speed of his disposal of the ball, usually to great effect.

He seemed to show a singular strategic sense and his handspeed resulted in an unparalleled ability to break lines of defence and an uncanny number of plays involving or commencing with him resulted in scoring shots, sometimes several disposals later. This ability was recognized by teammates but often overlooked by coaches and selectors; testified to by Wayne Carey making special mention of the non-selected Matthew Armstrong in his 1996 Premiership Cup acceptance speech.

He later became coach of the Tasmanian Devils Football Club.
