= Mitch Thorp =

Australian rules footballer

Personal information
- Full name: Mitchell Thorp
- Born: 25 December 1988 (age 37)
- Original team: Tassie Mariners / Northern Bombers
- Draft: No. 6, 2006 national draft
- Debut: Round 15, 2007, Hawthorn vs. Richmond, at Melbourne Cricket Ground
- Height: 194 cm (6 ft 4 in)
- Weight: 94 kg (207 lb)

Playing career^{1}
Years	Club	Games (Goals)
2007–2009	Hawthorn	2 (1)
- ^{1} Playing statistics correct to the end of 2009.

Mitchell Thorp (born 25 December 1988), better known as Mitch Thorp, is an Australian rules football player who played for the Hawthorn Football Club in the Australian Football League (AFL).

Thorp was a key position player, and was taken by Hawthorn at pick six in front of Joel Selwood 2006 National Draft.

Thorp debuted against Richmond in round 15 and after a large media buildup he played a promising game, including kicking a goal. An injury from that game meant he was unable to play the following week.

Called in as a late replacement, Thorp played his second game against Sydney in round 2, 2009.

Thorp had surgery to remove a bone fragment and have a pin inserted in his foot. Thorp would take at least three months to recover from a broken sesamoid bone in his left foot. The injury ruled Thorp out for the rest of the 2009 season.

Thorp was delisted by the Hawthorn Football club on 28 October 2009 after no club showed interest in him during the AFL trade week. He later entered the National Draft, but was unable to be drafted by a club.

== Post AFL ==
In 2010 Thorp played as a forward for Werribee Football Club in the Victorian Football League (VFL). In a match for Werribee against the Coburg Tigers, Thorp ran into, and knocked out, former Richmond defender Graham Polak.

In 2011, he returned to play football in Tasmania for the South Launceston Football Club. Thorp was appointed as playing coach of South Launceston for the 2012 season.

In 2013, Thorp guided South Launceston to the Tasmanian Football League premiership. In doing so, he became the youngest player to captain/coach a side in Tasmanian Football to a premiership. In the same season, Thorp won the Tassie Medal as the TSL's best player that year, starring in the state's win over the NEAFL and being the best forward in the competition.

Thorp entered the 2013 AFL draft, with a view of resuming his AFL career. Despite reported interest from Carlton, the Western Bulldogs, Fremantle, Gold Coast and Brisbane, Thorp was unsuccessful in getting drafted.

Thorp was appointed coach of the Western Storm Football Club in 2013. However, in December 2013, just two weeks after the official launch of the Storm, Thorp resigned from his position and left the Storm, accepting an offer to be a playing assistant coach for South Australian National Football League club Glenelg, in a bid to resurrect his AFL career.

At the end of the 2014 season, Thorp returned to the TSL to be playing coach of the Devonport Football Club.

Thorp joined Launceston ahead of the 2018 TSL season.

Thorp then became coach of the Launceston for the 2019 TSL Season. In 2020 he led them to a premiership.

== Statistics ==
Legend
G	Goals	K	Kicks	D	Disposals	T	Tackles
B	Behinds	H	Handballs	M	Marks

Season	Team	No.	Games	Totals							Averages (per game)							Votes
Season	Team	No.	Games	G	B	K	H	D	M	T	G	B	K	H	D	M	T	Votes
2007	Hawthorn	31	1	1	2	4	1	5	3	0	1.0	2.0	4.0	1.0	5.0	3.0	0.0	0
2008	Hawthorn	19	0	—	—	—	—	—	—	—	—	—	—	—	—	—	—	0
2009	Hawthorn	19	1	0	0	2	2	4	2	2	0.0	0.0	2.0	2.0	4.0	2.0	2.0	0
Career			2	1	2	6	3	9	5	2	0.5	1.0	3.0	1.5	4.5	2.5	1.0	0
