= Kingston Twin Ovals =

Sports facility in Tasmania

- Interactive map of Kingston Twin Ovals
- Location: 35 Twin Ovals Rd, Kingston TAS 7050
- Coordinates: 42.9753°S 147.2866°E
- Capacity: 7,000 (main oval)
- Surface: Grass

Construction
- Groundbreaking: 2009
- Opened: 2011

Tenants
- Tasmania Devils; Administration and training (2027-); VFL (2027-); VFLW (2027-); Kingborough FC (SFL/TSL/SFL Premier League) (2011–present); Kingborough District CC (TPC) (2011–present); Hobart Hurricanes (WBBL) (2016); Tasmanian Tigers (One-Day Cup) (2025)

Kingston Twin Ovals is an Australian rules football and cricket facility located in Kingston, a suburb 12 kilometers south of Hobart, Tasmania. The facility features two ovals capable of hosting football, cricket and other sports.

The main oval is the home ground of the Kingborough Tigers Football Club, who compete in the Southern Football League. The Tasmania Football Club will use the facility as their training and administrative headquarters from 2027, prior to entering the Australian Football League (AFL) as the competition's 19th club the following year.

== History ==
At the behest of local sports clubs, the Kingborough Council conducted a review of its existing community sporting facilities in 1999, and found that two new oval-shaped sportsgrounds should be developed at the site of Kingborough Sports Centre, which at the time featured a number of indoor sports facilities suitable for basketball, netball, volleyball, squash and other sports. In 2008 the council successfully applied for funding from the federal government's economic stimulus package to allow for construction of the two ovals, and site works commenced in mid-2009.

At the time of the council's application, local football side Kingborough was seeking to move to a ground that could meet the standards of the newly re-formed Tasmanian State League (TSL) competition. The Tigers were denied entry into the competition in 2009 as a result of their sub-standard existing facilities. The club moved into the newly opened Twin Ovals in 2011 and were granted entry into the competition in 2014. In 2018 broadcast towers and coaches boxes were modified to accommodate an AFL pre-season match between North Melbourne and Melbourne. Local cricket team Kingborough District Cricket Club have also played home games at the Twin Ovals since the venue was opened.

=== Tasmania Football Club ===
In May 2023, the AFL announced it had approved the awarding of a 19th license to Tasmania, and subsequently the Tasmania Football Club (nicknamed the Devils) was formed. The club will compete in the AFL competition from 2028. The club and state government assessed several options for a training and administrative headquarters to accommodate the team. In November 2024, the government announced the Kingston Twin Ovals had been selected over the Rosny Parklands on Hobart's eastern shore as the preferred site for the club's training facilities. The government, club and AFL will contribute $70 million to expand the site to 9,000 square meters and incorporate two more ovals, a gym, aquatic centre, recovery areas, and indoor training and administrative facilities, providing a permanent home for the club's AFL and AFL Women's (AFLW) teams. Construction is expected to conclude by October 2027.

After completion, the Devils will have exclusive use of the existing football oval and share the existing cricket oval (which will have its centre wicket removed) with the Tigers, who will use this oval as their match-day football oval. The two new ovals will have cricket wickets installed and be used by the local cricket club and for lower grade matches. Plans for the precinct were unveiled by the government in October 2025. The precinct received approval from the Kingborough Council in July 2026, with constricton commencing later in the month.
