= List of Tasmanian Football League leading goalkickers =

This is a list of Tasmanian Football League leading goalkickers under all names of the competition.

== TFA leading goalkicker: 1879–1886 ==
(Tasmanian Football Association (TFA) – formed 12 June 1879)

- 1879 – W. Cundy (Railway) – 7
- 1880 – W. Cundy (Railway) – 7
- 1881 – P. Butler (City) – 7
- 1882 – A. Stuart (Holebrook) – 6
- 1883 – E. Burgess (Cricketers) – 13
- 1884 – E. Burgess (Cricketers) – 10
- 1885 – Kenny Burn (Railway) – 14
- 1886 – J. Dunlop (City) – 7

== STFA leading goalkicker: 1887–1996 ==
(Southern Tasmanian Football Association (STFA) – formed 2 April 1887)

- 1887 – Kenny Burn (Railway) – 11
- 1888 – T. Barlow (Holebrook) – 6
- 1889 – C. Richards (Railway) – 9
- 1890 – T. Addison (Railway) – 9
- 1891 – S. Howe (Holebrook) – 9
- 1892 – S. Howe (Holebrook) – 9
- 1893 – J. Vimpany (Railway) – 12
- 1894 – G. Wright (Railway) – 12
- 1895 – C. Guest (City) – 21
- 1896 – G. Somers (North Hobart) – 13

== STFL leading goalkicker: 1897 ==
(Southern Tasmanian Football League (STFL) – formed 8 May 1897)

- 1897 – No records available

== STFA leading goalkicker: 1898–1905 ==
(Southern Tasmanian Football Association (STFA) – reformed 5 May 1898)

- 1898 – W. Abel (Lefroy) – 11
- 1899 – W. Facy (Lefroy) – 16
- 1900 – J. Ayres (Wellington) – 10
- 1901 – R. Hawson (Lefroy) – 18
- 1902 – W. Lee (Wellington) – 8
- 1903 – A. Walton (North Hobart) – 18
- 1904 – G. Somers (Wellington) – 11
- 1905 – T. Mills (North Hobart) – 15

== TFL leading goalkicker: 1906–1927 ==
(Tasmanian Football League (TFL) – formed 28 May 1906)

- 1906 – T. Mills (North Hobart) – 13
- 1907 – W. Lee (North Hobart) – 14
- 1908 – FiG. Cook (North Hobart) – 24
- 1909 – F. Burton (Cananore) – 11
- 1910 – C. Ward (Cananore) – 16
- 1911 – C. Ward (Cananore) – 24
- 1912 – A. Jones (Lefroy) – 17
- 1913 – G. Badernach (Cananore) – 13
- 1914 – S. Russell (North Hobart) – 26
- 1915 – A. Ringrose (Lefroy) – 18
- 1916 – TFL suspended due to World War I
- 1917 – TFL suspended due to World War I
- 1918 – TFL suspended due to World War I
- 1919 – TFL suspended due to influenza epidemic
- 1920 – [W. Jack (North Hobart) – 25
- 1921 – R. Manson (Lefroy) – 42
- 1922 – R. Manson (Lefroy) – 41
- 1923 – L. Stevens (North Hobart) – 26
- 1924 – J. Brain (Cananore) – 47
- 1925 – F. Ahearne (Cananore) – 50
- 1926 – J. Brain (Cananore) – 64
- 1927 – F. Ahearne (Cananore) – 45

== TANFL leading goalkicker: 1928–1985 ==
(Tasmanian Australian National Football League (TANFL) – formed 29 August 1927)

- 1928 – H. Smith (New Town) – 46
- 1929 – Alan Rait (North Hobart) – 92
- 1930 – Alan Rait (North Hobart) – 112
- 1931 – Alan Rait (North Hobart) – 85
- 1932 – Alan Rait (North Hobart) – 102
- 1933 – D. Kenna (New Town) – 55
- 1934 – Tom Heathorn (Lefroy) – 101
- 1935 – Alan Rait (North Hobart) – 84
- 1936 – Alan Rait (North Hobart) – 98
- 1937 – Alan Rait (North Hobart) – 62
- 1938 – T. Richardson (North Hobart) – 75
- 1939 – Jack Metherell (North Hobart) – 61
- 1940 – Jack Metherell (North Hobart) – 69
- 1941 – Jack Metherell (North Hobart) – 64
- 1942 – TANFL suspended due to World War II
- 1943 – TANFL suspended due to World War II
- 1944 – TANFL suspended due to World War II
- 1945 – E. Collis (North Hobart) – 54
- 1946 – Alf Cook (New Town) – 58
- 1947 – Lance Collins (Sandy Bay) – 50
- 1948 – Ian Westell (Sandy Bay) – 57
- 1949 – Albert Park (New Town) – 73
- 1950 – Ian Westell (Sandy Bay) – 83
- 1951 – J. Cooper (Clarence) – 42
- 1952 – Ian Westell (Sandy Bay) – 81
- 1953 – Bert Shaw (Sandy Bay) – 51
- 1954 – Ian Westell (Sandy Bay) – 68
- 1955 – Ian Westell (Sandy Bay) – 88
- 1956 – Noel Clarke (North Hobart) – 80
- 1957 – Ian Westell (Sandy Bay) – 67
- 1958 – Paddy Cooper (North Hobart) – 45
- 1959 – Mal Pascoe (Hobart) – 75
- 1960 – Mal Pascoe (Hobart) – 57
- 1961 – Noel Clarke (North Hobart) – 74
- 1962 – David Collins (North Hobart) – 77
- 1963 – Peter Hudson (New Norfolk) – 79
- 1964 – Peter Hudson (New Norfolk) – 86
- 1965 – Peter Hudson (New Norfolk) – 110
- 1966 – Peter Hudson (New Norfolk) – 103
- 1967 – David Collins (North Hobart) – 58
- 1968 – John Mills (Clarence) – 49
- 1969 – Brent Palfreyman (Sandy Bay) – 51
- 1970 – Brent Palfreyman (Sandy Bay) – 67
- 1971 – Terry Mayne (Clarence) – 74
- 1972 – Darryl Sutton (Glenorchy) – 73
- 1973 – Rod Adams (Sandy Bay) – 96
- 1974 – Frank Ogle (Glenorchy) – 55
- 1975 – Peter Hudson (Glenorchy) – 76
- 1976 – Peter Hudson (Glenorchy) – 133
- 1977 – Col Smith (Hobart) – 49
- 1978 – Peter Hudson (Glenorchy) – 153
- 1979 – Peter Hudson (Glenorchy) – 179
- 1980 – Paul Courto (Hobart) – 86
- 1981 – Andrew Vanderfeen (Clarence) – 66
- 1982 – Brett Stephens (North Hobart) – 92
- 1983 – Wayne Fox (New Norfolk) – 135
- 1984 – Wayne Fox (New Norfolk) – 93
- 1985 – Wayne Fox (New Norfolk) – 130

== TFL Statewide League leading goalkicker: 1986–2000 ==
(Tasmanian Football League Statewide League (TFL Statewide League) – formed January 1986)

- 1986 – Wayne Fox (Hobart) – 105
- 1987 – Paul Dac (New Norfolk) – 80, Wayne Fox (Hobart) – 80 and Steve McQueen (North Hobart) – 80
- 1988 – Chris Reynolds (Devonport) – 111
- 1989 – Shane Fell (Glenorchy) – 114
- 1990 – Paul Dac (New Norfolk) – 103
- 1991 – Paul Dac (New Norfolk) – 133
- 1992 – Byron Howard (North Hobart) – 92
- 1993 – Keith Robinson (Hobart) – 76
- 1994 – Paul Dac (Clarence) – 94
- 1995 – Byron Howard (North Hobart) – 104
- 1996 – Justin Plapp (Burnie Dockers) – 98
- 1997 – Byron Howard (North Hobart) – 70
- 1998 – Ken Rainsford (Devonport) – 94

== TSFL leading goalkicker: 1999 ==
(Tasmanian State Football League (TSFL) – formed February 1999)

- 1999 – Adam Aherne (Northern Bombers) – 68

== SWL leading goalkicker: 2000 ==
(State Wide League (SWL) – formed January 2000)

- 2000 – Scott Allen (Clarence) – 80

== TSL leading goalkicker: 2009–present ==
(Tasmanian State League (TSL) – formed 8 December 2008)

- 2009 – Brad Dutton (Clarence) – 75
- 2010 – Brian Finch (Launceston) – 94
- 2011 – Brian Finch (Launceston) – 105
- 2012 – Mitchell Williamson (Clarence) – 83
- 2013 – Sonny Whiting (Launceston) – 76
- 2014 – Aaron Cornelius (Glenorchy) – 67
- 2015 – Jaye Bowden (Glenorchy) – 57
- 2016 – Jaye Bowden (Glenorchy) – 75
- 2017 – Jaye Bowden (Glenorchy) – 52
- 2018 – Mitch Thorp (Launceston) - 62
- 2019 – Aiden Grace (Glenorchy) - 50
