= Kingborough Tigers Football Club =

Australian rules football club in Kingston, Tasmania

Kingborough Tigers

Names
- Full name: Kingborough Tigers Football Club
- Nickname: Tigers
- Club song: "We're from Tigerland!"

SFL Premier League 2025 season
- After finals: Men: N/A; Women: Premiers
- Home-and-away season: Men: 5th Women: 2nd
- Leading goalkicker: Men: Tyler Carter (45) Women: Georgie Bailey (44)
- Best and fairest: Men: Lachlan Gadomski Women: Molly Mitchell

Club details
- Founded: 1886; 140 years ago First season: 1895 (STFA); 1996 (SFL); 2014 (TSL); 2025 (SFL Premier League)
- Colours
- Competition: SFL Premier League
- President: Dan Wylie
- Coach: Men: Lachlan Clifford; Women: Dean King
- Captain(s): Men: Lachlan Gadomski; Women: Hailee Baldwin & Molly Mitchell
- Ground: Kingston Twin Ovals (capacity: 7,000)
- Former ground: Kingston Beach Oval

Uniforms
Home

Other information
- Official website: https://kingboroughtigers.com.au/

Kingborough Tigers Football Club is an Australian rules football club currently playing in the SFL Premier League In Tasmania, Australia.

== History ==
The club was founded in 1886 as Kingston Football Club and joined the Southern Tasmanian Football Association in 1893 as a junior club before playing its first senior match in the competition on 4 May 1895, against North Hobart at the then STFA Ground, located on the present site of the Cornelian Bay hockey fields. After leaving that competition at the completion of 1907, the club joined the Channel Football Association for one season in 1908 before joining the Kingborough Football Association, where it remained a member from 1909 to 1966. After the horrific bushfires of Southern Tasmania in 1967, the club absorbed the Longley Football Club and joined the Huon Football Association where it remained a member until it left the Association at the completion of the 1995 season to join the newly formed Southern Football League in 1996.

The Tigers tasted immediate success in their new environment, making a Grand Final in their first season, suffering a narrow defeat to Channel and taking out a shock win in the 1997 Grand Final over Claremont. After the SFL was split into two divisions from 2002–2008, the club was a member of the SFL Premier League where it competed amongst the Southern-based former clubs from the TFL.

In 2004 Kingston changed their name to Kingborough Tigers in order to broaden their appeal in the Kingborough region; their stint in the Premier League saw them moderately competitive, making the Elimination Final on a number of occasions but further success avoided them. After AFL Tasmania formed a new statewide competition to start in 2009, this one known as the Tasmanian State League, all teams from the SFL Premier League, with the exception of Kingborough and New Norfolk were invited to join.

Kingborough were knocked back by the sport's governing body due to their poor standard longtime home ground, Kingston Beach Oval (also known as "The Pit"). In 2011 the club moved into its brand new home at Huntingfield near Kingston, known as the Twin Ovals Complex which strengthened its case for future inclusion in the Tasmanian State League, the club had been earmarked as a possible merger candidate with the Hobart Football Club by AFL Tasmania which was met with considerable opposition from both clubs. On September 17, 2011, the Tigers broke through for their first premiership title in fourteen years with an upset victory over the previously undefeated New Norfolk in the SFL Grand Final by 49 points.

Ahead of the 2014 season, Kingborough were granted a licence to compete in the State League. Adam Henley coached the side in 2014. Kingborough competed simply as the Tigers or Tigers FC in the TSL from 2014–2021. A year after returning to their Kingborough name, the club won their first TSL premiership in 2023.

== Colours ==
The Kingston/Kingborough Football Club has worn a variety of differently playing colours throughout its history. In 1893 the club wore rose, primrose and black before changing to scarlet and dark blue the following year. In 1909 the club wore blue and white in its first season in the Kingborough Football Association before adopting a green and white uniform in 1910 which it was to wear until 1920 when it adopted red and black and then black and white before settling in 1946 on the current black and gold colours it wears today.

== Summary ==
- Home ground – Kingston Twin Ovals
- Established – 1886 as Kingston Football Club (renamed Kingborough in 2004)
- Playing colours – Black and gold (since 1946)
- Emblem – Tigers
- Club theme song – "We're from Tigerland" (Tune: "Row, Row, Row")
- Affiliations
  - STFA (1893–1907)
  - Channel FA (1908)
  - Kingborough FA (1909–1966)
  - Huon FA (1967–1995)
  - SFL (1996–2013)
  - TSL (2014–2024)
  - SFL Premier League (2025-present)

== Premiership Titles ==
Senior Men

- Kingborough Football Association (10): 1930, 1933, 1936, 1948, 1953, 1958, 1960, 1961, 1965, 1966
- Huon Football Association (3): 1980, 1991, 1995
- Southern Football League (2): 1997, 2011
- Tasmanian State League (1): 2023

Senior Women

- Southern Football League (1): 2025

== Tasmanian State League results ==
Season	Win–loss	Finishing position	Captain	Club Best & Fairest	Leading goalkicker
2014	0-18	10th	Tim Peterson	Tim Peterson	Luke Graham (17)
2015	4-14	9th	Tim Peterson	Mackenzie Willis	Christopher Nield (15)
2016	2-16	9th	Tim Peterson	Will Cleeland	Brandon Batchelor (29)
2017	4-14	7th	Tim Peterson	Mitchell Carter	Brandon Batchelor (23)
2018	3-15	6th	Sam Rice	Mitchell Carter	Luke Graham (29)
2019	6-12	5th	Sam Rice	Kieran Lovell	Tyler Carter & Michael Paul (27)
2020	4-8	5th	Sam Rice	Kieran Lovell	Tyler Carter (21)
2021			Lachlan Clifford		
2022		2nd	Lachlan Clifford		
2023		Premiers	Lachlan Clifford	Lachlan Clifford	Jack Tomkinson (37)
2024		4th	Lachlan Clifford	Kieran Lovell	Tyler Carter (41)

== Individual records ==
=== Individual medal winners ===
- Ivan Short Medal: Unknown
- Matthew Richardson Medal: Jordan Lane (2022)
- Darrel Baldock Medal: Kieran Lovell (2023)

=== Competition leading goalkickers ===
Senior Men

- Huon Football Association leading goalkickers: 1980 Bob Smith (118)
- SFL leading goalkickers
  - 2006 - Michael Darcy (96)
  - 2011 - Timothy Lamprill (105)

Senior Women

- SFL leading goalkickers
  - 2022 - Georgie Bailey (44)
  - 2023 - Stacey Fox (21)
  - 2025 - Georgie Bailey (45)
  - 2026 - Georgie Bailey (131)

== Club records ==
- Club record score: Unknown
- Club record games holder: Ray Lorkin (527)
- Club record match attendance:
  - 6,907 – Kingborough v New Norfolk at KGV Oval (2011 SFL Grand Final).
- Most goals by a player (match):
  - 19 - Georgie Bailey - v Brighton at Pontville Oval (23rd May 2026)
