= 2015 TSL season =

- Teams: 10
- Premiers: North Launceston; 4th premiership
- Minor premiers: Glenorchy
- Wooden spooners: Western Storm Football Club
- Alistair Lynch Medallist: Jaye Bowden
- Peter Hudson Medallist: Jaye Bowden
- Matches played: 90

The 2015 AFL Tasmania TSL premiership season was an Australian rules football competition staged across Tasmania, Australia over eighteen home and away rounds and six finals series matches between 3 April and 19 September.

North Launceston were the premiers for the 2015 season, after they defeated Glenorchy by 12 points in the Grand Final.

== Participating Clubs ==
- Burnie Dockers Football Club
- Clarence District Football Club
- Devonport Football Club
- Glenorchy District Football Club
- Hobart City Football Club
- Kingborough Tigers Football Club
- Lauderdale Football Club
- Launceston Football Club
- North Launceston Football Club
- Western Storm Football Club

== Awards ==
Source: See here

- Alastair Lynch Medal (Best afield throughout season): Jaye Bowden (Glenorchy)
- Eade Medal (Best and Fairest in Development League): Brendan Hay (Clarence)
- Hudson Medal (Highest goal kicker in TSL season): Jaye Bowden (Glenorchy) – 57 goals
- Baldock Medal (Grand Final Best on Ground): Josh Holland (North Launceston)
- Cazaly Medal (Premiership Coach in TSL): Zane Littlejohn (North Launceston)
- Matthew Richardson Medal (Rookie of the Year): Jordon Arnold (Glenorchy)
- RACT Insurance Player Of The Year: Taylor Whitford (North Launceston)

== 2015 TSL Club Coaches ==
- Clint Proctor (Burnie)
- Matthew Drury (Clarence)
- Mitch Thorp (Devonport)
- Aaron Cornelius (Glenorchy)
- Michael McGregor (Hobart City)
- Darren Winter (Lauderdale)
- Scott Stephens (Launceston)
- Zane Littlejohn (North Launceston)
- Mitch Hills (Western Storm)
- Adam Henley (Kingborough)

== 2015 Leading Goalkickers ==
- Jaye Bowden (Glenorchy) - 61
- Daniel Muir (Glenorchy) - 58
- Ben Halton (Lauderdale) - 55
- Julian Dobosz (Hobart City) - 51
- Chris McDonald (Burnie) - 48

=== Highest Individual Goalkickers (Match) ===
- 8 – Daniel Muir (Glenorchy) v Launceston – 2 May 2015 at KGV Oval
- 8 – Julian Dobosz (Hobart City) v Devonport – 25 April 2015 at Devonport Oval
- 8 – Sonny Whiting (Launceston) v Lauderdale – 23 May 2015 at Windsor Park
- 7 – Aaron McNab (Devonport) v North Launceston – 4 July 2015 at Devonport Oval

== Premiership season ==
Source: TSL Season 2015 results and fixtures

=== Round 1 ===
	Round 1
Friday, 3 April (2:00 pm)	Kingborough 11.13 (79)	def. by	Hobart City 15.10 (100)	Twin Ovals Complex
Friday, 3 April (2:30 pm)	North Launceston 16.7 (103)	def. by	Launceston 16.8 (104)	Windsor Park
Friday, 3 April (2:30 pm)	Western Storm 11.10 (76)	def. by	Lauderdale 12.15 (87)	Aurora Stadium
Friday, 3 April (5:00 pm)	Burnie 16.13 (109)	def.	Devonport 9.5 (59)	West Park
Saturday, 4 April (4:30 pm)	Glenorchy 17.17 (119)	def.	Clarence 8.4 (52)	KGV Oval

=== Round 2 (10 & 11 April) ===
- Launceston 12.14. (86) v Western Storm 12.11. (83) - Aurora Stadium
- Lauderdale 12.8. (80) v Clarence 9.7. (61) - Blundstone Arena
- Devonport 17.16. (118) v Kingborough 6.15. (51) - Devonport Oval
- Glenorchy 14.13. (97) v Hobart City 12.10. (82) - Queenborough Oval
- North Launceston 20.11. (131) v Burnie 12.10. (82) - Aurora Stadium

=== Round 3 (17 & 18 April) ===
- Clarence 9.19. (73) v Hobart City 7.9. (51) - Blundstone Arena
- Lauderdale 7.14. (56) v North Launceston 7.13. (55) - Lauderdale Oval
- Devonport 14.10. (94) v Launceston 8.10. (58) - Windsor Park
- Glenorchy 10.16. (76) v Kingborough 4.1. (25) - Twin Ovals Complex
- Burnie 18.9. (117) v Western Storm 13.10. (88) - West Park

=== Round 4 (25 & 26 April) ===
- Devonport 16.10. (106) v Hobart 13.5. (83) - Devonport Oval
- Glenorchy 15.9. (99) v Lauderdale 9.11. (65) - KGV Oval
- Kingborough 15.10. (100) v Clarence 13.5. (83) - Twin Ovals Complex *
- North Launceston 14.11. (95) v Western Storm 12.8. (80) - Aurora Stadium
- Burnie 18.11. (119) v Launceston 10.10. (70) - Windsor Park

Note: Kingborough's first win in the TSL.

=== Round 5 (2 May) ===
- Burnie 11.20. (86) v Clarence 4.7. (31) - West Park
- Glenorchy 23.15. (153) v Launceston 6.3. (39) - KGV Oval
- Hobart City 12.12. (84) v Western Storm 8.16. (64) - North Hobart Oval
- Lauderdale 19.7. (121) v Kingborough 4.11. (35) - Lauderdale Oval
- North Launceston 14.21. (105) v Devonport 9.9. (63) - Aurora Stadium

=== Round 6 (15 & 16 May) ===
- North Launceston 24.16. (160) v Launceston 6.5. (41) - Aurora Stadium
- Glenorchy 17.14. (116) v Clarence 8.11. (59) - Blundstone Arena
- Lauderdale 17.10. (112) v Hobart City 8.16. (64) - Lauderdale Oval
- Burnie 18.17. (125) v Kingborough 7.8. (50) - Twin Ovals Complex
- Devonport 11.14. (80) v Western Storm 11.8. (74) - Devonport Oval

=== Round 7 (22 & 23 May) ===
- Hobart City 12.12. (84) v Kingborough 11.13. (79) - North Hobart Oval
- Glenorchy 19.5. (119) v Devonport 5.6. (36) - KGV Oval
- Launceston 15.11. (101) v Lauderdale 15.9. (99) - Windsor Park
- Clarence 10.14. (74) v Western Storm 7.18. (60) - Aurora Stadium
- Burnie 12.9. (81) v North Launceston 8.4. (52) - West Park

=== Round 8 (30 & 31 May) ===
- Burnie 6.16. (52) v Devonport 5.10. (40) - Devonport Oval
- Hobart City 11.5. (71) v North Launceston 10.10 (70) - North Hobart Oval
- Glenorchy 17.13. (115) v Kingborough 5.5. (35) - Twin Ovals Complex
- Clarence 15.15. (105) v Lauderdale 11.12. (78) - Lauderdale Oval
- Launceston 10.7. (67) v Western Storm 9.11. (65) - Windsor Park

=== Round 9 (13 June) ===
- Clarence 17.14. (116) v Kingborough 8.7. (55) - Blundstone Arena
- Glenorchy 16.14. (110) v Hobart City 3.7. (25) - KGV Oval
- Lauderdale 11.15. (81) v Devonport 10.16. (76) - lauderdale Oval
- North Launceston 16.15. (111) v Western Storm 11.4. (70) - Aurora Stadium
- Launceston 15.11. (101) v Burnie 11.14. (80) - West Park

=== Round 10 (20 & 21 June) ===
- Hobart City 18.11. (119) v Clarence 10.11. (71) - North Hobart Oval
- Lauderdale 14.9. (93) v Glenorchy 9.7. (61) - Lauderdale Oval
- North Launceston 18.11. (119) v Kingborough 8.10. (58) - Aurora Stadium
- Devonport 13.21. (99) v Launceston 6.14. (50) - Devonport Oval
- Burnie 24.13. (157) v Western Storm 7.7. (49) - Aurora Stadium

=== Round 11 (27 June) ===
- Burnie 13.15. (93) v Hobart City 4.11. (35) - West Park
- Western Storm 12.19. (91) v Devonport 8.4. (52) - Aurora Stadium
- North Launceston 16.9. (105) v Clarence 10.13. (73) - Blundstone Arena
- Glenorchy 13.17. (95) v Launceston 7.6. (48) - Windsor Park
- Kingborough 11.12. (78) v Lauderdale 9.16. (70) - Twin Ovals Complex

=== Round 12 (4 & 5 July) ===
- Devonport 16.10. (106) v North Launceston 9.8. (62) - Devonport Oval
- Hobart City 14.14. (98) v Western Storm 10.6. (66) - North Hobart Oval
- Burnie 14.11. (95) v Lauderdale 8.10. (58) - Lauderdale Oval
- Kingborough 11.13. (79) v Launceston 11.7. (73) - Twin Ovals Complex
- Glenorchy 15.12. (102) v Clarence 7.7. (49) - KGV Oval

=== Round 13A (11 July) ===
- Burnie 16.21. (117) v Kingborough 4.9. (33) - West Park
- Clarence 20.10. (130) v Devonport 16.7. (103) - Blundstone Arena

=== Round 13B (17 & 18 July) ===
- North Launceston 15.7. (97) v Launceston 8.5. (53) - Aurora Stadium
- Hobart City 13.9. (87) v Lauderdale 12.8. (80) - North Hobart Oval
- Glenorchy 15.12. (102) v Western Storm 10.9. (69) - Aurora Stadium

=== Round 14 (25 & 26 July) ===
- Glenorchy 18.15. (123) v Kingborough 7.6. (48) - KGV Oval
- Lauderdale 14.15. (99) v Clarence 13.3. (81) - Blundstone Arena
- Hobart City 19.8. (122) v Launceston 7.4. (46) - Windsor Park
- North Launceston 17.3. (105) v Western Storm 5.4. (34) - Aurora Stadium
- Burnie 10.13. (73) v Devonport 3.4. (22) - Devonport Oval

=== Round 15 (1 August) ===
- Clarence 10.11. (71) v Hobart City 8.11. (59) - North Hobart Oval
- Glenorchy 11.14. (80) v Lauderdale 2.9. (21) - Lauderdale Oval
- Devonport 12.8. (80) v Launceston 9.7. (61) - Windsor Park
- Kingborough 9.15. (69) v Western Storm 7.5. (47) - Twin Ovals Complex
- North Launceston 8.13. (61) v Burnie 8.12. (60) - West Park

=== Round 16 (8 & 9 August) ===
- Launceston 11.5. (71) v Clarence 8.6. (54) - Blundstone Arena
- Devonport 15.13. (103) v Lauderdale 10.9. (69) - Devonport Oval
- North Launceston 8.14. (62) v Glenorchy 9.6. (60) - Aurora Stadium
- Hobart City 13.12. (90) v Kingborough 1.10. (16) - Twin Ovals Complex
- Burnie 10.10. (70) v Western Storm 7.4. (46) - Aurora Stadium

=== Round 17 (14–16 August) ===
- Glenorchy 17.17. (119) v Hobart City 1.10. (16) - KGV Oval
- North Launceston 17.14. (116) v Clarence 13.6. (84) - Aurora Stadium
- Burnie 15.14. (104) v Launceston 7.8. (50) - West Park
- Devonport 19.16. (130) v Western Storm 8.11. (59) - Aurora Stadium
- Lauderdale 20.18. (138) v Kingborough 8.7. (55) - Lauderdale Oval

=== Round 18 (21 & 22 August) ===
- Lauderdale 15.7. (97) v Hobart City 6.8. (44) - North Hobart Oval
- Glenorchy 19.13. (127) v Burnie 8.5. (53) - KGV Oval
- Clarence 16.13. (109) v Kingborough 11.10. (76) - Blundstone Arena
- Devonport 12.7. (79) v North Launceston 11.11. (77) - Devonport Oval
- Western Storm 16.14. (110) v Launceston 11.2. (68) - Windsor Park *

Note: Western Storm's final game in the TSL.

== Ladder ==
2015 TSL Ladder
Pos	Team	Pld	W	L	D	PF	PA	PP	Pts
1	Glenorchy (MP)	18	16	2	0	1873	877	213.6	64
2	Burnie	18	14	4	0	1673	1103	151.7	56
3	North Launceston (P)	18	13	5	0	1687	1254	134.5	52
4	Lauderdale	18	10	8	0	1504	1356	110.9	40
5	Devonport	18	10	8	0	1446	1404	103.0	40
6	Hobart City	18	9	9	0	1314	1449	90.7	36
7	Clarence	18	7	11	0	1376	1595	86.3	28
8	Launceston	18	5	13	0	1186	1797	66.0	20
9	Tigers FC	18	4	14	0	1021	1824	56.0	16
10	Western Storm	18	2	16	0	1231	1652	74.5	8

Rules for classification: 1) points; 2) percentage; 3) number of points for.
(P) Premiers; (MP) Minor Premiers

== Season Records ==
=== Highest Club Scores ===
- 24.16. (160) – North Launceston v Launceston 15 May 2015 at Aurora Stadium
- 24.13. (157) – Burnie v Western Storm 21 June 2015 at Aurora Stadium
- 23.15. (153) – Glenorchy v Launceston 2 May 2015 at KGV Oval

=== Lowest Club Scores ===
- 1.10. (16) – Hobart City v Glenorchy 17.17. (119) – 14 August 2015 at KGV Oval
- 1.10. (16) – Kingborough v Hobart City 13.12. (90) – 8 August 2015 at Twin Ovals Complex
- 2.9. (21) – Lauderdale v Glenorchy 11.14. (80) – 1 August 2015 at Lauderdale Oval

== TSL Team Of The Year ==
2015 TSL Team of The Year
B:	Jordan Arnold (Glenorchy)	Tom Cleary (Glenorchy)	Corey Nankervis (North Launceston)
HB:	Harry Walters (Burnie)	Ben Reynolds (Glenorchy)	Claye Hardy (Burnie)
C:	Jake Cox (Clarence)	Brayden Webb (Glenorchy) (Captain)	Mackenzie Willis (Kingborough)
HF:	Dylan Smith (Burnie)	Michael Cassidy (Lauderdale)	Jaye Bowden (Glenorchy)
F:	Chris McDonald (Burnie)	Julian Dobosz (Hobart City)	Aaron McNab (Devonport)
Foll:	Jason Laycock (Burnie)	Ethan Petterwood (North Launceston)	Taylor Whitford (North Launceston)
Int:	Daniel Roozendaal (North Launceston)	Bryce Walsh (Lauderdale)	Tom Bennett (North Launceston)
Int:	Jobi Harper (Western Storm)		
Coach:	Aaron Cornelius (Glenorchy)		

== TSL Finals Series ==
=== Qualifying Final ===
(Saturday, 29 August 2015)

- Burnie: 5.5. (35) | 9.8. (62) | 12.10. (82) | 15.14. (104)
- North Launceston: 0.1. (1) | 3.2. (20) | 9.3. (57) | 13.10. (88)

at West Park

=== Elimination Final ===
(Saturday, 29 August 2015)

- Lauderdale: 3.2. (20) | 5.4. (34) | 9.6. (60)| 13.8. (86)
- Devonport: 0.0. (0) | 1.3. (9) | 5.7. (37)| 7.8. (50)

at Blundstone Arena

=== 1st Semi Final ===
(Saturday, 5 September 2015)

- North Launceston: 3.3. (21) | 6.10. (46) | 8.13. (61) | 9.19. (73)
- Lauderdale: 1.3. (9) | 3.6. (24) | 6.7. (43) | 10.10. (70)

at Aurora Stadium

=== 2nd Semi Final ===
(Saturday, 5 September 2015)

- Glenorchy: 5.2. (32) | 7.4. (46) | 11.9. (75) | 13.16. (94)
- Burnie: 3.0. (18) | 6.2. (38) | 7.2. (44) | 8.4. (52)

at Blundstone Arena

=== Preliminary Final ===
(Saturday, 12 September 2015)

- North Launceston: 2.2. (14) | 5.6. (36) | 9.12. (66) | 13.18. (96)
- Burnie: 4.2. (26) | 5.3 (33) | 8.3. (51) | 12.3. (75)

at Aurora Stadium

=== Grand Final ===
2015 TSL Grand Final
Saturday 19 September (2:30 pm)	Glenorchy	def. by	North Launceston	Blundstone Arena (crowd: 5,978)
2.1 (13); 5.1 (31); 8.11 (59); 11.13 (79)	Q1; Q2; Q3; Final	5.2 (32); 7.7 (49); 9.9 (63); 13.13 (91)	Darrel Baldock Medal: Josh Holland (North Launceston)
J. Bowden 4, S. Piuselli 2, Mitchell Rainbird 2, D. Muir 2, L.Smith 1	Goals	B. Cox-Goodyer 4, A. O'Sign 3, J. Holland 3, Z. Burt 1, W. McBride 1, J.Pearce 1
J. Bowden, M. Dilger, S. Hall, C. Brown, D. Muir, B. Webb	Best	J. Holland, C. Nankervis, B. Cox-Goodyer, G. Mohr, E. Petterwood, A. Lee

== State Game ==
2015 State Game
Sunday 7 June	NEAFL	def.	TSL	Moreton Bay Sports Complex
3.1 (19); 6.3 (39); 7.6 (48); 11.11 (77)	Q1; Q2; Q3; Final	4.3 (27); 6.6 (42); 7.8 (50); 8.9 (57)
J. Bennett 3, S. Michael 2, B. Grewar 2, E. Sansbury 1, M. Uebergang 1, J. Williams 1, J. Derickx 1,	Goals	B. Halton 2, J. Blackberry 1, J. Dobosz 1, J. Laycock 1, B. Webb 1, S. Whiting 1, M. Willis 1
T. Barton, G. Grose, J. Hunt, J. Wagner, T. Young, M. Rawlinson	Best	B. Webb, J. Harper, J. Cox, M. Willis, B. Walsh, E. Petterwood
