= 2016 TSL season =

- Teams: 9
- Premiers: Glenorchy; 3rd premiership
- Minor premiers: Glenorchy
- Wooden spooners: Kingborough Football Club
- Alistair Lynch Medallist: Jaye Bowden (Glenorchy)
- Peter Hudson Medallist: Jaye Bowden (Glenorchy)
- Matches played: 82

The 2016 AFL Tasmania TSL premiership season was an Australian rules football competition staged across Tasmania, Australia over twenty-one home and away rounds and six finals series matches between 24 March and 17 September.

The League was known as the Southern Cross State League under a commercial naming-rights sponsorship agreement with the company.

Prospect Hawks would replace the Western Storm at the end of the 2015 season. However they would only field a Development League side in 2016 and dropped out of the Development League at the end of the 2016 season.

Glenorchy were the premiers for the 2016 season, after they defeated North Launceston by 20 points in the Grand Final.

== Participating clubs ==
- Burnie Dockers Football Club
- Clarence District Football Club
- Devonport Football Club
- Glenorchy District Football Club
- Hobart City Football Club
- Kingborough Tigers Football Club
- Lauderdale Football Club
- Launceston Football Club
- North Launceston Football Club
- - Prospect Hawks Football Club - (Development League only)

== Awards ==
- Alastair Lynch Medal (Best afield throughout season): Jaye Bowden (Glenorchy)
- Eade Medal (Best and Fairest in Development League): Paul Hudson (Lauderdale)
- Hudson Medal (Highest goal kicker in TSL season): Jaye Bowden (Glenorchy) – 80 goals
- Baldock Medal (Grand Final Best on Ground): Clinton French (Glenorchy)
- Cazaly Medal (Premiership Coach in TSL): Aaron Cornelius (Glenorchy)
- Matthew Richardson Medal (Rookie of the Year): Toutai Havea (Lauderdale)
- RACT Insurance Player Of The Year: Jaye Bowden (Glenorchy)
- Development League Grand Final Best On Ground: Jarrod Harper (Clarence)

== 2016 TSL coaches ==
- Clint Proctor (Burnie)
- Trent Bartlett & Jeromey Webberley (Clarence)
- Mitch Thorp (Devonport)
- Aaron Cornelius (Glenorchy)
- Kane Richter (Hobart City)
- Darren Winter (Lauderdale)
- Chris Hills (Launceston)
- Zane Littlejohn (North Launceston)
- Adam Henley (Kingborough)

== 2016 TSL leading goalkickers ==
- Jaye Bowden (Glenorchy) - 80
- Mitch Thorp (Devonport) - 55

=== Highest individual goalkicker (match) ===
- 12 – Jaye Bowden (Glenorchy) v Hobart City – 9 July 2016 at North Hobart Oval

== Premiership season ==
Source: TSL Season 2016 results and fixtures

=== Round 1 ===
(Thursday 24 March & Saturday 26 March)

- – Hobart City 7.6 (48) v Kingborough 15.12 (102) – North Hobart Oval (Thursday)
- – North Launceston 9.9 (63) v Launceston 5.9 (39) – York Park (Thursday Night)
- – Lauderdale 12.12 (84) v Glenorchy 6.16 (52) – Lauderdale Oval (Saturday)
- – Devonport 9.10 (64) v Burnie 11.9 (75) – Devonport Oval (Saturday)
- Bye: Clarence

=== Round 2 ===
(Saturday 2 April)

- – Burnie 15.18 (108) v Kingborough 7.10 (52) – West Park Oval
- – Launceston 9.16 (70) v Hobart City 9.8 (62) – Windsor Park
- – Glenorchy 13.9 (87) v Clarence 5.8 (38) – KGV Oval
- – North Launceston 11.17. (83) v Devonport 9.9 (63) – York Park (Saturday Night)
- Bye: Lauderdale

=== Round 3 ===
(Saturday 9 April)

- – Devonport 10.10 (70) v Lauderdale 10.6 (66) – Devonport Oval
- – Hobart City 5.10 (40) v Burnie 17.16 (118) – North Hobart Oval
- – Glenorchy 17.12 (114) v Launceston 4.3 (27) – KGV Oval
- – Kingborough 18.12 (120) V Clarence 14.9 (93) – Twin Ovals Complex (Saturday Night)
- Bye: North Launceston

=== Round 4 ===
(Saturday 16 April & Sunday 17 April)

- – Burnie 11.13 (79) v Glenorchy 7.11 (53) – West Park Oval
- – Clarence 10.10 (70) v Hobart City 12.9 (81) – Bellerive Oval
- – Lauderdale 14.14 (98) v North Launceston 5.13 (43) – Lauderdale Oval
- – Launceston 13.7 (85) v Devonport 15.9 (99) Windsor Park (Sunday)
- Bye: Kingborough

=== Round 5 ===
(Saturday 23 April & Monday 25 April)

- – Clarence 18.7 (115) v Devonport 10.10 (70) – Bellerive Oval
- – Burnie 8.14 (62) v North Launceston 14.13 (97) – West Park Oval
- – Launceston 8.6. (54) v Lauderdale 13.15 (93) – Windsor Park (Monday)
- – Kingborough 6.8 (44) v Glenorchy 21.12 (138) – Twin Ovals Complex (Monday)
- Bye: Hobart City

=== Round 6 ===
(Saturday 30 April)

- – Devonport 20.13 (133) v Kingborough 9.2 (56) – Devonport Oval
- – Lauderdale 9.10 (64) v Burnie 18.16 (124) – Lauderdale Oval
- – North Launceston 14.18 (102) v Clarence 9.10 (64) – York Park
- – Glenorchy 17.9 (111) v Hobart City 6.5 (41) – KGV Oval (Saturday Night)
- Bye: Launceston

=== Round 7 ===
(Saturday 7 May)

- – Hobart City 11.7 (73) v Devonport 15.17 (107) – North Hobart Oval
- – Kingborough 5.7 (37) v North Launceston 20.18 (138) – Twin Ovals Complex
- – Clarence 23.13 (151) v Lauderdale 15.7 (97) – Bellerive Oval
- – Burnie 17.13 (115) v Launceston 15.6 (96) – West Park Oval
- Bye: Glenorchy

=== Round 8 ===
(Friday 13 May & Saturday 14 May)

- – Hobart City 12.10 (82) v Lauderdale 13.6 (84) – North Hobart Oval (Friday Night)
- – Kingborough 8.15 (63) v Launceston 24.5 (149) – Twin Ovals Complex
- – Clarence 12.17 (89) v Burnie 18.13 (121) – Bellerive Oval
- – Glenorchy 8.13 (61) v North Launceston 5.7 (37) – KGV Oval (Saturday Night)
- Bye: Devonport

=== Round 9 ===
(Saturday 21 May)

- – Launceston 17.14 (116) v Clarence 9.14 (68) – Windsor Park
- – Lauderdale 19.21 (135) v Kingborough 5.11 (41) – Lauderdale Oval
- – North Launceston 11.12 (78) v Hobart City 11.6 (72) – York Park
- – Devonport 8.10 (58) v Glenorchy 17.8 (110) – Devonport Oval
- Bye: Burnie

=== Round 10 ===
(Friday 27 May & Saturday 28 May)

- – Clarence 6.8 (44) v Glenorchy 21.21 (147) – Bellerive Oval (Friday Night)
- – Burnie 11.17 (83) v Devonport 8.13 (61) – West Park Oval (Friday Night)
- – Launceston 6.8 (44) v North Launceston 14.11 (95) – Windsor Park (Saturday)
- – Kingborough 8.10 (58) v Hobart City 12.11 (83) – Twin Ovals Complex (Saturday)
- Bye: Lauderdale

=== Round 11 ===
(Saturday 4 June)

- – Glenorchy 21.15 (141) v Burnie 3.9 (27) – KGV Oval
- – Hobart City 11.10 (76) v Clarence 16.15 (111) – North Hobart Oval
- – North Launceston 16.7 (103) v Lauderdale 9.5 (59) – York Park
- – Devonport 20.14 (134) v Launceston 6.5 (41) – Devonport Oval
- Bye: Kingborough

=== Round 12 ===
(Saturday 18 June)

- – Kingborough 13.7 (85) v Burnie 16.9 (105) – Twin Ovals Complex
- – Glenorchy 18.8 (116) v Lauderdale 11.8 (74) – KGV Oval
- – Hobart City 19.10 (124) v Launceston 16.12 (108) – North Hobart Oval
- – Devonport 12.5 (77) v North Launceston 17.15 (117) – Devonport Oval
- Bye: Clarence

=== Round 13 ===
(Saturday 25 June)

- – Burnie 17.21 (123) v Hobart City 10.11 (71) – West Park Oval
- – Lauderdale 12.11 (83) v Devonport 12.10 (82) – Lauderdale Oval
- – Launceston 6.8 (44) v Glenorchy 26.14 (170) – Windsor Park
- – Clarence 19.13 (127) v Kingborough 10.12 (72) – Bellerive Oval
- Bye: North Launceston

=== Round 14 ===
(Saturday 2 July & Sunday 3 July)

- – Devonport 12.10 (82) v Clarence 12.8 (80) – Devonport Oval
- – North Launceston 16.11 (107) v Burnie 10.11 (71) – York Park
- – Lauderdale 13.21 (99) v Launceston 10.9 (69) – Lauderdale Oval
- – Glenorchy 29.14 (188) v Kingborough 2.4 (16) – KGV Oval (Sunday)
- Bye: Hobart City

=== Round 15 ===
(Saturday 9 July)

- – Burnie 12.10 (82) v Lauderdale 8.9 (57) – West Park Oval
- – Kingborough 10.12. (72) v Devonport 22.13 (145) – Twin Ovals Complex
- – Clarence 11.14 (80) v North Launceston 21.10 (136) – Bellerive Oval
- – Hobart City 6.8 (44) v Glenorchy 27.9 (171) – North Hobart Oval
- Bye: Launceston

=== Round 16 ===
(Saturday 16 July)

- – Devonport 8.12 (60) v Hobart City 15.6 (96) – Devonport Oval
- – North Launceston 30.19 (199) v Kingborough 3.6 (24) – York Park
- – Lauderdale 16.16 (112) v Clarence 10.9 (69) – Lauderdale Oval
- – Launceston 10.10 (70) v Burnie 20.8 (128) – Windsor Park
- Bye: Glenorchy

=== Round 17 ===
(Saturday 23 July)

- – Burnie 14.22 (106) v Clarence 4.2 (26) – West Park Oval
- – North Launceston 9.8 (62) v Glenorchy 10.6 (66) – York Park
- – Lauderdale 4.15 (39) v Hobart City 5.9 (39) – Lauderdale Oval *
- – Launceston 14.10 (94) v Kingborough 14.8 (92) – Windsor Park
- Bye: Devonport

Note: The second draw in TSL History, with both involving Lauderdale.

=== Round 18 ===
(Saturday 30 July & Sunday 31 July)

- – Glenorchy 12.10 (82) v Devonport 6.9 (45) – KGV Oval
- – Clarence 24.10 (154) v Launceston 11.9 (75) – Bellerive Oval
- – Hobart City 11.11 (77) v North Launceston 11.12 (78) – North Hobart Oval
- – Kingborough 9.13 (67) v Lauderdale 11.19 (85) – Twin Ovals Complex (Sunday)
- Bye: Burnie

=== Round 19 ===
(Friday 5 August & Saturday 6 August)

- – Burnie 12.11 (83) v Devonport 10.14 (74) – West Park Oval (Friday Night)
- – Launceston 4.7 (31) v North Launceston 18.10 (118) – Windsor Park (Saturday)
- – Clarence 8.8 (56) v Glenorchy 27.13 (175) – Bellerive Oval (Saturday)
- Bye: Hobart City, Kingborough, Lauderdale

=== Round 20 ===
(Saturday 13 August)

- – Kingborough 9.8 (62) v Hobart City 15.15 (105) – Twin Ovals Complex
- – Lauderdale 14.12 (96) v Clarence 12.17 (89) – Lauderdale Oval
- – North Launceston 5.8 (38) v Burnie 14.14 (98) – York Park
- – Devonport 12.8 (80) v Launceston 6.8 (44) – Devonport Oval

Bye: Glenorchy

=== Round 21 ===
(Friday 19 August)

- – Hobart City 21.9 (135) v Lauderdale 9.14 (68) – North Hobart Oval (Friday Night)
- – Glenorchy 21.22 (148) v Kingborough 4.5 (29) – KGV Oval (Friday Night)

Bye: Burnie, Clarence, Devonport, Launceston, North Launceston

== Ladder ==
2016 TSL Ladder
Pos	Team	Pld	W	L	D	PF	PA	PP	Pts
1	Glenorchy (MP) (P)	18	16	2	0	2130	849	250.9	64
2	Burnie	18	15	3	0	1708	1285	132.9	60
3	North Launceston	18	14	4	0	1694	1123	150.8	56
4	Lauderdale	18	10	7	1	1493	1468	101.7	42
5	Devonport	18	8	10	0	1504	1434	104.9	32
6	Hobart City	18	6	11	1	1349	1618	83.4	26
7	Clarence	18	5	13	0	1524	1871	81.5	20
8	Launceston	18	4	14	0	1256	1871	67.1	16
9	Kingborough	18	2	16	0	1092	2221	49.2	8

Rules for classification: 1) points; 2) percentage; 3) number of points for.
(P) Premiers; (MP) Minor Premiers

== Season records ==
=== Highest club scores ===
- 30.19. (199) – North Launceston v Kingborough 16 July 2016 at Aurora Stadium
- 29.14. (188) – Glenorchy v Kingborough 3 July 2016 at KGV Oval
- 23.15. (153) – Glenorchy v Clarence 6 August 2016 at Bellerive Oval

=== Lowest club scores ===
- 2.4. (16) – Kingborough v Glenorchy 29.14. (188) – 3 July 2016 at KGV Oval
- 3.6. (24) – Kingborough v North Launceston 30.19. (199) – 16 July 2016 at York Park
- 4.2. (26) – Clarence v Burnie 14.22. (106) – 23 July 2016 at West Park Oval

== TSL Team Of The Year ==
2016 TSL Team of The Year
B:	Jordan Arnold (Glenorchy)	Tom Cleary (Glenorchy)	Corey Nankervis (North Launceston)
HB:	Jay Lockhart (North Launceston)	Ben Reynolds (Glenorchy) (Captain)	Harry Walters (Burnie)
C:	Jake Cox (Clarence)	Taylor Whitford (North Launceston) (Vice-Captain)	Daniel Joseph (Glenorchy)
HF:	Bradley Cox-Goodyer (North Launceston)	Mitch Thorp (Devonport)	Ian Callinan (Clarence)
F:	Trent Standen (Clarence)	Jaye Bowden (Glenorchy)	Nick Dodge (Lauderdale)
Foll:	Tyrone Morrison (Burnie)	Jobi Harper (Burnie)	Clint Riley (Burnie)
Int:	Daniel Roozendaal (North Launceston)	Dylan Riley (Devonport)	Rhys Mott (Glenorchy)
Int:	Jack Siggins (Lauderdale)		
Coach:	Aaron Cornelius (Glenorchy)		

== TSL Finals Series ==
=== Qualifying Final ===
(Saturday 27 August)

- North Launceston: 1.2. (8) | 4.4. (28) | 5.6. (36) | 7.11. (53)
- Burnie: 4.5. (29) | 5.5. (35) | 5.6. (36) | 5.7. (37)

at West Park

=== Elimination Final ===
(Saturday 27 August)

- Lauderdale: – 3.7. (25) | 5.12. (42) | 10.20. (80) | 14.23. (107)
- Devonport: – 3.0. (18) | 5.1. (31) | 5.1 (31) | 7.4. (46)

at Bellerive Oval

=== 1st Semi-Final ===
(Saturday 3 September)

- Burnie: 6.5. (41) | 10.7. (67) | 12.11. (83) | 14.15. (99)
- Lauderdale: 2.1. (13) | 5.6. (36) | 9.13. (67) | 10.16. (76)

at York Park

=== 2nd Semi-Final ===
(Saturday 3 September)

- North Launceston: 1.2. (8) | 9.3. (57) | 11.5. (71) | 17.5. (107)
- Glenorchy: 2.2. (14) | 4.4. (28) | 11.7. (73) | 15.9. (99)

at Bellerive Oval

=== Preliminary Final ===
- Glenorchy: 6.6. (42) | 11.8. (74) | 16.12. (108) | 22.17. (149)
- Burnie: 2.1. (13) | 5.2. (32) | 6.3. (39) | 8.7. (55)

at Bellerive Oval

=== Grand Final ===
2016 TSL Grand Final
Saturday 17 September (2:30 pm)	North Launceston	def. by	Glenorchy	Aurora Stadium (crowd: 6,128)
2.2 (14); 3.6 (24); 4.7 (31); 5.10 (40)	Q1; Q2; Q3; Final	3.0 (18); 3.0 (18); 8.3 (51); 9.6 (60)	Darrel Baldock Medal: Clinton French (Glenorchy)
S. Witkowski 1, M. Walsh 1, T. Thomas 1, Z. Burt 1, J. Ponting 1	Goals	C. French 4, Mitchell Rainbird 1, J. Bowden 1, T. Bowden 1, J. Hayden 1, D. Muir 1
T. Whitford, T. Thomas, J. Foon, C. Nankervis, M. Walsh	Best	C. French, B. Reynolds, T. Cleary, J. Bowden, M. Hills, L. Smith

== State Game ==
2016 State Game
Sunday 7 June	WAFL	def.	TSL	Steel Blue Oval
4.3 (27); 10.10 (70); 17.11 (113); 25.14 (164)	Q1; Q2; Q3; Final	1.1 (7); 1.4 (10); 4.4 (28); 4.6 (30)
B. Peake 7, B. Saunders 6, D. Cameron 3, J. Bolton 2, P. Johnson 2, T. Notte 1, R. Cook 1, A. Hams 1, T. Kelly 1, R. Neates 1	Goals	I. Callinan 2, T. Whitford 1, T. Standen 1
J. Bolton, S. Nelson, P. Johnson, L. Meadows, B. Peake, A. Hams	Best	J. Cox, J. Harper, I. Callinan, T. Whitford, R. Mott
