= 2014 TSL season =

- Teams: Burnie Dockers; Clarence Kangaroos; Devonport Magpies; Glenorchy Magpies; Hobart City; Kingborough Tigers; Lauderdale Bombers; Launceston Blues; North Launceston Bombers; Western Storm
- Premiers: North Launceston
- Runners-up: Western Storm
- Minor premiers: Clarence
- Best and fairest: Daniel Roozendaal (North Launceston)

The 2014 AFL Tasmania TSL premiership season was an Australian rules football competition staged across Tasmania, Australia over eighteen home and away rounds and six finals series matches between 5 April and 21 September.

The League was known as the RACT Insurance Tasmanian State League under a commercial naming-rights sponsorship agreement with the motoring insurance company.

Three clubs exited the competition ahead of the 2014 season - reigning premiers South Launceston, as well as North Hobart and Hobart. They were replaced by new entity Western Storm, elevated team Kingborough Tigers and the newly formed Hobart City.

North Launceston were the premiers for the 2014 season, after they defeated the Western Storm by 59 points in the Grand Final.

== Participating clubs ==
- Burnie Dockers Football Club
- Clarence District Football Club
- Devonport Football Club
- Glenorchy District Football Club
- Hobart City Football Club
- Kingborough Tigers Football Club
- Lauderdale Football Club
- Launceston Football Club
- North Launceston Football Club
- Western Storm Football Club

== Awards ==
Source: See here

- Alastair Lynch Medal (Best afield throughout season): Daniel Roozendaal
- Eade Medal (Best and Fairest in Development League): Mitchell Swan
- Hudson Medal (Highest goal kicker in TSL season): Aaron Cornelius – 76 goals
- Baldock Medal (Grand Final Best on Ground): Daniel Roozendaal
- Cazaly Medal (Premiership Coach in TSL): Zane Littlejohn
- Matthew Richardson Medal (Rookie of the Year): Ben Halton

== 2014 TSL Club Coaches ==
- Andrew Herring and Luke Shackleton (Burnie)
- Matthew Drury (Clarence)
- Max Brown (Devonport)
- Aaron Cornelius (Glenorchy)
- Michael McGregor (Hobart City)
- Darren Winter (Lauderdale)
- Scott Stephens (Launceston)
- Zane Littlejohn (North Launceston)
- Mitch Hills (Western Storm)
- Adam Henley (Kingborough)

== 2014 Leading Goalkickers ==
- Aaron Cornelius (Glenorchy) - 76
- Trent Standen (Clarence) - 69
- James Charlesworth (Clarence) - 62
- Bart McCulloch (Western Storm) - 60
- Bradley Cox-Goodyer (North Launceston) - 52
- Jaye Bowden (Glenorchy) - 46

=== Highest Individual Goalkickers (Match) ===
- 12 – James Charlesworth (Clarence) v Kingborough – 24 August 2014 at Bellerive Oval
- 11 – Trent Standen (Clarence) v Kingborough – 13 July 2014 at Twin Ovals Complex
- 10 – Aaron Cornelius (Glenorchy) v Kingborough – 19 April 2014 at KGV Oval
- 10 – Jaye Bowden (Glenorchy) v Kingborough – 16 August 2014 at Twin Ovals Complex
- 8 – Ben Halton (Lauderdale) v Clarence – 9 August 2014 at Lauderdale Oval
- 8 – Allan O'Sign (North Launceston) v Kingborough – 5 July 2014 at York Park
- 8 – Chris McDonald (Burnie) v Launceston – 5 July 2014 at Windsor Park

== Premiership season ==
Source: TSL season 2014 results and fixtures

=== Round 3A (5 April) ===
- Western Storm 19.15 (129) def. Devonport 7.13 (55)

=== Round 1 (12 April) ===
- Kingborough 13.11 (89) def. by Devonport 16.17 (113)
- Lauderdale 21.18 (144) def. Hobart City 11.13 (79)
- Western Storm 7.16 (58) def. by Launceston 11.10 (76)
- Burnie 7.12 (54) def. by North Launceston 12.8 (80)
- Clarence 20.9 (129) def. Glenorchy 14.10 (94)

=== Round 2 (18 & 19 April) ===
- Lauderdale 10.18 (78) def. by Western Storm 14.10 (94)
- Hobart City 13.14 (92) def. by Clarence 20.16 (136)
- Devonport 15. 7 (97) def. Burnie 10.14 (74)
- North Launceston 21.18 (144) def. Launceston 10.5 (65)
- Glenorchy 23.19 (157) def. Kingborough 8.8 (56)

=== Round 3B (25–27 April) ===
- North Launceston 9.9 (63) def. by Clarence 14.14 (98)
- Burnie 12.12 (84) def. by Glenorchy 13.20 (98)
- Kingborough 8.6 (54) def. by Hobart City 11.16 (82)
- Launceston 1.4 (10) def. by Lauderdale 12.11 (83)

=== Round 4 (3 May) ===
- Devonport 10.9 (69) def. by Hobart City 12.15 (87)
- Clarence 20.16 (136) def. Launceston 10.5 (65)
- Glenorchy 14.9 (93) def. Lauderdale 6.17 (53)
- Kingborough 7.6 (48) def. by Burnie 22.20 (152)
- Western Storm 6.9 (45) def. by North Launceston 7.14 (56)

=== Round 5 (10 May) ===
- Burnie 5.14 (44) def. by Western Storm 9.14 (68)
- Lauderdale 7.10 (52) def. by Clarence 19.10 (124)
- Launceston 12.27 (99) def. Kingborough 5.4 (34)
- North Launceston 12.15 (87) def. Devonport 6.7 (43)
- Hobart City 11.9 (75) def. by Glenorchy 13.16 (94)

=== Round 6 (17 May) ===
- North Launceston 8.7 (55) def. by Burnie 19.10 (124)
- Devonport 17.11 (113) def. Launceston 8.13 (61)
- Glenorchy 9.11 (65) def. by Clarence 12.10 (82)
- Lauderdale 27.22 (184) def. Kingborough 6.6 (42)
- Western Storm 18.13 (121) def. Hobart City 6.6 (42)

=== Round 7 (24 May) ===
- Western Storm 18.12 (120) def. Glenorchy 14.13 (97)
- Clarence 21.18 (144) def. Devonport 7.4 (46)
- Burnie 19.12 (126) def. Launceston 12.7 (79)
- Hobart City 27.12 (174) def. Kingborough 11.7 (73)
- North Launceston 17.12 (114) def. Lauderdale 3.8 (26)

=== Round 8 (31 May) ===
- Glenorchy 26.25 (181) def. Kingborough 3.3 (21)
- Devonport 8.9 (57) def. by Western Storm 20.18 (138)
- Clarence 20.16 (136) def. Hobart City 8.11 (59)
- Lauderdale 13.11 (89) drew with. Burnie 13.11 (89)
- Launceston 6.8 (44) def. by North Launceston 16.11 (107)

=== Round 9 (7 & 8 June) ===
- Burnie 19.18 (132) def. Devonport 8.8 (56)
- Hobart City 6.15 (51) def. by North Launceston 14.13 (97)
- Lauderdale 10.18 (78) def. Glenorchy 9.13 (67)
- Kingborough 5.4 (34) def. by Clarence 30.18 (198)
- Launceston 9.6 (60) def. by Western Storm 14.15 (99)

=== Round 10 (14 June) ===
- Devonport 11.15 (81) def. North Launceston 11.9 (75)
- Clarence 9.11 (65) def. by Lauderdale 17.15 (117)
- Glenorchy 11.5 (71) def. by Burnie 14.15 (99)
- Hobart City 19.11 (125) def. Launceston 9.9 (63)
- Kingborough 4.13 (37) def. by Western Storm 27.19 (181)

=== Round 11 (28 & 29 June) ===
- Glenorchy 8.12 (60) def. Hobart City 7.10 (52)
- Clarence 26.15 (171) def. North Launceston 10.9 (69)
- Burnie 12.15 (87) def. Western Storm 5.11 (41)
- Launceston 18.12 (120) def. Devonport 6.4 (40)
- Lauderdale 8.19 (67) def. Kingborough 4.9 (33)

=== Round 12 (5 July) ===
- North Launceston 23.26 (164) def. Kingborough 8.3 (51)
- Devonport 11.9 (75) def. by Glenorchy 13.11 (89)
- Hobart City 10.14 (74) def. by Lauderdale 10.17 (77)
- Launceston 12.1 (73) def. by Burnie 15.12 (102)
- Western Storm 16.16 (112) def. Clarence 10.9 (69)

=== Round 13 (12 & 13 July) ===
- Western Storm 12.12 (84) def. North Launceston 12.8 (80)
- Burnie 16.9 (105) def. Hobart City 11.6 (72)
- Glenorchy 18.18 (126) def. Launceston 9.4 (58)
- Kingborough 2.4 (16) def. by Clarence 25.28 (178)
- Lauderdale 20.13 (133) def. Devonport 6.9 (45)

=== Round 14 (19 July) ===
- Devonport 15.5 (95) def. Western Storm 14.10 (94)
- Clarence 9.11 (65) def. by Hobart City 18.13 (121)
- Glenorchy 20.7 (127) def. Lauderdale 15.4 (94)
- Launceston 27.14 (176) def. Kingborough 2.2 (14)
- North Launceston 11.9 (75) def. Burnie 8.13 (61)

=== Round 15 (2 August) ===
- Clarence 11.7 (73) def. by Glenorchy 15.9 (99)
- Burnie 14.16 (100) def. Devonport 6.7 (43)
- Hobart City 8.4 (52) def. by Western Storm 18.19 (127)
- Launceston 7.8 (50) def. by North Launceston 13.9 (87)
- Kingborough 7.6 (48) def. by Lauderdale 20.19 (139)

=== Round 16 (9 August) ===
- Devonport 15.15 (105) def. Launceston 9.18 (72)
- Glenorchy 5.10 (40) def. by North Launceston 14.11 (105)
- Hobart City 22.17 (149) def. Kingborough 7.8 (50)
- Western Storm 19.5 (119) def. Burnie 17.14 (116)
- Lauderdale 11.16 (82) def. Clarence 10.7 (67)

=== Round 17 (16 & 17 August) ===
- Burnie 11.11 (77) def. by Clarence 12.17 (89)
- Lauderdale 16.14 (110) def. Hobart City 5.11 (41)
- North Launceston 22.10 (142) def. Devonport 7.4 (46)
- Kingborough 2.3 (15) def. by Glenorchy 28.12 (180)
- Western Storm 17.14 (116) def. Launceston 11.11 (77)

=== Round 18 (final round - 23 August) ===
- Hobart City 10.10 (70) def. Glenorchy 8.11 (59)
- North Launceston 15.9 (99) def. Western Storm 11.9 (75)
- Devonport 11.11 (77) def. by Lauderdale 22.13 (145)
- Launceston 6.8 (44) def. by Burnie 14.13 (97)
- Clarence 37.10 (232) def. Kingborough 3.2 (20)

== Ladder ==
2014 TSL Ladder
Pos	Team	Pld	W	L	D	PF	PA	PP	Pts
1	Clarence (MP)	18	13	5	0	2192	1282	171.0	52
2	Western Storm	18	13	5	0	1831	1277	143.4	52
3	North Launceston (P)	18	13	5	0	1689	1209	139.7	52
4	Lauderdale	18	12	5	1	1751	1290	135.7	50
5	Glenorchy	18	11	7	0	1798	1330	135.2	44
6	Burnie	18	10	7	1	1723	1297	132.8	42
7	Hobart City	18	7	11	0	1496	1650	90.7	28
8	Devonport	18	6	12	0	1256	1911	65.7	24
9	Launceston	18	4	14	0	1292	1712	75.5	16
10	Tigers FC	18	0	18	0	735	2805	26.2	0

Rules for classification: 1) points; 2) percentage; 3) number of points for.
(P) Premiers; (MP) Minor Premiers

== State League Finals series ==
=== Qualifying and Elimination Finals ===
	Qualifying Final
Saturday 30 August (2:00 pm)	Western Storm 6.6 (42)	def. by	North Launceston 19.10 (124)	Aurora Stadium	Report

	Elimination Final
Sunday 31 August (1:00 pm)	Lauderdale 17.8 (110)	def.	Glenorchy 11.11 (77)	North Hobart Oval	Report

=== Semi-finals ===
	1st Semi-final
Saturday 6 September (2:30pm)	Western Storm 13.14 (92)	def.	Lauderdale 13.7 (85)	Aurora Stadium	Report

	2nd Semi-final
Saturday 6 September (2:30pm)	Clarence 10.11 (71)	def. by	North Launceston 11.10 (76)	Blundstone Arena	Report

=== Preliminary final ===
	Preliminary Final
Saturday 13 September (2:10 pm)	Clarence 15.14 (104)	def. by	Western Storm 16.10 (106)	Blundstone Arena	Report

=== Grand Final ===
2014 TSL Grand Final
Sunday 21 September (2:15 pm)	North Launceston	def.	Western Storm	Aurora Stadium (crowd: 5,842)	Report
4.2 (26); 9.5 (59); 12.9 (81); 18.13 (121)	Q1; Q2; Q3; Final	1.1 (7); 4.1 (25); 7.2 (44); 10.2 (62)	Darrel Baldock Medal: Daniel Roozendaal (North Launceston); Television broadcast: ABC
A. O’Sign 3, C. Tarrant 3, M. VanDenBerg 3, B. Cox-Goodyer 3, Z. Burt 2, E. Petterwood 1, J. Ponting 1, L. Young 1, W. McBride 1	Goals	Z. Brown 4, T. Bardenhagen 2, A. Russell 2, J. Blackberry 1, C. Drake 1
D. Roozendaal, A. Cox-Goodyer, R. Worn, E. Petterwood, M. VanDenBerg, T. Whitford	Best	Z. Brown, T. Bardenhagen, C. Drake, W. Hanson, A. Russell, M. Hanson

== TSL Team Of The Year ==
2014 TSL Team of The Year
B:	Andrew Cox-Goodyer (North Launceston)	Adam Duggan (Lauderdale)	Harry Walters (Burnie)
HB:	Taylor Whitford (North Launceston)	Will Hanson (Western Storm)	Jordan Roberts (Clarence)
C:	Jake Cox (Clarence)	Matt Hanson (Western Storm)	Jay Blackberry (Western Storm)
HF:	Bradley Cox-Goodyer (North Launceston)	Bart McCulloch (Western Storm)	Jaye Bowden (Glenorchy)
F:	James Charlesworth (Clarence)	Aaron Cornelius (Glenorchy)	Trent Standen (Clarence)
Foll:	Jason Laycock (Burnie)	Jeromey Webberley (Clarence)	Brayden Webb (Glenorchy) (Captain)
Int:	Daniel Roozendaal (North Launceston)	Bryce Walsh (Lauderdale)	Thane Bardenhagen (Western Storm)
Int:	Kade Pitchford (Devonport)		
Coach:	Zane Littlejohn (North Launceston)		

== Foxtel Cup ==
Despite only forming as a new club in late 2013, the Western Storm were granted an invitation to compete in the Foxtel Cup knockout competition for 2014 ahead of 2013 runners-up Burnie. The Storm scored a stirring victory against reigning Foxtel Cup champions West Adelaide in their debut game in Adelaide. However, the long trip to Perth mid-week saw them defeated by WAFL club West Perth in the Semi-finals.

=== Round 1 ===
Game #1 29 April 2014; 20:05 CST	West Adelaide	57 - 61 stand alone game	Western Storm	Adelaide Oval match report match statistics
	2.1 (13); 4.4 (28); 7.4 (46); 8.9 (57)	match report	4.2 (26); 7.4 (46); 9.6 (60); 9.7 (61)
		Goals
	Hopton 2, Watchman 2, Dijksman, Schott, De Zylva.		Collis 2, McCulloch 2, Brown, Thomas, McGee, Russell, Barker.
		Bests
	De Zylva, Jennings, Dijksman, Nelson.		Hanson, Hills, Blackberry, Reinmuth, McCulloch.

=== Semi-finals ===
Semi-final #1 24 June 2014; 18:35 WST	Western Storm	23 - 97 stand alone game	West Perth	Patersons Stadium match report match statistics
	0.2 (2); 0.3 (3); 1.5 (11); 3.5 (23)	match report	3.3 (21); 7.5 (47); 11.6 (72); 15.7 (97)
		Goals
	A.Russell, W.Hanson, L.Barker		M.McPhee 3, S.Martin 3, M.Johnson 2 M.Guadagnin, K.Shannon, M.Crisp, B.Antonio, R.Bartholomew, T.Manzone, S.Marusic
		Bests
	J.Blackberry, M.Hanson, B.Thorp, T.Bardenhagen, J.Child		A.Lynch, J.Thrum, L.Meadows, S.Martin, B.Antonio, S.Marusic

== State game ==
The Tasmanian State League representative team competed against the North East Australian Football League representative team (which incorporates players from the four states and territories of the Northern Territory, Queensland, New South Wales and the Australian Capital Territory) on June 21.

	2014 State Game
Saturday 21 June (2:00 pm)	TSL 18.12 (120)	def.	NEAFL 12.7 (79)	Bellerive Oval
Lefroy Medal (TSL): Jason Laycock (Match Report)

== See also ==
- Australian rules football in Tasmania
