= 2010 TSL season =

- Teams: Burnie Dockers; Clarence Kangaroos; Devonport Magpies; Glenorchy Magpies; Hobart Tigers; Lauderdale Bombers; Launceston Blues; North Hobart Demons; North Launceston Bombers; South Launceston Bulldogs
- Premiers: Clarence

The 2010 AFL Tasmania TSL premiership season was an Australian Rules Football competition staged across Tasmania, Australian over eighteen roster rounds and nine finals series matches between 2 April and 18 September 2010.
The League was known as the Wrest Point Tasmanian State League under a commercial naming-rights sponsorship agreement with Wrest Point Casino in Hobart and Federal Group.

== Participating Clubs ==
- Burnie Dockers Football Club
- Clarence District Football Club
- Devonport Football Club
- Glenorchy District Football Club
- Hobart Football Club
- Lauderdale Football Club
- Launceston Football Club
- North Hobart Football Club
- North Launceston Football Club
- South Launceston Football Club

=== 2010 TSL Club Coaches ===
- Brent Plant (Burnie)
- Brett Geappen (Clarence)
- Errol Bourne (Devonport)
- Ben Reid (Glenorchy)
- Graham Fox (Hobart)
- Darren Winter (Lauderdale)
- Anthony Taylor (Launceston)
- Clinton Brown (North Hobart)
- Paul Atkins (North Launceston)
- Dale Chugg (South Launceston)

=== Leading Goalkickers: Tasmanian State League ===
- Brian Finch (Launceston) – 94
- Darren Crawford (Nth Launceston) – 66
- Trent Standen (Clarence) – 66
- Brett Geappen (Clarence) – 62
- Paul Allison (Nth Hobart) – 46

=== Medal Winners ===
- Brett Geappen (Clarence) – Tassie Medal
- Cameron Thurley (Clarence) – Darrel Baldock Medal (Best player in TSL Grand Final)
- Brett Geappen (Clarence) – Cazaly Medal (TSL Premiership coach)
- Brian Finch (Launceston) – Hudson Medal (TSL Leading goalkicker)
- Patrick Riley (North Hobart) – Eade Medal (TSL Colts)

=== Wrest Point TSL Under-19's Grand Final ===
- Nth Launceston 10.11 (71) v Clarence 7.8 (50) – Bellerive Oval

=== Statewide Reserves Grand Final ===
- Clarence 8.8 (56) v Nth Hobart 7.11 (53) – Bellerive Oval

=== Interstate Matches ===
Representative Match (Saturday, 12 June 2010)

- Queensland 23.26 (164) v Tasmania 13.7 (85) – Fankhauser Reserve, Gold Coast

== 2010 Tasmanian State League Ladder ==
Pos	Team	Pld	W	L	D	PF	PA	PP	Pts
1	Clarence	18	17	1	0	2101	1188	176.9	68
2	Launceston	18	14	4	0	1767	1218	145.1	56
3	Devonport	18	11	7	0	1497	1268	118.1	44
4	Glenorchy	18	10	8	0	1560	1669	93.5	40
5	North Hobart	18	9	9	0	1731	1397	123.9	36
6	North Launceston	18	9	9	0	1345	1390	96.8	36
7	Burnie Dockers	18	7	11	0	1354	1630	83.1	28
8	Lauderdale	18	6	12	0	1203	1669	72.1	24
9	Hobart	18	5	13	0	1488	1774	83.9	20
10	South Launceston	18	2	16	0	1027	1870	54.9	8

=== Round 1 ===
(Friday, 2 April. Saturday, 3 April & Monday, 5 April 2010)

- Nth Hobart 15.16 (106) v Hobart 7.8 (50) – TCA Ground (Friday)
- Launceston 15.11 (101) v Nth Launceston 8.9 (57) – Windsor Park (Friday)
- Burnie 9.10 (64) v Devonport 9.7 (61) – Devonport Oval (Friday Night)
- Sth Launceston 13.8 (86) v Lauderdale 12.10 (82) – North Hobart Oval (Saturday)
- Clarence 18.14 (122) v Glenorchy 11.8 (74) – Bellerive Oval (Monday Night)

=== Round 2 ===
(Saturday, 10 April & Sunday, 11 April 2010)

- Nth Hobart 18.15 (123) v Lauderdale 6.13 (49) – North Hobart Oval
- Clarence 20.15 (135) v Sth Launceston 8.9 (57) – Youngtown Memorial Ground
- Burnie 16.17 (113) v Launceston 13.5 (83) – West Park Oval
- Nth Launceston 11.10 (76) v Devonport 8.14 (62) – Aurora Stadium (Night)
- Glenorchy 20.6 (126) v Hobart 12.11 (83) – KGV Football Park (Sunday)

=== Round 3 ===
(Saturday, 17 April 2010)

- Clarence 22.21 (153) v Hobart 9.11 (65) – TCA Ground
- Launceston 18.10 (118) v Sth Launceston 9.7 (61) – Windsor Park
- Lauderdale 12.18 (90) v Glenorchy 13.7 (85) – KGV Football Park
- Nth Launceston 12.11 (83) v Burnie 6.11 (47) – Aurora Stadium (Night)
- Nth Hobart 18.14 (122) v Devonport 12.7 (79) – Devonport Oval (Night)

=== Round 4 ===
(Saturday, 24 April 2010)

- Hobart 14.14 (98) v Lauderdale 13.8 (86) – Lauderdale Sports Ground
- Devonport 7.18 (60) v Launceston 6.7 (43) – Windsor Park
- Nth Launceston 11.11 (77) v Sth Launceston 10.9 (69) – Youngtown Memorial Ground
- Glenorchy 16.13 (109) v Burnie 13.11 (89) – West Park Oval
- Clarence 13.14 (92) v Nth Hobart 9.21 (75) – Bellerive Oval (Night)

=== Round 5 ===
(Friday, 30 April & Saturday, 1 May 2010)

- Clarence 18.14 (122) v Lauderdale 4.3 (27) – Bellerive Oval (Friday Night)
- Nth Launceston 14.9 (93) v Glenorchy 9.10 (64) – KGV Football Park
- Hobart 20.16 (136) v Burnie 8.7 (55) – TCA Ground
- Nth Hobart 11.16 (82) v Launceston 9.12 (66) – North Hobart Oval
- Devonport 14.14 (98) v Sth Launceston 9.5 (59) – Devonport Oval (Night)

=== Round 6 ===
(Saturday, 8 May & Sunday, 9 May 2010)

- Devonport 16.12 (108) v Hobart 8.10 (58) – TCA Ground
- Clarence 21.11 (137) v Launceston 10.10 (70) – Windsor Park
- Nth Launceston 17.16 (118) v Lauderdale 8.10 (58) – Aurora Stadium
- Sth Launceston 14.8 (92) v Burnie 13.13 (91) – West Park Oval
- Glenorchy 15.17 (107) v Nth Hobart 14.10 (94) – North Hobart Oval (Sunday)

=== Round 7 ===
(Saturday, 15 May & Sunday, 16 May 2010)

- Clarence 17.17 (119) v Burnie 3.9 (27) – Bellerive Oval
- Nth Hobart 19.15 (129) v Lauderdale 8.12 (60) – Lauderdale Sports Ground
- Hobart 23.11 (149) v Sth Launceston 8.11 (59) – Youngtown Memorial Ground
- Launceston 19.13 (127) v Glenorchy 11.13 (79) – KGV Football Park
- Devonport 14.13 (97) v Nth Launceston 7.7 (49) – Aurora Stadium (Sunday)

=== Round 8 ===
(Saturday, 22 May 2010)

- Devonport 13.14 (92) v Lauderdale 10.3 (63) – Bellerive Oval (Double-Header)
- Clarence 18.7 (115) v Glenorchy 10.13 (73) – KGV Football Park
- Burnie 13.10 (88) v Nth Launceston 11.12 (78) – West Park Oval
- Launceston 12.7 (79) v Sth Launceston 9.8 (62) – Aurora Stadium
- Hobart 10.10 (70) v Nth Hobart 8.15 (63) – Bellerive Oval (Night)

=== Round 9 ===
(Friday, 28 May & Saturday, 29 May 2010)

- Nth Launceston 9.23 (77) v Sth Launceston 7.8 (50) – Aurora Stadium (Friday Night)
- Clarence 22.10 (142) v Nth Hobart 9.9 (63) – North Hobart Oval
- Lauderdale 10.11 (71) v Hobart 5.8 (38) – TCA Ground
- Devonport 16.12 (108) v Glenorchy 9.4 (58) – Devonport Oval
- Launceston 19.16 (130) v Burnie 7.6 (48) – Windsor Park

=== Round 10 ===
(Saturday, 5 June 2010)

- Clarence 15.19 (109) v Nth Launceston 12.11 (83) – Bellerive Oval
- Glenorchy 15.9 (99) v Hobart 13.8 (86) – KGV Football Park
- Nth Hobart 11.18 (84) v Burnie 9.9 (63) – West Park Oval
- Launceston 19.12 (126) v Lauderdale 6.7 (43) – Aurora Stadium (Double-Header)
- Devonport 8.10 (58) v Sth Launceston 5.6 (36) – Aurora Stadium (Night)

=== Round 11 ===
(Saturday, 19 June 2010)

- Glenorchy 15.15 (105) v Nth Hobart 13.13 (91) – North Hobart Oval
- Launceston 18.10 (118) v Devonport 6.8 (44) – Devonport Oval
- Clarence 12.12 (84) v Lauderdale 6.12 (48) – Lauderdale Sports Ground
- Nth Launceston 15.9 (99) v Hobart 14.11 (95) – Aurora Stadium
- Burnie 12.20 (92) v Sth Launceston 11.9 (75) – Youngtown Memorial Ground

=== Round 12 ===
(Saturday, 26 June 2010)

- Clarence 13.15 (93) v Hobart 8.11 (59) – North Hobart Oval (Double-Header)
- Nth Hobart 21.23 (149) v Sth Launceston 6.5 (41) – North Hobart Oval (Double-Header)
- Glenorchy 16.15 (111) v Lauderdale 7.6 (48) – KGV Football Park
- Launceston 12.13 (85) v Nth Launceston 9.10 (64) – Windsor Park
- Burnie 15.10 (100) v Devonport 11.19 (85) – West Park Oval

=== Round 13 ===
(Saturday, 3 July & Sunday, 4 July 2010)

- Clarence 18.7 (115) v Glenorchy 9.10 (64) – Bellerive Oval *
- Burnie 16.12 (108) v Nth Launceston 8.8 (56) – Aurora Stadium
- Devonport 15.16 (106) v Hobart 13.8 (86) – Devonport Oval
- Lauderdale 11.13 (79) v Nth Hobart 7.12 (54) – Lauderdale Sports Ground (Sunday)
- Launceston 20.12 (132) v Sth Launceston 4.8 (32) – Youngtown Memorial Ground (Sunday)

Note: Clarence wore their 1947-1978 maroon and white jumper for this match.

=== Round 14 ===
(Saturday, 10 July 2010)

- Clarence 17.13 (115) v Devonport 12.11 (83) – Bellerive Oval
- Nth Hobart 18.12 (120) v Hobart 10.8 (68) – North Hobart Oval
- Lauderdale 15.19 (109) v Nth Launceston 15.7 (97) – Lauderdale Sports Ground
- Launceston 15.11 (101) v Burnie 12.17 (89) – West Park Oval
- Glenorchy 16.15 (111) v Sth Launceston 8.12 (60) – Youngtown Memorial Ground

=== Round 15 (Split Round) ===
(Saturday, 17 July & Saturday, 24 July 2010)

- Glenorchy 15.14 (104) v Burnie 12.11 (83) – KGV Football Park (17 July)
- Devonport 17.11 (113) v Sth Launceston 4.13 (37) – Devonport Oval (17 July)
- Lauderdale 16.8 (104) v Hobart 11.11 (77) – TCA Ground (24 July)
- Launceston 15.10 (100) v Clarence 10.5 (65) – Windsor Park (24 July)
- Nth Launceston 10.13 (73) v Nth Hobart 9.11 (65) – Aurora Stadium (24 July)

=== Round 16 ===
(Friday, 30 July 2010 & Saturday, 31 July 2010)

- Nth Launceston 9.9 (63) v Sth Launceston 6.7 (43) – Aurora Stadium (Friday Night)
- Launceston 11.6 (72) v Devonport 10.8 (68) – Aurora Stadium
- Clarence 16.16 (112) v Nth Hobart 13.13 (91) – Bellerive Oval
- Hobart 19.14 (128) v Glenorchy 4.11 (35) – TCA Ground
- Lauderdale 9.16 (70) v Burnie 3.21 (39) – West Park Oval

=== Round 17 ===
(Friday, 6 August & Saturday, 7 August 2010)

- Devonport 16.9 (105) v Burnie 7.10 (52) – Devonport Oval (Friday Night)
- Launceston 9.16 (70) v Nth Launceston 6.6 (42) – Aurora Stadium (Friday Night)
- Nth Hobart 21.14 (140) v Sth Launceston 7.7 (49) – North Hobart Oval
- Glenorchy 9.10 (64) v Lauderdale 7.15 (57) – Lauderdale Sports Ground
- Clarence 22.13 (145) v Hobart 10.10 (70) – Bellerive Oval

=== Round 18 ===
(Saturday, 14 August 2010)

- Launceston 23.8 (146) v Hobart 11.6 (72) – TCA Ground *
- Glenorchy 12.20 (92) v Nth Hobart 12.8 (80) – KGV Football Park
- Devonport 8.22 (70) v Nth Launceston 8.12 (60) – Devonport Oval
- Clarence 19.12 (126) v Lauderdale 9.5 (59) – Lauderdale Sports Ground
- Burnie 15.16 (106) v Sth Launceston 8.11 (59) – West Park Oval

Note: Both Hobart (Cananore guernseys) and Launceston wore heritage strips for this match.

=== First Qualifying Final ===
(Saturday, 21 August 2010)

- Clarence: 3.6 (24) | 7.12 (54) | 8.18 (66) | 12.22 (94)
- Launceston: 1.0 (6) | 3.3 (21) | 8.4 (52) | 9.8 (62)
- Attendance: Not Available at Bellerive Oval

=== Second Qualifying Final ===
(Saturday, 21 August 2010)

- Devonport: 4.0 (24) | 5.4 (34) | 10.8 (68) | 13.12 (90)
- Glenorchy: 0.4 (4) | 4.6 (30) | 4.8 (32) | 5.10 (40)
- Attendance: Not Available at Devonport Oval (Night)

=== First Elimination Final ===
(Sunday, 22 August 2010)

- Nth Hobart: 1.2 (8) | 5.7 (37) | 9.9 (63) | 12.11 (83)
- Nth Launceston: 5.7 (37) | 7.10 (52) | 8.13 (61) | 10.15 (75)
- Attendance: Not Available at North Hobart Oval

=== Third Qualifying Final ===
(Saturday, 28 August 2010)

- Launceston: 6.3 (39) | 9.4 (58) | 13.6 (84) | 20.9 (129)
- Devonport: 1.4 (10) | 7.6 (48) | 8.11 (59) | 9.16 (70)
- Attendance: Not Available at Aurora Stadium

=== Second Elimination Final ===
(Sunday, 29 August 2010)

- Nth Hobart: 4.4 (28) | 8.7 (55) | 14.11 (95) | 21.12 (138)
- Glenorchy: 2.1 (13) | 4.7 (31) | 5.11 (41) | 11.14 (80)
- Attendance: Not Available at Bellerive Oval

=== First Semi Final ===
(Saturday, 4 September 2010)

- Devonport: 4.1 (25) | 5.2 (32) | 5.8 (38) | 5.11 (41)
- Nth Hobart: 2.1 (13) | 3.6 (24) | 3.6 (24) | 5.9 (39)
- Attendance: Not Available at Devonport Oval

=== Second Semi Final ===
(Saturday, 4 September 2010)

- Clarence: 3.5 (23) | 6.11 (47) | 8.13 (61) | 11.16 (82)
- Launceston: 2.1 (13) | 3.1 (19) | 3.2 (20) | 5.3 (33)
- Attendance: Not Available at Bellerive Oval

=== Preliminary Final ===
(Friday, 10 September 2010)

- Devonport: 3.2 (20) | 6.7 (43) | 9.11 (65) | 11.14 (80)
- Launceston: 3.1 (19) | 5.4 (34) | 7.9 (51) | 9.11 (65)
- Attendance: 1,241 at Aurora Stadium (Night)

=== Grand Final ===
(Saturday, 18 September 2010)

- Clarence: 5.3 (33) | 8.4 (52) | 9.10 (64) | 15.13 (103)
- Devonport: 2.2 (14) | 5.9 (39) | 5.9 (39) | 6.10 (46)
- Attendance: 6,123 at Bellerive Oval
