= Zane Littlejohn =

Australian rules footballer (born 1986)

- Littlejohn coaching Box Hill in 2025

Personal information
- Full name: Zane Patrick Littlejohn
- Born: 25 August 1986 (age 40); Launceston, Tasmania

Playing career
Years	Club	Games (Goals)
2002–2007	Latrobe	78
2008–2010	North Launceston	50

Coaching career
Years	Club	Games (W–L–D)
2012–2016	North Launceston	100 (60–40–0)
2023–2025	Box Hill	61 (42–19–0)

Career highlights
- TSL premiership coach: 2014, 2015; TSL U19s premiership coach: 2010; TSL Coach of the Year: 2014

Zane Patrick Littlejohn (born 25 August 1986) is an Australian rules football coach and former player who currently serves as an assistant coach at the North Melbourne Football Club in the Australian Football League (AFL). He previously served as the head coach of North Launceston in the Tasmanian State League (TSL) and the Box Hill Hawks in the Victorian Football League (VFL).

== Career ==
Littlejohn made his debut for Latrobe Football Club's under-18s team when he was 14 years old. He played his first Northern Tasmanian Football League (NTFL) reserves match on his 15th birthday and made his senior NTFL debut in 2002. He also played cricket while in high school, representing Tasmania at an under-15s level and playing for the Sheffield Cricket Club, where he was a right-handed batsman and right-arm medium fast bowler.

In 2007, Littlejohn played for the Tasmanian Devils in the Victorian Football League (VFL). Ahead of the 2008 season, he left Latrobe after 78 senior matches at the club due to travel commitments, joining the North Launceston Football Club. He remained at North Launceston when the club entered the newly reformed Tasmanian State League (TSL) in 2009. While still playing senior football, Littlejohn became the coach of North Launceston's under-18s team in 2010, leading the side to a grand final victory over Clarence. He retired from playing at the age of 24 and continued coaching North Launceston's under-18s (Colts) team in 2011.

North Launceston appointed Littlejohn as the club's senior men's coach in 2012. After finishing eighth on the ladder for two seasons in a row, he led the club to grand final victories over the Western Storm and Glenorchy in 2014 and 2015 respectively. North Launceston also reached the 2016 grand final under Littlejohn, but were defeated by Glenorchy by 20 points. In late 2016, he moved to Queensland to join the Brisbane Lions in the Australian Football League (AFL) as a development coach, working with the forward line. He served as the head coach of the Brisbane Lions Academy during the 2022 season.

On 14 October 2022, Littlejohn was appointed by the Hawthorn Football Club as a development coach, which also saw him become the senior coach of Hawthorn's reserves affiliate – the Box Hill Hawks – in the VFL. In his first season as coach, Box Hill reached the preliminary final but were defeated by Gold Coast at Heritage Bank Stadium. Littlejohn was appointed as the VFL's coach for an interstate representative match against the South Australian National Football League (SANFL) in April 2024, which the VFL lost by fourteen points. Box Hill finished sixth in the 2024 season and were eliminated from the finals series by Williamstown.

Littlejohn was re-appointed as the VFL's representative coach in 2025, leading the side to its first victory over the SANFL since 2002 with an eleven-point win at Tanunda Recreation Park. Box Hill finished second on the ladder but were defeated in the preliminary final by Footscray by 31 points. At the end of the season, Littlejohn left Hawthorn and Box Hill to join the North Melbourne Football Club as an assistant coach, working in the area of strategy.

== Statistics ==
=== Coaching statistics ===
Legend
W	Wins	L	Losses	D	Draws	W%	Winning percentage	LP	Ladder position	LT	League teams

Season	Team	League	Games	W	L	D	W %	Ladder
2010	North Launceston	TSL U19s	21	15	6	0	71.4%	1 / 10
2011	North Launceston	TSL U19s						
2012	North Launceston	TSL	18	6	12	0	33.3%	8 / 10
2013	North Launceston	TSL	18	6	12	0	33.3%	8 / 10
2014	North Launceston	TSL	21	16	5	0	76.2%	3 / 10
2015	North Launceston	TSL	22	16	6	0	72.7%	3 / 10
2016	North Launceston	TSL	21	16	5	0	76.2%	3 / 10
2022	Brisbane Lions Academy	NLB	3	1	2	0	33.3%	—
2023	Box Hill	VFL	21	15	6	0	71.4%	3 / 21
2024	Box Hill	VFL	19	12	7	0	63.2%	6 / 21
2025	Box Hill	VFL	21	15	6	0	71.4%	2 / 21
