= 2013 TSL season =

- Teams: Burnie Dockers; Clarence Kangaroos; Devonport Magpies; Glenorchy Magpies; Hobart Tigers; Lauderdale Bombers; Launceston Blues; North Hobart Demons; North Launceston Bombers; South Launceston Bulldogs
- Premiers: South Launceston

The 2013 AFL Tasmania TSL premiership season is a current Australian Rules Football competition staged across Tasmania, Australian over eighteen roster rounds and six finals series matches between 29 March and 21 September 2013.

The League is known as the RACT Insurance Tasmanian State League under a commercial naming-rights sponsorship agreement with the motoring insurance company.

South Launceston won the premiership after defeating Burnie in the grand final.

== Participating Clubs ==
- Burnie Dockers Football Club
- Clarence District Football Club
- Devonport Football Club
- Glenorchy District Football Club
- Hobart Football Club
- Lauderdale Football Club
- Launceston Football Club
- North Hobart Football Club
- North Launceston Football Club
- South Launceston Football Club

=== 2013 TSL Club Coaches ===
- Brent Plant (Burnie)
- Matthew Drury (Clarence)
- Paul Griffiths (Devonport)
- Ben Beams (Glenorchy)
- Anthony McConnon (Hobart)
- Darren Winter (Lauderdale)
- Anthony Taylor (Launceston)
- Lance Spaulding (North Hobart)
- Zane Littlejohn (North Launceston)
- Mitch Thorp (South Launceston)

=== 2013 Foxtel Cup ===
(Saturday, 20 April 2013)

- – Southport (NEAFL) 11.11 (77) v Burnie (TSL) 7.7 (49) – Metricon Stadium Gold Coast

== 2013 Tasmanian State League results ==
=== 2013 TSL Ladder ===
Pos	Team	Pld	W	L	D	PF	PA	PP	Pts
1	South Launceston*	18	15	3	0	1971	1138	173.2	60
2	Burnie	18	14	4	0	1831	1303	140.5	56
3	Launceston	18	12	6	0	1577	1182	133.4	48
4	Clarence	18	12	6	0	1708	1294	132.0	48
5	Lauderdale	18	11	7	0	1438	1324	108.6	44
6	Glenorchy	18	9	9	0	1425	1529	93.2	36
7	North Hobart*	18	7	11	0	1315	1641	80.1	28
8	North Launceston	18	6	12	0	1461	1392	105.0	24
9	Devonport	18	2	16	0	1128	2086	54.1	8
10	Hobart*	18	2	16	0	1112	2077	53.5	8

Source: TSL season 2013 results

=== 2013 TSL Finals Series ===
2013 TSL FINALS Series

Final	Team	G	B	Pts	Team	G	B	Pts
Elimination Final	Clarence	17	14	116	Lauderdale	14	14	98
Qualifying Final	Burnie	19	9	93	Launceston	13	16	94
1st Semi Final	Launceston	19	20	134	Clarence	12	13	85
2nd Semi Final	South Launceston*	21	11	137	Burnie	11	7	73
Preliminary Final	Launceston	9	6	60	Burnie	10	14	74
Grand Final	South Launceston*	10	14	74	Burnie	9	11	65

- Note that South Launceston withdrew from the competition at the end of the 2013 season and were replaced by the Western Storm Football Club
- Note that North Hobart withdrew from the competition at the end of the 2013 season and were replaced by the Hobart City Football Club
- Note that Hobart withdrew from the competition at the end of the 2013 season and were replaced by Kingborough Football Club, which stylises itself as Tigers FC

== State game ==
The TSL representative team competed against the NEAFL's NSW/ACT representative team in 2013.

State Game 8 June 2013; 2:00 EST	NSW/ACT (NEAFL East)	61 - 101 stand alone game	Tasmania (TSL)	Skoda Stadium, Sydney match report
	8.13 (61)	match report	15.11 (101)
		Goals
	J. Bennett 4, A. Dess 2, W. Griggs 2		M. Thorp 6, B. McCulloch 3, S. Whiting 3, J. Blackberry 2, B. Jones 1
		Bests
	K. Stevens, J. Van Meurs, M. O’Dywer, T. Barton, A. Vandenberg, W. Griggs		B. McCulloch, M. Thorp, N. McKenna, S. Carins, J. Bowden, D. Banham
