= 2012 TSL season =

- Date: 31 March – 22 September 2012
- Teams: Burnie Dockers; Clarence Kangaroos; Devonport Magpies; Glenorchy Magpies; Hobart Tigers; Lauderdale Bombers; Launceston Blues; North Hobart Demons; North Launceston Bombers; South Launceston Bulldogs
- Premiers: Burnie

The 2012 AFL Tasmania TSL premiership season was an Australian rules football competition staged across Tasmania, Australia, over eighteen roster rounds plus one Regional round and six finals series matches, between 31 March and 22 September 2012.

The League is known as the Wrest Point Tasmanian State League under a commercial naming-rights sponsorship agreement with Wrest Point Casino in Hobart and Federal Group.

== Participating Clubs ==
- Burnie Dockers Football Club
- Clarence District Football Club
- Devonport Football Club
- Glenorchy District Football Club
- Hobart Football Club
- Lauderdale Football Club
- Launceston Football Club
- North Hobart Football Club
- North Launceston Football Club
- South Launceston Football Club

=== 2012 TSL Club Coaches ===
- Brent Plant (Burnie)
- Matthew Drury (Clarence)
- Glen Lutwyche (Devonport)
- Ben Beams (Glenorchy)
- Anthony McConnon (Hobart)
- Darren Winter (Lauderdale)
- Anthony Taylor (Launceston)
- Lance Spaulding (North Hobart)
- Zane Littlejohn (North Launceston)
- Mitch Thorp (South Launceston)

=== Current Leading Goalkickers: Tasmanian State League ===
- Mitchell Williamson (Clarence) - 83
- Adam Derbyshire (Launceston) - 71
- Trent Standen (Clarence) - 50
- Jaye Bowden (Glenorchy) - 48
- Michael Cassidy (Lauderdale) - 46
- Aaron McNab (Devonport) - 45

=== Medal Winners ===
- Jaye Bowden (Glenorchy) - Tassie Medal (TSL Seniors)
- Joe Edwards (Lauderdale) - Eade Medal (TSL Colts)
- Jason Laycock (Burnie) - Darrel Baldock Medal (Best player in TSL Grand Final)
- Mitchell Williamson (Clarence) - Hudson Medal (TSL Leading Goalkicker)
- Aaron McNab (Devonport) - TSL Rookie of the Year.

=== TSL Colts Grand Final ===
- Nth Launceston 11.9 (75) v Launceston 10.13 (73) - Aurora Stadium

=== Interstate Matches ===
Interstate Match (Saturday, 26 May 2012)

- Victoria 20.17 (137) v Tasmania 3.11 (29) – Att: 1,236 at Blundstone Arena

=== 2012 Foxtel Cup ===
(Saturday, 31 March 2012) -

- Morningside (NEAFL) 12.10 (82) v Launceston (TSL) 7.7 (49) – Metricon Stadium, Gold Coast *

Note: This match was played as a curtain-raiser to the Gold Coast Suns v Adelaide Crows AFL fixture which drew an attendance of 12,790.

(Saturday, 14 April 2012)

- – Werribee (VFL) 26.9 (165) v Burnie (TSL) 5.2 (32) – Etihad Stadium, Melbourne *

Note: This match was played as a curtain-raiser to the St Kilda v Western Bulldogs AFL fixture which drew an attendance of 28,971.

== 2012 Tasmanian State League Ladder ==
Pos	Team	Pld	W	L	D	PF	PA	PP	Pts
1	Burnie	18	16	2	0	2034	1056	192.6	64
2	Clarence	18	14	4	0	1964	1254	156.6	56
3	Launceston	18	14	4	0	1641	1261	130.1	56
4	Lauderdale	18	14	4	0	1726	1343	128.5	56
5	Glenorchy	18	11	7	0	1650	1256	131.4	44
6	North Hobart	18	7	11	0	1428	1573	90.8	28
7	South Launceston	18	6	12	0	1311	1468	89.3	24
8	North Launceston	18	6	12	0	1334	1565	85.2	24
9	Devonport	18	2	16	0	1288	2088	61.7	8
10	Hobart	18	0	18	0	778	2290	34.0	0

=== Regional Season Openers ===
(Saturday, 31 March 2012)

- Burnie 20.12 (132) v Nth Hobart 10.14 (74) – West Park Oval
- Lauderdale 11.19 (85) v Hobart 6.8 (44) – Lauderdale Sports Ground (Twilight)
- Nth Launceston 14.14 (98) v Devonport 11.5 (71) – Aurora Stadium (Saturday Night)

=== Round 1 ===
(Wednesday, 4 April & Friday, 6 April 2012)

- Clarence 15.10 (100) v Glenorchy 9.6 (60) – KGV Football Park (Wednesday Night)
- Nth Hobart 17.17 (119) v Hobart 10.8 (68) – North Hobart Oval (Friday)
- Lauderdale 17.18 (120) v Sth Launceston 13.12 (90) – Lauderdale Sports Ground (Friday)
- Launceston 13.19 (97) v Nth Launceston 12.15 (87) – Aurora Stadium (Friday Night)
- Burnie 25.14 (164) v Devonport 8.2 (50) – Devonport Oval (Friday Night)

=== Round 2 ===
(Friday, 13 April & Saturday, 14 April 2012)

- Lauderdale 13.9 (87) v Glenorchy 6.12 (48) – KGV Football Park (Friday Night)
- Clarence 28.20 (188) v Hobart 4.7 (31) – TCA Ground
- Launceston 22.12 (144) v Devonport 11.8 (74) – Windsor Park
- Sth Launceston 14.11 (95) v Nth Launceston 8.11 (59) – Youngtown Memorial Ground

=== Round 3 ===
(Friday, 20 April & Saturday, 21 April 2012)

- Clarence 20.16 (136) v Nth Hobart 5.9 (39) - Blundstone Arena (Friday Night)
- Glenorchy 16.17 (113) v Hobart 9.8 (62) - TCA Ground
- Burnie 17.15 (117) v Lauderdale 8.9 (57) - Lauderdale Sports Ground
- Launceston 11.13 (79) v Sth Launceston 7.11 (53) - Windsor Park
- Nth Launceston 19.20 (134) v Devonport 10.12 (72) - Devonport Oval (Saturday Night)

=== Round 4 ===
(Saturday, 28 April & Sunday, 29 April 2012)

- Clarence 18.12 (120) v Devonport 4.8 (32) - Blundstone Arena
- Sth Launceston 15.17 (107) v Hobart 6.5 (41) - Youngtown Memorial Ground
- Glenorchy 9.13 (67) v Nth Launceston 3.12 (30) - KGV Football Park (Night)
- Burnie 22.17 (149) v Launceston 3.5 (23) - West Park Oval (Sunday)
- Lauderdale 13.8 (86) v Nth Hobart 11.8 (74) - North Hobart Oval (Sunday)

=== Round 5 ===
(Saturday, 5 May & Sunday, 6 May 2012)

- Clarence 16.19 (115) v Lauderdale 10.10 (70) - Blundstone Arena
- Burnie 20.14 (134) v Nth Launceston 14.8 (92) - Aurora Stadium
- Launceston 13.11 (89) v Glenorchy 12.10 (82) - KGV Football Park (Night)
- Sth Launceston 13.12 (90) v Devonport 10.15 (75) - Devonport Oval (Night)
- Nth Hobart 12.17 (89) v Hobart 13.5 (83) - TCA Ground (Sunday)

=== Round 6 ===
(Saturday, 12 May 2012)

- Nth Launceston 14.11 (95) v Nth Hobart 8.12 (60) - North Hobart Oval
- Clarence 14.18 (102) v Sth Launceston 10.10 (70) - Youngtown Memorial Ground
- Burnie 9.11 (65) v Glenorchy 9.4 (58) - West Park Oval
- Launceston 18.15 (123) v Devonport 11.8 (74) - Aurora Stadium

=== Round 7 ===
(Saturday, 19 May & Sunday, 20 May 2012)

- Burnie 22.24 (156) v Hobart 4.8 (32) - TCA Ground
- Glenorchy 14.17 (101) v Nth Hobart 8.14 (62) - KGV Football Park
- Lauderdale 16.12 (108) v Devonport 13.7 (85) - Devonport Oval
- Clarence 12.20 (92) v Launceston 11.6 (72) - Blundstone Arena (Night)
- Sth Launceston 13.8 (86) v Nth Launceston 12.9 (81) - Youngtown Memorial Ground (Sunday)

=== Round 8 ===
(Saturday, 2 June & Sunday, 3 June 2012)

- Nth Hobart 16.9 (105) v Devonport 13.12 (90) - North Hobart Oval
- Burnie 17.17 (119) v Sth Launceston 7.11 (53) - West Park Oval
- Clarence 22.13 (145) v Hobart 7.6 (48) - TCA Ground (Sunday)
- Lauderdale 17.7 (109) v Glenorchy 8.6 (54) - Lauderdale Sports Ground (Sunday)
- Launceston 10.10 (70) v Nth Launceston 8.6 (54) - Windsor Park (Sunday)

=== Round 9 ===
(Friday, 8 June. Saturday, 9 June & Sunday, 10 June 2012)

- Glenorchy 17.15 (117) v Hobart 6.1 (37) - KGV Football Park (Friday Night)
- Lauderdale 12.21 (93) v Nth Hobart 9.8 (62) - Lauderdale Sports Ground
- Clarence 14.12 (96) v Nth Launceston 10.9 (69) - Aurora Stadium
- Launceston 17.10 (112) v Sth Launceston 6.13 (49) - Youngtown Memorial Ground
- Burnie 11.18 (84) v Devonport 9.13 (67) - Devonport Oval (Sunday)

=== Round 10 ===
(Saturday, 16 June & Sunday, 17 June 2012)

- Glenorchy 15.10 (100) v Clarence 10.10 (70) - Blundstone Arena
- Nth Hobart 8.8 (56) v Sth Launceston 4.9 (33) - Youngtown Memorial Ground
- Burnie 13.10 (88) v Launceston 6.10 (46) - West Park Oval
- Lauderdale 16.11 (107) v Hobart 8.7 (55) - TCA Ground (Sunday)

=== Round 11 ===
(Saturday, 23 June 2012)

- Clarence 16.12 (108) v Burnie 13.4 (82) - Blundstone Arena
- Nth Hobart 17.16 (118) v Hobart 5.4 (34) - North Hobart Oval
- Lauderdale 17.14 (116) v Nth Launceston 11.11 (77) - Aurora Stadium
- Launceston 14.11 (95) v Glenorchy 12.6 (78) - Windsor Park
- Devonport 11.16 (82) v Sth Launceston 12.9 (81) - Devonport Oval

=== Round 12 A ===
(Saturday, 30 June & Sunday, 1 July 2012)

- Devonport 17.11 (113) v Hobart 14.14 (98) - TCA Ground
- Clarence 12.7 (79) v Lauderdale 11.9 (75) - Lauderdale Sports Ground
- Launceston 10.8 (68) v Nth Hobart 9.4 (58) - Windsor Park
- Burnie 14.15 (99) v Nth Launceston 7.5 (47) - West Park Oval *
- Glenorchy 15.12 (102) v Sth Launceston 7.17 (59) - KGV Football Park (Sunday)

Note: Burnie wore Black and Gold playing colours to honour the 1962 Burnie Tigers NWFU premiership team.

=== Round 12 B ===
(Sunday, 8 July 2012)

- Burnie 19.16 (130) v Sth Launceston 11.9 (75) - Youngtown Memorial Ground
- Bye: Clarence, Lauderdale, Launceston, Glenorchy, Nth Hobart, Nth Launceston, Devonport & Hobart.

=== Round 13 ===
(Saturday, 14 July & Sunday, 15 July 2012)

- Glenorchy 18.4 (112) v Lauderdale 7.13 (55) - KGV Football Park
- Clarence 13.5 (83) v Nth Hobart 10.9 (69) - Blundstone Arena
- Nth Launceston 14.14 (98) v Hobart 2.9 (21) - Aurora Stadium
- Launceston 12.21 (93) v Devonport 7.7 (49) - Devonport Oval

=== Round 14 ===
(Friday, 20 July. Saturday, 21 July & Sunday 22 July 2012)

- Nth Launceston 10.9 (69) v Sth Launceston 5.8 (38) - Aurora Stadium (Friday Night)
- Nth Hobart 14.14 (98) v Glenorchy 9.11 (65) - North Hobart Oval
- Clarence 30.14 (194) v Hobart 2.6 (18) - Blundstone Arena
- Burnie 23.15 (153) v Devonport 8.7 (55) - West Park Oval
- Lauderdale 15.18 (108) v Launceston 10.11 (71) - Lauderdale Sports Ground (Sunday)

=== Round 15 A ===
(Saturday, 26 July & Monday, 28 July 2012)

- Sth Launceston 18.16 (124) v Hobart 6.6 (42) - TCA Ground
- Glenorchy 14.14 (98) v Clarence 10.10 (70) - KGV Football Park (Monday Night)

=== Round 15 B ===
(Saturday, 4 August 2012)

- Nth Hobart 14.17 (101) v Nth Launceston 10.8 (68) - North Hobart Oval
- Launceston 13.14 (92) v Burnie 10.5 (65) - Windsor Park
- Lauderdale 21.6 (132) v Devonport 14.6 (90) - Devonport Oval

=== Round 16 ===
(Saturday, 11 August 2012)

- Glenorchy 22.18 (150) v Hobart 3.3 (21) - KGV Football Park
- Lauderdale 14.12 (96) v Nth Hobart 9.9 (63) - Lauderdale Sports Ground
- Launceston 24.14 (158) v Nth Launceston 3.3 (21) - Windsor Park
- Sth Launceston 19.16 (130) v Devonport 11.5 (71) - Youngtown Memorial Ground
- Burnie 17.19 (121) v Clarence 9.9 (63) - West Park Oval

=== Round 17 ===
(Saturday, 18 August & Sunday, 19 August 2012)

- Lauderdale 16.27 (123) v Hobart 3.3 (21) - TCA Ground (Twilight Match)
- Burnie 16.17 (113) v Nth Launceston 6.8 (44) - Aurora Stadium
- Launceston 9.11 (65) v Sth Launceston 8.10 (58) - Youngtown Memorial Ground
- Glenorchy 18.12 (120) v Devonport 9.13 (67) - Devonport Oval
- Clarence 17.15 (117) v Nth Hobart 15.11 (101) - North Hobart Oval (Sunday)

=== Round 18 ===
(Saturday, 25 August 2012)

- Glenorchy 17.23 (125) v Nth Hobart 13.2 (80) - North Hobart Oval
- Lauderdale 14.15 (99) v Clarence 13.8 (86) - Lauderdale Sports Ground
- Nth Launceston 16.15 (111) v Devonport 10.11 (71) - Aurora Stadium
- Launceston 21.18 (144) v Hobart 3.4 (22) - Windsor Park
- Burnie 8.15 (63) v Sth Launceston 2.8 (20) - West Park Oval

=== Elimination Final ===
(Saturday, 1 September 2012)

- Lauderdale: 3.1 (19) | 6.2 (38) | 10.3 (63) | 14.8 (92)
- Glenorchy: 6.0 (36) | 9.3 (57) | 13.5 (83) | 13.5 (83)
- Attendance: 3,172 at North Hobart Oval (Double-Header)

=== Qualifying Final ===
(Saturday, 1 September 2012)

- Launceston: 5.0 (30) | 6.3 (39) | 12.3 (75) | 18.9 (117)
- Clarence: 1.4 (10) | 4.7 (31) | 6.10 (46) | 8.16 (64)
- Attendance: 3,172 at North Hobart Oval (Double-Header)

=== First Semi Final ===
(Sunday, 9 September 2012)

- Clarence: 4.2 (26) | 7.8 (50) | 10.8 (68) | 16.11 (107)
- Lauderdale: 6.4 (40) | 10.6 (66) | 12.7 (79) | 14.8 (92)
- Attendance: 2,174 at North Hobart Oval

=== Second Semi Final ===
(Sunday, 9 September 2012)

- Burnie: 5.4 (34) | 6.5 (41) | 15.9 (99) | 17.10 (112)
- Launceston: 1.0 (6) | 4.6 (30) | 5.6 (36) | 9.13 (67)
- Attendance: 1,692 at West Park Oval

=== Preliminary Final ===
(Saturday, 15 September 2012)

- Launceston: 2.4 (16) | 4.10 (34) | 5.12 (42) | 9.14 (68)
- Clarence: 1.1 (7) | 3.2 (20) | 7.8 (50) | 8.12 (60)
- Attendance: 1,727 at Aurora Stadium (Night)

=== Grand Final ===
(Sunday, 22 September 2012)

- Burnie: 3.5 (23) | 8.9 (57) | 13.11 (89) | 16.14 (110)
- Launceston: 2.3 (15) | 3.4 (22) | 4.6 (30) | 9.8 (62)
- Attendance: 5,569 at Aurora Stadium
