= 2011 TSL season =

- Teams: Burnie Dockers; Clarence Kangaroos; Devonport Magpies; Glenorchy Magpies; Hobart Tigers; Lauderdale Bombers; Launceston Blues; North Hobart Demons; North Launceston Bombers; South Launceston Bulldogs
- Premiers: Launceston

The 2011 AFL Tasmania TSL premiership season was an Australian Rules Football competition staged across Tasmania, Australia over eighteen roster rounds and six finals series matches between 2 April and 24 September 2011.

The League is known as the Wrest Point Tasmanian State League under a commercial naming-rights sponsorship agreement with Wrest Point Casino in Hobart and Federal Group.
On 9 August 2011, AFL Tasmania ruled that official records from the previous TFL Statewide League, TSFL and SWL competitions were now declared null and void in respect to the current TSL and that records would start from 2009 onwards.

== Participating Clubs ==
- Burnie Dockers Football Club
- Clarence District Football Club
- Devonport Football Club
- Glenorchy District Football Club
- Hobart Football Club
- Lauderdale Football Club
- Launceston Football Club
- North Hobart Football Club
- North Launceston Football Club
- South Launceston Football Club

=== 2011 TSL Club Coaches ===
- Brent Plant (Burnie)
- Brett Geappen (Clarence)
- Glen Lutwyche (Devonport)
- Byron Howard Jnr & Kim Excell (Glenorchy)
- Graham Fox (Hobart)
- Darren Winter (Lauderdale)
- Anthony Taylor (Launceston)
- Clinton Brown & Lance Spaulding (North Hobart)
- Jeff Dunne (North Launceston)
- Dale Chugg & Mitch Hills (South Launceston)

=== Current Leading Goalkickers: Tasmanian State League ===
- Brian Finch (Launceston) – 105
- Cameron Thurley (Clarence) – 63
- Sonny Whiting (Launceston) – 59
- Trent Standen (Clarence) – 58
- Rohan Baldock (Burnie) – 54

=== Medal Winners ===
- Tim Bristow (Launceston) – Tassie Medal
- Nathan O'Donoghue (Launceston) – Darrel Baldock Medal (Best player in TSL Grand Final)
- Anthony Taylor (Launceston) – Cazaly Medal (TSL Premiership coach)
- Brian Finch (Launceston) – Hudson Medal (TSL Leading goalkicker)
- Tom Arnold (North Hobart) – Eade Medal (TSL Colts)

=== TSL Colts Grand Final ===
- Launceston 14.12 (96) v Clarence 10.10 (70) – Aurora Stadium

=== 2011 Foxtel Cup ===
(Saturday, 23 April 2011) - (Match Report)

- Claremont (WAFL) 14.18 (102) v Clarence (TSL) 4.7 (31) – Att: N/A at Bellerive Oval (Night)

== 2011 Tasmanian State League Ladder ==
Pos	Team	Pld	W	L	D	PF	PA	PP	Pts
1	Launceston	18	18	0	0	2353	911	258.3	72
2	Clarence	18	14	4	0	2090	1220	171.3	56
3	Burnie	18	12	6	0	1851	1279	144.7	48
4	North Hobart	18	11	7	0	1782	1511	117.9	44
5	Glenorchy	18	10	8	0	1608	1450	110.9	40
6	Lauderdale	18	9	9	0	1468	1396	105.2	36
7	North Launceston	18	9	9	0	1545	1628	94.9	36
8	Hobart	18	3	15	0	1297	1921	67.5	12
9	South Launceston	18	3	15	0	1139	2265	50.3	12
10	Devonport	18	1	17	0	975	2527	38.6	4

=== Season Opener (Part Round 3) ===
(Saturday, 2 April 2011)
Glenorchy 16.6 (102) d Clarence 9.12 (66) – KGV Oval (Night)

=== Round 1 ===
(Friday, 8 April & Saturday, 9 April 2011)
North Launceston 22.14 (146) d South Launceston 9.9 (63) – Aurora Stadium (Friday Night)
Glenorchy 17.14 (116) d Hobart 10.6 (66) – TCA Ground
Nth Hobart 15.9 (99) d Lauderdale 10.16 (76) – Lauderdale Oval
Launceston 30.20 (200) d Devonport 6.4 (40) – Windsor Park
Clarence 15.13 (103) d Burnie 10.11 (71) – West Park Oval

=== Round 2 ===
(Saturday, 16 April & Sunday, 17 April 2011)

- Launceston 18.9 (117) v Nth Hobart 16.6 (102) – North Hobart Oval
- Clarence 19.14 (128) v Hobart 6.10 (46) – Bellerive Oval
- Nth Launceston 20.17 (137) v Devonport 4.8 (32) – Devonport Oval (Night)
- Glenorchy 17.19 (121) v Lauderdale 6.11 (47) – KGV Football Park (Night)
- Burnie 13.9 (87) v Sth Launceston 11.6 (72) – Youngtown Memorial Ground (Sunday)

=== Round 3 ===
(Friday, 22 April & Saturday, 23 April 2011)

- Nth Hobart 15.11 (101) v Hobart 13.16 (94) – TCA Ground (Friday)
- Launceston 23.15 (153) v Nth Launceston 8.8 (56) – Windsor Park (Friday)
- Burnie 19.13 (127) v Devonport 9.6 (60) – West Park Oval (Friday)
- Lauderdale 13.12 (90) v Sth Launceston 5.10 (40) – Youngtown Memorial Ground (Saturday)

=== Round 4 ===
(Saturday, 30 April & Sunday, 1 May 2011)

- Glenorchy 17.10 (112) v Nth Launceston 10.12 (72) – Aurora Stadium
- Lauderdale 14.12 (96) v Hobart 13.9 (87) – Lauderdale Sports Ground
- Nth Hobart 16.13 (109) v Burnie 7.13 (55) – North Hobart Oval
- Launceston 14.14 (98) v Clarence 11.15 (81) – Bellerive Oval (Night)
- Devonport 19.14 (128) v Sth Launceston 11.14 (80) – Devonport Oval (Sunday)

=== Round 5 ===
(Saturday, 7 May & Saturday, 14 May 2011)

- Hobart 25.13 (163) v Devonport 11.5 (71) – TCA Ground
- Burnie 20.11 (131) v Nth Launceston 12.15 (87) – West Park Oval
- Nth Hobart 16.12 (108) v Glenorchy 10.13 (73) – KGV Football Park (Night)
- Clarence 8.19 (67) v Lauderdale 7.14 (56) – Bellerive Oval (14 May)
- Launceston 28.18 (186) v Sth Launceston 5.6 (36) – Windsor Park (14 May)

=== Round 6 ===
(Saturday, 21 May & Sunday, 22 May 2011)

- Clarence 20.13 (133) v Nth Hobart 17.14 (116) – North Hobart Oval
- Launceston 20.14 (134) v Burnie 12.6 (78) – Windsor Park
- Lauderdale 17.17 (119) v Devonport 6.10 (46) – Devonport Oval
- Nth Launceston 19.16 (130) v Sth Launceston 8.15 (63) – Aurora Stadium (Night)
- Hobart 17.9 (111) v Glenorchy 11.18 (84) – TCA Ground (Sunday)

=== Round 7 ===
(Saturday, 28 May 2011)

- Glenorchy 32.19 (211) v Devonport 4.2 (26) – KGV Football Park
- Nth Launceston 17.6 (108) v Nth Hobart 13.16 (94) – Aurora Stadium
- Launceston 13.8 (86) v Lauderdale 8.13 (61) – Lauderdale Sports Ground
- Clarence 33.19 (217) v Sth Launceston 6.6 (42) – Bellerive Oval
- Burnie 20.12 (132) v Hobart 8.9 (57) – West Park Oval

=== Round 8 ===
(Friday, 3 June & Saturday, 4 June 2011)

- Launceston 13.14 (92) v Nth Launceston 8.6 (54) – Aurora Stadium (Friday Night)
- Nth Hobart 10.13 (73) v Hobart 10.11 (71) – North Hobart Oval
- Lauderdale 16.10 (106) v Glenorchy 11.10 (76) – Lauderdale Sports Ground
- Clarence 23.20 (158) v Devonport 5.3 (33) – Devonport Oval
- Burnie 25.14 (164) v Sth Launceston 5.4 (34) – Youngtown Memorial Ground

=== Round 9 ===
(Saturday, 18 June & Sunday, 19 June 2011)

- Clarence 15.21 (111) v Glenorchy 10.5 (65) – Bellerive Oval
- Nth Launceston 13.13 (91) v Hobart 9.9 (63) – TCA Ground
- Burnie 13.11 (89) v Lauderdale 9.3 (57) – West Park Oval
- Sth Launceston 14.12 (96) v Devonport 7.9 (51) – Youngtown Memorial Ground (Sunday)
- Launceston 21.10 (136) v Nth Hobart 3.6 (24) – Windsor Park (Sunday)

=== Round 10 ===
(Saturday, 25 June & Sunday, 26 June 2011)

- Glenorchy 24.20 (164) v Sth Launceston 11.5 (71) – KGV Football Park
- Lauderdale 16.16 (112) v Nth Hobart 11.11 (77) – North Hobart Oval
- Launceston 25.18 (168) v Devonport 6.2 (38) – Devonport Oval
- Nth Launceston 8.10 (58) v Burnie 7.11 (53) – Aurora Stadium (Sunday)
- Clarence 23.19 (157) v Hobart 3.6 (24) – TCA Ground (Sunday)

=== Round 11 ===
(Saturday, 2 July 2011)

- Nth Hobart 15.10 (100) v Glenorchy 11.3 (69) – North Hobart Oval
- Clarence 20.21 (141) v Lauderdale 11.9 (75) – Lauderdale Sports Ground
- Nth Launceston 17.9 (111) v Devonport 12.3 (75) – Aurora Stadium
- Launceston 21.14 (140) v Burnie 9.13 (67) – West Park Oval
- Sth Launceston 18.3 (111) v Hobart 11.9 (75) – Youngtown Memorial Ground

=== Round 12 ===
(Saturday, 9 July & Sunday, 10 July 2011)

- Glenorchy 4.11 (35) v Hobart 0.6 (6) – KGV Football Park
- Lauderdale 15.19 (109) v Nth Launceston 7.10 (52) – Lauderdale Sports Ground
- Clarence 12.14 (86) v Nth Hobart 6.6 (42) – Bellerive Oval
- Burnie 17.13 (115) v Devonport 7.5 (47) – Devonport Oval (Sunday)
- Launceston 21.11 (137) v Sth Launceston 5.2 (32) – Windsor Park (Sunday)

=== Round 13 ===
(Saturday, 16 July 2011)

- Clarence 18.16 (124) v Nth Launceston 9.10 (64) – Bellerive Oval
- Nth Hobart 27.16 (178) v Devonport 7.9 (51) – North Hobart Oval
- Lauderdale 9.16 (70) v Hobart 10.9 (69) – TCA Ground
- Burnie 24.23 (167) v Sth Launceston 6.8 (44) – West Park Oval *
- Launceston 17.22 (124) v Glenorchy 3.5 (23) – Windsor Park

Note: Burnie Dockers wore the original Cooee Football Club uniform to honour its 1961 premiership anniversary.
Note: South Launceston wore the original City-South red and white playing uniform.

=== Round 14 ===
(Friday, 22 July. Saturday, 23 July & Sunday, 24 July 2011)

- Launceston 13.16 (94) v Nth Launceston 4.6 (30) – Aurora Stadium (Friday Night)
- Burnie 19.14 (128) v Hobart 11.3 (69) – TCA Ground
- Nth Hobart 21.17 (143) v Sth Launceston 12.7 (79) – Youngtown Memorial Ground
- Clarence 19.14 (128) v Devonport 11.7 (73) – Devonport Oval
- Lauderdale 18.17 (125) v Glenorchy 5.6 (36) – Lauderdale Sports Ground (Sunday)

=== Round 15 ===
(Saturday, 30 July & Saturday, 6 August 2011)

- Glenorchy 13.17 (95) v Clarence 14.7 (91) – KGV Football Park
- Launceston 21.10 (136) v Hobart 10.8 (68) – Windsor Park
- Burnie 15.15 (105) v Nth Launceston 6.2 (38) – West Park Oval
- Nth Hobart 12.7 (79) v Lauderdale 4.9 (33) – North Hobart Oval (6 August)
- Sth Launceston 17.18 (120) v Devonport 11.9 (75) – Youngtown Memorial Ground (6 August)

=== Round 16 ===
(Friday, 12 August & Saturday, 13 August 2011)

- Glenorchy 11.7 (73) v Nth Hobart 9.9 (63) – KGV Football Park (Friday Night)
- Clarence 20.15 (135) v Hobart 7.8 (50) – Bellerive Oval
- Lauderdale 12.13 (85) v Sth Launceston 5.4 (34) – Lauderdale Sports Ground
- Launceston 15.8 (98) v Burnie 6.18 (54) – Aurora Stadium
- Nth Launceston 15.20 (110) v Devonport 12.7 (79) – Devonport Oval

=== Round 17 ===
(Saturday, 20 August & Sunday, 21 August 2011)

- Clarence 13.10 (88) v Lauderdale 11.7 (73) – Bellerive Oval
- Glenorchy 17.9 (111) v Nth Launceston 12.9 (81) – Aurora Stadium
- Burnie 22.20 (152) v Devonport 4.6 (30) – West Park Oval
- Launceston 15.10 (100) v Sth Launceston 7.5 (47) – Youngtown Memorial Ground (Sunday) *
- Nth Hobart 27.17 (179) v Hobart 10.9 (69) – TCA Ground (Sunday)

Note: Brian Finch (Launceston) kicked his 100th goal during the 4th Quarter.

=== Round 18 ===
(Friday, 26 August & Saturday, 27 August 2011)

- Nth Launceston 18.12 (120) v Sth Launceston 11.9 (75) – Aurora Stadium (Friday Night)
- Burnie 11.10 (76) v Glenorchy 5.12 (42) – KGV Football Park
- Nth Hobart 13.17 (95) v Clarence 9.22 (76) – North Hobart Oval
- Hobart 17.7 (109) v Lauderdale 11.12 (78) – Lauderdale Sports Ground *
- Launceston 23.16 (154) v Devonport 2.8 (20) – Devonport Oval

Note: Lauderdale wore their original white and navy hooped Cats strip in honour of their sole 1991 premiership anniversary.

=== Qualifying Final ===
(Saturday, 3 September 2011)

- Burnie: 6.4 (40) | 10.6 (66) | 14.10 (94) | 20.15 (135)
- Clarence: 1.1 (7) | 5.6 (36) | 10.9 (69) | 12.12 (84)
- Attendance: N/A at Bellerive Oval

=== Elimination Final ===
(Sunday, 4 September 2011)

- Glenorchy: 3.2 (20) | 7.7 (49) | 12.13 (85) | 16.17 (113)
- Nth Hobart: 3.4 (22) | 5.8 (38) | 6.11 (47) | 9.15 (69)
- Attendance: 2,000 (approx) at North Hobart Oval

=== First Semi Final ===
(Saturday, 10 September 2011)

- Clarence: 4.3 (27) | 13.5 (83) | 16.8 (104) | 22.14 (146)
- Glenorchy: 6.5 (41) | 7.7 (49) | 10.10 (70) | 12.15 (87)
- Attendance: N/A at Bellerive Oval

=== Second Semi Final ===
(Saturday, 10 September 2011)

- Burnie: 3.1 (19) | 9.4 (58) | 13.5 (83) | 14.5 (89)
- Launceston: 4.4 (28) | 6.8 (44) | 7.10 (52) | 9.12 (66)
- Attendance: N/A at Aurora Stadium

=== Preliminary Final ===
(Friday, 16 September 2011)

- Launceston: 6.3 (39) | 8.9 (57) | 11.9 (75) | 13.15 (93)
- Clarence: 1.0 (6) | 3.5 (23) | 8.8 (56) | 8.10 (58)
- Attendance: N/A at Aurora Stadium (Friday Night)

=== Grand Final ===
(Saturday, 24 September 2011) (ABC1 highlights: 2011 TSL Grand Final)

- Launceston: 1.4 (10) | 5.5 (35) | 7.11 (53) | 12.14 (86)
- Burnie: 2.0 (12) | 2.4 (16) | 5.5 (35) | 6.6 (42)
- Attendance: 6,658 at Aurora Stadium
