= Robbie Fox =

Australian rules footballer (born 1993)

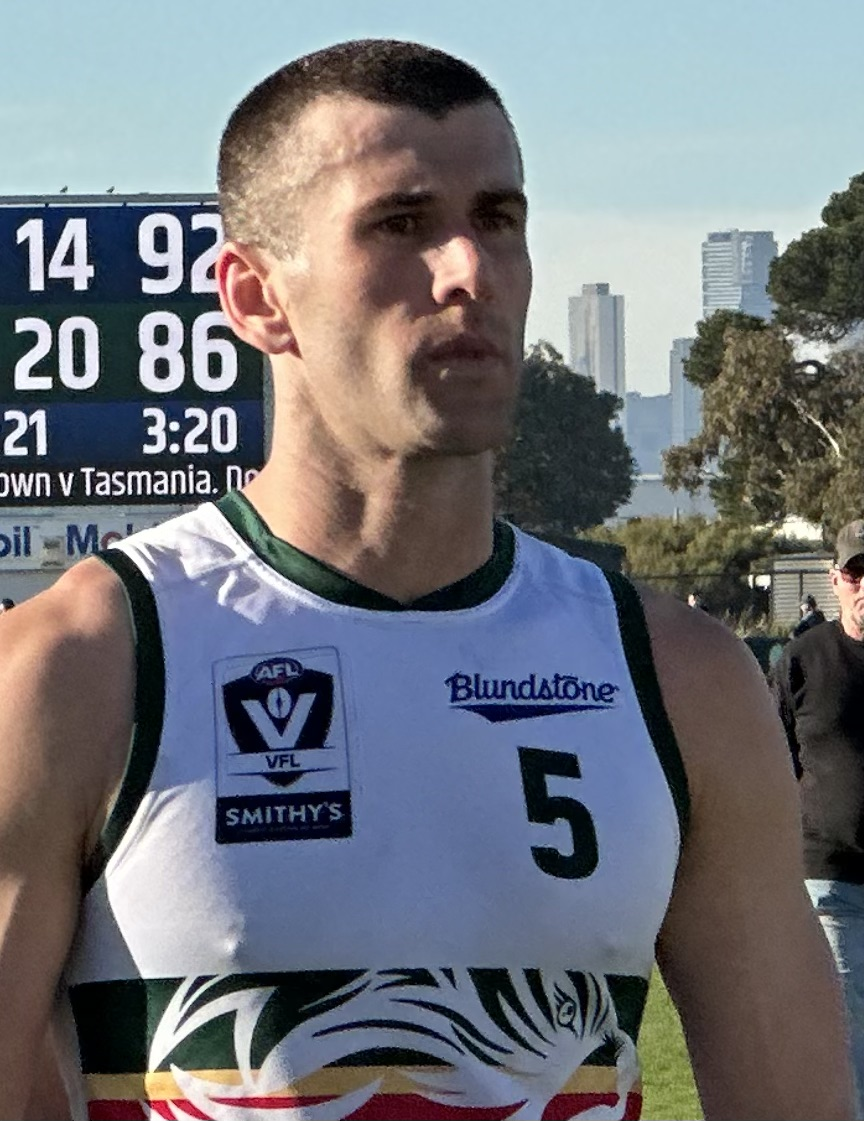
- Fox playing for Tasmania in 2026

Personal information
- Born: 16 April 1993 (age 33); Penguin, Tasmania
- Original teams: Burnie Dockers (TSL); Aberfeldie (EDFL); Coburg (VFL)
- Draft: No. 34, 2017 rookie draft
- Debut: Round 2, 2017, Sydney vs. Western Bulldogs, at Etihad Stadium
- Height: 185 cm (6 ft 1 in)
- Weight: 84 kg (185 lb)
- Position: Defender

Playing career
Years	Club	Games (Goals)
2017–2025	Sydney	105 (15)

Representative team honours
Years	Team	Games (Goals)
2012	TSL	1 (0)

Career highlights
- VFL Team of the Year: 2016; TSL premiership player: 2012

Robbie Fox (born 16 April 1993) is an Australian rules footballer who most recently served as the captain of the Tasmania Football Club in the Victorian Football League (VFL). He previously played professionally for the Sydney Swans in the Australian Football League (AFL).

== Early career ==
Originally from the Tasmanian north coast town of Penguin, Fox concentrated on playing basketball as a junior, making Tasmania's under-16 and under-16 state representative teams. He still played football his school, Marist Regional College, alongside close friend and future AFL player Brody Mihocek. Fox played for the Tassie Mariners in the 2011 AFL Under 18 Championships.

Fox made his senior debut for the Burnie Dockers in Tasmanian State League (TSL) at the age of 17 and played 46 matches for the club, including the 2012 premiership victory over Launceston. He also represented the TSL in an interstate representative match against the Victorian Football League (VFL) in May 2012, which the TSL lost by 108 points.

In early 2013, Fox moved from Penguin to Melbourne to study at La Trobe University. Although he had hoped to sign with the Northern Blues in the VFL, he instead joined the Aberfeldie Football Club in the Essendon District Football League (EDFL). He played for Aberfeldie in back-to-back Premier Division grand final losses in 2013 and 2014 and was named the club's most improved player for the 2014 season, in addition to being named in the best players on ten occasions throughout the season.

=== Coburg (2015–2016) ===
On 29 September 2014, Fox signed with the Coburg Football Club in VFL. After an injury-interrupted preseason, he made his senior VFL debut in round 2 of the 2015 season against Box Hill. Fox missed several matches due to injury, but returned in round 8 against the Northern Blues, kicking a goal in the late stages of the match to secure a two-point win. He finished fourth in Coburg's best-and-fairest count in 2015.

Following the departure of Coburg star Daniel Venditti, Fox primarily played for the club in the midfield during the 2016 season. Although he missed the end of the season due to injury, he was named on the wing in the 2016 VFL Team of the Year. He finished fifth in the club's best-and-fairest count and was named by The Terrace, Coburg's supporter group, as its player of the year.

== AFL career ==
=== Sydney (2017–2025) ===
Fox was selected by the Sydney Swans with the 34th overall pick of the 2017 rookie draft held on 27 November 2016. He made his Australian Football League (AFL) debut in round 2 of the 2017 season against the Western Bulldogs at Etihad Stadium.

After playing 14 games in 2020, Fox was delisted by Sydney, but was pre-listed as a rookie and remained at the club for the 2021 season. He played in Sydney's losing grand finals in 2022 and 2024. Fox was delisted by Sydney at the conclusion of the 2025 season.

== Post-AFL career ==
=== Tasmania (2026) ===
On 3 October 2025, the Tasmania Football Club announced Fox had joined the club for its inaugural VFL season, making him the second player to sign for Tasmania (after Jye Menzie). He was named Tasmania's inaugural men's captain on 18 February 2026. Fox sufferred a calf strain during the preseason, which meant he missed the club's inaugural match against Coburg at North Hobart Oval, before he eventually made his club debut in round 3 against Frankston. In round 19, Fox starred against Sydney with 32 disposals and ten marks in a 30-point victory. He was managed thorughout the season and played fourteen matches out of a possible twenty, with Menzie serving as acting captain when Fox was absence.

In October 2026, Tasmania announced that Fox would not be offerred a playing contract for the 2027 VFL season because of a "range of factors", including the club's "expectations regarding player behaviour and adherence to our standards". It was reported by ABC News that Fox had become "drunk and disorderly" at a pub in Hobart earlier in the month, including being "abusive toward some staff", with a bottle thrown and smashed during the incident. The club stated the decision for Fox to leave was not based on a single incident and he would remain employed as Tasmania's Strategic Projects and Impact Lead, having previously worked as the club's Commercial Partnership Coordinator.

== Statistics ==
Legend
G	Goals	K	Kicks	D	Disposals	T	Tackles
B	Behinds	H	Handballs	M	Marks

=== AFL ===
Season	Team	No.	Games	Totals							Averages (per game)							Votes
Season	Team	No.	Games	G	B	K	H	D	M	T	G	B	K	H	D	M	T	Votes
2017	Sydney	42	3	1	0	14	25	39	1	15	0.3	0.0	4.7	8.3	13.0	0.3	5.0	0
2018	Sydney	42	10	4	2	54	52	106	25	27	0.4	0.2	5.4	5.2	10.6	2.5	2.7	0
2019	Sydney	42	11	3	1	65	63	128	25	47	0.3	0.1	5.9	5.7	11.6	2.3	4.3	0
2020 (Note: The 2020 season was played with 17 home-and-away matches per team (down from 22) and 16-minute quarters with time on (down from 20-minute quarters with time on) due to the impact of the COVID-19 pandemic.)	Sydney	42	14	0	0	86	58	144	30	37	0.0	0.0	6.1	4.1	10.3	2.1	2.6	0
2021	Sydney	42	15	0	0	95	87	182	40	28	0.0	0.0	6.3	5.8	12.1	2.7	1.9	0
2022	Sydney	42	14	0	1	155	86	241	75	29	0.0	0.1	11.1	6.1	17.2	5.4	2.1	0
2023	Sydney	42	20	2	3	152	151	303	61	39	0.1	0.2	7.6	7.6	15.2	3.1	2.0	0
2024	Sydney	42	18	5	2	116	87	203	65	40	0.3	0.1	6.4	4.8	11.3	3.6	2.2	0
2025	Sydney	42	0	—	—	—	—	—	—	—	—	—	—	—	—	—	—	0
Career			105	15	9	737	609	1346	322	262	0.1	0.1	7.0	5.8	12.8	3.1	2.5	0

=== VFL ===
Season	Team	No.	Games	Totals							Averages (per game)							Votes
Season	Team	No.	Games	G	B	K	H	D	M	T	G	B	K	H	D	M	T	Votes
2015	Coburg	35	13															0
2016	Coburg	4	13															
2021	Sydney	42	1	0	0	14	16	30	7	5	0.0	0.0	14.0	16.0	30.0	7.0	5.0	— (Note: The J. J. Liston Trophy was not awarded in 2021 because the season was curtailed due to the impact of the COVID-19 pandemic.)
2022	Sydney	42	4	0	1	40	42	82	13	9	0.0	0.3	10.0	10.5	20.5	3.3	2.3	0
2023	Sydney	42	0	—	—	—	—	—	—	—	—	—	—	—	—	—	—	0
2024	Sydney	42	2	2	2	20	12	32	5	8	1.0	1.0	10.0	6.0	16.0	2.5	4.0	0
2025	Sydney	42	4	0	1	36	30	66	16	11	0.0	0.3	9.0	7.5	16.5	4.0	2.8	0
2026	Tasmania	5	14	3	1	138	141	279	62	39	0.2	0.1	9.9	10.1	19.9	4.4	2.8	5
Career			51															
