= Christopher Dell (cricketer) =

Australian cricketer

Personal information
- Full name: Christopher Ronald Dell
- Born: 27 October 1960 (age 66); Devonport, Tasmania, Australia
- Batting: Left-handed
- Bowling: Left-arm fast medium
- Role: bowler

Domestic team information
- Years: Team
- 1986: Tasmania

Career statistics
Competition	FC
Matches	1
Runs scored	4
Batting average	2.00
100s/50s	0/0
Top score	4
Balls bowled	42
Wickets	0
Bowling average	–
5 wickets in innings	–
10 wickets in match	–
Best bowling	–
Catches/stumpings	1/–
- Source: Cricinfo, 18 September 2009

Christopher Ronald Dell (born 27 October 1960) is a former Australian cricketer who played first-class cricket for Tasmania in the 1985-86 Sheffield Shield competition. He was a bowler who bowled left arm fast medium. He played for Devonport Cricket Club in the Tasmanian Grade Cricket competition.

He made his first-class debut against South Australia at the Adelaide Oval on 10 January 1986, as cover for the overseas professional, West Indian fast bowler Winston Davis who was out injured. Dell returned 0/40 off his six overs in the first innings, and did not seem to trouble any of the South Australian batsmen. His second innings figures of 0/33 off six overs were not much better, and the Tasmanian selectors concluded that he wasn't up to the quality required for Sheffield Shield cricket. He returned to play for his hometown side, Devonport, where he had a successful career as an all-rounder. For Devonport he scored 6194 runs at an average of 28.03 to become their second highest all-time run scorer, and also took 405 wickets at 19.11 to become their fourth highest ever wicket taker. Dell also took 111 catches for his club side.

Following his retirement from playing Christopher Dell took up a position as coach of Devonport Orions in his hometown.
