= Graham Fox =

Australian rules footballer

Personal information
- Full name: Graham Fox
- Born: 14 July 1957 (age 69)
- Original team: Glenorchy
- Height: 173 cm (5 ft 8 in)
- Weight: 73 kg (161 lb)
- Position: Midfielder

Playing career^{1}
Years	Club	Games (Goals)
1978	South Melbourne	3 (2)

Representative team honours
Years	Team	Games (Goals)
	Tasmania	6

Coaching career^{3}
Years	Club	Games (W–L–D)
2009–2011	Hobart	
- ^{1} Playing statistics correct to the end of 1978.^{3} Coaching statistics correct as of 2011.

Career highlights
- Winfield Statewide Cup Player of the Tournament; New Norfolk Premiership Player 1982; Hobart Premiership Player 1990; Tasmanian Football Hall of Fame Inductee

Graham Fox (born 14 July 1957) is a former Australian rules footballer who played with South Melbourne in the Victorian Football League (VFL). He is an inductee in the Tasmanian Football Hall of Fame.

== Career ==
=== South Melbourne ===
Fox was recruited to South Melbourne from Tasmania, where he played for the Glenorchy Football Club. In June 1977, while with Glenorchy, Fox represented the Tasmanian Football League against Victoria. Three months later he was signed by South Melbourne and joined the club for the 1978 VFL season. Used as a rover by South Melbourne, Fox debuted in round two, against Hawthorn at Lake Oval. He had 10 disposals and kicked two goals. A broken bone in his left hand then kept him on the sidelines and his second appearance at VFL level didn't come until round 13, when it was South Melbourne's turn to meet Hawthorn away, at Princes Park. He was dropped after that weekend and played just once more for South Melbourne, against Melbourne at the Melbourne Cricket Ground in round 21.

=== Tasmania ===
Back in Tasmania, Fox had a noted career with several clubs, an estimated tally of 265 games. In addition to approximately 80 games for Glenorchy, he made around 85 appearances for New Norfolk and 100 for Hobart. A six-time Tasmanian interstate representative, Fox was player of the tournament at the 1980 Winfield Statewide Cup and won two premierships, the first with New Norfolk in 1982 and the other at Hobart in 1990.

Fox took over from Todd Lewis as coach of Hobart midway through the 2009 TSL season and remained senior coach until the end of the 2011 TSL season. Unable to take Hobart into the finals, Fox resigned as coach and was replaced by Anthony McConnon.

He has also coached Claremont (Tasmania) and Kingston.

In 2011, Fox was inducted into the Tasmanian Football Hall of Fame.
