= Devonport Cricket Club =

- Nickname(s): Orions
- League: Cricket North West (CNW)
- Association: Tasmanian Cricket Association (TCA)

Personnel
- Captain: Miles Barnard
- Coach: Stephen Lee
- Chairman: Stephen Casey

Team information
- City: Devonport, Tasmania
- Colours: Navy blue White
- Founded: 1951
- Home ground: Devonport Oval, Devonport
- Capacity: 14,000

History
- No. of titles: 13 (1956/57, 1966/67, 1967/68, 1975/76, 1979/80, 1980/81, 1984/85, 1985/86, 1993/94, 1997/98, 2000/01, 2003/04, 2014/15)
- Official website: Club website

Devonport Cricket Club commonly known as Devonport Orions, or simply Devonport, is an Australian amateur cricket club based in Devonport, Tasmania. Devonport Cricket Club represents the third largest city in the state of Tasmania by population. The club has many teams which represent it, some of which include: First grade men, second grade men, under 16 boys, under 12’s, First grade women, under 17 girls, second grade women and many more.

== Honours ==
CNW Premierships: 13; 1956/57, 1966/67, 1967/68, 1975/76, 1979/80, 1980/81, 1984/85, 1985/86, 1993/94, 1997/98, 2000/01, 2003/04, 2014/15

== See also ==
- Cricket Tasmania
