= Hobart City Football Club =

Demons

Names
- Full name: Hobart City Demons (North Hobart Football Club Ltd)
- Nickname(s): The Demons

2017 (TSL) season
- After finals: 6th
- Leading goalkicker: Josh Williamson 35
- Best and fairest: Ryan Matthews

Club details
- Founded: 2013; 12 years ago (NHFC: 1881)
- Dissolved: 2017; Reversion to North Hobart
- Colours
- Competition: Tasmanian State League
- President: Michael Denehey
- Coach: Kane Richter
- Captain(s): Hugh Williams
- Ground(s): North Hobart Oval (capacity: 18,000)

Uniforms
Home

The Hobart City Football Club (trading name: Hobart City Demons) was an Australian rules football club which competed in the Tasmanian State Football League (TSL) from 2014 to 2017 and were based in Hobart, Tasmania.

== History ==
Hobart City was established as a football club in December 2013, in preparation for entrance in the Tasmanian State League for the 2014 season. The club was formed to provide a pathway for the junior clubs within the CBD boundaries. Ex North Hobart Football Club President Bruce Free accepted a 50% ownership with the Hobart Football Club, however Hobart withdrew and AFL Tasmania took the other 50% ownership. The North Hobart Football Club has since obtained 100% ownership. The most significant change is the North Hobart Football Club will change from an incorporated body and become a company limited by guarantee with a new constitution and board structure.

North Hobart's 2013 captain Hugh Williams was given the captaincy for Hobart City and former North Hobart assistant coach Michael McGregor was announced as the inaugural coach. The team has an overall playing list of over 60 players, ensuring representation in the State and Development leagues. Unlike other clubs in Australian rules football, Hobart City FC elected not to adopt a nickname upon inception. It was not until July 2014, halfway through its first season, that the club announced it would be known as the "Hobart City Demons" as their trading name.

On October 9, 2017, the paying members of the Hobart City Demons voted 371-118 (76%-24%) in favour of returning the playing name of the club to the traditional North Hobart identity for season 2018 and beyond.

== Guernsey ==
The club guernsey was modelled on the Melbourne Football Club away strip, featuring the v-shape design in the colours of predominantly white, red and blue.

== Home ground ==
The club played nearly all its home games at the North Hobart Oval. The Queenborough Oval in the Hobart suburb of Sandy Bay occasionally hosted one game a season.

== Club results ==
Season	Win–loss	Finishing position	Captain(s)	Club best & fairest	Leading goalkicker
2014	7-11	7th	Hugh Williams	Gareth Delaney	Julian Dobosz 40
2015	9-9	6th	Hugh Williams	Hugh Williams	Julian Dobosz 51
2016	6-11-1	6th	Hugh Williams	Ryan Matthews	Josh Williamson 32
2017	9-9	6th	Hugh Williams	Ryan Matthews	Josh Williamson 35
