= Devonport Oval =

Sports stadium in Tasmania

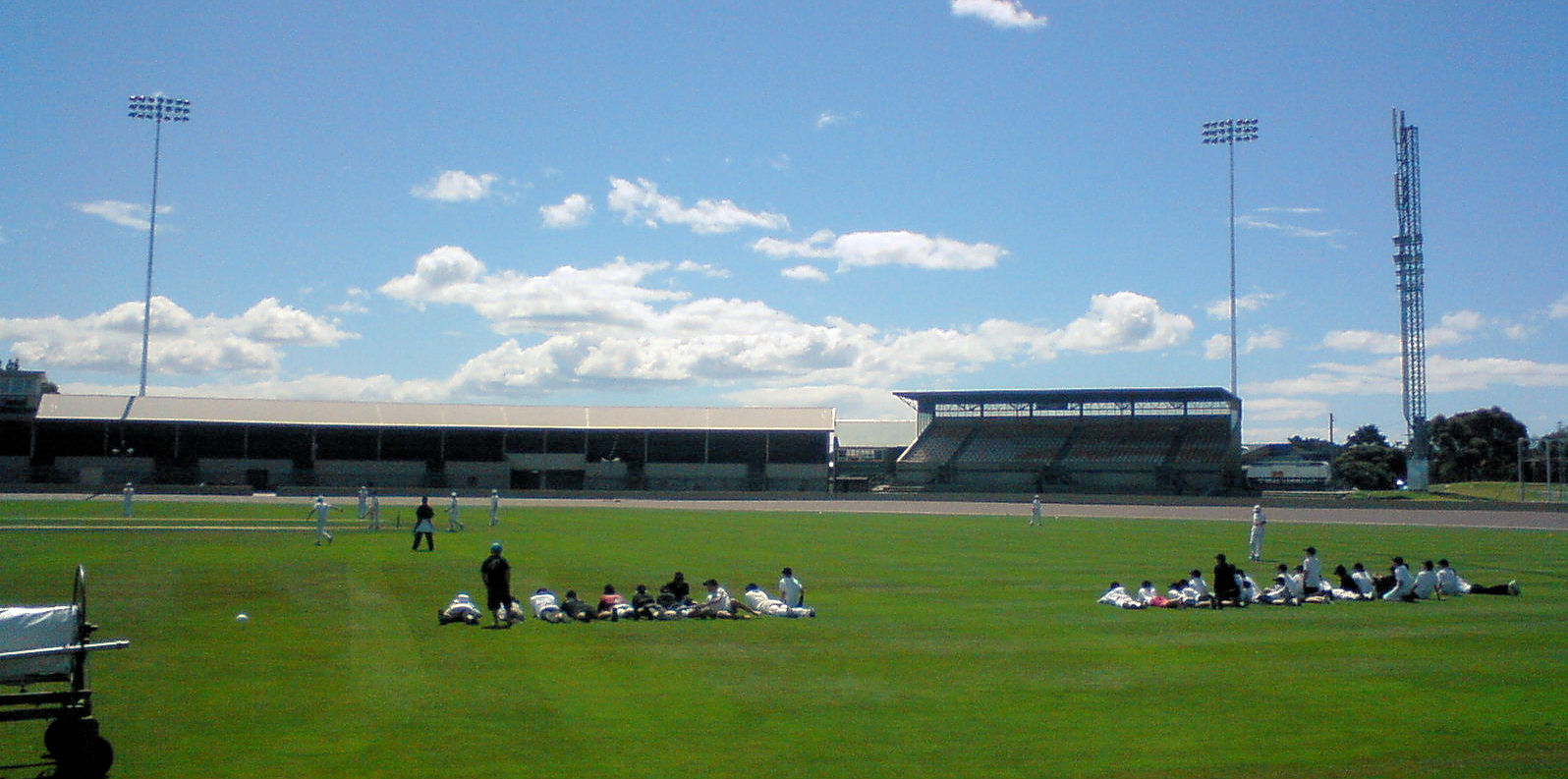
- Interactive map of Devonport Oval
- Location: Devonport, Tasmania
- Coordinates: 41°10′1″S 146°21′32″E
- Owner: Devonport City Council
- Operator: Devonport City Council
- Capacity: 10,000
- Surface: Grass

Construction
- Opened: c. 1937

Tenants
- Devonport Football Club (TSL & NWFL); Devonport Cricket Club; Tasmania Devils (VFL) (2001-2005); Hawthorn Football Club (AFL) (2022)

Ground information
- End names
- Bass Strait End; Southern End

International information
- Only men's ODI: 3 February 1987: England v West Indies
- As of 8 January 2016; Source: Cricinfo

Devonport Oval is an Australian rules football, cricket and athletics stadium in Devonport, Tasmania. It is the home stadium for the Devonport Football Club in the Tasmanian State League (TSL) and for the Devonport Cricket Club in the NWTCA competition. The oval also hosts the Devonport Athletics & Cycling Carnival each year and regularly attracts interstate competitors. The stadium has a capacity of 13,000 people, and underwent upgrades for increased lighting to be used for night football matches in the TSL in 2009.

== History ==
The Devonport Oval is positioned next to Mersey Bluff in Devonport overlooking Bass Strait.

The stadium has two stands, the Frank Matthews Stand, which is a long wooden Main Stand on the wing, and a newer concrete stand with bucket seats in the pocket, as well as a pavilion and a grass hill. The ground is tiered on one side.

After the Devonport City Council's decision to upgrade the unused Devonport Oval in 1937, a Victorian Football League practice match was played there between Collingwood and Geelong, and the redevelopment was a winner for the fans, with a crowd of more than 10,000 attending. In 1959, Devonport's population was just under 14,000 people, in that same year an interstate Australian football match between Tasmania and Victoria was played there and the attendance was 13,500; three years later, an interstate match between Tasmania and the Victorian Football Association drew 20,000 spectators.

The Devonport Oval hosted one One Day International cricket match in the 1986–87 season between England and the West Indies. It also hosted many Tasmanian Sheffield Shield cricket matches and domestic one-day matches for Tasmania. The ground also hosted two Tasmanian State Grand Finals and six TFL Statewide League finals between 1988 and 2000 and hosted the North West Football Union Grand Final on several occasions.

In 2012, there was discussion of selling the Devonport Oval, along with the East Devonport Oval and two other local recreation facilities, to fund a new sporting precinct in Devonport.

In 2024, it was announced that the facility would be redeveloped into a broader sporting precinct, to be known as the Devonport Oval Sports Complex. The project includes the addition of outdoor courts and a new structure on the eastern side of the oval, which will house multi-purpose indoor courts (for sports such as basketball and netball). The redevelopment will also provide improved spaces for community events, administration, and training. The development, costing $60 million, is jointly funded by the federal, state, and local governments.
