= Windsor Park, Tasmania =

Sports venue in Tasmania, Australia

Windsor Park
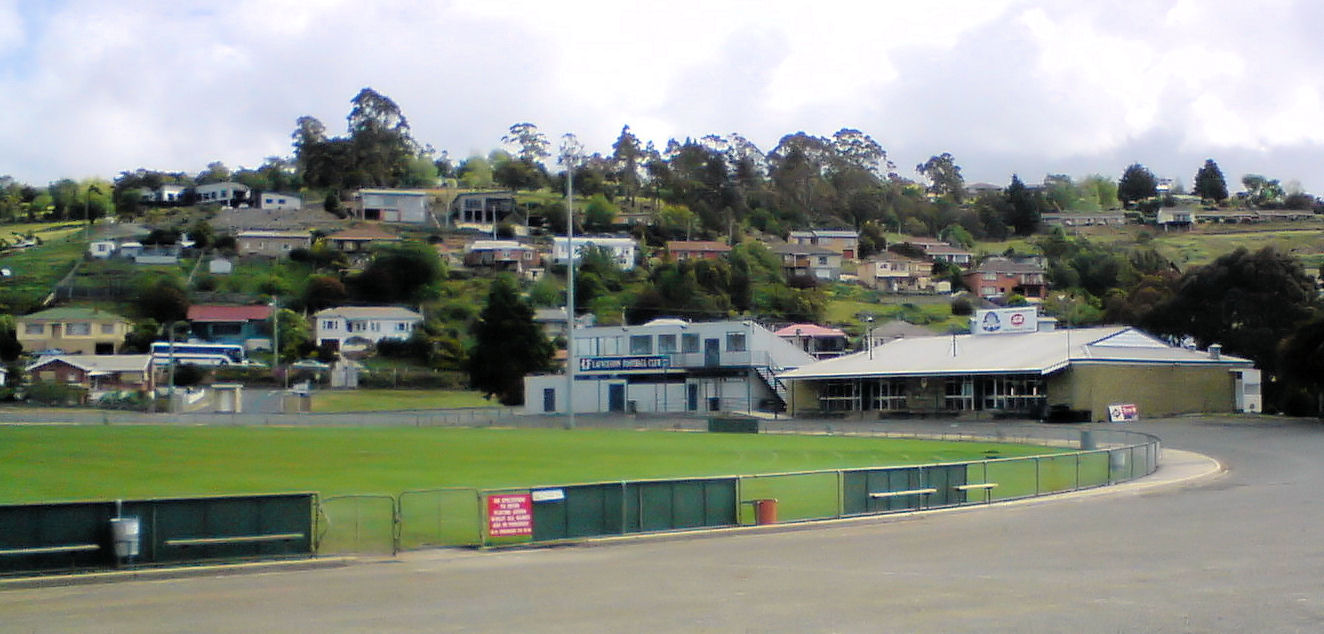
- Interactive map of Windsor Park
- Location: Launceston, Tasmania
- Coordinates: 41°24′12″S 147°05′30″E
- Owner: West Tamar Council
- Operator: West Tamar Council
- Capacity: 2,000
- Surface: Grass

Construction
- Opened: 1968

Tenant
- Launceston Football Club (TSL)

Windsor Park is an Australian Rules football ground that is home to the Launceston Football Club and has been since 1968 when the club was a member of the former NTFA competition. It is currently a venue in the Tasmanian State League. The grounds do not have established grandstands, but has had portable grandstand seating erected since Launceston joined the TSL competition, it also has a social clubroom building and a two-storey change room and viewing area beside it which was severely damaged by fire in 2007. The Windsor Park area includes Australian Rules Football, Cricket and Soccer grounds and is located by the banks of the Tamar River in the suburb of Riverside, Launceston, Australia. The various sporting grounds in the precinct are home of the Launceston Football Club in the Tasmania State League, Riverside Cricket Club and Riverside Olympic, a football (soccer) club which represents Launceston in the Tasmanian Northern Premier League
