= Lauderdale Football Club =

Lauderdale Bombers

Names
- Full name: Lauderdale Football Club
- Nickname: Bombers
- Former nickname(s): Cats (1981-2003) & Magpies (1979-1980)
- Club song: "See the Bombers Fly Up!"

2025 season
- After finals: 2nd
- Home-and-away season: 1st from 6
- Leading goalkicker: Sam Siggins (74)
- Best and fairest: (N/A)

Club details
- Founded: 1979; 47 years ago
- Colours
- Competition: SFL Premier League
- President: Andrew Lyden
- Coach: Brent Dolliver
- Captain(s): Sam Siggins & Phil Bellchambers
- Premierships: 1 (1991) Tasmanian Amateur Football League (Southern Division)
- Ground: Lauderdale Oval (capacity: 2,500)

Uniforms
Home

Other information
- Official website: lfsc.org.au

Lauderdale Football Club is an Australian rules football club based in the Hobart, beachside suburb of Lauderdale.

== History ==
The Lauderdale Football Club was formed in 1979 and were known as the Lauderdale Magpies, competing in the Tasman Football Association for two seasons.

In 1981, the club changed their emblem and uniform to the Cats and joined the Tasmanian Amateur Football League (Southern Division) where they remained until that competition collapsed after the 1995 season.

Lauderdale joined the new Southern Tasmanian Football League (now known as the SFL) in 1996, it remained as the Cats until December 2003 when Australian Football League team Essendon Bombers aligned with Lauderdale, changing the club's name to the Lauderdale Bombers.

The club was a founding member of the Southern Tasmanian Football League in 1996 after previously being a member of the Tasman Football Association (1979–80) and Tasmanian Amateur Football League (Southern Division) from 1981-1995.

The club won their only senior premiership title in the 1991 TAFL (Southern Division) Grand Final over Claremont at Abbotsfield Park and were runners up (to Claremont) at the same venue in 1993.

The Southern Tasmanian Football League changed its name in 1998 to the Southern Football League.

In the years between 1996 and 2001, Lauderdale had little success and struggled with a success rate of just 30.2%.

In 2002, the league was split into two divisions and Lauderdale was placed into the Regional League.

The club finally had some success, making the Grand Final in both 2002 and 2003.

Although beaten by Cygnet in both of the club's Grand Final appearances it was parachuted into joining the SFL Premier League to replace Sorell Football Club, who went into recess prior to the 2003 season and rejoined the competition the following year, this time in the Regional League.

The Essendon alignment coincided with the clubs entry into the Southern Football League's Premier League and the club started the 2004 season as the Lauderdale Bombers.

After disappointing campaigns in 2004, 2005 and 2006 the Bombers finally started to make inroads into the competition in 2007, missing the final five by only 12% from Hobart and collected some impressive scalps along the way, beating both Clarence and North Hobart during the roster season and finished fourth in 2008 finals series.

In 2009 the club joined the new Tasmanian State League and were a highly competitive outfit for much of the competition's sixteen year stint, making Grand Final appearances on four occasions between 2017 and 2024, however they were unable to capture a premiership title in that time.

After the axing of the Tasmanian State League following the 2024 season, the Bombers rejoined the Southern Football League (Tasmania) from the start of the 2025 season as a member of the SFL Premier League.

== Identity ==
=== Guernsey and colours ===
The Lauderdale Football Club were originally known as the Cats and wore a blue and white hooped jumper until becoming the Bombers in 2004. The current clash jumper is a homage to the clubs historical colours and moniker.

==== Uniform evolution ====
Lauderdale; Cats (1981-2003)	Lauderdale; Bombers (2004-2010)	Lauderdale; Bombers (current)

=== Club song ===
The Club's theme song is the same as Essendon's theme song and is named "See the Bombers Fly Up" and is based on the tune of Johnnie Hamp's 1929 song "Keep Your Sunny Side Up" at an increased tempo. The lyrics are as follows:

See the Bombers fly up, up!
To win the premiership flag.
Our boys who play this grand old game,
Are always striving for glory and fame!
See the Bombers fly up, up,
The other teams they don't fear,
They all try their best,
But they can't get near,
As the Bombers fly up!

== Club Records ==
Southern Football League – Premiers

- 2026

Southern Football League – Runner-Up

- 2002, 2003, 2025

Tasmanian State League – Premiers

- Nil

Tasmanian State League – Runner-Up

- 2017, 2018, 2019, 2024

Tasmanian Amateur FL – Premiers

- 1991

Tasmanian Amateur FL – Runner-Up

- 1993

Alistair Lynch Medalists: (TSL)

- 2020, 2022 & 2023 - Sam Siggins

TSL Media Player of the Year:

- 2022 & 2023 - Sam Siggins

Walter Howard Medalists: (TAFL)

- 1994 – Leigh Franklin

Lefroy Medalist (BOG in a State Game):

- 2023 - Sam Siggins (Tasmania V Queensland)

Peter Hodgman Medalists: SFL Regional

- 2002 – Brad Marsland

Club Record Games Holder:

- Matthew Coulson – 464 games

Club Record Attendance:

- Not available

Club Record Score:

- Not Available

== The club ==
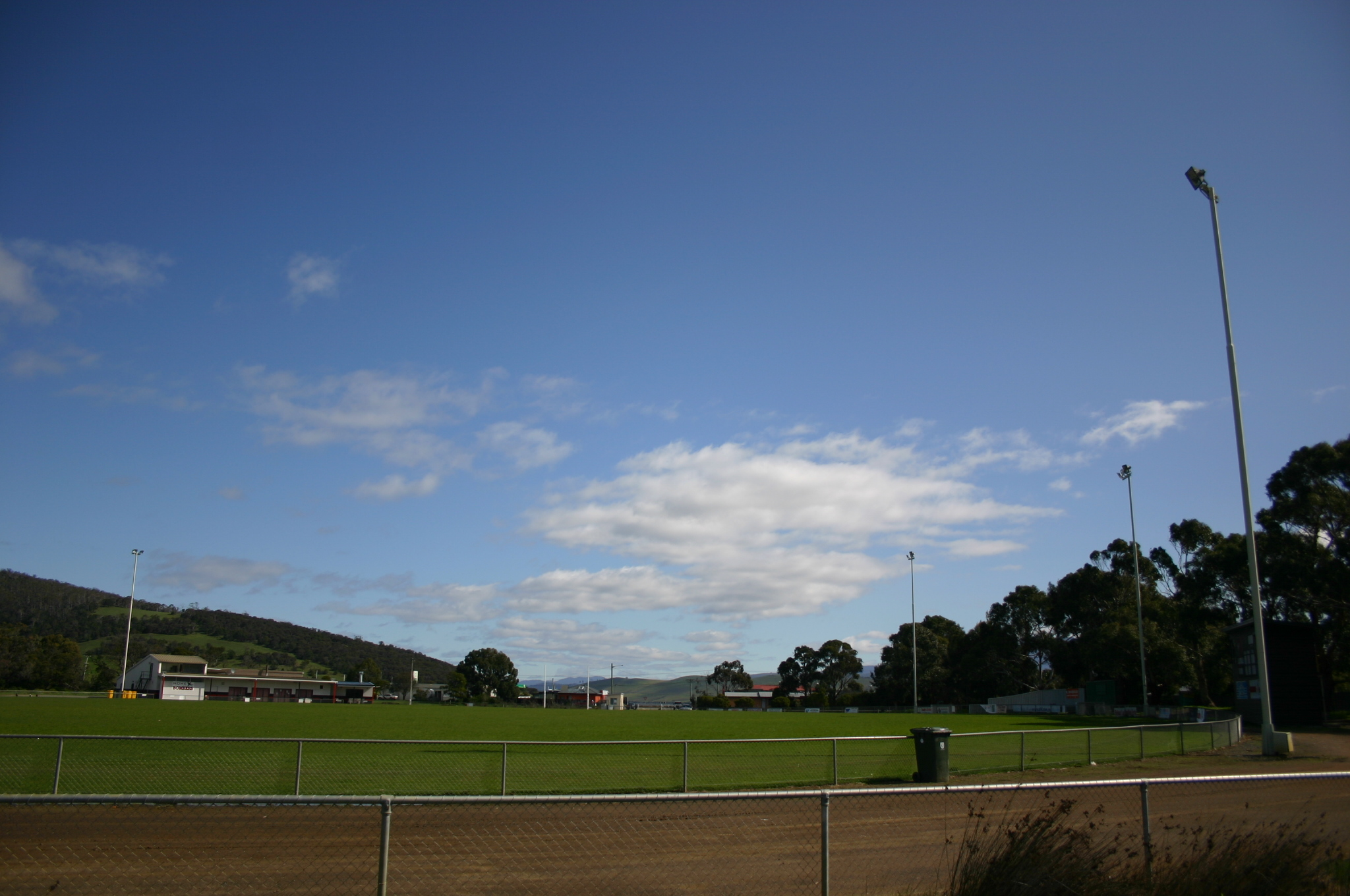
Lauderdale Oval

Home ground:

- Lauderdale Oval – 1979–present

Colours:

- Red and black (formerly navy blue and white)

Emblem:

Bombers (Formerly Cats, Magpies)

== Notable former/current player ==
- Hugh Greenwood (Adelaide, Gold Coast, and North Melbourne footballer)
- Mitch Robinson (Carlton and Brisbane footballer)
- Jacob Gillbee (Gold Coast footballer)
- Andrew Phillips (GWS, Carlton, and Essendon footballer)
- Allen Christensen (Geelong and Brisbane footballer)
- Josh McGuiness (Brisbane footballer)
