= 1939 TANFL season =

58th season of the Tasmanian Australian National Football League

- Teams: 4
- Premiers: North Hobart; 13th premiership
- Minor premiers: North Hobart
- Best and fairest: Eric Zschech (Lefroy)
- Leading goalkicker: Jack Metherell (North Hobart − 59 goals)

The 1939 TANFL season was the 58th season of the Tasmanian Australian National Football League (TANFL), the highest-level senior Australian rules football competition in southern Tasmania.

North Hobart won the TSL premiership for the 13th time and the second year in a row, defeating Cananore by 22 points in the final.

== Ladder ==
Pos	Team	Pld	W	L	D	Pts	Qualification
1	North Hobart (P)	15	12	3	0	60	Finals series
2	Cananore	15	8	7	0	36	Finals series
3	Lefroy	15	6	9	0	28	Finals series
4	New Town	15	4	11	0	20	

Rules for classification: 1) points; 2) percentage; 3) number of points for.
(P) Premiers

== Finals ==
From 1929 until 1941, the TANFL home-and-away season featured three rounds played for 4 premiership points per win, and two rounds played for 6 premiership points per win. A three-team system with challenge was then played, with the initial 1–3 positions based on premiership points, and the right of challenge going only to the team with the strictly best home-and-away season win-loss record.

=== Semi-final ===
	Semi-final
Saturday, 2 September	Cananore 10.7 (67)	def.	Lefroy 9.7 (61)	North Hobart Oval (crowd: 3,484)
Cananore 10.6 (66) led Lefroy 2.3 (15) at half time by 51 points; Cananore managed only one point after half time, but Lefroy was unable to make up the difference and Cananore won by six points.

=== Grand final ===
1939 TANFL grand final
Saturday, 16 September	North Hobart	def.	Cananore	North Hobart Oval (crowd: 5,078)
2.1 (13); 4.6 (30); 7.8 (50); 10.9 (69)	Q1; Q2; Q3; Final	3.2 (20); 5.5 (35); 6.7 (43); 6.11 (47)
T. Richardson 3, Tyler 2, S. Richardson, Jones, Manson, Pratt, Andrews	Goals	Cashman, Haley, E. Richardson, Harrison, Clothier, Reid
Pye, Hooper, Goggins, Abbott, Pratt, T. Richardson, Metherell	Best	Evans, Cashman, Haley, Harrison, Reid, Clothier, E. Richardson
Had Cananore won, North Hobart (which had the best win-loss record) would have been entitled under the challenge rule to a rematch the following Saturday to decide the premiership.

== Awards ==
- Eric Zschech (Lefroy) won the George Watt memorial medal as the TANFL's best and fairest player. It was Zschech's second league best and fairest award, having first won it in 1936.
- Jack Metherell (North Hobart) was the TANFL's leading goalkicker, finishing the home-and-away season with 59 goals.
- North Hobart won the Tasmanian State Premiership for the sixth time, defeating City (NTFA) on 23 September 1939 at North Hobart Oval, before an attendance of 5,800. North Hobart 13.13 (91) defeated City 12.13 (85)
