= Ted Terry =

Australian rules footballer (1904–1967)

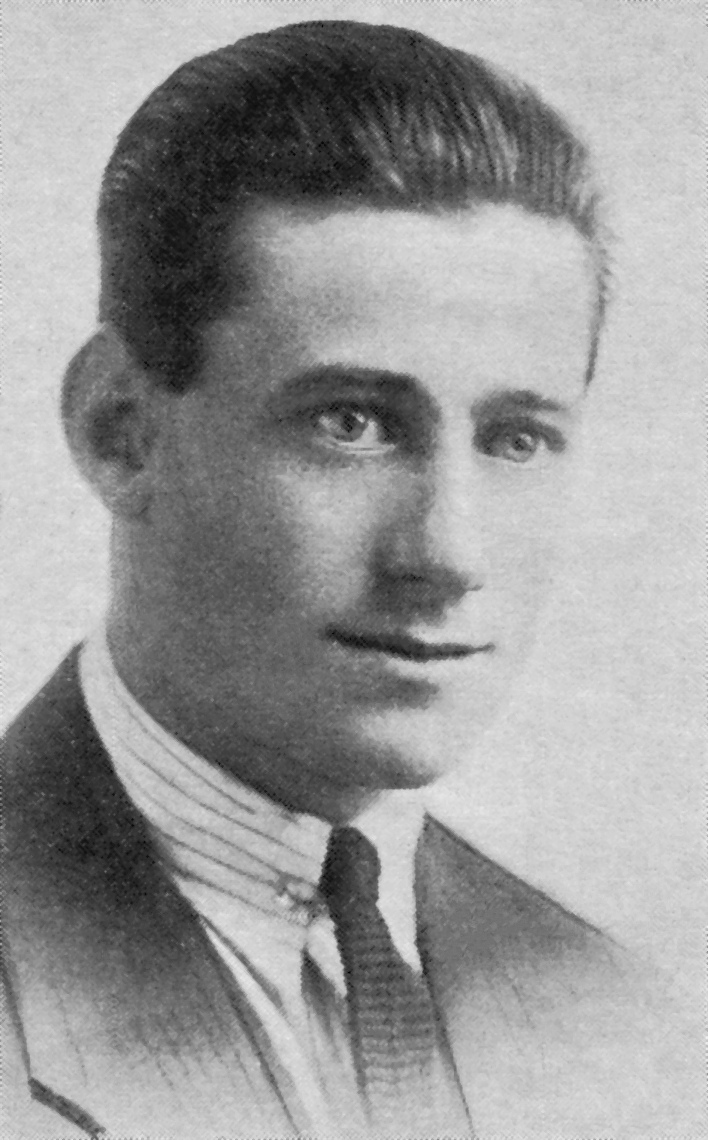
- Terry pictured in 1922

Personal information
- Full name: Edward Richard Terry
- Born: 4 June 1904; Launceston, Tasmania
- Died: 5 March 1967 (aged 62); Launceston, Tasmania
- Original team: Cananore / Southern United
- Debut: Round 3, 11 May 1929, St Kilda vs. Geelong, at Junction Oval

Playing career^{1}
Years	Club	Games (Goals)
1929	St Kilda	1 (0)
- ^{1} Playing statistics correct to the end of 1929.

Edward Richard Terry (4 June 1904 – 5 March 1967) was an outstanding all-round Tasmanian schoolboy athlete.

He was an accomplished professional sprinter, and he also played Australian rules football in Tasmania before moving to the mainland and playing with St Kilda in the VFL, and with Prahran in the Victorian Football Association.

== Early life ==
Edward Richard "Ted" Terry ("Young Ted") was born in Launceston, Tasmania on 4 June 1904, the son of Edward "Ted" Terry ("Old Ted") (1872–1954) and Honorine Cousel (1878–1964). He was, also, the nephew of Ernest Richard "Mick" Terry. He spent his early formative years in Scottsdale and parts of northeastern Tasmania. He had one brother, John, and two sisters, Madge and May.

He married Kathleen Melva Westbrook (1903–1991) in 1929. They had a daughter, Frances Jill Terry (1931–2025).

=== Richard Terry ===
Ted's grandfather, Richard Terry (1833–1909), was born in Middlesex, England. He landed in Melbourne in 1852, and in October 1852 sailed to north-eastern of Tasmania, and settled at "Terry Vale" on the banks of the Powers Rivulet, near present-day Goshen, Tasmania, in North-Eastern Tasmania. In 1854, hearing of the discovery of some very rich farming land in the region of today's Pyengana, he moved there. He "selected" 320 acres (130 hectares) of the very best land, and continued to farm it until his death. He was also the proprietor of the Columba Hotel, the only hotel offering accommodation in the district. In 1864, he married Celia Terry (née Rosier) (1843–1925), who was born in Avoca, Tasmania.

=== "Old Ted" Terry ===
Ted's father, Edward "Ted" Terry, born in Pyengana, North-Eastern Tasmania on 21 August 1872, was one of the eleven sons and four daughters of Richard and Celia Terry. "Old Ted" owned the Ascot Hotel, near Branxholm, North-Eastern Tasmania; and, at various times, owned each of the three hotels at Derby, North-Eastern Tasmania. Two of "Old Ted’s" brothers also kept hotels: Alfred (1865–1937), the Commercial Hotel, at Ringarooma, Northern Tasmania, and John (1870–1936), the Scottsdale Hotel, at Scottsdale, North-Eastern Tasmania.

"Old Ted" also owned a timber mill in Derby, North-Eastern Tasmania. "Young Ted's" brother John worked at the timber mill; and "Young Ted" also worked for his father at the timber mill for some time both immediately before and immediately after World War II. "Old Ted" died, in Derby, on 12 May 1954.

=== Uncle "Mick" Terry ===
Ted's uncle, Ernest Richard "Mick" Terry, was born in Pyengana on 17 August 1881. In his prime as an athlete, "Mick" Terry was not only a fine sprinter and middle-distance runner, he was also the champion axeman of the Australian Commonwealth, and he held a number of world records for the 12-in, 15-in, and 18-in standing blocks. He often competed very successfully in private handicap woodchopping contests.

He later became an athletics coach. He moved to South Africa in 1909, as the coach of "The Blue Streak" Jack Donaldson, He was short-listed to coach the German team in the 1916 Summer Olympics; however, the 1916 Olympic Games were later cancelled due to World War I. He was the coach of the South African Olympic Athletic Teams in 1924 and 1928. He was an athletics coach for the Australian Olympic Athletic Team in 1932. He died in Durban, Natal, South Africa on 7 July 1964.

== Schoolboy athlete ==
Ted Terry attended St Virgil's College, a Christian Brothers' college, in Barrack Street, Hobart; and, whilst there, was an outstanding all-round schoolboy athlete. He excelled at track and field athletics, cricket, football, tennis, swimming, gymnastics, rowing, and handball.

=== Handball ===
Given that St. Virgil's was Christian Brothers' college, handball was very strongly promoted amongst the students, driven by the Brothers' view that handball "affords an excellent preparatory training for football, as it calls into play all the resources of the physical man". Handball is one of the best ways for a potential Australian Rules footballer to acquire the optimum level of hand–eye coordination, ambidexterity, smoothness and flexibility, and sense of where one is in time and space (e.g., Bill Serong who played in three Grand Finals for Collingwood, went to the Christian Brothers' College in Victoria Parade, and was the Australian handball champion in 1974, aged 38).

Terry became the school's handball champion, and won the college's handball championship's gold medal in 1921.

=== Tennis ===
On Saturday, 19 November 1921, playing for St. Virgil's College against Hutchins School, Terry lost his only singles match, but won his two doubles matches (those two wins were the only wins for St. Vigil's on that day). On Saturday 15 April 1922, Terry was beaten in the final of the Associated Schools Tennis Singles' Championship.

=== Swimming ===
At the 1919 Southern Tasmanian Secondary Schools' Annual Swimming Carnival, he came third in the under-15 50 yards freestyle. In 1922 he was St. Virgil's open-age swimming champion.

=== Cricket ===
He was the first St Virgil's batsman to score a century, which he did in 34 minutes against the attack of Arthur Owen Burrows (1903–1984) – who would later bowl in tandem with Laurie Nash for Tasmania – and Alan Bispham "Block" Brownell (1904–1981), two of the best bowlers that Tasmania has ever produced; and, in his last year at St Virgil's, he topped the school's batting and bowling averages.

=== Rowing ===
He was stroke of the school's crew in the Head of the River (this would usually indicate that he was the best oarsman); and, in October 1921, he weighed 10 st 13 lbs (69.5 kg).

=== Athletics ===
Over the years he regularly competed for St Virgil's in the 100 yards sprint, 220 yards sprint, 440, 880, and mile races as well as the 130 yards hurdles and the high jump.

==== 1919 ====
At the 1919 St. Virgil's College sports day, held on Thursday 20 March 1919, he won the open mile (at the age of 14), the under-15 100 yards, 220 yards, 440 yards, and high jump (he jumped 4 ft 7in).

At the 1919 Hobart Associated Secondary Schools' Athletics Carnival, held on Tuesday, 8 April 1919, competing for St. Virgil's, he ran equal third in the under-15 100 yards, second (by inches only) in the under-15 220 yards, second in the under-15 440 yards, and also came second in the under-15 high jump (jumping 4 ft 4in).

The 1919 Tasmanian Associated Schools' Athletics Carnival had seven schools competing: four from the south (St. Virgil's, Hutchins, Friends', and Leslie House School), and three from the north (Scotch, St Patrick's, and Church Grammar School). Running for St. Virgil's, Ted Terry ran fourth in the under-15 100 yards, second in the under-15 220 yards, and second in the under-15 440 yards, as well as coming sixth in the under-15 high jump.

==== 1920 ====
At the St. Virgil's sports day, held on Thursday, 25 March 1920, three months before he turned 16, he won the open 100 yards, came second in the open 220 yards, second in the open 880 yards, and third in the open mile.

==== 1921 ====
At the 1921 Southern Tasmanian Associated Schools' Athletics Carnival, he won every race he entered, from 100 yards to the mile; he won the senior 100 yards, 220 yards, 440 yards, 880 yards, and mile, as well as the 120 yards hurdles; "he had a great reception, and was carried shoulder high to the pavilion by his school mates".

Despite Terry's outstanding individual success, St. Virgil's did not win the carnival; and, as a consequence, he was not permitted to compete at the Tasmanian State Secondary School Championships, because it was set up to be a competition between the best southern and the best northern school, rather than between the best southern athletes and the best northern athletes.

==== 1922 T.A.A.A. Track Championships ====
On 1 April 1922, Terry took part in the Tasmanian Amateur Athletics Association's Annual Track Championships that were held at the Cricket Ground. The Tasmanian championships that year were especially significant due to the presence of a South African team, which included a number of eminent South African sprinters, including 1920 Olympic silver medallist in the 4x400 relay, J.K.A. Oosterlaak, J.W. Bukes and H.P. Kinsman (who would later represent South Africa at the 1924 Olympics and the 1928 Olympics). Kinsman did not compete in the championships due to injury.

Terry won the Secondary Schools' 100 Yards championship (by 3 yards in 10.6 secs), won the 200 yards Cadet Championship (by 5 yards in 25 secs) and, running off scratch, came second in the Secondary Schools' 440 Yards' Handicap, by 4 yards, having given a 20-yard start to the winner.

Then, Terry went on and proved his worth as a sprinter, running against grown men in the senior 100 yards championship, when he ran second in his heat, 2 yards behind Oosterlaak, who won in 10.4 secs.

In a thrilling final, Bukes led from the start and drew away, with Oosterlaak, the favourite, coming back at the finish and appearing to catch Bukes on the line. Terry, by far the best Tasmanian, finished third, just four yards away, in a very fast race; Bukes had won by inches, in a time of 10 secs – an open Tasmanian record. The anticipation of the crowd, waiting to see if the runners could be separated by the judges, was transformed into even greater excitement when the course announcer publicly declared that it was not a dead-heat, but then also (mistakenly) declared Oosterlaak the winner; and, then, immediately had to announce that he was mistaken, and that Bukes had indeed won.

Noting that Terry had been greatly overworked at the championships, and had attempted far too much at such a meeting for such a young man, The Mercury's athletics correspondent asserted that "If I am any judge, I think Terry the best prospect in Tasmania" and, obviously aware of his family's connexions with professional foot-running, expressed a fervent hope that he would not be lost to the professionals.

==== 1922 S.T.A.S. Athletics Carnival ====
"E. Terry, of St Virgil's, was the best all-round athlete I remember, but, unfortunately, he drifted to the professional ranks. Terry in 1922 recorded a wonderful performance in winning the 100 yards in 10 3-5sec., 220 yards in 24 1-5sec, 440 yards in 56 3-5 sec., 880 yards in 2min. 14sec, and was second in the 120 yards hurdles and high-jump. An exceptional performance, even if inhuman."

On 5 April 1922, at the Southern Tasmanian Associated Schools' Athletics Carnival, Terry won the senior 100 yards (10.6 secs), 220 yards (24.2 secs), 440 yards (56.6 secs), 880 yards (2 mins 14 secs), he did not run in the mile; using the scissors technique he jumped 4 ft. 11in, coming second in the high jump by just half an inch, as well as coming second in the 120 yards hurdles (losing by four feet to the winner).

==== 1923 ====
On 6 April 1923, he won the 100 yards at St Virgil's College's Annual Sports; it was the only event in which he competed. On 14 April, he came second in the 100 yards Secondary School's Championship race at the Tasmanian Amateur Athletic Association's Track Championship meeting. On 18 April, he came second, "by inches", in the Open 100 yards at the Southern Tasmanian Associated Schools' Athletics Carnival.

=== Football ===
In September 1921, even though St Virgil's first XVIII well beaten by Launceston Church Grammar School 8.13 (61) to 5.12 (42) in the Secondary School's Premiership Grand Final, Terry was best on the ground. On Saturday, 27 May 1922, St. Virgil's first XVIII played against a Friends' School team that had been "considerably weakened owing to the loss of several of their best players, who had met with minor accidents prior to the match"; St. Virgil's had a massive win, scoring 34.39 (243) to NIL. Terry kicked 10 goals.

Although he was the captain of the school team in 1922, he was unable to play for St Virgil's in the deciding "North vs. South" Secondary Schools match against the Launceston Church Grammar School, because he had been injured during the previous week's match against Hutchins School.

== Cananore ==
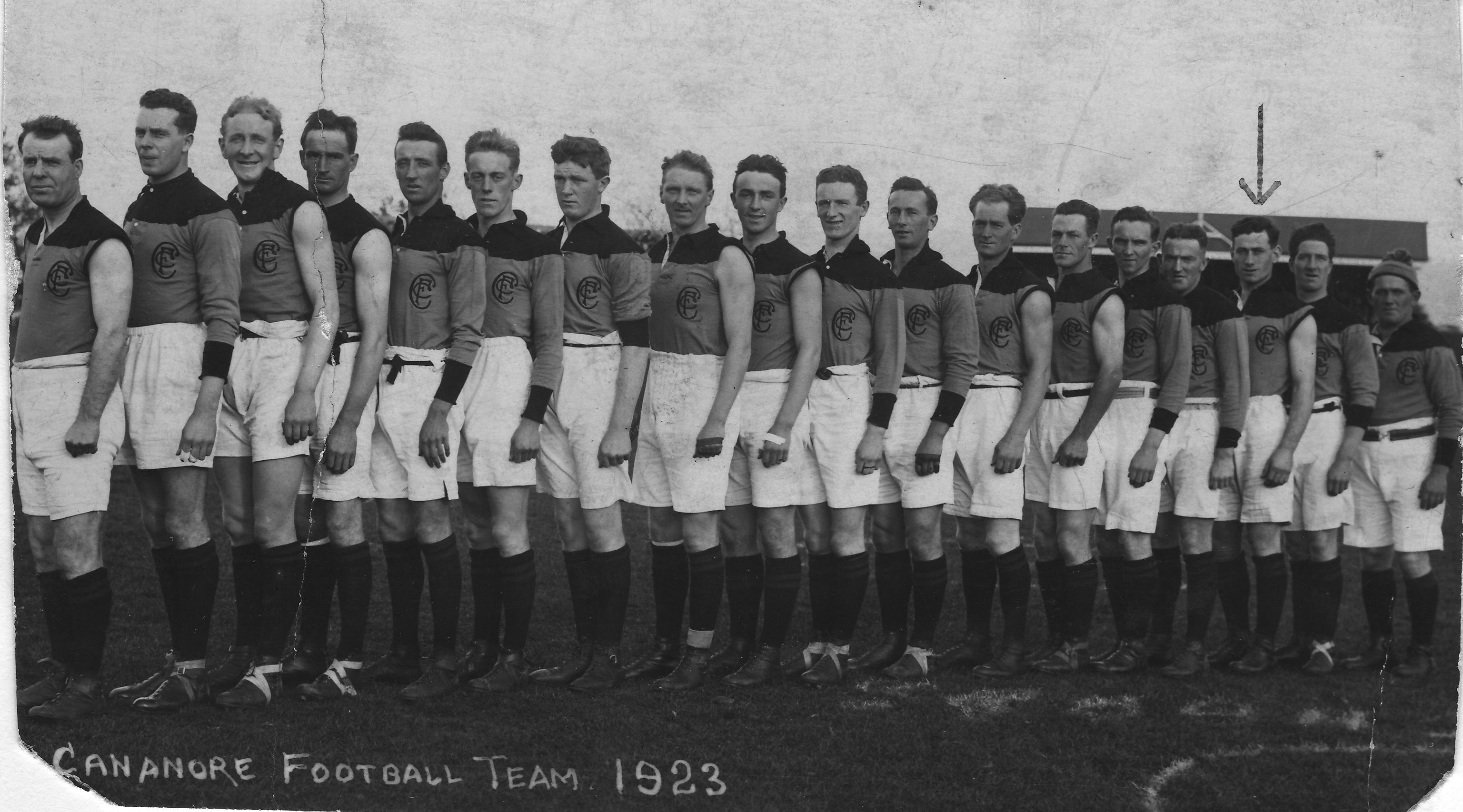
The 1923 Cananore Football Team. Jack Gardiner, the captain-coach (then aged 42), is at the far left; Ted Terry (marked with arrow) is third from the right.

Whilst still at school, in April 1922, he was also playing senior football as a wing-man with the Cananore Football Club first XVIII, in the Tasmanian Football League competition.

The team was coached by ex-Carlton and ex-Melbourne player Jack Gardiner who was, no doubt, responsible for teaching Terry the secrets of the stab-pass, and the placement of long torpedo punts and long drop-kicks, that became so much a part of Terry's game.

At that time, Cananore had somewhat of a reputation for selecting young players: Carlton's Fred Pringle played his first senior match with Cananore in 1920, aged 15, and would return to Cananore in 1925, and serve four years as Captain-Coach.

On the verge of his selection for the first match of the season, Terry was described as a schoolboy champion, who had given sufficient proof of his ability for senior distinction, and of whom good things were expected. He played in the first match of the 1922, on 5 May, at the Hobart Cricket Ground. Cananore won the match 8.13 (61) to 7.13 (55). Three months into his first season, football writers were describing him as "fast and clever" and speaking of him in the same breath as his legendary teammate, the champion rover Horrie Gorringe.

Terry played his last match for Cananore in the 1922 season on Saturday, 19 August, against North Hobart. He sustained a serious injury (a twisted knee) whilst playing school football for St Virgil's against Hutchins on Saturday, 26 August. As a consequence, was unable to play for either St. Virgil's or Cananore for the remainder of the 1922 season; and, therefore, he did not play for the Cananore first XVIII that won the 1922 TFL Grand Final, 9.12 (66) to North Hobart's 8.8 (56).

On Saturday, 21 July 1923, he played for the Southern Tasmanian Football League, in its first inter-state match of the season against an Albury and District Football League team at the North Hobart Oval. The Tasmanian team won the match, 9.10 (64) to Albury's 7.15 (57).

He played his last match for Cananore in an irregular, out-of-season match between Cananore and the season's premiers, North Hobart, at the North Hobart Oval, on Saturday, 6 October 1923, which Cananore won by two points, 8.7 (55) to 7.11 (53).

== Burnie Gift ==
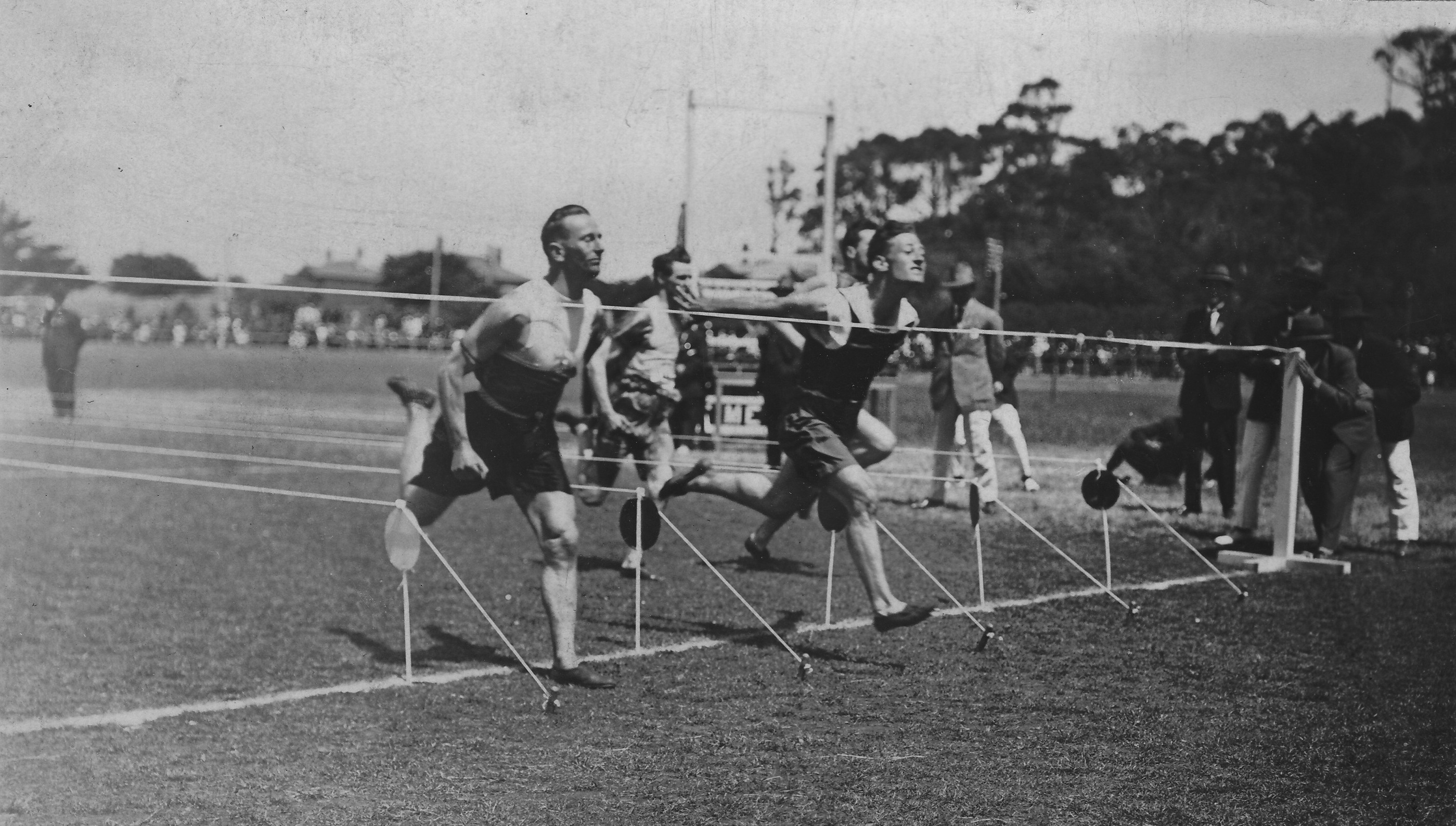
Ted Terry (11 yds), second from left, wins the 1925 Burnie Gift in 13 secs.

After leaving school he drifted into the ranks of professional foot-running. Based in Pyengana, on Tasmania's east coast, he was listed as being trained by his father, Mr. E. Terry (who is an "old hand" in Tasmanian athletics).

On Friday, 26 December 1924, running off a handicap of 11 yards, aged 20, he ran third in the (130 Yards) Ulverston Cup (later known as the Ulverston Gift) at the meeting conducted by the Ulverstone Athletics Club.

Six days later, on 1 January 1925, running off a handicap of 11 yards, he won the final of the (130 yards) Burnie Gift.

He led very narrowly for most of the way, and drew away at the finish to win from A.M. Stuart of Hobart (11 1/2 yards), with M. Campbell of Devonport (11 yards) and G.F. Triffett of Queenstown (11 yards), third and fourth respectively.

The official winning margin was half a yard (approx. 45 cm).

== Southern United ==
He was playing football for Southern United in the Tassie United Association in 1925, 1926, 1927, and 1928.

== South Melbourne ==
In 1927, Terry travelled to Melbourne from Tasmania. He trained impressively in the pre-season with South Melbourne; and, having done so, returned to Tasmania.

== St Kilda ==
In early 1929, St Kilda was very interested in the skilled and speedy Terry, and were expecting to play him as either a rover or on the wing. He performed well in the pre-season practice matches. He was placed on St Kilda's final list before the first round of the season, and was picked as a forward pocket and rover to play against Hawthorn in the first match of the season, subject to his clearance papers arriving in time. For some unknown reason, his clearance was delayed, and it did not arrive in time for him to play in the first match.

However, the Tasmanian Football League granted his clearance ("[a clearance was] granted to E.R. Terry from North-East Coast to Victoria") on Thursday, 2 May 1929. The clearance from the TFL finally arrived in Melbourne, and he was granted a permit by the VFL to play on Wednesday, 8 May, just in time for him to be picked on the wing for the match against Geelong, in Round 3 of 1929, on Saturday 11 May 1929, at the Junction Oval, four weeks before his 25th birthday. On that same day, another Tasmanian and former Cananore player, Alan Scott, four years older than Terry, also made his debut for St Kilda.

St Kilda was expected to win the match: the teams were level, 4.8 (32) to 4.8 (32), at half time; Geelong only scored two behinds in the third quarter, and was behind 7.9 (51) to 4.10 (34); however Geelong surged back in the last quarter, kicking 4 goals and 2 behinds to St Kilda's one goal, winning the match 8.12 (60) to 8.9 (57).

Terry sustained a serious thigh injury during a torrid game; and, although the content of the match reports are intentionally somewhat vague, it would seem that he was deliberately maimed, rather than accidentally injured. The match was also marred by the spectators swarming on to the ground at the end of the match and attempting to attack the umpire. Following the match, and based upon his performances in training and on the playing field, Wallace Sharland of The Sporting Globe was confident that Terry had a future:

"Terry … had his first run with St. Kilda on Saturday, and was tried on the wing. He was not too successful. Though he showed plenty of pace, his anticipation and judgment were often astray and he made a number of costly mistakes. Still, Terry is probably worth persisting with. You cannot judge a man on one game. Stars of other days have made poor debuts. With more experience Terry may do quite well. He is very fast and is an eager player, so with experience he may come good."

A film was taken of the match that Terry played in against Geelong. It is not known whether the film still exists; or, even, whether the film actually showed Terry at rest, or in action, at all.

Terry was not fit to play on the following Saturday. His injury was such that he was not fit to play at all for a number of weeks.

== Prahran ==
Without playing another senior game, he was transferred, by St Kilda, to the Association club Prahran, on 26 June 1929.

He played for the Prahran senior team immediately his clearance was granted. In his second match, on 6 July 1929, again playing on the half-forward flank, he kicked one goal in Prahran's 16.21 (117) to 9.6 (60) win over Camberwell.

He was playing at Prahran again in 1930, and was selected on the wing for the first match of the season, against Port Melbourne; he played continuously until he suffered a severe rib injury in round 12 (Saturday, 12 July 1930). He did not play for the seniors again in 1930; and, there seems to be no trace of him playing in any of the later seasons.

== Field umpire ==
Upon his return to Tasmania, he served as a central football umpire for several seasons.

== After football ==
He won the 1938 Men's Reserve "B" Grade Singles final in the Southern Tasmanian Lawn Tennis Association's Summer Tournament. He was playing Reserve "A" Grade Tennis in Hobart in 1938. In January 1939, he took part in the Southern Tasmanian Lawn Tennis Association's Summer Tournament, winning his match in the first round of the Men's Open Singles, and losing in the second.

In April 1949, he entered the North-Eastern Mixed Doubles Championship, with his daughter Jill as his partner.

== War service ==
During World War II he saw active service in the Royal Australian Air Force from 1941 to 1945 as a transport driver, serving for some time in New Guinea.

== Civil service ==
Having worked for many years in various aspects of the timber industry and, once he ceased working at his father's timber mill at Derby, he went on to work for the Forestry Department of the Government of Tasmania.
