= 1938 TANFL season =

57th season of the Tasmanian Australian National Football League

- Teams: 4
- Premiers: North Hobart; 12th premiership
- Minor premiers: North Hobart
- Leading goalkicker: T. Richardson (North Hobart − 70 goals)

The 1938 TANFL season was the 57th season of the Tasmanian Australian National Football League (TANFL), the highest-level senior Australian rules football competition in southern Tasmania.

North Hobart won the TANFL premiership for the 12th time, defeating Lefroy by 12 points in the final.

== Ladder ==
Pos	Team	Pld	W	L	D	Pts	Qualification
1	North Hobart (P)	15	11	4	0	52	Finals series
2	Lefroy	15	9	6	0	44	Finals series
3	Cananore	15	7	8	0	32	Finals series
4	New Town	15	3	12	0	16	

Rules for classification: 1) points; 2) percentage; 3) number of points for.
(P) Premiers

== Finals ==
From 1929 until 1941, the TANFL home-and-away season featured three rounds played for 4 premiership points per win, and two rounds played for 6 premiership points per win. A three-team system with challenge was then played, with the initial 1–3 positions based on premiership points, and the right of challenge going only to the team with the strictly best home-and-away season win-loss record.

=== Semi-final ===
	Semi-final
Saturday, 24 September	Lefroy 17.17 (119)	def.	Cananore 15.19 (109)	North Hobart Oval (crowd: 6,000)

=== Grand final ===
1938 TANFL grand final
Saturday, 1 October	North Hobart	def.	Lefroy	North Hobart Oval (crowd: 7,319)
5.4 (34); 9.7 (61); 12.10 (82); 13.15 (93)	Q1; Q2; Q3; Final	2.3 (15); 7.6 (48); 7.12 (54); 11.15 (81)
T. Richardson 4, L. Smith 2, Tyler 2, Pratt 2, F. Smith, Lucas, Jones	Goals	McCarthy 3, Rae 2, Gould 2, Zschech, Badenach, Butler, Rogers
Reports	Lee, for striking L. Smith
Had Lefroy won, North Hobart (which had the best win-loss record) would have been entitled under the challenge rule to a rematch the following Saturday to decide the premiership.

== Awards ==
- Len Pye (North Hobart) won the George Watt memorial medal as the TANFL's best and fairest player.
- T. Richardson (North Hobart) was the TANFL's leading goalkicker, finishing the home-and-away season with 70 goals.
- North Hobart was defeated in the Tasmanian State Premiership by Launceston (NTFA) on 8 October at York Park. Launceston 16.9 (105) defeated North Hobart 5.9 (39).
