= 1940 TANFL season =

59th season of the Tasmanian Australian National Football League

- Teams: 4
- Premiers: North Hobart; 14th premiership
- Minor premiers: North Hobart
- William Leitch Medallist: Geoff Kilmartin (Cananore)
- Leading goalkicker: Jack Metherell (North Hobart − 69 goals)

The 1940 TANFL season was the 59th season of the Tasmanian Australian National Football League (TANFL), the highest-level senior Australian rules football competition in southern Tasmania.

North Hobart won the TSL premiership for the 14th time and the third year in a row, defeating Cananore by 57 points in the 1940 TANFL Grand Final.

== Ladder ==
Pos	Team	Pld	W	L	D	PF	PA	PP	Pts	Qualification
1	North Hobart (P)	15	10	5	0				46	Finals series
2	Cananore	15	8	7	0				38	Finals series
3	Lefroy	15	6	9	0				32	Finals series
4	New Town	15	6	9	0				28	

Rules for classification: 1) points; 2) percentage; 3) number of points for.
(P) Premiers

== Finals ==
From 1929 until 1941, the TANFL home-and-away season featured three rounds played for 4 premiership points per win, and two rounds played for 6 premiership points per win. A three-team system with challenge was then played, with the initial 1–3 positions based on premiership points, and the right of challenge going only to the team with the strictly best home-and-away season win-loss record.

=== Semi-final ===
	Semi-final
Saturday, 31 August	Cananore 13.6 (84)	def.	Lefroy 12.6 (78)	North Hobart Oval (crowd: 3,990)

=== Grand final ===
1940 TANFL grand final
Saturday, 17 September (3:00 pm)	North Hobart	def.	Cananore	North Hobart Oval (crowd: 5,420)
5.2 (32); 8.2 (50); 15.6 (96); 18.8 (116)	Q1; Q2; Q3; Final	2.6 (18); 6.10 (46); 6.10 (46); 7.17 (59)
Metherell 6, Pye 4, T. Richardson 3, Gray 2, Manson, Gorman, Jones	Goals	N. Richardson 2, Sproule, McDonald, Cooper, Tudor, Cook
Abbott, Metherell, Pye, Challender, T. Richardson, Collis, Jones, Taylor, Andrews, Hooper, Loring, Goggins	Best	Watkins, Turner, Sproule, Gaunt, Lette, Haley, Cashman, McDonald, Geappen, Clothier, Cooper, Tudor, Kelly
Had Cananore won, North Hobart (which had the best win-loss record) would have been entitled under the challenge rule to a rematch the following Saturday to decide the premiership.

== Awards ==
- Geoff Kilmartin (Cananore) won the William Leitch Medal as the TANFL's best and fairest player.
- Jack Metherell (North Hobart) was the TANFL's leading goalkicker, finishing the season with 69 goals.
- North Hobart won the Tasmanian State Premiership for the seventh time and the second year in a row, defeating Launceston (NTFA) by 56 points on 28 September 1940.
