= 1926 TFL season =

45th season of the Tasmanian Australian National Football League

1926 TANFL season
- Teams: 4
- Premiers: Cananore; 8th premiership
- Leading goalkicker: J. Brain (Cananore – 64 goals)

The 1926 TANFL season was the 45th season of the Tasmanian Football League (TFL), the highest-level senior Australian rules football competition in southern Tasmania.

Cananore won the TANFL premiership for the 8th time, defeating New Town in the grand final by 32 points.

== Ladder ==
In 1926, the roster matches were to feature three rounds played for 2 premiership points per win, then three rounds played for 4 premiership points per win – a scheduled total of 18 matches. Then, if necessary, the club with the most or equal-most premiership points would play a grand final against the club with best win–loss record, if that record was equal or better than that of the premiership points leader, to determine the premiers.

After sixteen matches, the league opted to cancel Lefroy's and North Hobart's remaining two matches. Then in the only remaining roster match, New Town 9.11 (65) defeated Cananore 7.16 (58) to tie the two clubs on points and force a grand final.

Pos	Team	Pld	W	L	D	Pts	Qualification
1	Cananore (P)	17	13	4	0	36	Grand final
2	New Town	17	11	6	0	36	Grand final
3	Lefroy	16	5	11	0	12	
4	North Hobart	16	4	12	0	12	

Rules for classification: 1) points; 2) percentage; 3) number of points for.
(P) Premiers

=== Grand final ===
1926 TFL grand final
Saturday, 9 October	Cananore	def.	New Town	North Hobart Oval (crowd: 10,000)
3.1 (19); 7.3 (45); 10.6 (66); 14.8 (92)	Q1; Q2; Q3; Final	3.5 (23); 7.7 (49); 7.9 (51); 8.12 (60)
Ahearne 6, Ford 2, Gorringe 2, Pringle, R. Johns, Bowden	Goals	Friend 2, Moore 2, Rowe 2, Robertson, Mills
Ford, for fighting C. Lucas, for striking O'Brien; E. Doolan, for striking Paul	Reports	Williams, for fighting

== Awards ==
- Cananore won the Tasmanian State Premiership, defeating Launceston (NTFA) on 16 October at York Park before a crowd of 7,000. After building a 38-point lead in the first quarter, Cananore managed only one more goal for the match, and ultimately Cananore 7.10 (52) defeated Launceston 5.20 (50) by two points.
