= 1919 TFL season =

38th season of the Tasmanian Football League

- Date: 10 May – 18 August 1919
- Teams: 3
- Premiers: No premiership awarded

The 1919 TFL season was the 38th season of the Tasmanian Football League (TFL), the highest-level senior Australian rules football competition in southern Tasmania. The season began on 10 May and was curtailed on 18 August because of the global influenza pandemic.

This was the first TFL season since 1915, as the competition had been suspended between 1916 and 1918 because of the impacts of World War I, with a meeting of the TFL's committee on 21 February 1919 deciding to go ahead with the season. Three clubs − Cananore, Lefroy and North Hobart − competed.

== Premiership season ==
In 1919, the roster matches were to feature three rounds played for 2 premiership points per win, then two rounds played for 4 premiership points per win – a scheduled total of 10 matches per club. Then, if necessary, the club with the most or equal-most premiership points would play a grand final against the club with best win–loss record, if that record was equal or better than that of the premiership points leader, to determine the premiers.

In August 1919, with three matches remaining for the season, the global influenza pandemic (also known as the Spanish flu) reached Tasmania. This forced the state government to cancel all sporting activities that attracted crowds, including the TFL.

In mid-September, with no sign of restrictions lifting, the league called an end to the season. As the season was cancelled before it could be completed, no premiership was awarded. At the time of the cancellation, Cananore was the leading club, sitting undefeated at the top of the ladder, but not in an unassailable position.

Pos	Team	Pld	W	L	D	Pts	Qualification
1	Cananore	7	7	0	0	16	
2	North Hobart	7	3	4	0	8	
3	Lefroy	8	1	7	0	2	

Rules for classification: 1) points; 2) percentage; 3) number of points for.
(P) Premiers
