= Metherell =

Metherell may refer to:

== Places ==
- Metherell, Devon neolithic stone-hut circle enclosure as spelt on 1763 tithe map. Note (also 20th century spelling as Metherall)
- Metherell, Devon a farmstead located next to the Fernworthy Reservoir, Dartmoor National Park, Devon United Kingdom
- Metheral Hill ancient mining area within the military compound at Dartmoor NPA, near Oke Tor and South Zeal village.
- Metherell, Cornwall a village in Cornwall, United Kingdom

== People ==
- Jack Metherell (1912–1992), footballer
- Len Metherell (1908–1992), footballer
- Terry Metherell (born 1947), politician
