= Jeff Coombes =

Australian academic and exercise physiologist

- Born: Hobart, Tasmania, Australia
- Education: University of Tasmania; University of Florida
- Known for: Exercise physiology research
- Awards: Fellow of Exercise and Sports Science Australia; Fellow of the American College of Sports Medicine
- Scientific career
- Fields: Clinical exercise physiology
- Workplaces: University of Queensland
- Doctoral advisor: Scott Powers

Jeff Scott Coombes is an Australian academic and Professor of Clinical Exercise Physiology in the School of Human Movement and Nutrition Sciences at the University of Queensland. He is the National Director of the Exercise is Medicine Australia initiative. His research addresses the physiological effects of exercise, including high-intensity training, on physical fitness and health outcomes. According to institutional sources, his publications have been cited over 30,000 times and he has an H-index exceeding 90.

== Early life and education ==
Coombes attended St Virgil's College in Hobart, Tasmania from 1970 to 1982. He subsequently completed a four-year apprenticeship as a motor mechanic with the Hydro Electric Commission. He earned undergraduate degrees in applied sport science and physical education and later a research master's degree from the University of Tasmania. He obtained his PhD in exercise physiology at the University of Florida, under the supervision of Scott Powers. His doctoral research examined exercise training and antioxidant supplementation in relation to oxidative stress and cardiac function. After his PhD, he held an academic position at the University of Tasmania for two years before joining the University of Queensland in 2000.

== Academic career ==
Coombes was promoted to Professor in the School of Human Movement and Nutrition Sciences at the University of Queensland in 2012. He is a Fellow of Exercise and Sports Science Australia (ESSA) and the American College of Sports Medicine (ACSM).

== Publications ==
Coombes has authored more than 400 peer-reviewed journal articles, nine book chapters, and several textbooks, including co-editing ESSA Student Manual for Health, Exercise and Sport Assessment and ESSA Student Manual for Exercise Prescription, Delivery and Adherence.

== Research ==
His research includes both human studies and basic science projects in biochemistry and physiology. Laboratory investigations address the cellular and molecular mechanisms of exercise, particularly in the cardiovascular and musculoskeletal systems. He has participated in large-scale clinical exercise intervention trials, published in medical journals, involving populations with conditions such as diabetes, cardiovascular disease, mild cognitive impairment, liver disease, chronic kidney disease, and older adults.

Findings from these trials have contributed to national position statements on exercise in relation to kidney disease, diabetes, hypertension, and pregnancy, which he co-authored. These documents have been used in policy and clinical guidance on exercise and health.

== Awards and recognition ==
Coombes has served as a chief investigator on research funding exceeding AU$20 million. Expertscape ranks him 2nd in Australia and 37th internationally for contributions to 'cardiorespiratory fitness' research, and 10th in Australia and 43rd internationally for 'exercise' research. He was listed among the Top 25 Influencers of Sport and Exercise Science in Australia by Exercise and Sport Science Australia. In 2014, he received the ESSA President's Award. He has also received institutional recognition for research and mentorship activities.
