= St Virgil's College =

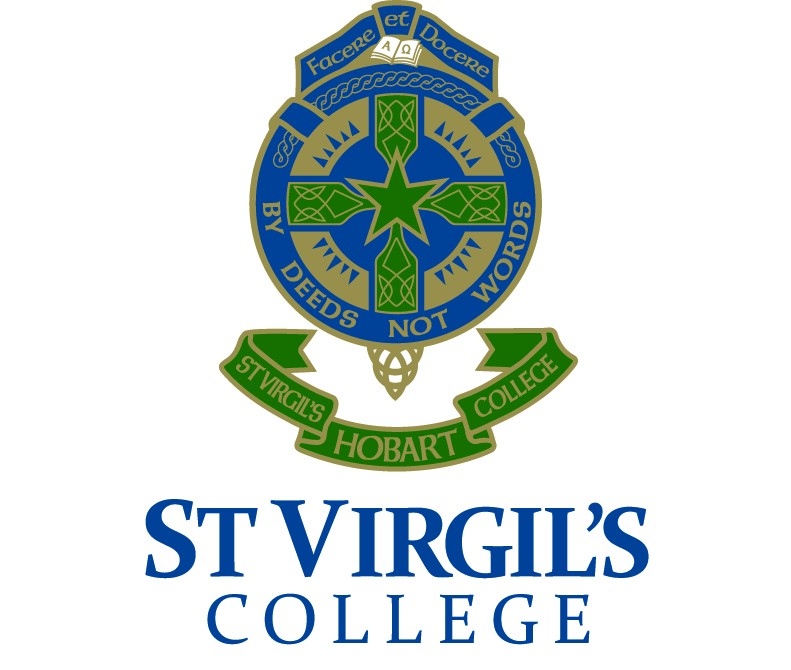

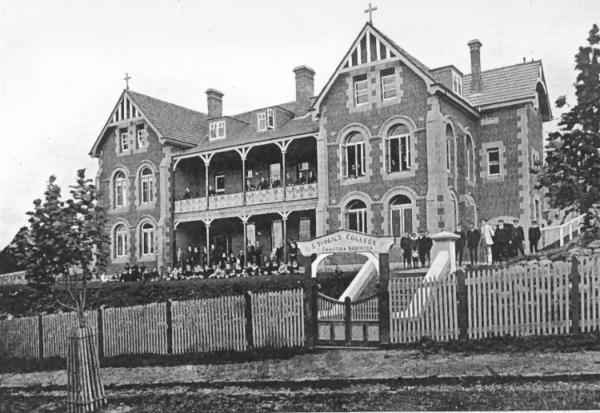
- St Virgil's College, 1911

Location
- Austins Ferry and Hobart, Tasmania; Australia; 42°46′30″S 147°15′05″E

Information
- Type: Independent primary and secondary school
- Motto: By Deeds not Words Alone
- Religious affiliation: Catholicism
- Denomination: Congregation of Christian Brothers
- Established: 24 January 1911; 115 years ago
- Oversight: Archdiocese of Hobart, Tasmanian Catholic Education Office
- Trust: Edmund Rice Education Australia
- Principal: Jon Franzin
- Years offered: Kindergarten–Year 12
- Gender: Boys
- Enrolment: c. 750 (2008)
- Colours: Royal blue, green and gold
- Affiliations: Junior School Heads Association of Australia; Heads of Independent Schools of Australia; Sports Association of Tasmanian Independent Schools
- Alumni: Old Virgilian
- Website: www.stvirgils.tas.edu.au

St Virgil's College is an independent Catholic primary and secondary day school for boys, located over two campuses in Austins Ferry and Hobart, Tasmania, Australia. Established in 1911 by the Congregation of Christian Brothers, the College has a non-selective enrolment policy and caters for approximately 680 students, from Kindergarten to Year 12, with 120 at the junior campus and 480 at the senior campus.

St Virgil's is affiliated with the Junior School Heads Association of Australia (JSHAA), the Association of Heads of Independent Schools of Australia (AHISA), and is a member of the Sports Association of Tasmanian Independent Schools (SATIS). Oversight of the school is administered by the Archdiocese of Hobart, Tasmanian Catholic Education Office, and the school is a member of Edmund Rice Education Australia.

== History ==
St Virgil's College was formally opened on 22 January 1911 by The Christian Brothers. Leo Doyle was the first student admitted to the college. At is foundation the college was a boarding school for boys located in Barrack Street, Hobart. The boarding section of the college was closed in 1970 and since then St Virgil's College has been a day school only.

In 1962, another campus was opened in Austins Ferry, offering junior secondary grades (Grades 7–9) on a riverside property of 30 hectares. In 1991, three Grade 10 streams were also added. 2012 marks the 50 year celebrations for the campus.

The Barrack Street campus then expanded for students from Grades 7–12 until 1994 when, under the Southern Secondary Schools Restructuring Plan, the campus no longer accepted enrolments for Grade 7. At the end of 1994, Grades 8, 11 and 12 ceased to run at the Barrack Street campus, and all secondary grades were moved to the Austins Ferry campus. This allowed Guilford Young College (Grades 11 and 12) to be established on the Barrack Street site. Grades 9 and 10 still ran in 1995, and only Grade 10 was offered in 1996.

After 1996, St Virgil's College ceased to operate any of its classes on the Barrack Street campus. From then on, Grades 7–10 were all taught at the Austins Ferry campus, and because of the discontinuation of Grades 11–12, many students moved on to the newly formed Guilford Young College for their pre-tertiary years.

In August 1995, permission was granted for St Peter's School to become the St Virgil's College Junior School from 1996 onwards. The Junior School now accommodates boys from Grades 3–6 and operates on the old St Peter's School site in Patrick Street.

The current principal of St Virgil's College is John Franzin, who was appointed in 2022. Damian Messer left the college in 2021 to carry out other goals and explore different paths. In 2009, Christopher D. Smith left the college to carry out higher duties. Franzin is now the full-time principal, with Daniel Lapolla as the vice-principal teacher of the college, who replaced Heidi Senior in 2021.

In 2019, it was announced that St Virgil's College would expand from a Year 3–10 school to a kindergarten to Year 12 school. Since 2023, the college has catered for Year 11 and 12 students, with the first cohort of Year 12s graduating in 2024.

== Notable alumni ==
An alumnus of St Virgil's College is known as an 'Old Virgilian' and may elect to join the school's alumni association, the Old Virgilians' Association. The Association was established in 1916 as a way for Old Virgilians to meet regularly and keep in touch with news about the college. Some notable Old Virgilians include:

Entertainment, media and the arts

- Anthony Ackroyd – comedian and writer
- Geoff "Jeff" Hook – cartoonist
- Tom Lewis – author, military historian and naval officer
- Toby Leonard Moore – actor
- Don Sharp – film director
- Peter Damian Williams – author and military historian
- Jeff Coombes – Distinguished Professor of Clinical Exercise Physiology

Military

- Major General Michael Crane AM – Commander of all Australian Forces in the Middle East area of operations (Iraq)

Politics, public service and the law

- Henry Cosgrove AM – Judge of the Supreme Court of Tasmania
- William Cox – Governor of Tasmania
- Anthony Fletcher – former member of the Legislative Council
- Peter Heerey – Justice of the Federal Court of Australia
- Pierre Hutton – diplomat
- Gintaras Kantvilas – scientist (lichenologist) & state public servant
- Paul Lennon – 42nd Premier of Tasmania
- Doug Lowe – 35th Premier of Tasmania
- Kenneth Lowrie OBE – former member of the Legislative Council and Glenorchy Alderman
- Albert Ogilvie – 28th Premier of Tasmania

Religion

- Adrian Leo Doyle – Archbishop of Hobart
- Michael Tate – Catholic priest and former Federal Justice Minister

Sport

- Scott Bowden – Olympic mountain bike rider and road cyclist
- Scott Brennan – Australian rowing Olympic gold medallist and world champion
- Sean Clingeleffer – cricket player; Tasmanian wicketkeeper
- Sam Darley – Australian rules footballer
- Michael Di Venuto – cricket player for the Tasmanian Tigers and Derbyshire County
- Brodie Holland – Australian rules footballer for Collingwood Magpies
- Simon Hollingsworth – 400 metre hurdles 2X [Olympian and 3X Commonwealth Games representative; Rhodes Scholar
- Eric Huxtable – Australian rules footballer
- Caleb Jewell – cricket player for North Hobart, Tasmanian Tigers and Hobart Hurricanes
- Oliver O'Halloran – youngest person to fly around world solo, unassisted, completed in 2017
- Jack Riewoldt – Australian rules footballer for Richmond Tigers
- Sid Taberlay – Olympic mountain bike rider
- Ted Terry – outstanding schoolboy athlete, winner of the 1925 Burnie Gift, and – Australian rules footballer for St Kilda Saints
- Tristan Thomas – Australian representative to the 2012 Olympics in athletics
- Peter Toogood – former Australian amateur golf champion
- Max Giuliani - Australian swimming Olympic Bronze medallist

== See also ==
- List of schools in Tasmania
- List of Christian Brothers schools
- Education in Tasmania
- Catholic education in Australia
