= Hilton Buckney =

Australian rules footballer, born 1910

Personal information
- Full name: Hilton Edward Buckney
- Born: 5 June 1910; Glenorchy, Tasmania
- Died: 27 September 1987 (aged 77); Moonah, Tasmania
- Original team: Lefroy
- Height: 179 cm (5 ft 10 in)
- Weight: 80 kg (176 lb)

Playing career^{1}
Years	Club	Games (Goals)
1932	Hawthorn	11 (3)
- ^{1} Playing statistics correct to the end of 1932.

Hilton Edward Buckney (5 June 1910 – 27 September 1987) was an Australian Rules footballer from Tasmania who played in the 1920s and 1930s. He played with the Lefroy Football Club in the TFL for most of his career and captained his state at the 1933 Sydney Carnival.

In 1932 Buckney played 11 games for Hawthorn in the VFL and kicked three goals. He debuted in Round 4 versus Carlton at Princes Park.
