= Peter Damian Williams =

Australian author and military historian (born 1957)

Peter Damian Williams is an Australian author and military historian. He was born in Hobart in 1957 and educated at St Virgil's College. He taught history in the Northern Territory and Japan and now lives in Canberra. Peter Williams holds the degrees of BA, Dip. Ed, MA and PhD.

== Publications ==
- A Ridge Too Far, Gallipoli supplement, Sydney Morning Herald, 25 April 2004.
- The Ottoman artillery bombardment at Gallipoli, Wartime, magazine of the Australian War Memorial, no. 34, 2005
- The Japanese 18th Army in New Guinea, Wartime, magazine of the Australian War Memorial, no. 36, 2006
- An Imperial Japanese Navy pilot in New Guinea, Headmark, Journal of the Australian Naval Institute, no. 125, 2007
- Zero Hours, Australian Warship, no. 38, 2007
- The Battle of Anzac Ridge, 25 April 1915, Australian Military History Publications, 2007
- Canakkale Savasi Kanlisirt Muharebesi, 25 Nisan 1915, Kitap Yayinevi, Istanbul, 2009
- The Kokoda Track, Exploring the site of the battle fought by Australians in WWII, Department of Veterans' Affairs, 2010
- Australia’s Involvement in the Korean War, Department of Veterans' Affairs, 2011
- Kokoda, exploring the Second World War Campaign in Papua New Guinea, (educational resource) Department of Veterans' Affairs, 2011
- The Kokoda Campaign 1942, Myth and Reality, Cambridge University Press, Melbourne, 2012
- Kokoda for Dummies, Wiley and Sons, Melbourne, 2012
- Japan's Pacific War: Personal Accounts of the Emperor's Warriors, Pen and Sword, Barnsley, 2021
