= Peter Heerey =

Australian judge (1939–2021)

The Honourable Peter Heerey AM, QC

Judge of the Federal Court of Australia
- In office 17 December 1990 – 16 February 2009

Personal details
- Born: 16 February 1939 Hobart, Tasmania, Australia
- Died: 1 May 2021 (aged 82) Melbourne, Victoria, Australia
- Education: University of Tasmania
- Profession: Judge

Peter Cadden Heerey AM QC (16 February 1939 – 1 May 2021) was a judge of the Federal Court of Australia from 1990 to 2009.

Heerey attended St Virgil's College and the University of Tasmania, graduating with a Bachelor of Arts and a Bachelor of Laws (first class honours) degree. He practised as a solicitor in Hobart, before moving to Melbourne to become a barrister in 1967, and was appointed Queen's Counsel in 1985.

Heerey was appointed to the Federal Court of Australia in 1990. In 1992, he was a judge of the Supreme Court of Vanuatu.

In 2000 he was appointed President of the Australian Defence Force Discipline Appeals Tribunal, in 2003 a Deputy President of the Australian Competition Tribunal and in 2005 a Presidential Member of the Administrative Appeals Tribunal. Heerey published papers in Australian and overseas professional and academic journals in the areas of corporations law, defamation, expert evidence, intellectual property, law and literature and Federation history. He was 'Judge in Residence' at Samford University, Birmingham. Alabama (1993), McGill University, Montreal, Quebec (1996–97), University College Dublin (2001) and the University of Tasmania (2005). In 2007 he taught a course in Patent and Trade Mark Law at the Monash University campus in Prato, Italy.

Heerey retired from the court on 16 February 2009, upon reaching the mandatory retirement age of 70.

Heerey subsequently practised at the Victorian Bar specialising in advice, arbitration and mediation. He was an Associate of the Chartered Institute of Arbitrators.

On 26 January 2012 Heerey was awarded a Member in the General Division of the Order of Australia (AM) for his "service to the judiciary through the Federal Court, to the development of legal principle in the areas of intellectual property, trade practices and military law, and to the community".

As a judge, he presided over the high-profile case regarding collusion charges against businessman Richard Pratt, which resulted in the largest fine for collusion against an Australian business in history.

Heerey died on 1 May 2021 in Melbourne, aged 82.
