= Alan Scott (footballer, born 1900) =

Australian rules footballer (1900–1982)

Personal information
- Full name: Alan Gordon Forcett Scott
- Born: 25 August 1900; Ringarooma, Tasmania
- Died: 2 October 1982 (aged 82)
- Height: 183 cm (6 ft 0 in)
- Weight: 83 kg (183 lb)
- Position: Ruckman

Playing career^{1}
Years	Club	Games (Goals)
1919–25, 1931–32	North Launceston	133 (?)
1926	Warracknabeal	? (?)
1927–28	Cananore	
1929–30	St Kilda	32 (26)
1933	New Town	
- ^{1} Playing statistics correct to the end of 1933.

Alan Gordon Forcett Scott (25 August 1900 – 2 October 1982) was an Australian rules footballer who played for St Kilda in the Victorian Football League (VFL). He also had a noted career in Tasmania in both the Northern Tasmanian Football Association (NTFA) and Tasmanian Football League (TFL).

== Football ==
=== North Launceston ===
Scott, a Tasmanian, started his career at North Launceston, where his twin brother Don also played. He was a member of their 1923 and 1925 NTFA premierships.

=== Warracknabeal ===
The 1926 season was spent at Warracknabeal in country Victoria, where he had gone to study "scientific farming".

While studying at Warracknabeal he played football with the Warracknabeal Football Club in the Wimmera Football League.

=== Cananore ===
In 1927, he returned to Tasmania, and began his two-season stint with Cananore, which included a premiership in 1927.

=== St Kilda ===
A ruckman who could be used in the key positions, Scott returned to the mainland in 1929 to play for St Kilda.

He played his first senior VFL match when nearly 29 years old for St Kilda against Geelong, in round 3 of 1929 at the Junction Oval. On that same day, another Tasmanian and former Cananore player, Ted Terry, also made his debut for St Kilda.

He participated in a rare St Kilda finals series, kicking two goals in an eight-point semi final loss to Carlton at the MCG.

=== North Launceston ===
Back at North Launceston in 1931, Scott was appointed captain-coach and steered them to another premiership.

=== New Town ===
In 1933, his final season, he captain-coached New Town.

=== Interstate Football ===
During his career, Scott represented Tasmania at both the 1924 Hobart and 1927 Melbourne Carnivals.

== Tasmanian Football Hall of Fame ==
He was one of the inaugural inductees into the Tasmanian Football Hall of Fame in 2005.

== See also ==
- 1924 Hobart Carnival
- 1927 Melbourne Carnival
