= 1941 TANFL season =

Australian rules football season

- Teams: Cananore Canaries; Lefroy Blues; New Town Magpies; North Hobart Robins
- Premiers: North Hobart
- Minor premiers: North Hobart

The 1941 Tasmanian Australian National Football League (TANFL) premiership season was an Australian rules football competition staged in Hobart, Tasmania, over fourteen roster rounds and two finals series matches between 10 May and 20 September 1941.

This was the final season of pre-World War II football, which resulted in most clubs struggling to field full squads of players due to enlistment in the military forces. In the off-season the TANFL considered instituting a competition for players too young to serve in the military, but it did not pursue the idea.

This was the final season of both Cananore and Lefroy Football Clubs, which both folded during the wartime cessation.

== Participating clubs ==
- Cananore Football Club
- Lefroy Football Club
- New Town Football Club
- North Hobart Football Club

=== 1941 TANFL club coaches ===
- Jack Cashman (Cananore)
- K. Fraser (Lefroy)
- Alf Sampson and E. Hanlon (stand-in) (New Town)
- Jack Metherell (North Hobart)

=== TANFL reserves grand final ===
- North Hobart 7.4 (46) v Lefroy 2.6 (18) – North Hobart Oval

=== TANFL under-19s grand final ===
State Schools Old Boys Football Association (SSOBFA) (Saturday, 13 September 1941)

- North West 5.5 (35) v Macalburn 4.6 (30) – New Town Oval

=== State grand final ===
(Saturday, 27 September 1941)

- North Hobart: 3.5 (23) | 5.8 (38) | 11.15 (81) | 13.18 (96)
- City: 4.2 (26) | 4.8 (32) | 6.12 (48) | 12.19 (91)
- Attendance: 3,960 at North Hobart Oval

=== Intrastate matches ===
(Saturday, 7 June 1941)

- TANFL 14.15 (99) v NTFA 14.9 (93) – Att: 4,000 at North Hobart Oval

(Saturday, 28 June 1941)

- TANFL 15.14 (104) v NTFA 10.20 (80) – Att: 4,000 (approx) at York Park

=== Lightning premiership matches ===
TANFL Patriotic Effort Benefit (Saturday, 19 July 1941)

- Cananore 4.5 (29) v Lefroy 4.2 (26)
- North Hobart 2.8 (20) v New Town 3.1 (19)
- Cananore 5.2 (32) v North Hobart 3.4 (22)
- Attendance: 3,000 (Approx) at North Hobart Oval

Note: All matches played in two short halves; a total of £132 was raised to help the war effort.

Red Cross & Comforts Fund Benefit (Queen of Sport) (Saturday, 6 September 1941)

- North Hobart 4.7 (31) v Lefroy 0.6 (6)
- Cananore 9.3 (57) v New Town 2.10 (22)
- North Hobart 8.12 (60) v Cananore 1.6 (12)
- Attendance: 1,570 at North Hobart Oval

Note: A total of £99 through gate takings was raised for the Queen of Sport war fund.

=== Leading goalkickers: TANFL ===
- Jack Metherell (North Hobart) – 64

=== Medal winners ===
- Max Abbott (North Hobart) – George Watt Memorial Medal
- T. Williams (New Town) – Allan Watt Medal (seconds)
- L. Tew (Buckingham) – V. A. Geard Medal (under-19s)

== 1941 TANFL ladder ==
Pos	Team	Pld	W	L	D	PF	PA	PP	Pts
1	North Hobart	14	12	2	0	1329	975	136.3	56
2	Cananore	14	8	6	0	1184	1141	103.8	36
3	New Town	14	5	9	0	1079	1188	90.8	28
4	Lefroy	14	3	11	0	1054	1350	78.1	12

Under the TANFL's season structure, matches scored:

- 4 points for a win, 2 points for a draw from rounds 1–9
- 6 points for a win, 3 points for a draw from rounds 10–15

=== Round 1 ===
(Saturday, 10 May 1941)

- North Hobart 7.15 (57) v Cananore 6.17 (53) – Att: 1,000 (approx) at North Hobart Oval
- Lefroy 16.24 (120) v New Town 6.13 (49) – Att: 600 (approx) at TCA Ground

=== Round 2 ===
(Saturday, 17 May 1941)

- North Hobart 18.15 (123) v Lefroy 6.9 (45) – Att: 1,700 (approx) at North Hobart Oval
- Cananore 14.13 (97) v New Town 10.11 (71) – Att: 630 at TCA Ground

=== Round 3 ===
(Saturday, 24 May 1941)

- North Hobart 10.16 (76) v New Town 9.9 (63) – Att: 1,500 (approx) at North Hobart Oval
- Lefroy 12.8 (80) v Cananore 8.18 (66) – Att: 760 at TCA Ground

=== Round 4 ===
(Saturday, 31 May 1941)

- Lefroy 9.20 (74) v New Town 9.11 (65) – Att: 567 at North Hobart Oval
- North Hobart 16.23 (119) v Cananore 13.10 (88) – Att: 700 (approx) at TCA Ground

=== Round 5 ===
(Saturday, 14 June & Monday, 16 June 1941)

- Cananore 14.7 (91) v New Town 10.20 (80) – Att: 1,500 (approx) at North Hobart Oval (Saturday)
- North Hobart 14.18 (102) v Lefroy 11.12 (78) – Att: 2,000 (approx) at North Hobart Oval (Monday)

=== Round 6 ===
(Saturday, 21 June 1941)

- Cananore 15.18 (108) v Lefroy 10.16 (76) – Att: 1,200 (approx) at North Hobart Oval
- North Hobart 19.26 (140) v New Town 7.14 (56) – Att: 800 at TCA Ground

=== Round 7 ===
(Saturday, 5 July 1941)

- Cananore 7.8 (50) v North Hobart 4.12 (36) – Att: 520 at North Hobart Oval
- New Town 10.19 (79) v Lefroy 5.9 (39) – Att: 110 at TCA Ground

=== Round 8 ===
(Saturday, 12 July 1941)

- North Hobart 14.17 (101) v Lefroy 9.11 (65) – Att: 1,000 at North Hobart Oval
- Cananore 13.17 (95) v New Town 13.16 (94) – Att: 600 (approx) at TCA Ground

=== Round 9 ===
(Saturday, 26 July 1941)

- North Hobart 7.15 (57) v New Town 4.10 (34) – Att: 1,200 (approx) at North Hobart Oval
- Cananore 14.17 (101) v Lefroy 13.18 (96) – Att: 550 at TCA Ground

=== Round 10 ===
(Saturday, 2 August 1941)

- New Town 9.10 (64) v Lefroy 5.19 (49) – Att: 740 at North Hobart Oval
- North Hobart 17.14 (116) v Cananore 12.17 (89) – Att: 1,300 at TCA Ground

=== Round 11 ===
(Saturday, 9 August 1941)

- Cananore 18.8 (116) v New Town 12.16 (88) – Att: 966 at North Hobart Oval
- North Hobart 16.16 (112) v Lefroy 13.10 (88) – Att: 690 at TCA Ground

=== Round 12 ===
(Saturday, 16 August 1941)

- Cananore 13.19 (97) v Lefroy 9.12 (66) – Att: 1,000 at North Hobart Oval
- New Town 15.13 (103) v North Hobart 12.14 (86) – Att: 800 (approx) at TCA Ground

=== Round 13 ===
(Saturday, 23 August 1941)

- North Hobart 11.17 (83) v Cananore 9.12 (66) – Att: 1,600 (approx) at North Hobart Oval
- New Town 23.16 (154) v Lefroy 12.9 (81) – Att: 511 at TCA Ground*

Note: Alf Sampson (New Town) kicked a TANFL record of 15 goals in this match, also a record 8 goals in the 4th Quarter.

=== Round 14 ===
(Saturday, 30 August 1941)

- North Hobart 18.21 (129) v Lefroy 14.13 (97) – Att: 2,101 at North Hobart Oval (Double-Header)*
- New Town 12.7 (79) v Cananore 10.7 (67) – Att: 2,101 at North Hobart Oval (Double-Header)

Note: This match was Lefroy Football Club's final TANFL match.

=== Round 15 ===
(Saturday, 6 September 1941) Since the final ladder positions had been determined after round 14, the league cancelled round 15 and played a patriotic lightning football event instead.

=== Semi-final ===
(Saturday, 13 September 1941)

- Cananore: 2.7 (19) | 6.9 (45) | 12.11 (83) | 15.13 (103)
- New Town: 3.2 (20) | 8.7 (55) | 8.11 (59) | 11.12 (78)
- Attendance: 2,900 at North Hobart Oval

=== Final ===
(Saturday, 20 September 1941)

- North Hobart: 3.1 (19) | 6.7 (43) | 7.13 (55) | 12.17 (89)
- Cananore: 4.2 (26) | 5.5 (35) | 8.9 (57) | 9.11 (65)
- Attendance: 4,034 at North Hobart Oval*

Note: This was Cananore Football Club's final TANFL match.

North Hobart, as the club with the most wins, would have had the right of challenge to a grand final had Cananore won the match.
