= Oliver O'Halloran =

Australian aviator

- Born: Oliver John Flinn O'Halloran; 28 April 2000 (age 26); Hobart, Tasmania, Australia
- Other name: Ollie
- Education: Guilford Young College; The Friends' School, Hobart; St Virgils College
- Known for: Youngest person to fly solo around Australia (17 years, 1 month, 7 days)
- Aviation career
- Flight license: 1 May 2017
- Website: www.solo17.com.au

Oliver John Flinn O'Halloran (born 28 April 2000) is an Australian aviator living in Hobart, Tasmania. He is best known for his solo flight around Australia which previously made him the youngest person to circumnavigate Australia, solo and unassisted, which he did in a bid to encourage others to pursue ambitious dreams and promote aviation to youths. O'Halloran began flying in late 2014, but had to wait till he was 17 years of age to attempt the record due to Civil Aviation Safety Authority regulations.

== Biography ==
Born and raised in Hobart, Tasmania, O'Halloran took an interest in aviation from a young age. He attended The Friends' School, Hobart until early high school and then moved to St Virgil's College. As of 2017 he was in Year 12 at Guilford Young College.

== Australian circumnavigation ==
O'Halloran departed Cambridge Aerodrome on 14 May 2017 at 11:02 AEST. When he finished the circumnavigation, he had stopped at 40 locations and covered over 15,000 km. O'Halloran arrived back at his starting place on 3 June 2017 at 11:23 AEST to secure the record by over 3 months from the previous known record.
