= Eric Zschech =

Australian rules footballer, born 1909

Personal information
- Full name: Eric Leslie Zschech
- Born: 19 June 1909; Minyip, Victoria
- Died: 3 October 1981 (aged 72); Parkville, Victoria
- Original team: Minyip
- Height: 174 cm (5 ft 9 in)
- Weight: 73 kg (161 lb)

Playing career^{1}
Years	Club	Games (Goals)
1930–1935	Richmond	102 (16)
- ^{1} Playing statistics correct to the end of 1935.

Career highlights
- 1928 Wimmera FL best & fairest; Richmond Premiership Player 1932, 1934; Interstate Games:- 1

Eric Leslie Zschech (19 June 1909 – 3 October 1981) was an Australian rules footballer who played in the Victorian Football League (VFL) between 1930 and 1935 for the Richmond Football Club. He formed part of the legendary Tiger centreline of Geddes, Zschech and Judkins who played in four Grand Finals in a row from 1931 to 1934.

Later crossing to Lefroy Football Club in the TANFL where he won the George Watt Medal for the league's best and fairest player in 1936, 1937 (tied with Len Pye) and 1939. During World War II the TANFL, along with the Lefroy Football Club, went into recess. Upon the resumption in 1945 district football was initiated and Lefroy being a city based Club with no defined geographical zone was not accepted. Subsequently, Sandy Bay Football Club was formed drawing strongly from the old Lefroy Blues player and administrative base, including Eric Zschech who was a member of their inaugural senior premiership in 1946.

== Links ==
- Eric Zschech Profile via Tigerland Archive
