= Adam Coote =

Australian football umpire

Adam Coote is an Australian rules football boundary umpire and sprinter. He has umpired 383 games, including 31 final matches and five grand finals (2006, 2008, 2009, 2010, 2010R) since making his debut in the 2005 season. In 2006 he was awarded the Bill Sutton Medallion for the best first or second year AFL boundary umpire. He continued to build on that early success and was the All Australian boundary umpire in both the 2008 and 2009 seasons. He was also awarded the Murray Williams Shield in 2012 for his contribution to the AFLUA and umpiring. Coote has umpired the third highest number of AFL games for a boundary umpire.

Coote is from Pomborneit, near Camperdown in south-western Victoria.

Coote began umpiring with the Colac and District Football Umpires Association when he was 14. Australian Football League (AFL) umpires manager Jeff Gieschen has said that Coote is one of the most powerful boundary umpires in the AFL. Coote practised throw-ins with half a brick at his house to build his strength.

Coote completed a Bachelor of Applied Science (Exercise and Sport Science) at Deakin University in 2004. Coote was named the Victorian Runners and Trainers association Athlete of the Year for the 2009/10 season. This came after he won the 800-metre title at the Stawell Gift in 2010.

For the 2011 Stawell Gift, Coote switched from middle distance to sprinting to contest the more prestigious 120-metre sprint. He made the semi-finals, but came third and did not qualify for the final. In 2012 he again competed in the sprint, and despite umpiring an AFL game in Brisbane on the Thursday before, Coote won his heat and semi final before finishing third in the final. Coote again competed in the Stawell Gift in 2013, running second in his heat and earning a semi-final berth. He felt "flattened" from umpiring the Carlton vs Richmond game on the preceding Thursday. Coote was then scratched from the semi-final after tearing his hamstring in the warm up.

Coote returned to professional sprinting for the 2013/2014 season, recording a very narrow loss in the SAAL Bay Sheffield final on 28 December 2013 won by Queensland beach sprinter Ben Mispelhorn. Coote then ventured to Tasmania for the Burnie Gift on New Year's Day. He excelled in the wet and windy conditions, winning by 3 metres, the biggest winning margin in recent times, in a time of 12.78 seconds from his 9.50m handicap.
