= Samuel Clemes =

Samuel Clemes (25 December 1845 – 25 October 1922) was an English educationist who in 1887 established The Friends' School, Hobart for the Society of Friends (Quakers). In 1920 he established another, Leslie House School which, renamed Clemes College, was operated by his son William Hall Clemes until 1945, after which the two schools were united.

== History ==
Clemes was born in Liskeard, Cornwall, a son of Samuel Clemes and his wife Jane Clemes, née Willis. He was educated in England, mostly at Friends' schools, such as Sidcot. He trained as a teacher, later volunteering for the Friends' mission in Madagascar. After ten years he returned to teaching as principal of the Friends' School in Wigton, England. In 1886 he was sent by the Society of Friends to Australia to establish a boys' school in Hobart, Tasmania, and was its first principal and science master. In 1887 the school opened in Warwick Street, not far from Trinity Church. He also gave regular public lectures on technical and scientific subjects, which were popular. His wife taught taught French and German. In 1888 the School purchased the property "Hobartville", off Commercial Road, to which the school moved and became co-educational, renamed Friends' High School.

The Clemes resigned from the Friends School in 1900 and founded Leslie House School at the corner of Pirie Street and Main Road, New Town. Sydney R. Dickinson married Margaret Clemes in 1907, became co-principal in 1910, left for New Zealand in 1915, became principal of Haileybury 1923–1941; died 1 April 1949).

Clemes died in 1922, still actively involved with the school, which in 1923 was renamed Clemes College in his honour. In 1945 The board of governors of Friends' School purchased Clemes College and announced that as from 1946 the two well-known Hobart schools would amalgamate.

== Family ==
Clemes married Susannah Hall sometime around 1871 before leaving as missionary teachers to Tananarive, Madagascar. She died shortly after their return to England in 1882. In 1884 he married again, to Susannah's sister Margaret Hall. Their family includes:

- (Isabella) Mary Clemes (c. 1874 – 10 April 1934) married Marcus Rufus Shoobridge in April 1910.
- Margaret Clemes married Sydney R. Dickinson in 1907
- William Hall Clemes (1877–1953) was born at Antananarivo, Madagascar. He was educated at Brookfield School, England, and Friends' School, Hobart. He succeeded his father as principal of Leslie House School, and retired at the end of 1945.
- Alfred Willis Clemes (c. 1887 – ), Rhodes Scholar 1908. He captained Oxford in the first Australian rules football match against Cambridge in 1911, which Oxford won. He served with the Friends Ambulance Unit during WWI.

His sister, Isabella J. Clemes (c. 1848 – 24 January 1903) was a lecturer in mathematics at Friends' School and Leslie House. She was earlier an employee of the Royal Observatory, Greenwich.
