= Burnie Gift =

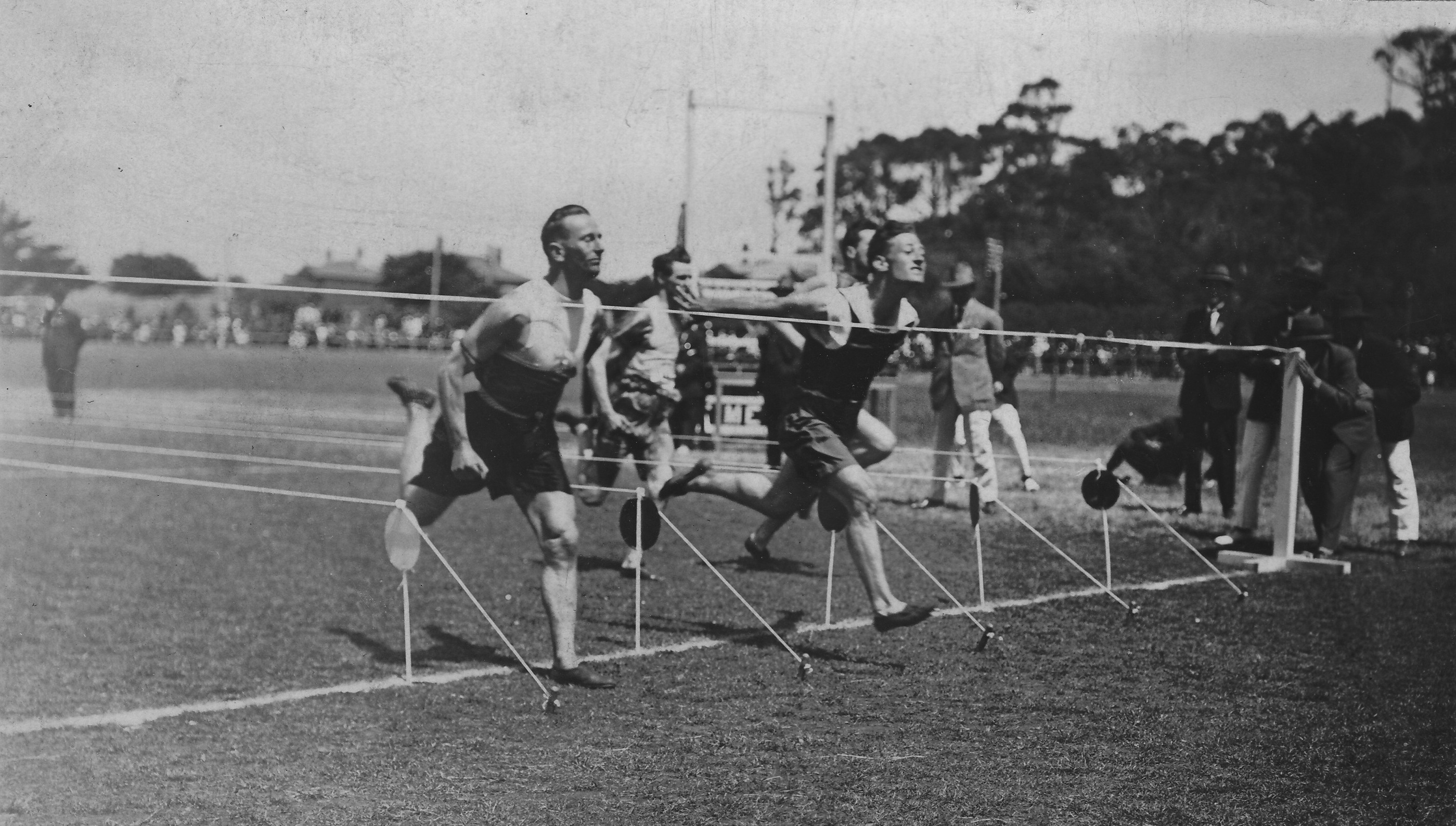
E.R. Terry of Pyengana (11 yds), wins the 1925 Burnie Gift in 13 secs from A.M. Stuart (Hobart), M. Campbell (Devonport), and G.F. Triffett (Queenstown)

The Burnie Gift is a professional footrace held in Burnie, Tasmania during an annual sports carnival, held on a grass track at West Park Oval on New Year's Eve. It is conducted by the Tasmanian Athletic League in conjunction with the Burnie Athletic Club. The Burnie Gift is a sprint event conducted over the traditional 'Gift' distance of 120 metres.

Athletes are allocated handicaps with a range from scratch (running the full 120 metres) to the current limit of 12.00 metres. An athlete off 12.00m would run 108 metres. Most athletes (and winners) run from a handicap between 5.0m and 10.0m, thereby covering anywhere from 115m to 110m. Handicaps are assigned by a panel based on an assessment of each athlete’s track performances. Athletes are separated by lane ropes as opposed to painted lanes on synthetic tracks. The finish line is a finishing gate that each athlete must run through to record a time.

The Burnie Carnival is the premier running carnival in Tasmania and is considered one of the 'big three' professional Gifts in Australia along with Victoria's Stawell Gift and the Bay Sheffield in South Australia. Along with the feature event, the Burnie carnival includes races over 90m, 400m and 1600m. The Burnie carnival is one of three Tasmanian Christmas Carnivals conducted over a seven-day period from 26 December to 1 January. The other carnivals are held at Latrobe and Devonport.

== History ==
First run in 1885, it was initially held as the Sheffield Handicap and was renamed to Burnie Gift for the 1908 event. The carnival was traditionally held on New Year's Day, but switched to New Year's Eve in 2019. Two carnivals were held in 2019. The distance was originally 130 yards, and switched to 120 metres in 1973. The Women's Gift was introduced in 1995, although was known for the first few years as the Women's 120m Handicap.

Dean Capobianco (1991) was the first athlete to win the race off scratch (running the full 120 metres). Joshua Ross (2004 and 2007) is the only man to have won the Gift twice off the scratch mark. Capobianco and Ross are the only national 100m champions to have won the Gift.

In 2018, Hobart sprinter Jack Hale was given an unprecedented handicap of -1 metres, giving him 121 metres to run.

== Winners ==
Year	Men's Burnie Gift	Women's Burnie Gift
2025	Hamish Lindstrom	Ebony Newton
2024	Logan James	Kayedel Smith
2023	Saye Morris	Mia Spencer
2022	Jesse McKenna	Torrie Lewis
2021	Ryan Tarrant	Kysha Praciak
2020	Aaron Leferink VIC	Hana Basic VIC
2019	Abdoulie Asim GAMBIA	Morgan Gaffney TAS
2019	Ash Moloney QLD	Bec Kovacic TAS
2018	Daniel Reeves TAS	Kiani Allen TAS
2017	Jorden Englund TAS	Morgan Gaffney TAS
2016	John Howe TAS	Lilly Castle TAS
2015	Simon Fitzpatrick VIC	Kimberley Geelan TAS
2014	Adam Coote VIC	Cara Boustead VIC
2013	Jacob Despard TAS	Morgan Gaffney TAS
2012	Brendan Cole ACT	Laura-Jane Hilditch VIC
2011	Robbie James SA	Morgan Gaffney TAS
2010	Ollie Wurm VIC	Sandy Loring TAS
2009	Clay Watkins SA	Alicia Wrench-Doody SA
2008	Duncan Tippins SA	Olivia Mills TAS
2007	Joshua Ross NSW	Melissa Kay TAS
2006	Cameron Yorke WA	Katie Moore VIC
2005	Luke Whitney TAS	Megan Hines NSW
2004	Joshua Ross NSW	Madelin Poke TAS
2003	Carnival abandoned due to rain	
2002	Darren Rogers WA	Anne-Marie Mouri-Nkeng CAMEROON
2001	Craig Brown VIC	Tamika Johnston TAS
2000	Matt Stevenson TAS	Melissa Kay TAS
1999	Simon Bresnehan TAS	Emma Marshall TAS
1998	Shaun Turale TAS	Kasey Kuusisalo TAS
1997	Paul Pearce VIC	Emma Marshall TAS
1996	David Downie TAS	Lauren Hewitt VIC
1995	Paul Slupecki VIC	Donna Collins NSW
1994	Shane Hearn WA	
1993	Simon Bresnehan TAS	
1992	Todd Ireland VIC	
1991	Dean Capobianco WA	
1990	Robert Kirsopp VIC	
1989	John Riggs TAS	
1988	Anthony Grima VIC	
1987	Frank Corsello VIC	
1986	Mark Hipworth VIC	
1985	Wayne Johncock TAS	
1984	Gary Wescombe TAS	
1983	Lee Berwick TAS	
1982	Michael Geary TAS	
1981	Neil King VIC	
1980	Gary French TAS	
1979	Ian Hagger VIC	
1978	Gary Wescombe TAS	
1977	Steve Roach TAS	
1976	Kevin Portch NSW	
1975	Gerard Thompson TAS	
1974	John Mowat VIC	
1973	Max Seymour TAS	
1972	Ralph Heffernan TAS	
1971	Barry Poulter NSW	
1970	Kerry Badcock TAS	
1968	Phillip Lincoln TAS	
1929	Len Bugg TAS	
1928	Len Bugg TAS	
