= Fred Pringle =

Australian rules footballer

Personal information
- Full name: Frederick Neville Pringle
- Born: 22 December 1899; Assam, British India
- Died: 12 November 1982 (aged 82); Sandy Bay, Tasmania, Australia
- Height: 180 cm (5 ft 11 in)
- Weight: 83 kg (183 lb)
- Positions: Ruck, Key Position

Playing career^{1}
Years	Club	Games (Goals)
1915	Cananore (TFL)	
1920–1922	Cananore (TFL)	
1923–1924	Carlton (VFL)	22 (7)
1925–1928	Cananore	
- ^{1} Playing statistics correct to the end of 1928.

Frederick Neville Pringle (22 December 1899 – 12 November 1982) was an Australian rules footballer who played for Cananore in the Tasmanian Football League (TFL) and Carlton in the Victorian Football League (VFL) during the 1920s.

== Family ==
The son of British parents, Charles Lowes Pringle (1868-1932), and May Gertrude Pringle, née Hewitt, Frederick Neville Pringle was born in Assam, India on 22 December 1899.

He married Berenice Margaret Berkery (1906-1945) in 1929.

== Pre-war football ==
Pringle was brought up in Tasmania where he played football with Cananore. Just 15 years of age when he debuted in 1915, he had to wait until 1920 to play again, due to the suspension of the competition during the war.

== Military service ==
He served as a gunner in the 10th Field Artillery Brigade of the First AIF during World War I.

== Post-war football ==
A ruckman who was at times used as a key position player, he had a two-season stint at Carlton, beginning in 1923, which impressed the state selectors enough to see him represent the VFL.

When Pringle resumed playing at Cananore in 1925 it was as captain-coach and he promptly steered them to three successive premierships. To highlight the strength of this Cananore side, they played a challenge match in 1925 against South Australian Football League club Port Adelaide and won by 178 points. He played his last TFL season in 1928 and then retired, having represented Tasmania in six interstate matches, most recent of which was the 1927 Melbourne Carnival.

== Death ==
He died at Sandy Bay, Tasmania on 12 November 1982.

== Tasmanian Football Hall of Fame ==
In 2005 he was honoured as one of the inaugural inductees into the Tasmanian Football Hall of Fame.

== See also ==
- 1924 Hobart Carnival
- 1927 Melbourne Carnival
