= Len Metherell =

Australian rules footballer (1908–1992)

Personal information
- Full name: William Leonard Metherell
- Born: 17 November 1908; Boulder, Western Australia
- Died: 30 October 1992 (aged 83); Queensland
- Original team: Subiaco (WAFL)
- Height: 183 cm (6 ft 0 in)
- Weight: 92 kg (203 lb)

Playing career^{1}
Years	Club	Games (Goals)
1927–29	Subiaco (WAFL)	45
1930–1936	Geelong	110 (117)

Coaching career
Years	Club	Games (W–L–D)
1941	Geelong	18 (3–15–0)
- ^{1} Playing statistics correct to the end of 1936.

William Leonard Metherell (17 November 1908 – 30 October 1992) was an Australian rules footballer who played with Geelong in the VFL during the 1930s.

Metherell started his career in 1927 at Western Australian club Subiaco and topped their goalkicking with 49 goals. He went on to play 45 games for the club before transferring to Geelong.

In his debut season for Geelong he played in a losing Grand Final and in the following year, 1931, he was a member of Geelong's premiership side. Mostly a support ruckman, Metherell also rested a lot in defence and was joined by his younger brother Jack in 1932. He liked to crash through packs and was a regular exponent of the drop punt. Metherell polled well in the 1935 Brownlow Medal, finishing equal ninth.

He was coach of Geelong in the 1941 VFL season but could manage only three wins.

Len was also an outstanding cricketer. He made 24 centuries between 1930-41 compiling 5465 runs at 66.6 in the Geelong Cricket Association. He was named in the G.C.A. Team Of The Century.
