= Jack Gardiner =

Australian rules footballer, coach and umpire

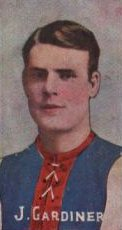

Personal information
- Full name: John Carlton Gardiner
- Born: 8 May 1881; Carlton, Victoria
- Died: 3 April 1967 (aged 85); Hobart, Tasmania
- Original team: St Juke's
- Position: Rover

Playing career^{1}
Years	Club	Games (Goals)
1901–1902	Carlton	16 (5)
1903–1908	Melbourne	70 (54)
1909–1923	Cananore (TFL)	
1924–1925	North Hobart (TFL)	
Total		86 (59)
- ^{1} Playing statistics correct to the end of 1908.

John Carlton Gardiner (8 May 1881 – 3 April 1967) was an Australian rules footballer who played for Carlton and Melbourne in the Victorian Football League (VFL). He then became a successful coach in the Tasmanian Football League.

== Family ==
The son of John Gardiner, and Anna Gardiner, née Sidley, John Carlton Gardiner was born on 8 May 1881. Jack Gardiner was the third of four children in the family, with two older sisters and a younger brother, Vin Gardiner.

He married Florence Bucirde (1883–1946), in Hobart, on 20 November 1911.

Jack Gardiner died in Hobart in 1967, and is buried at Cornelian Bay Cemetery.

== Football ==
Gardiner came from a football playing family with his father, John, a Carlton player during the 1870s. Vin Gardiner, his younger brother, also played at both Melbourne and Carlton.

His VFL career, spent mostly as a rover, began with two seasons at his father's club before switching to Melbourne in 1903. He kicked 24 goals in 1904 and was a regular in the Melbourne side until 1907.

The rover spent the 1908 season in Tasmania, as an umpire and coach of the TFL representative team. He returned to the mainland to coach Tasmania at the 1908 Melbourne Carnival and stopped umpiring after that year.

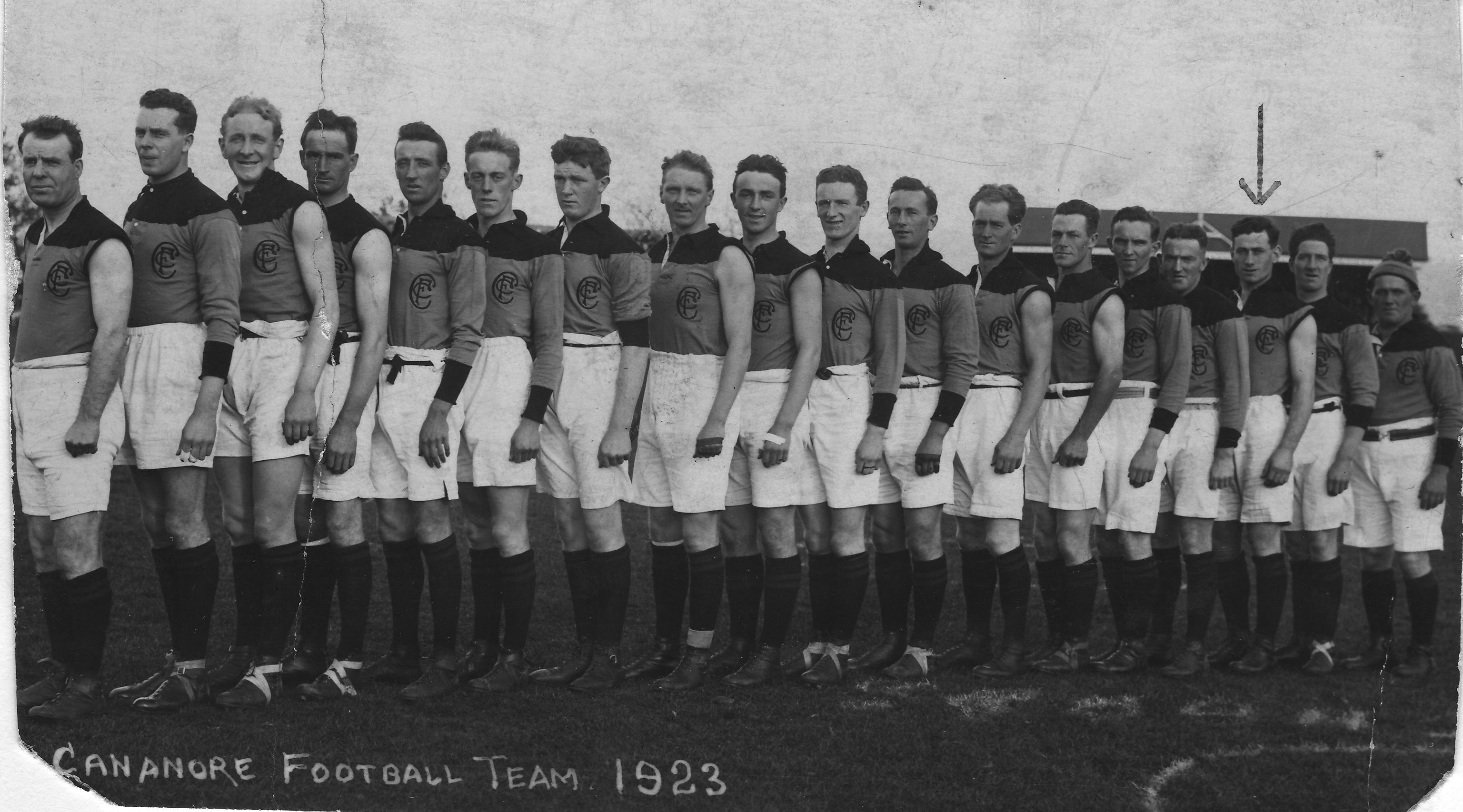
The 1923 Cananore team. Jack Gardiner, the captain-coach (then aged 42), is at the far left.

He resumed his playing career in 1909 when he joined Cananore as captain. His tenure included four TFL premierships, including three in a row from 1909 to 1911. Gardiner also captained the state at the 1911 Adelaide Carnival. Appointed Cananore captain-coach following the war, he steered them to more premierships in 1921 and 1922. His final port of call was North Hobart, with which he spent the 1924 and 1925 seasons at before retiring.

In 2005, Gardiner was one of the inaugural inductees into the Tasmanian Football Hall of Fame.

His son, Jack Jr, also played football and represented Tasmania as the state wicket-keeper in cricket.

== See also ==
- 1908 Melbourne Carnival
- 1911 Adelaide Carnival
