= Scott Powers =

American physiologist

Scott Powers is an American physiologist, focusing on investigating the effects of muscular exercise and inactivity on both cardiac and skeletal muscle. He is currently the UAA Endowed Professor at University of Florida.
