= The Friends' School, Hobart =

The Friends' School

Location
- North Hobart, Tasmania; Australia; 42°52′8″S 147°18′46″E

Information
- Type: Independent, co-educational, day & boarding school
- Motto: Nemo Sibi Nasciturs (No one is born for self alone)
- Established: 1887
- Principal: Esther Hill
- Employees: ~200
- Enrolment: ~1,310 (PK–12)
- Colours: Blue, red & grey
- Affiliation: Sports Association of Tasmanian Independent Schools
- Website: friends.tas.edu.au

The Friends' School, Hobart is an independent co-educational Quaker day and boarding school located in North Hobart, Tasmania, Australia.

Founded in 1887 by Quakers, the school caters for approximately 1330 students from pre-kindergarten to Year 12, including 47 boarders from Years 7 to 12. It is the second largest Quaker school in the world.

Friends' is affiliated with the Association of Independent Schools of Tasmania (AIST), the Junior School Heads Association of Australia (JSHAA), the Association of Heads of Independent Schools of Australia (AHISA), the Australian Boarding Schools' Association (ABSA), and is a member of the Sports Association of Tasmanian Independent Schools (SATIS).

== History ==
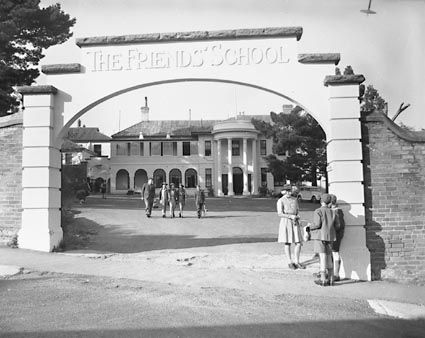
The Friends' School entrance and buildings, 1948.

The Friends' School opened at 60–62 Warwick Street, Hobart (the building still stands) on 31 January 1887 under the control of the Religious Society of Friends (Quakers). It was opened by Samuel Clemes. The initial enrolment of 33 expanded so rapidly that the School moved to its present site in Commercial Road on 28 January 1889, a move made possible by the generous loan of A$4,000 from Hobart Baptists. The first headmaster was Samuel Clemes, considered to be a remarkable reformer in education for his belief in co-education. In 1900 he resigned and set up his own family school, Leslie House, (later renamed Clemes College) in Pirie Street and then at Boa Vista, Argyle Street, where Morris Friends' Primary Years (Junior School) and Clemes (Years 11–12) are now located. Clemes College and The Friends' School came together in 1946.

1923 marked the beginning of a new era in the School's history. On 28 September, the control of the school passed from London Quakers to a committee in Hobart and a week later Ernest Unwin arrived, under whose leadership the School made remarkable progress. In this period the distinctive appearance of the School changed - with the addition of the front portico, the Hodgkin Hall, the original science and art block and the boys' boarding wing. No further building programmes were undertaken until 1955 when the second period of expansion began with the opening of the Preparatory School in 1955 followed by the Sports Ground in 1958. Building on the Commercial Road site began in 1962 with the opening of the Unwin Memorial Science and Art block, continued in the 70s with the Library, the Asten Theatre, additional science facilities and in the 80s with the W. N. Oats Sports Centre. The Clemes Memorial Library in the Junior School was erected from the old Clemes Assembly Hall in 1986. The addition of the multipurpose Farrall Centre to the Junior School was completed in late 2011.

Despite being a Quaker school, there are no more than ten Quaker staff at the school, and few of the students are actually Quakers. However Quaker activities, such as meeting for worship (Gathering), form an integral part of school life for students, and take up one hour per week.

=== Sherwood ===
Following the Tasman Bridge disaster of 1975 many students of the school who lived on the eastern shore of the Derwent River became isolated, and were unable to attend.

Whilst older students were trusted to make the ferry crossing from Bellerive to Hobart, for younger students it was not deemed safe to do so unsupervised. Appeals were made to the school from concerned parents, and eventually, it was decided to build a temporary campus within the City of Clarence. A site was located in bushland above Lindisfarne and a small area was set aside for the campus.

The Sherwood campus consisted of two main inter-linked buildings, a playground, a crude gravel oval and a large area of undeveloped bushland. The school only catered for pupils from kindergarten to grade 2, as it was considered older pupils were old enough to catch transport to the main campus.

One of the features of the education system at Sherwood was the regular "nature walks" in which students from every year group would participate in regular excursions into the nearby sclerophyll bushland and learn to understand, appreciate, and get in better touch with nature.

It closed just a few years after opening.

== Principals ==
Complete list of School Principals:

Period	Details
1887–1900	Samuel Clemes
1901–1903	Edmund Gower
1903–1907	J. Edgar Smith
July 1907 – July 1908	Godfrey Williams
July 1908 – 1915	Edmund Gower
1915–1922	Charles Annells
1923–1944	Ernest Unwin
September 1944 – May 1945	Stuart Hickman (Acting)
1945–1973	William Oats
1974–1980	Roderic Grosvenor
1980–1988	Michael Bailey, Joint Principal with Margaret Bailey
1980–1988	Margaret Bailey, Joint Principal with Michael Bailey
1989–2000	Stephanie Farrall, Co-Principal with Lyndsay Farrall
1989–2000	Lyndsay Farrall, Co-Principal with Stephanie Farrall
2000–2002	Lyndsay Farrall
2003–2012	John Green
2013–2023	Nelson File
2024–	Esther Hill

== Structure ==
The Friends' School consists of three main parts: Primary School, Middle School and Senior School. The Primary School has approximately 442 students from Kindergarten to Year 6 and is situated in the Argyle Street Campus. The Middle School has 288 students in Year 7 and Year 8 and is also on the Argyle Street campus. The Senior School has approximately 580 students in Years 9 to 12 and is on the Commercial Road campus.

The school owns a sports complex at Bell Street, with facilities for AFL, cricket, hockey, softball, and soccer; Friends' Health and Fitness off Elizabeth Street; and Friends' Early Learning on Argyle Street. The school has a state-of-the-art rowing facility in Lutana, near the main campuses.

For class allocation and internal competition, all students at Friends' are assigned to "Houses". From Kindergarten to Year 12, the Houses are Mather, Ransome, Unwin, and Hodgkin.

All students in the Senior School are members of tutor groups, each of which consists of approximately four people from each grade. All members of a tutor group are from the same house, and each house has eight tutor groups.

Students in the Middle School are in class groups, with students in each class undertaking a range of learning subjects and activities together.

== Sport ==
The Friends' School is a member of the Sports Association of Tasmanian Independent Schools (SATIS).

=== SATIS premierships ===
The Friends' School has won the following SATIS premierships.

- Cross Country (3) – 1963, 1964, 2006, 2013, 2014, 2015, 2017, 2018, 2019, 2021
- Hockey (15) – 1965, 1968, 1969, 1970, 1971, 1975, 1996, 2000, 2006, 2007, 2008, 2010, 2011, 2012, 2013
- Rowing (6) – 1999, 2000, 2001, 2002, 2009, 2019
- Rowing Eight (14) – 1932, 1933, 1939, 1949, 1950, 1958, 1959, 1960, 1961, 1962, 1968, 1975, 2001, 2003
- Soccer (2) – 2004, 2010
- Swimming – 2004
- Tennis (2) – 2014, 2018

== Notable alumni ==
- Dora Isabel Baudinet (1883–1945) nurse and philanthropist
- Paul Calvert – Politician
- Elizabeth Robyn Mason – Director of the Australasian Medical Publishing Company Pty Ltd (also attended the Presbyterian Ladies' College, Melbourne)
- Oliver O'Halloran – The youngest person to fly around Australia solo and unassisted. (2017)
- Edmund Leolin Piesse – Director of Military Intelligence 1916–1919 and Head of the Pacific Branch of the Prime Minister's Department 1919–1923
- Kim Santow – New South Wales Supreme Court judge and Chancellor of the University of Sydney
- Jon Kudelka – National editorial cartoonist, regularly appearing in The Australian.
- Martin Bryant – Murdered 35 people in the Port Arthur massacre.

=== Entertainment and the arts ===
- Errol Flynn – Hollywood actor
- Amali Ward – Australian Idol contestant/singer
- Freya Stafford – Actress
- Christopher Koch – Writer
- Dennis Altman – Academic and writer
- Danielle Wood – Journalist, writer, and academic

=== Sport ===
- Samuel Beltz – Olympic & world champion rower
- Caryn Davies – Olympic rower & two-time Olympic Champion
- Kerry Hore – Olympic & world champion rower
- Kate Hornsey – Olympic rower
- Meaghan Volker – Olympic rower
- Erik Rowan – World champion rower
- Eddie Ockenden – National Hockey Player
- Max Walker – Cricketer and Australian footballer
- Hanny Allston – World Champion Orienteer
- Mathew Goggin - Professional Golfer

== See also ==
- List of schools in Tasmania
- List of boarding schools
- Education in Tasmania
