= Horrie Gorringe =

Australian rules footballer (1895–1994)

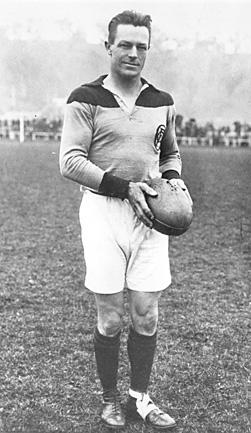
- Gorringe with the Cananore FC

Personal information
- Full name: Horace Charles Gorringe
- Born: 4 July 1895; Sandford, Tasmania
- Died: 17 July 1994 (aged 99); Cygnet, Tasmania
- Original team: Brighton Rovers
- Debut: 25 April 1914, Cananore vs. North Hobart, at TCA Ground
- Height: 172 cm (5 ft 8 in)
- Weight: 73 kg (161 lb)

Playing career
Years	Club	Games (Goals)
1914–1930	Cananore	

Career highlights
- Player of the Carnival, 1924 Hobart Carnival; 5 time Cananore premiership player; Named as a forward pocket in the Tasmanian Team of the Century in 2004; Inducted as an Icon of the Tasmanian Football Hall of Fame in 2005; Inducted into the Australian Football Hall of Fame in 2011

Horace Charles Gorringe (4 July 1895 – 17 July 1994) was an Australian rules football player in Tasmania, who is considered to have been one of the greatest rovers in the game's history.

== Family ==
The son of Lowther Gorringe (1864–1927), and Evelyn Sophia Gorringe (1868–1954), née Watson, Horace Charles Gorringe was born on 4 July 1895 at Sandford, Tasmania.

He married Myra Muriel Newnham (1899–1992) on 7 February 1929.

== Football ==
HORRIE GORRINGE

An Acrostic
Great little player in a class of his own,
Our little rover he stands out alone.
Right wonderful judgment in midst of the mill;
Rarely they catch him to send him a spill.
In a close finish he is just grand;
Now they are roaring from the grandstand;
Gorringe, they yell, look out, you backs,
Even now there's a chance for the Yellow and Blacks.
"One of the Canaries" (1922)

=== Brighton Rovers ===
In 1912 and 1913 he was playing along with his brother, Eric Lowther John Gorringe (1893–1970), for the Brighton Rovers.

=== Cananore (TFL) ===
Gorringe played for the Cananore club in the Tasmanian Football League between the years 1914 and 1930.

He was Club Champion in 1928, winning the Most Consistent award.

He played numerous matches at representative level for both the league and the state—in a war interrupted career (no TFL competition in 1916, 1917, and 1918), he played in 157 club games for Cananore, and in 35 combined games, and represented Tasmania in the 1924 and 1927 carnivals—including the match in Adelaide, when the TFL representative team beat South Australia, in Adelaide, on 21 July 1923.

"In his playing days Gorringe used to practise his celebrated stab kick by aiming at the open top half of a stable door at his farm at Tea Tree, a few miles from Hobart. He could do it nine times out of ten with either foot from 30 yards.
"On Saturday [6 June 1925, when I was the central field umpire in the match in the match between Cananore and New Town] I saw [Gorringe] do what I've I've never seen another footballer do in my life, and that is to change his direction left and right practically in one stride. I've seen rovers who could swerve to the right, run a few strides, and then swerve to the left again, but very very few, yet Gorringe can left and then right turn with only one stride in between each action. It makes him extremely elusive. Ia addition to handling and kicking the ball like a champion, lie impressed me as being an ideal opponent." – eminent South Australia umpire, Charles Robert O'Connor (1873–1961).
"Frank Maher, Essendon's skipper and first-class rover, considers that Horrie Gorringe, the Tasmanian, is the best rover seen in Melbourne for many a long day. "He is a beauty all right", said Maher. "Why. he is as slippery as an eel, a beautiful pass, and uncanny in his Judgment. On a running shot he is phenomenally accurate, while elsewhere his play stamps him as Australia's best rover. An amazing thing about Gorringe, however, is that on a deliberate shot he is not at all accurate." – The Sporting Globe, 7 September 1927.
"Running Backward There Is another rather rare method of obtaining a clean breakaway It is to step backward. It is the last thing opponents expect you to do, and it is a very difficult feat to accomplish. But many of the finer points of football are difficult until you learn them. Alan la Fontaine, of Melbourne, is able to run backward comfortably and I once knew a player in Tasmania, named Horrie Gorringe, who could run backward out of a pack just as fast as he ran into it." – Ivor Warne-Smith, 1937.

== Death ==
He died on 17 July 1994, aged 99.

== Recognition ==
=== Horrie Gorringe Medal ===
The "Horrie Gorringe Medal" was between 2002 and 2005 a brief replacement of the William Leitch Medal for the best and fairest footballer in Tasmania.

=== Tasmanian Football Team of the Century ===
In 2004, he was selected as forward-pocket/rover in the Tasmanian Football Team of the Century.

=== Tasmanian Football Hall of Fame ===
In 2005, he was inducted, as one of the three inaugural "icons", into the Tasmanian Football Hall of Fame.

=== Australian Football Hall of Fame ===
Gorringe was inducted into the Australian Football Hall of Fame in 2011. He was the first and (as of 2014) only player who played his entire career in Tasmania to have been so inducted.

== See also ==
- 1927 Melbourne Carnival
