= Len Pye =

Australian rules footballer

Personal information
- Full name: Leonard Edward Thomas Pye
- Born: 21 February 1911; New Norfolk, Tasmania
- Died: 20 September 1989 (aged 78)
- Original team: North Hobart
- Height: 183 cm (6 ft 0 in)
- Weight: 80 kg (176 lb)

Playing career^{1}
Years	Club	Games (Goals)
1929–33; 1936–40	North Hobart	
1934–35	Fitzroy	16 (39)
1935	Northcote (VFA)	16 (34)
- ^{1} Playing statistics correct to the end of 1935.

Leonard Edward Thomas 'Apples' Pye (21 February 1911 – 20 September 1989) was an Australian rules footballer who played for Fitzroy in the VFL during the 1930s. He also had a notable career in the TANFL with North Hobart which saw him named in Tasmania's official 'Team of the Century', on the interchange bench.

== Family ==
The son of Charles Pye (1882–1958) and Elsie May Pye, née Burke (1884–1944), Leonard Edward Thomas Pye was born at New Norfolk on 21 February 1911. Len married Violet Beatrice Sullivan and had two daughters, Jennifer and Geraldine

== Football ==
=== North Hobart ===
Pye played his early football with New Norfolk before starting his North Hobart career in 1929. Strong in the air, Pye often played the role of an on-baller. He won a William Leitch Medal in 1932 and in doing so became the first player from his club to win it. The previous year he won the first of his four North Hobart 'Best and Fairest' awards, with the others coming in consecutive seasons from 1936 to 1938.

=== Fitzroy ===
His performance for Tasmania at the 1933 Sydney Carnival helped him get recruited by Fitzroy. He topped Fitzroy's goalkicking with 39 goals in 1934, his debut season, including a bag of eight against North Melbourne at Arden Street.

=== Northcote ===
After a single senior appearance for Fitzroy early in 1935 he moved to Northcote in the Victorian Football Association where he played 16 further games that season.

=== Return to North Hobart ===
In 1936 Pye returned to North Hobart and was a member of their 1936 premiership winning side to go with his previous premierships in 1929 and 1932. He was voted 'Best on Ground' in the 1936 decider, as well as the Grand Final the subsequent year which they lost. Two further premierships followed and he finished his career as a five time TANFL premiership player and with three Tasmanian State Premierships. From 1935 to 1941 the league didn't award a Leitch Medal, instead handing out the George Watt Memorial Medal to the season's best player, which was won by Pye in both 1937 and 1938.

After not playing during the war he returned for another stint at North Hobart in 1946. The following year he decided to join New Norfolk for their inaugural TFL season and he spent two years with the club before retiring.

== War service ==
Pye served in the Australian Army during World War II, enlisting in both 1940 and then again in 1943 when he was discharged after injuring his knee while on duty.
