= Jack Metherell =

Australian rules footballer (1912–1992)

Personal information
- Full name: Jack Rogers Metherell
- Born: 9 November 1912; Boulder, Western Australia
- Died: 30 November 1992 (aged 80); Hawthorn, Victoria
- Original team: Subiaco (WANFL)
- Height: 178 cm (5 ft 10 in)
- Weight: 80 kg (176 lb)

Playing career^{1}
Years	Club	Games (Goals)
1932–1937	Geelong	65 (221)
- ^{1} Playing statistics correct to the end of 1937.

Jack Rogers Metherell (9 November 1912 – 30 November 1992) was an Australian rules footballer who played with Geelong in the VFL during the 1930s. He was the younger brother of teammate Len Metherell.

Metherell came to Geelong from Western Australia and made his league debut in 1932. A half forward for most of his career, he topped Geelong's goalkicking in 1934, 1936 and 1937. His tally of 71 goals in 1937 saw him finish one short of Gordon Coventry who topped the league. Metherell kicked four goals in that year's grand final and helped the Cats to their third flag, and his first.

It was his final game in the league and in 1938 he went on to become a successful coach in the TANFL with North Hobart and also for Tasmania at interstate football. Geelong refused him a clearance so he stood out of playing. He coached from the sidelines. After standing out for a year Metherell topped the TANFL's goal kicking list in 1939, 1940 and 1941.

Metherell served in the Australian Army for two year from 1943.

When play resumed in 1945 Metherell who continued as both player and coach. In 1946 he captain-coached Cooee, for one season. He returned to North Hobart, where he enjoyed one last year as a player before continuing as coach in an off-field capacity.
