= List of Tasmanian Football League premiers =

This is a list of premiership winners in the Tasmanian Football League.

== TFL grand finals (1879–2024) ==
Below is the complete list of champions since the first edition held by then "Tasmanian Football Association" (TFA) in 1879.

Year	Premier	Score	Runner-up	Attend.	Venue
1879	City (Note: Declared premier) (1)	(No final played)			
1880	Cricketers (1)	(No final played)			
1881	Railway (1)	(No final played)			
1882	Railway (2)	6 – 0	Cricketers		
1883	Railway (3)	(No final played)			
1884	Cricketers (2)	(No final played)			
1885	Holebrook (1)	5 – 3	City	n/a	n/a
1886	City (2)	6.16 – 0.9	Railway	n/a	n/a
1887	Railway (4)	5.3 – 1.9	City	n/a	n/a
1888	City (3)	4.15 – 3.6	Railway	n/a	n/a
1889	Railway (5)	(No final played)			
1890	Holebrook (2)	3.11 – 2.7	Railway		
1891	Holebrook (3)	(No final played)			
1892	City (4)	(No final played)			
1893	Railway (6)	8.17 – 7.6	Holebrook	n/a	n/a
1894	Railway (7)	2.5 – 0.4	City	n/a	n/a
1895	Railway (8)	4.3 – 2.4	City	n/a	n/a
1896	Railway (9)	(No final played)			
1897	(City) (5)	1.3 (9) – 0.6 (6)	North Hobart	n/a	n/a
1898	Lefroy (1)	8.17 (65) – 3.5 (23)	Wellington	n/a	n/a
1899	Lefroy (2)	4.7 (31) – 2.8 (20)	Wellington	n/a	n/a
1900	Wellington (1)	7.8 (50) – 5.6 (36)	Lefroy	n/a	n/a
1901	Lefroy (3)	11.12 (78) – 3.8 (26)	Wellington	n/a	n/a
1902	North Hobart (1)	(No final played)			
1903	Wellington (2)	(No final played)			
1904	Wellington (3)	(No final played)			
1905	North Hobart (2)	(No final played)			
1906	Derwent (1)	(No final played)			
1907	Lefroy (4)	(No final played)			
1908	North Hobart (3)	2.7 (19) – 1.9 (15)	Lefroy	n/a	Upper Cricket Ground
1909	Cananore (1)	(No final played)			
1910	Cananore (2)	(No final played)			
1911	Cananore (3)	(No final played)			
1912	Lefroy (5)	(No final played)			
1913	Cananore (4)	(No final played)			
1914	North Hobart (4)	7.11 (53) – 4.11 (35)	Cananore	5,000	Upper Cricket Ground
1915	Lefroy (6)	6.12 (48) – 3.5 (23)	Cananore	n/a	Upper Cricket Ground
1916	(Suspended due to World War I)				
1917	(Suspended due to World War I)				
1918	(Suspended due to World War I)				
1919	(Suspended due to influenza epidemic)				
1920	North Hobart (5)	10.12 (72) – 6.16 (52)	Lefroy	8,000	Upper Cricket Ground
1921	Cananore (5)	6.18 (54) – 4.5 (29)	North Hobart	7,000	Upper Cricket Ground
1922	Cananore (6)	9.12 (66) – 8.8 (56)	North Hobart	n/a	North Hobart Oval
1923	North Hobart (6)	(No final played)			
1924	Lefroy (7)	8.3 (51) – 4.11 (35)	Cananore	n/a	North Hobart Oval
1925	Cananore (7)	(No final played)			
1926	Cananore (8)	14.8 (92) – 8.12 (60)	New Town	10,000	North Hobart Oval
1927	Cananore (9)	(No final played)			
1928	North Hobart (7)	(No final played)			
1929	North Hobart (8)	9.15 (69) – 7.12 (54)	Lefroy	10,020	North Hobart Oval
1930	Lefroy (8)	14.11 (95) – 10.17 (77)	North Hobart	6,000	North Hobart Oval
1931	Cananore (Note: A second game had to be played) (10)	9.12 (66) – 9.12 (66)	North Hobart	10,009	North Hobart Oval
1931	Cananore (10)	8.9 (57) – 7.12 (54)	North Hobart	10,083	North Hobart Oval
1932	North Hobart (9)	16.15 (111) – 9.5 (59)	Cananore	8,800	North Hobart Oval
1933	Cananore (11)	16.12 (108) – 8.16 (64)	North Hobart	6,500	North Hobart Oval
1934	North Hobart (10)	11.22 (88) –9.10 (64)	Lefroy	3,640	North Hobart Oval
1935	New Town (1)	18.9 (117) – 15.13 (103)	North Hobart	6,021	North Hobart Oval
1936	North Hobart (11)	13.9 (87) – 11.17 (83)	Lefroy	7,433	North Hobart Oval
1937	Lefroy (9)	17.12 (114) – 9.15 (69)	North Hobart	8,500	North Hobart Oval
1938	North Hobart (12)	13.15 (93) – 11.15 (81)	Lefroy	5,990	North Hobart Oval
1939	North Hobart (13)	10.9 (69) – 6.11 (47)	Cananore	5,078	North Hobart Oval
1940	North Hobart (14)	18.8 (116) – 7.17 (59)	Cananore	5,420	North Hobart Oval
1941	North Hobart (15)	12.17 (89) – 9.11 (65)	Cananore	4,034	North Hobart Oval
1942	(Suspended due to World War II)				
1943	(Suspended due to World War II)				
1944	(Suspended due to World War II)				
1945	North Hobart (16)	10.17 (77) – 7.6 (48)	Sandy Bay	5,980	North Hobart Oval
1946	Sandy Bay (1)	12.16 (88) – 5.16 (46)	New Town	12,500	North Hobart Oval
1947	North Hobart (17)	13.7 (85) – 10.9 (69)	Hobart	11,396	North Hobart Oval
1948	New Town (2)	11.15 (81) – 9.11 (65)	North Hobart	12,236	North Hobart Oval
1949	New Town (3)	10.8 (68) – 4.11 (35)	Hobart	15,086	North Hobart Oval
1950	Hobart (1)	11.12 (78) – 11.10 (76)	New Town	12,697	North Hobart Oval
1951	New Town (4)	20.14 (134) – 9.9 (63)	North Hobart	13,079	North Hobart Oval
1952	Sandy Bay (2)	14.9 (93) – 11.9 (75)	Hobart	11,086	North Hobart Oval
1953	New Town (5)	16.18 (114) – 15.13 (103)	Sandy Bay	11,860	North Hobart Oval
1954	Hobart (2)	12.10 (82) – 10.12 (72)	New Town	11,461	North Hobart Oval
1955	New Town (6)	15.11 (101) – 8.18 (66)	Hobart	13,429	North Hobart Oval
1956	New Town (7)	8.7 (55) – 7.10 (52)	North Hobart	12,182	North Hobart Oval
1957	North Hobart (18)	11.15 (81) – 9.15 (69)	Glenorchy	16,363	North Hobart Oval
1958	Glenorchy (8)	15.15 (105) – 11.11 (77)	Sandy Bay	15,643	North Hobart Oval
1959	Hobart (3)	9.14 (68) – 2.9 (21)	New Norfolk	10,103	North Hobart Oval
1960	Hobart (4)	6.7 (43) – 6.3 (39)	North Hobart	6,001	North Hobart Oval
1961	North Hobart (19)	16.12 (108) – 11.6 (72)	Glenorchy	15,217	North Hobart Oval
1962	North Hobart (20)	10.12 (72) – 7.15 (57)	Clarence	19,311	North Hobart Oval
1963	Hobart (5)	10.4 (64) – 6.13 (49)	Sandy Bay	14,498	North Hobart Oval
1964	Sandy Bay (3)	11.11 (77) – 9.11 (65)	New Norfolk	20,775	North Hobart Oval
1965	Glenorchy (9)	10.15 (75) – 6.8 (44)	North Hobart	18,548	North Hobart Oval
1966	Hobart (6)	10.14 (74) – 11.7 (73)	Glenorchy	16,699	North Hobart Oval
1967	North Hobart (21)	11.12 (78) – 8.16 (64)	Glenorchy	17,523	North Hobart Oval
1968	New Norfolk (1)	14.13 (97) – 9.14 (68)	North Hobart	19,236	North Hobart Oval
1969	North Hobart (22)	19.15 (129) – 17.15 (117)	Clarence	19,425	North Hobart Oval
1970	Clarence (1)	19.16 (130) – 10.15 (75)	New Norfolk	24,413	North Hobart Oval
1971	Sandy Bay (4)	18.13 (121) – 16.16 (112)	Clarence	20,364	North Hobart Oval
1972	Sandy Bay (5)	18.9 (117) – 10.14 (74)	New Norfolk	17,304	North Hobart Oval
1973	Hobart (7)	11.19 (85) – 10.5 (65)	Sandy Bay	14,720	North Hobart Oval
1974	North Hobart (23)	21.10 (136) 15.18 (108)	Sandy Bay	16,234	North Hobart Oval
1975	Glenorchy (10)	15.16 (106) – 10.7 (67)	Sandy Bay	15,449	North Hobart Oval
1976	Sandy Bay (6)	21.10 (136) – 5.9 (39)	Glenorchy	10,881	North Hobart Oval
1977	Sandy Bay (7)	19.9 (123) – 5.14 (44)	Glenorchy	12,960	North Hobart Oval
1978	Sandy Bay (8)	11.14 (80) – 9.15 (69)	Glenorchy	18,662	North Hobart Oval
1979	Clarence (2)	12.11 (83) – 11.14 (80)	Glenorchy	24,968	North Hobart Oval
1980	Hobart (8)	14.9 (93) – 7.16 (58)	Glenorchy	17,111	North Hobart Oval
1981	Clarence (3)	15.23 (113) – 13.10 (88)	New Norfolk	20,193	North Hobart Oval
1982	New Norfolk (2)	13.9 (87) – 11.10 (76)	Glenorchy	16,124	North Hobart Oval
1983	Glenorchy (11)	28.19 (187) – 14.11 (95)	New Norfolk	17,900	North Hobart Oval
1984	Clarence (4)	13.13 (91) – 9.11 (65)	Glenorchy	14,664	North Hobart Oval
1985	Glenorchy (12)	10.15 (75) – 10.11 (71)	Clarence	16,561	North Hobart Oval
1986	Glenorchy (13)	14.20 (104) – 9.18 (72)	Sandy Bay	16,111	North Hobart Oval
1987	North Hobart (24)	23.20 (158) – 16.10 (106)	Glenorchy	17,094	North Hobart Oval
1988	Devonport (1)	15.7 (97) – 8.6 (54)	Glenorchy	17,878	North Hobart Oval
1989	North Hobart (25)	18.22 (130) – 16.4 (100)	Hobart	16,528	North Hobart Oval
1990	Hobart (9)	19.16 (130) – 10.12 (72)	North Launceston	15,633	North Hobart Oval
1991	North Hobart (26)	12.14 (86) – 8.12 (60)	North Launceston	13,112	North Hobart Oval
1992	North Hobart (27)	16.12 (108) – 10.13 (73)	Hobart	11,967	North Hobart Oval
1993	Clarence (5)	19.12 (126) – 17.15 (117)	North Launceston	13,102	North Hobart Oval
1994	Clarence (6)	13.13 (91) – 8.5 (53)	New Norfolk	14,230	North Hobart Oval
1995	North Launceston (1)	9.11 (65) – 7.13 (55)	Clarence	9,448	North Hobart Oval
1996	Clarence (7)	14.17 (101) – 10.14 (74)	Burnie Dockers	12,352	North Hobart Oval
1997	Clarence (8)	20.9 (129) – 18.14 (122)	Burnie Dockers	9,053	North Hobart Oval
1998	Northern Bombers (2)	14.16 (100) – 6.15 (51)	Clarence	9,638	North Hobart Oval
1999	Glenorchy (14)	15.9 (99) – 7.11 (53)	Northern Bombers	8,053	North Hobart Oval
2000	Clarence (9)	15.15 (105) – 8.8 (56)	Northern Bombers	6,124	York Park
2001 - 2008 Hiatus
2009	Clarence (10)	15.11 (101) – 14.11 (95)	Glenorchy	7,534	Bellerive Oval
2010	Clarence (11)	15.13 (103) – 6.10 (46)	Devonport	6,123	Bellerive Oval
2011	Launceston (1)	12.14 (86) – 6.6 (42)	Burnie Dockers	6,658	Aurora Stadium
2012	Burnie (1)	16.14 (110) – 9.8 (62)	Launceston	5,569	Aurora Stadium
2013	South Launceston (1)	10.14 (74) – 9.11 (65)	Burnie Dockers	5,904	Aurora Stadium
2014	North Launceston (3)	18.13 (121) – 10.2 (62)	Western Storm	5,842	Aurora Stadium
2015	North Launceston (4)	13.13 (91) – 11.13 (79)	Glenorchy	5,978	Bellerive Oval
2016	Glenorchy (15)	9.6 (60) – 5.10 (40)	North Launceston	6,128	Aurora Stadium
2017	North Launceston (5)	21.22 (148) – 9.7 (61)	Lauderdale	6,108	Aurora Stadium
2018	North Launceston (6)	7.21 (63) – 4.9 (33)	Lauderdale	4,423	University of Tasmania Stadium
2019	North Launceston (7)	13.10 (88) – 9.5 (59)	Lauderdale	4,692	Bellerive Oval
2020	Launceston (2)	8.4 (52) – 5.9 (39)	North Launceston	3,000	University of Tasmania Stadium
2021	Launceston (3)	12.5 (77) – 6.7 (43)	North Launceston	3,500	University of Tasmania Stadium
2022	Launceston (4)	16.14 (110) - 5.8 (38)	Kingborough	-	University of Tasmania Stadium
2023	Kingborough (1)	8.8 (56) - 5.11 (41)	North Launceston	-	North Hobart Oval
2024	North Launceston (8)	16.9 (105) – 12.13 (85)	Lauderdale	–	University of Tasmania Stadium

== Finals systems ==
- 1879–1906
- From 1907 to 1928, the home-and-away season was played over five rounds, that is each club played the others five times. In the first three rounds, premiership points were awarded 2 for a win and 1 for a draw; and in the last two rounds, premiership points were awarded 4 for a win and 2 for a draw. The club with the most premiership points (with the leader determined by play-off if tied) would then have to play a grand final against the club with best win–loss record, if that record was equal or better than that of the premiership points leader. If there was no such club, then the premiership points leader won the premiership; otherwise, then the winner of the play-off won the premiership. Among variations to the system:
  - In 1907, the grand final challenger needed a strictly better win-loss record, not an equal record
  - In some seasons, the home-and-away season was extended to six rounds, with the last two or three of those rounds being worth double points.
- From 1929 to 1941, the home-and-away season featured three rounds played for 4 premiership points per win, and two rounds played for 6 premiership points per win. A three-team system with challenge was then played, with the initial 1–3 seeds based on premiership points, and the right of challenge going only to the team with the strictly best home-and-away win-loss record.
- From 1945 to 1946, all home-and-away matches were played for 4 premiership points per win. A three-team system with challenge was then played based solely on premiership points seeding.
- From 1947 to 1985, the four-team Page-McIntyre system was used.
- From 1986 to 1999, the five-team McIntyre final five system was used.
- In 2000, the four-team Page-McIntyre system was used.
- From 2009 to 2010, unique final six systems were used.
- From 2011 to 2019, the five-team McIntyre final five system was used.
- From 2020 to 2024, the four-team Page-McIntyre system has been used.

== Premiers by club ==
Club	Titles	Years won
North Hobart	27	1902, 1905, 1908, 1914, 1920, 1923, 1928, 1929, 1932, 1934, 1936, 1938, 1939, 1940, 1941, 1945, 1947, 1957, 1961, 1962, 1967, 1969, 1974, 1987, 1989, 1991, 1992
Glenorchy / New Town	15	1935, 1948, 1949, 1951, 1953, 1955, 1956, 1958, 1965, 1975, 1983, 1985, 1986, 1999, 2016
Cananore	11	1909, 1910, 1911, 1913, 1921, 1922, 1925, 1926, 1927, 1931, 1933
Clarence	11	1970, 1979, 1981, 1984, 1993, 1994, 1996, 1997, 2000, 2009, 2010
Lefroy	9	1898, 1899, 1901, 1907, 1912, 1915, 1924, 1930, 1937
Hobart	9	1950, 1954, 1959, 1960, 1963, 1966, 1973, 1980, 1990
Railway	9	1881, 1882, 1883, 1887, 1889, 1893, 1894, 1895, 1896
Sandy Bay	8	1946, 1952, 1964, 1971, 1972, 1976, 1977, 1978
North Launceston	8	1995, 1998, 2014, 2015, 2017, 2018, 2019, 2024
City	4	1879, 1886, 1888, 1892
Launceston	4	2011, 2020, 2021, 2022
Holebrook	3	1885, 1890, 1891
Wellington	3	1900, 1903, 1904
New Norfolk	2	1968, 1982
Cricketers	2	1880, 1884
Hobart (City) (Note: Not the current Hobart City FC but another club)	1	1897
Derwent	1	1906
Devonport	1	1988
Burnie Dockers	1	2012
South Launceston	1	2013
Kingborough	1	2023

== Other competitions ==
=== Tasmanian State Premiers ===
The Tasmanian State Premiership took place between the reigning TFL/TANFL premier, the premier from the Northern Tasmanian Football Association and from 1954, the premier of the North West Football Union.

=== Winfield Statewide Cup ===
The 1980 Winfield Statewide Cup was a round-robin statewide tournament that took place between the top 21 clubs in Tasmania from the TANFL, the NTFA and the NWFU.

Year	Premier	Score	Runner-up	Attend.	Venue
1980	Hobart	9.21 (75) – 7.4 (46)	Clarence	5,961	North Hobart Oval
