= Cananore Football Club =

Cananore
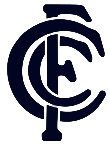

Names
- Full name: Cananore Football Club
- Nickname(s): Canaries

Club details
- Founded: 1901; 124 years ago
- Dissolved: 1941; 84 years ago (succeeded by Hobart Football Club, established 1944)
- Colours
- Ground(s): TCA Ground (capacity: 8,000)

Cananore Football Club was an Australian rules football club founded in 1901. It competed in the Tasmanian Football League (TFL/TANFL) as a junior club from 1901 to 1907, and as a senior club between 1908 and 1941. They were known as the Canaries and wore black and gold as their club colours.

In 1942, the TFL competition was suspended indefinitely due to World War II. The club did not resume competition after the war and, to all intents and purposes, the former Cananore Football Club was transformed into what is now the Hobart Football Club.

== History ==
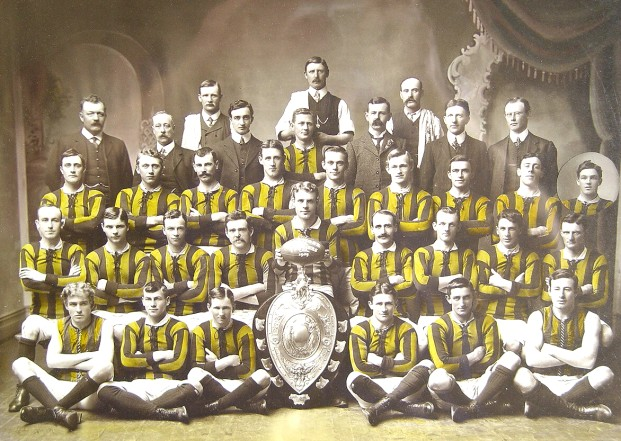
Cananore Football Club's 1909 premiership team.

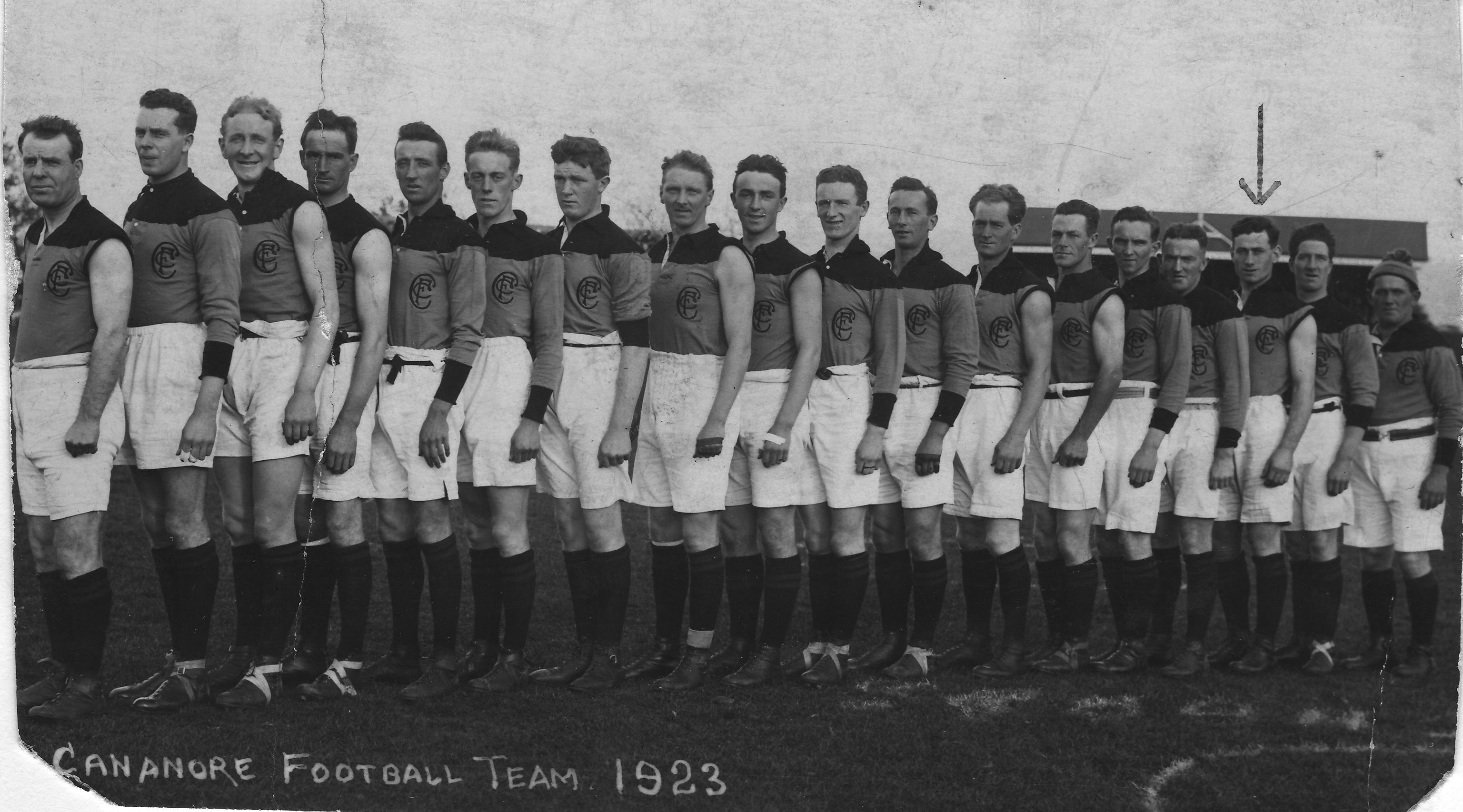
The 1923 Cananore Football Team. Jack Gardiner, the captain-coach (then aged 42), is at the far left; Ted Terry (marked with arrow) is third from the right.

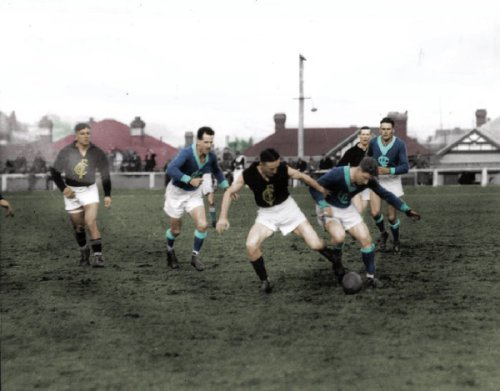
Cananore v Lefroy at North Hobart Oval in 1938.

Cananore played as a junior club between 1901 and 1907; and, as a junior club, played their matches at West Hobart Oval (the current school oval of the Lansdowne Crescent School) .

Cananore gained senior club status for the 1908 TFL season; and, from then, played their home games at the Tasmanian Cricket Association Ground.

The name of the Cananore Football Club was derived from a misspelt plaque on a large family home, which had been a gathering point for fans of the club in its formative years. The house is long demolished and the plaque is now displayed in the Hobart Football Clubrooms.

"Cannanore was the British name of a district in India in the 19th century which is now called Kannur.
The district was an important port on the Arabian Sea and the British military headquarters on India's west coast until 1887.
It is believed one of the founders of Cananore chose the name as they had been based [at Cannanore] in earlier years and had brought home an incorrectly spelt name plaque, which adorned the entry to a building at which many supporters of the new entity met.
While no official amalgamation of Cananore and Hobart took place, it is widely regarded that from Cananore's ashes Hobart grew, with strong family ties linking the history of the two clubs." — The Mercury, 8 September 2010.

The club were TFL/TANFL premiers eleven times and Tasmanian State Premiers on ten occasions.

The Canaries' final season of football was the 1941 TANFL Season under coach J.Cashmore. The club would go into recess due to World War Two, and, in 1944, TANFL executives drew up a plan to turn the competition into a regulated, district-based format upon resumption of the League in 1945, rather than the previous motley collection of clubs.

As a result of these changes, Cananore was replaced in the TANFL by the Hobart Football Club who would go on to share the same black and gold colours, same home ground (TCA Ground) and many of the same players and supporters from Cananore would go on to be involved with Hobart for many years to come.

== Tasmanian Football Hall of Fame ==
On 18 May 2010, AFL Tasmania announced that the Cananore Football Club and Hobart Football Club would be inducted together in the Great Clubs category of the Tasmanian Football Hall of Fame.

== Notable footballers ==
Two Cananore footballers to have been inducted in the Australian Football Hall of Fame are Albert Collier, who was also known for his long career at Victorian Football League club Collingwood, and Horrie Gorringe, who played his entire career at Cananore. Cananore footballers to have played in the VFL include Claude Bryan, Jack Cashman, Jack Gardiner, Pat Hartnett, Fred Pringle, Alan Scott, Ted Terry, and Graham Tudor. Fred Easton joined Port Adelaide in 1911.

== Honours ==
=== Club ===
- Tasmanian Football League (11): 1909, 1910, 1911, 1913, 1921, 1922, 1925, 1926, 1927, 1931, 1933
- Tasmanian State Premiership (10): 1909, 1910, 1911, 1913, 1921, 1922, 1925, 1926, 1927, 1931

=== Individual ===
==== William Leitch Medallists ====
- 1930 - Jack Billett.
- 1931 - Albert Collier.

==== George Watt Medallists ====
- 1940 - Geoff Kilmartin.

==== TFL Leading Goalkickers ====
- 1909 - F.Burton (11)
- 1910 - C.Ward (16)
- 1911 - C.Ward (24)
- 1913 - G.Badenach (13)
- 1924 - J.Brain (47)
- 1925 - J.Brain (64)
- 1926 - F.Ahearne (50)
- 1927 - F.Ahearne (45)
