= Lefroy Football Club =

Australian rules football club in Tasmania

Lefroy

Names
- Full name: Lefroy Football Club
- Nickname(s): Blues

1898 (1st) season

Club details
- Founded: 28 April 1898
- Dissolved: 1941; 84 years ago
- Colours
- Competition: Tasmanian Football League
- Ground(s): TCA Ground; North Hobart Oval

Uniforms
Home

Lefroy Football Club were an Australian rules football club which competed in the Tasmanian Football League (TFL/TANFL). They were known as The Blues and played their home games at North Hobart Oval as well as the Tasmanian Cricket Association Ground. Lefroy players wore dark and light blue as their club colours.

The club was formed at a meeting called by Mr Oscar H. Jones in the Rialto Room, Liverpool Street, Hobart on 28 April 1898 for the purpose of reviving club football in Hobart.

After starting out in the STFA, the club joined the TFL in 1906 when the league was renamed and played in the league until 1941.

Lefroy and Cananore were two of the original clubs to be replaced in the league after World War Two (by Sandy Bay and Hobart respectively) when the TANFL switched to a district-based competition.

Notable footballers to have played with Lefroy include Jim Atkinson, Harvey Kelly and Eric Zschech.

Lefroy were league premiers on nine occasions and dual Tasmanian State Premiership winners.

== Premierships ==
- Tasmanian Football League
  - Premierships (9): 1898, 1899, 1901, 1907, 1912, 1915, 1924, 1930, 1937
  - Runners-Up (12): 1900, 1902, 1908, 1909, 1911, 1913, 1920, 1927, 1929, 1934, 1936, 1938,
- Tasmanian State Premiership (2): 1912, 1924

== Club Facts ==
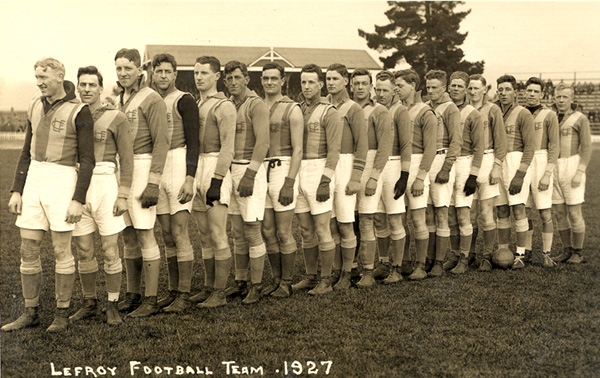
A Lefroy F.C. team in 1927, when they finished runners-up.

Most Games:

- 212 by Gavin Luttrell

W.R. Gill Memorial Trophy Winner:

- E.R.Smith 1925

George Watt Medallists:

- Eric Zschech 1936, 1937 & 1939

TFL Top Goalkickers:

- 1898 ― W.Abel (11)
- 1899 ― W.Facy (16)
- 1901 ― R.Hawson (18)
- 1912 ― A.Jones (17)
- 1915 ― A.Ringrose (18)
- 1921 ― R.Manson (42)
- 1922 ― R.Manson (41)
- 1934 ― T.Heathorn (101)

Highest Score:

- 34.18 (222) vs. Cananore in 1934

Record Crowd:

- 10,020 ― Lefroy v North Hobart ― 1929 TANFL Grand Final at North Hobart Oval
