= Northern Tasmanian Football Association =

The Northern Tasmanian Football Association may refer to one of two leagues:

- Northern Tasmanian Football Association (1886–1986), the original NTFA
- Northern Tasmanian Football Association (1996), current version of the NTFA
