= Latrobe Football League =

Australian rules football league

- Most recent season or competition: 1953
- Sport: Australian rules football
- Founded: 1925
- Folded: 1953
- No. of teams: 4 (1954), 15 (historical)
- Country: Australia
- Last champion: Latrobe United (1953)

The Latrobe Football League was an Australian rules football competition based around the town of Latrobe in northern Tasmania.

== History ==
The Latrobe Football League was formed in 1925 with the goal of encouraging junior football in the Latrobe area. The initial clubs were Harford, Sassafras and Latrobe Rovers, and the first premiership was won by Sassafras. Railton joined the LFL in 1926. Harford were excluded from the LFL before the 1927 season owing to a late application to join, with their position being taken by Moriarty. 1929 saw only three teams competing as Moriarty did not form a team, however they would return a year later and the addition of Kimberley from the Dunorlan Football Association brought the number of clubs to 5. By 1934 a second Railton club, Cement Rovers, had joined the League along with Sheffield from the Kentish Football Association. Railton had dominated the competition until this point, winning 5 premierships in 6 years between 1929 and 1934. Sheffield returned to the Kentish FA in 1935 but rejoined the LFL in 1937, along with fellow KFA club Barrington and former Central FA club Deloraine. Kimberley departed for the Chudleigh FA prior to the 1937 season while Sassafras had folded before the completion of the 1936 season. Although the LFL featured a strong line-up of clubs in 1937, its demise was rapid, with Goliath (a re-named Cement Rovers) and Barrington departing after 1937 and Deloraine after 1938, forcing the League to fold.

The Latrobe Football League was re-established in 1951, with Moriarty, Sassafras, Latrobe Colts Latrobe YCW and Railton Seconds competing. Many of these clubs had competed in the NWFA's reserves competition for the previous few seasons but now decided to form their own League to compete in. This iteration of the LFL only lasted three years and folded in early 1954.

== Clubs ==
=== Final ===
Club	Colours	Nickname	Home Ground	Former league	Est.	Years in LFL	LFL Senior Premierships		Fate
Club	Colours	Nickname	Home Ground	Former league	Est.	Years in LFL	Total	Years	Fate
Latrobe Rovers (Latrobe Juniors 1930-38)			Latrobe Football Ground, Latrobe	–	1925	1925-1938, 1953	1	1927	Folded after 1953 season
Latrobe United			Latrobe Football Ground, Latrobe	–	1952	1952-1953	1	1953	Folded after 1953 season
Moriarty		Spudpickers	Henry Dawson's Paddock, Moriarty	NWFA	1904	1927-1928, 1930 1951-1953	1	1952	Folded after 1953 season
Sassafras	(1905)(1946-50)		Sassafras Reserve, Sassafras	NWFA	1905	1925-1936, 1950-1953	5	1925, 1926, 1928, 1935, 1951	Entered recess in 1937. Folded after 1953 season

=== Former ===
Club	Colours	Nickname	Home Ground	Former league	Est.	Years in LFL	LFL Senior Premierships		Fate
Club	Colours	Nickname	Home Ground	Former league	Est.	Years in LFL	Total	Years	Fate
Barrington		Robins	Barrington Football Ground, Barrington	KFA	1895	1937	0	-	Moved to Wilmot FA in 1938
Deloraine		Magpies	Deloraine Recreation Ground, Deloraine	CFA	1894	1937-1938	1	1937	Moved to NTFA seconds competition in 1939
Goliath (Cement Rovers 1932-35)	Dark with light monogram		Railton Recreation Ground, Railton	KFA	1930	1931-1932, 1934-1937	2	1931, 1936	Played in Kentish FA in 1933. Folded after 1937 season
Harford			Harford Recreation Ground, Harford	EDJFA	1905	1925-1926	0	-	Refused affiliation in 1927 and subsequently folded.
High School			Latrobe Football Ground, Latrobe	–	1952	1952	0	-	Folded after 1952 season
Kimberley		Robins	Kimberley Recreation Ground, Kimberley	DFA	1902	1930-1936	0	-	Moved to Chudleigh FA in 1937
Latrobe Colts			Latrobe Football Ground, Latrobe	–	1951	1951	0	-	Folded after 1951 season
Latrobe YCW			Latrobe Football Ground, Latrobe	–	1951	1951-1952	0	-	Folded after 1952 season
Railton		Tigers	Railton Recreation Ground, Railton	KFA	1900	1926-1930, 1932-1938	6	1929, 1930, 1932, 1933, 1934, 1938	Recess in 1931. Moved to NWFA in 1939.
Railton seconds		Tigers	Railton Recreation Ground, Railton	NWFA	1900	1951	0	-	Moved to NWFA in 1952
Sheffield	(1933-37)(1938)		Sheffield Football Ground, Sheffield	KFA	1904	1933-1934, 1937-1938	0	-	Played in Kentish FA in 1935-36. Moved to NWFA in 1939

== Premierships ==
Year	Premier	Score	Runners-up	Notes
1925	Sassafras		Latrobe Rovers	No grand final
1926	Sassafras	9.9 (63) - 7.16 (78)	Railton	
1927	Latrobe Rovers	10.14 (74) - 5.10 (40)	Sassafras	
1928	Sassafras	7.11 (53) - 2.8 (20)	Railton	
1929	Railton	7.15 (57) - 7.10 (52)	Sassafras	
1930	Railton	8.6 (54) - 4.7 (31)	Kimberley	
1931	Cement Rovers	12.19 (91) - 1.9 (15)	Kimberley	
1932	Railton	7.7 (49) - 5.11 (41)	Latrobe Rovers	
1933	Railton	6.16 (52) - 6.11 (47)	Kimberley	
1934	Railton	17.15 (117) - 5.3 (33)	Cement Rovers	
1935	Sassafras	10.17 (73) - 8.10 (58)	Railton	
1936	Goliath	11.16 (82) - 7.16 (53)	Railton	
1937	Deloraine	12.6 (78) - 5.16 (46)	Railton	
1938	Railton	10.8 (68) - 3.10 (28)	Sheffield	
1939-50	LFL in recess			
1951	Sassafras	11.8 (74) - 9.14 (68)	Latrobe YCW	
1952	Moriarty	6.12 (48) - 5.16 (46)	Latrobe United	
1953	Latrobe United	8.7 (55) - 4.10 (34)	Moriarty	
