= Leven Football Association =

The Leven Football Association (LFA) was an Australian rules football competition in Tasmania, Australia. Four clubs from small communities in northern Tasmania competed for the premiership every year. The games were played on Saturday and both matches were at the same ground in the form of a double-header. Having gone into recess for the 2016 season, the LFA folded in October 2016 after 92 years as a football league.

== History ==
Founded 1924 to provide a competition for teams in the Ulverstone Municipality.

This Association succeeded various earlier Associations, it has been a valuable feeder ground for NWFU and NTFL clubs in particular Ulverstone.

Forth won the first premiership of the competition in 1924. Several clubs started in this association before moving into a stronger competition after establishing themselves, Turners Beach and West Ulverstone are now both in the NWFA however Railton and Mole Creek both moved the other way.

The association went into recess when Upper Castra couldn't field a side for the 2016 season. The association was supposed to be absorbed by the NWFL and be its Central Division, however this did not eventuate and the remaining clubs folded prior to the 2016 season.

== Clubs ==
=== Final ===
Club	Colours	Nickname	Home Ground	Former League	Est.	Years in LFA	LFA Premierships		Fate
Club	Colours	Nickname	Home Ground	Former League	Est.	Years in LFA	Total	Years	Fate
Mole Creek		Bulldogs	Mole Creek Recreation Ground, Mole Creek	NWFA	1920	2004-2015	6	2004, 2006, 2008, 2010, 2011, 2013	Folded after 2015 season
Railton		Tigers	Railton Recreation Reserve, Railton	NWFA	1891	1990-2015	15	1990, 1991, 1992, 1994, 1995, 1997, 1998, 1999, 2001, 2002, 2003, 2005, 2007, 2009, 2015	Folded after 2015 season
Upper Castra	(1950s)(1960s)(?-2015	Magpies	Sprent Recreation Ground, Sprent	WDJFA	1912	1925-1931, 1933-1934, 1938-1940, 1946-1992, 1999-2015	9	1926, 1930, 1965, 1967, 1980, 1984, 1985, 1988, 2014	Folded after 2015 season
Wilmot		Robins	Wilmot Football Ground, Wilmot	NWFA	1891	1975-2015	0	-	Folded after 2015 season

=== Former ===
Club	Colours	Nickname	Home Ground	Former League	Est.	Years in LFA	LFA Premierships		Fate
Club	Colours	Nickname	Home Ground	Former League	Est.	Years in LFA	Total	Years	Fate
East Ulverstone				NWJFA		1924-1925	1	1925	Left league
Forth		Magpies	Forth Recreation Ground, Forth	NWFA	1904	1924-1925, 1944-1945	2	1924, 1945	Moved to NWFA after 1945 season
Gawler	(1926)(1982-89)		Haywoods Reserve, Ulverstone	NWJFA	1920	1924, 1930-1931, 1982-1989	1	1983	Folded after 1989 season
Gunns Plains	Dark with light vee			–	1926	1926-1929, 1932-1935, 1946-1949, 1952-1960	1	1953	Folded after 1960 season
Kindred		Bulldogs	Kindred Football Ground, Kindred	WDJFA	1910	1925-1926, 1935-1940, 1946-1951, 1968	0	-	Folded after 1968 season
Latrobe Saints (Mersey Valley Workers' Club 1987-95, Devonport Saints 1996-2000)	(1987-95)(1996-2011)	Saints	Railton Recreation Reserve, Railton	–	1987	1987-2011	2	1989, 2000	Folded after 2011 season
Meander Valley		Suns	Westbury Recreation Ground, Westbury	–	2012	2012-2013	1	2012	Moved to NTFA after 2013 season
Motton Preston		Demons	Preston Recreation Ground, Preston	–	1967	1967-1976	1	1975	Moved to NWFA after 1976 season
Motton Rovers (North Motton 1924-66)		Rovers	Sprent Recreation Ground, Sprent	NWJFA		1924-2000	18	1928, 1934, 1935, 1936, 1937, 1938, 1939, 1940, 1946, 1950, 1951, 1952, 1954, 1975, 1982, 1986, 1987, 1993,	Merged with Motton Preston following 2000 season
Nietta			Nietta Football Ground, Nietta	–	1936	1936-1940, 1945-1946, 1948-1949	0	-	Folded after 1949 season
Preston	Dark-light-dark tri-panel (1920s-30s)(?-1966)		Preston Recreation Ground, Preston	–	1923	1926-1940, 1944-1951, 1953-1966	11	1927, 1929, 1931, 1932, 1933, 1955, 1956, 1957, 1958, 1959, 1964	Merged with Motton Rovers to form Motton Preston following 1966 season
Prospect Hawks		Hawks	Prospect Park, Prospect, Tasmania	–	2010	2010	0	-	Moved to NTFA after 2010 season
South Riana		Saints	Riana Football Ground, Riana	RFA	1920	1965-1973	1	1971	Folded after 1973 season
Sprent		Tigers	Sprent Recreation Ground, Sprent	WDJFA	1908	1924-1934, 1927-1928, 1944-1946, 1948-1981	7	1944, 1962, 1976, 1977, 1978, 1979, 1981	Moved to NWFA after 1981 season
Turners Beach		Seagulls	Turners Beach Football Ground, Turners Beach	–	1971	1971-1975	3	1972, 1973, 1974	Moved to NWFA after 1975 season
Ulverstone Rovers			Ulverstone Football Ground, Ulverstone			1927-1940	0	-	Folded after 1940 season
Ulverstone Thirds		Robins	Ulverstone Football Ground, Ulverstone	–	1920	1949, 1952-1970	0	-	Moved to NWFA as Ulverstone Districts after 1970 season
West Ulverstone		Lions	West Ulverstone Football Ground, West Ulverstone	–	1973	1973-1981	0	-	Moved to Darwin FA after 1981 season
Western Juniors			West Ulverstone Football Ground, West Ulverstone	–	1933	1924, 1936-1940, 1944, 1946-1949	3	1947, 1948, 1949	?
Zeehan		Bulldogs	Zeehan Recreation Ground, Zeehan	WTFA	1950s	1994-1998	1	1996	Folded after 1998 season

== Premiers ==
- 1924 FORTH
- 1925 ULVERSTONE JUNIORS
- 1926 UPPER CASTRA
- 1927 PRESTON
- 1928 MOTTON ROVERS
- 1929 PRESTON
- 1930 UPPER CASTRA
- 1931 PRESTON
- 1932 PRESTON
- 1933 PRESTON
- 1934 MOTTON ROVERS
- 1935 MOTTON ROVERS
- 1936 MOTTON ROVERS
- 1937 MOTTON ROVERS
- 1938 MOTTON ROVERS
- 1939 MOTTON ROVERS
- 1940 MOTTON ROVERS
- 1941 COMPETITION SUSPENDED DUE TO WWII
- 1942 COMPETITION SUSPENDED DUE TO WWII
- 1943 COMPETITION SUSPENDED DUE TO WWII
- 1944 SPRENT
- 1945 FORTH
- 1946 MOTTON ROVERS
- 1947 WESTERN JUNIORS
- 1948 WESTERN JUNIORS
- 1949 WESTERN JUNIORS
- 1950 MOTTON ROVERS
- 1951 MOTTON ROVERS
- 1952 MOTTON ROVERS
- 1953 GUNNS PLAINS
- 1954 MOTTON ROVERS
- 1955 PRESTON
- 1956 PRESTON
- 1957 PRESTON
- 1958 PRESTON
- 1959 PRESTON
- 1960 ULVERSTONE THIRDS
- 1961 KINDRED
- 1962 SPRENT
- 1963 ULVERSTONE THIRDS
- 1964 PRESTON
- 1965 UPPER CASTRA
- 1966 ULVERSTONE JUNIORS
- 1967 UPPER CASTRA
- 1968 ULVERSTONE JUNIORS
- 1969 MOTTON PRESTON
- 1970 ULVERSTONE JUNIORS
- 1971 SOUTH RIANA
- 1972 TURNERS BEACH
- 1973 TURNERS BEACH
- 1974 TURNERS BEACH
- 1975 MOTTON PRESTON
- 1976 SPRENT
- 1977 SPRENT
- 1978 SPRENT
- 1979 SPRENT
- 1980 CASTRA
- 1981 SPRENT
- 1982 MOTTON ROVERS
- 1983 GAWLER
- 1984 CASTRA
- 1985 CASTRA
- 1986 MOTTON ROVERS
- 1987 MOTTON ROVERS
- 1988 CASTRA
- 1989 MERSEY VALLEY WORKERS CLUB
- 1990 RAILTON
- 1991 RAILTON
- 1992 RAILTON
- 1993 MOTTON ROVERS
- 1994 RAILTON
- 1995 RAILTON
- 1996 ZEEHAN
- 1997 RAILTON
- 1998 RAILTON
- 1999 RAILTON
- 2000 DEVONPORT SAINTS
- 2001 RAILTON
- 2002 RAILTON
- 2003 RAILTON
- 2004 MOLE CREEK
- 2005 RAILTON
- 2006 MOLE CREEK
- 2007 RAILTON
- 2008 MOLE CREEK
- 2009 RAILTON
- 2010 MOLE CREEK
- 2011 MOLE CREEK
- 2012 MEANDER VALLEY
- 2013 MOLE CREEK
- 2014 UPPER CASTRA
- 2015 RAILTON

== 2011 Ladder ==
Leven FA	Wins	Byes	Losses	Draws	For	Against	%	Pts	Final	Team	G	B	Pts	Team	G	B	Pts
Mole Creek	14	3	0	0	3734	354	1054.80%	56	1st Semi	Railton	35	19	229	Latrobe Saints	3	3	21
Wilmot	8	4	5	0	1356	1455	93.20%	32	2nd Semi	Mole Creek	25	17	167	Wilmot	8	2	50
Railton	6	4	7	0	1395	1611	86.59%	24	Preliminary	Railton	15	13	103	Wilmot	9	8	62
Latrobe Saints	6	3	8	0	1369	2138	64.03%	24	Grand	Mole Creek	21	15	141	Railton	11	10	76
Upper Castra	0	3	14	0	491	2787	17.62%	0									

== 2012 Ladder ==
Leven FA	Wins	Byes	Losses	Draws	For	Against	%	Pts	Final	Team	G	B	Pts	Team	G	B	Pts
Meander Valley Suns	11	3	3	0	1825	810	225.31%	44	1st Semi	Mole Creek	27	14	176	Wilmot	8	8	56
Railton	11	3	3	0	1594	962	165.70%	44	2nd Semi	Meander Valley Suns	15	18	108	Railton	12	6	78
Mole Creek	9	4	4	0	1334	928	143.75%	36	Preliminary	Mole Creek	13	7	85	Railton	11	18	84
Wilmot	3	4	10	0	938	1475	63.59%	12	Grand	Meander Valley Suns	13	9	87	Mole Creek	10	10	70
Upper Castra	0	3	14	0	462	1978	23.36%	0									

== 2013 Ladder ==
Leven FA	Wins	Byes	Losses	Draws	For	Against	%	Pts	Final	Team	G	B	Pts	Team	G	B	Pts
Mole Creek	14	0	2	0	2581	760	339.61%	56	1st Semi	Meander Valley Suns	26	20	176	Wilmot	5	1	31
Railton	12	0	4	0	2070	1174	176.32%	48	2nd Semi	Mole Creek	21	13	139	Railton	12	11	83
Meander Valley Suns	10	0	6	0	1688	1064	158.65%	40	Preliminary	Meander Valley Suns	18	14	122	Railton	11	10	76
Wilmot	4	0	12	0	830	2005	41.40%	16	Grand	Mole Creek	12	12	84	Meander Valley Suns	13	4	82
Upper Castra	0	0	16	0	375	2541	14.76%	0									

== 2014 Ladder ==
Leven FA	Wins	Byes	Losses	Draws	For	Against	%	Pts	Final	Team	G	B	Pts	Team	G	B	Pts
Upper Castra	13	0	3	0	2716	795	341.64%	52	1st Semi	Mole Creek	25	17	167	Wilmot	5	2	32
Railton	13	0	3	0	2310	839	275.33%	52	2nd Semi	Upper Castra	27	18	180	Railton	7	8	50
Mole Creek	6	0	10	0	1393	1844	75.54%	24	Preliminary	Railton	25	9	159	Mole Creek	11	10	76
Wilmot	0	0	16	0	379	3320	11.42%	0	Grand	Upper Castra	17	17	119	Railton	9	6	60

== Leading Goal Kickers ==
Year	Player	H&A goals	Finals goals	Total Goals
1982	Nazza Haywood (Motton Rovers)	100		100
1983	David Banner (Upper Castra)	55	7	62
1984	David Banner (Upper Castra)	37	12	49
1985				
1986	Robbie Campbell (Wilmot)	49	0	49
1987				
1988	Mark Harris (Motton Rovers)	53	0	53
1989	B Wolfe (Wilmot)	47	0	47
1990	Kerry Jackson (Mersey Valley)	33	0	33
1991	Darren Cowburn (Railton)	49	0	49
1992	Kerry Jackson (Mersey Valley)			
1993	Kerry Jackson (Mersey Valley)			
1994	Ricky Jefferies (Railton)	65	0	65
1995	Paul Lawrence (Railton)	44	3	47
1996	Brian Powe (Zeehan)	96	7	103
1997	Darren Wall (Devonport Saints)	102		102
1998	Michael Schultz (Zeehan)	78	20	98
1999	Peter Coventry (Devonport Saints)			
2000	Leigh Clarke (Devonport Saints)	80	0	80
2001	Corey Bissett (Wilmot)	81	0	81
2002	Mark Alford (Railton)	129	0	129
2003	Craig Horton (Latrobe Saints)	40	0	40
2004	Paul Burford (Mole Creek)	69	0	69
2005	Michael Leedham (Railton)	64	5	69
2006	Gary Latham (Latrobe Saints)	87	5	92
2007	Andrew Stretton (Railton)	129	0	129
2008	Paul Hampton (Mole Creek)	166		166
2009	Tim West (Mole Creek)	101		101
2010	Chris Bray (Railton)	110	6	116
2011	Shane Campbell (Mole Creek)	146	13	159
2012	Alex Wadley (Meander VS)	100	0	100
2013				
2014	Darren Jenkins (Railton)	108	1	109

== Web site ==
- Official Association Site

== Published books ==
- Australian rules football in Tasmania, John Stoward, 2002, ISBN 0-9577515-7-5
