= Bridgenorth Football Club =

Names
- Full name: Bridgenorth Football Club
- Nickname: The Parrots

Club details
- Founded: 1923
- Colours: Green, gold and red
- Competition: Northern Tasmanian Football Association
- Coach: Oliver Cook
- Ground: Bridgenorth Rec Ground Bridge (capacity: 1500)

Other information
- Official website: Bridgenorth FC website

Bridgenorth Football Club (nicknamed the Parrots) is an Australian team formed in 1923 in Tasmania. Since 1996 they have participated in the Northern Tasmanian Football Association. The club's home ground is Bridgenorth Rec Ground, also known as Parrot Park, located in Bridgenorth, 7 km from Legana.

== History and flags ==
- West Tamar Football Association 1924–1969,
  - 1929, 1949, 1950, 1951, 1952, 1956, 1959, 1960, 1963, 1967
- Tamar Football Association 1970–1984,
  - 1983, 1984
- Northern Amateurs 1985–1995,
- Northern Tasmanian Football Association Division One 1996–2011
  - 1996, 2010
