= Kentish Football Association =

Australian rules football league

- Most recent season or competition: 1954
- Sport: Australian rules football
- Founded: 1904
- Folded: 1954
- No. of teams: 4 (1954), 14 (historical)
- Country: Australia
- Last champion: Sheffield (1954)

The Kentish Football Association was the final name of an Australian rules football competition based in the Kentish region of northern Tasmania.

== History ==
The Kentish FA began life as the Roland Football Association in 1904, with Barrington, Sheffield, Wilmot and Railton comprising the initial roster of clubs. Beulah and Sunnyside both joined in 1905 but only competed for one and two seasons respectively. Barrington won the first three premierships of the competition in a row. The name of the competition in its early years is somewhat unclear - during the early 1910s it is referred to as both the Roland Football Association and Wilmot Football Association seemingly interchangeably, however by 1915 the Roland name seemed to have won out. The competition was abandoned midway through the 1915 season to allow for players to enlist for service in World War I.

The competition returned in 1919 under the Wilmot FA name with Barrington, Roland, Sheffield and Wilmot competing. Roland left after the 1919 season but were replaced by Barrington Rovers, Railton and Staverton for the 1920 season. The two Barrington clubs merged in 1924 in order to create a stronger, united club for the district. Significant changes to football in the Kentish region occurred in 1929, when the KFA was abandoned in favour of fielding a united Kentish team in the NWFU Central Combine competition. This recess would only last a season, with Barrington, Wilmot and the newly-formed Railton-based Cement Rovers re-forming the KFA in 1930. The Association would again enter recess in 1937 and would not return until after WWII.

1945 saw Barrington, West Kentish, Wilmot and Sheffield re-form the association. This line-up of clubs had comprised the backbone of the Association for much of its existence and would remain unchanged until the competition's demise in 1954. West Kentish could not field a team in 1955, which saw the remaining clubs transfer to the NWFA for that season.

== Clubs ==
=== Final ===
Club	Colours	Nickname	Home Ground	Former League	Est.	Years in KFA	KFA Senior Premierships		Fate
Club	Colours	Nickname	Home Ground	Former League	Est.	Years in KFA	Total	Years	Fate
Barrington		Robins	Barrington Football Ground, Barrington	NWFA, WFA	1895	1904-1911, 1919–1928, 1930–1936, 1946–1954	7	1904, 1905, 1906, 1908, 1910, 1933, 1953	Recess between 1912–18 and in 1929. Moved to Latrobe FL in 1937. Moved to NWFA in 1955.
Sheffield	(?-1936)(?-1954)		Sheffield Football Ground, Sheffield	NWFA, LFL	1904	1904-1928, 1931–1932, 1935–1936, 1946–1954	11	1907, 1909, 1911, 1921, 1922, 1925, 1928, 1931, 1948, 1949, 1954	Recess between 1929 and 1930. Joined Latrobe FL in 1933 and 1937. Moved to NWFA in 1955.
West Kentish	Dark with white vee		West Kentish Recreation Ground, West Kentish	WFA	1914	1915, 1927–1928, 1931–1936, 1946- 1954	4	1946, 1950, 1951, 1952	Recess in 1929-30 and 1936, re-formed in Wilmot FA in 1938. Folded after 1954 season
Wilmot		Tigers	Wilmot Football Ground, Wilmot	WFA, NWFA	1896	1904-1909, 1911–1912, 1914, 1919–1928, 1930–1936, 1946–1954	10	1920, 1923, 1924, 1927, 1929, 1930, 1934, 1935, 1936, 1947	Formed Wilmot FA in 1910. Recess in 1929 and 1937. Formed Wilmot FA in 1938. Moved to NWFA in 1946 and 1955

=== Former ===
Club	Colours	Nickname	Home Ground	Former League	Est.	Years in KFA	KFA Senior Premierships		Fate
Club	Colours	Nickname	Home Ground	Former League	Est.	Years in KFA	Total	Years	Fate
Barrington Rovers/Lower Barrington		Rovers	Lower Barrington Recreation Ground, Lower Barrington	NWFA	1909	1910-1915, 1920–1923	3	1912, 1913, 1914	Merged with Barrington in 1924
Barrington Tommies			Barrington Football Ground, Barrington	–	1915	1915	0	-	Folded after 1915 season
Beulah				–	1905	1905	0	-	Entered recess after 1905 season
Cement Rovers	Dark with light vee		Railton Recreation Ground, Railton	LFL	1930	1930, 1933	0	-	Played in Latrobe FL between 1931 and 1932, returned there in 1934
Claude Road			Claude Road Recreation Ground, Claude Road	WFA, KJFA	1907	1910, 1923–1924	0	-	Entered recess in 1911. Folded after 1924 season.
Railton			Railton Recreation Ground, Railton	MFA	1900	1904-1905, 1907, 1911, 1914, 1920–1925	0	-	Entered recess in 1906 and 1912. Moved to Midhurst FA in 1908. Recess between 1915 and 1919. Moved to Latrobe FL in 1926.
Railway			Sheffield Football Ground, Sheffield	–	1912	1912-1913	0	-	Folded after 1913 season
Roland			West Kentish Recreation Ground, West Kentish	–	1919	1919, 1921–1922	0	-	Recess in 1920. Folded after 1922 season
Staverton				–	1919	1920	0	-	Merged with West Kentish to form Roland in 1921
Sunnyside				–	1905	1905-1906	0	-	Entered recess after 1906 season

== Premierships ==
Year	Premier	Score	Runners-up	Notes
Roland Football Association
1904	Barrington	?.? (40) - ?.? (23)	Sheffield	
1905	Barrington	Margin 2 points	Wilmot	
1906	Barrington		Sunnyside	
1907	Sheffield		?	
1908	Barrington		?	
1909	Sheffield	4.10 (34) - 2.6 (18)	Wilmot	
1910	Barrington	3.6 (24) - 1.7 (13)	Sheffield	
Wilmot Football Association
1911	Sheffield		Railton	
1912	Barrington Rovers		?	
1913	Barrington Rovers		?	
1914	Barrington Rovers		Wilmot	
Roland Football Association
1915				Season not completed - no premier
1916-18	Association in recess			
1919	?		?	
1920	Wilmot		?	
1921	Sheffield		?	
1922	Sheffield	3.6 (24) - 3.3 (21)	Barrington Rovers	
1923	Wilmot	4.10 (34) - 4.8 (32)	Sheffield	
1924	Wilmot	7.14 (56) - 5.6 (36)	Barrington	
1925	Sheffield	7.13 (55) - 7.6 (48)	Wilmot	
Kentish Football Association
1926	?		?	
1927	Wilmot	9.19 (73) - 3.4 (22)	Sheffield	
1928	Sheffield	8.9 (57) - 8.8 (56)	Wilmot	
1929	Association in recess			
1930	Wilmot		?	
1931	Sheffield	8.4 (52) - 6.12 (48)	West Kentish	
1932	Sheffield	10.8 (68) - 7.6 (48)	Wilmot	
1933	Barrington		Cement Rovers	
1934	Wilmot	9.15 (69) - 9.10 (64)	Barrington	
1935	Wilmot	8.6 (54) - 4.11 (35)	Sheffield	
1936	Wilmot	10.12 (72) - 8.7 (55)	West Kentish	
1937-45	Association in recess			
1946	West Kentish	8.4 (52) - 4.6 (30)	Barrington	
1947	Wilmot	9.14 (68) - 9.9 (63)	Sheffield	
1948	Sheffield		Barrington	
1949	Sheffield		Barrington	
1950	West Kentish	9.14 (68) - 7.9 (51)	Barrington	
1951	West Kentish	5.14 (44) - 5.6 (36)	Barrington	
1952	West Kentish	8.17 (65) - 2.10 (22)	Barrington	
1953	Barrington	4.8 (32) - 4.3 (27)	Sheffield	
1954	Sheffield	15.18 (108) - 4.8 (32)	Barrington	
