= Central Football Association =

Australian rules football league

- Most recent season or competition: 1945
- Sport: Australian rules football
- Founded: 1919
- First season: 1919
- Folded: 1945
- No. of teams: 5 (1945), 10 (historical)
- Country: Australia
- Last champion: Bracknell (1945)
- Most titles: Deloraine (6)
- Related competitions: Deloraine FA

The Central Football Association was an Australian rules football competition based around the towns of Westbury and Deloraine in northern Tasmania.

== History ==
The Central Football Association was formed in 1919 with 3 clubs - Deloraine, Dunorlan and Westbury. These three clubs would remain the core members of the Association, with a number of other clubs playing for brief periods during the Association's existence. Hagley played for one season in 1923, Longford for two in 1924–1925, and Cressy for one in 1926. The Central FA went into recess between 1929 and 1931 when Deloraine played in the NWFU Central Combine competition.

The CFA would be re-formed in 1932 with Deloraine, Westbury and Weegena as the main clubs, Weegena being a renamed Dunorlan. They would be joined by Dairy Plains for one season in 1933 when the Chudleigh FA was in recess. The CFA again entered recess after the 1934 season.

The final iteration of the Central Football Association existed for only two seasons, in 1944 and 1945. Deloraine, Elizabeth Town and Westbury re-formed the Association in 1944. They would be joined by Bracknell in 1945, who controversially moved from the Esk Football Association and won the premiership in their first season. The Central Football Association disbanded after the 1945 season, as Bracknell returned to the Esk FA, Elizabeth joined the Central Junior Football Association and Westbury and Deloraine both moved to the NTFA seconds competition.

== Clubs ==
=== Final ===
Club	Colours	Nickname	Home Ground	Former League	Est.	Years in CFA	CFA Senior Premierships		Fate
Club	Colours	Nickname	Home Ground	Former League	Est.	Years in CFA	Total	Years	Fate
Bracknell		Redlegs	Bracknell Recreation Ground, Bracknell	EFA	1920	1945	1	1945	Returned to Esk FA in 1946
Deloraine		Ramblers	Deloraine Recreation Ground, Deloraine	NWFU, NTSFA	1894	1919-1928, 1932–1934, 1944–1945	6	1925, 1926, 1928, 1932, 1933, 1944	Played in NWFU between 1929 and 1931. Recess between 1935 and 1936, joined Latrobe FL in 1937. Joined NTFA seconds in 1946.
Elizabeth Town		Eagles	Paddock in Elizabeth Town	ETFA	1925	1944-1945	0	-	Joined Central Junior FA in 1946
Hagley Juniors		Robins	Hagley Recreation Ground, Hagley	–	1901	1945	0	-	Joined Central Junior FA in 1946
Westbury	(1928)(1944–45)	Tigers	Westbury Recreation Ground, Westbury	–	1902	1919-1928, 1932–1934, 1944–1945	2	1923, 1927	Unaffiliated between 1929 and 1931. Unaffiliated/in recess between 1935 and 1943. Joined NTFA seconds in 1946.

=== Former ===
Club	Colours	Nickname	Home Ground	Former League	Est.	Years in EFA	EFA Senior Premierships		Fate
Club	Colours	Nickname	Home Ground	Former League	Est.	Years in EFA	Total	Years	Fate
Cressy			Cressy Recreation Ground, Cressy	EFA	1921	1926	0	-	Did not affiliate with a competition in 1927
Dairy Plains				CFA	1931	1933	0	-	Returned to Chudleigh FA in 1934
Hagley			Hagley Recreation Ground, Hagley	–	1901	1923	0	-	Did not affiliate with a competition in 1924
Longford			Longford Recreation Ground, Longford	EFA	1878	1924-1925	1	1924	Moved to NTFA in 1926
Weegena (Dunorlan 1920-28)	Dark and light hoops (1920s)			ETFA, CFA	1902	1919-1924, 1927–1928, 1932–1934	1	1922	Moved to Elizabeth Town FA in 1925. Moved to Dunorlan FA in 1929 and 1935

== Premierships ==
Year	Premier	Score	Runners-up	Notes
1919				
1920				
1921				
1922	Dunorlan			
1923	Westbury			
1924	Longford		Westbury	Longford were awarded the premiership when Westbury forfeited the final.
1925	Deloraine	8.11 (59) - 4.11 (35)	Longford	
1926	Deloraine		Westbury	
1927	Westbury	9.14 (68) - 5.12 (42)	Deloraine	
1928	Deloraine			
1929-31	CFA in recess			
1932	Deloraine	11.12 (78) - 6.11 (47)	Westbury	
1933	Deloraine	7.9 (51) - 5.2 (32)	Weegena	
1934				
1935-44	CFA in recess			
1944	Deloraine	7.7 (49) - 7.6 (48)	Westbury	
1945	Bracknell	6.16 (52) - 7.8 (50)	Deloraine	
