= Esk-Deloraine Football Association =

Australian rules football league

Esk-Deloraine Football League
- Most recent season or competition: 1997
- Sport: Australian rules football
- Founded: 1984
- First season: 1984
- Folded: 1997
- No. of teams: 10 (1997), 13 (historical)
- Country: Australia
- Last champion: Bracknell (1997)
- Most titles: Perth Rovers (6)
- Related competitions: Esk FA; Deloraine FA

The Esk-Deloraine Football Association was an Australian rules football competition based in the Northern Midlands and Meander Valley regions of Tasmania. The competition ran from 1984 to 1997.

== History ==
The EDFA was formed in 1984, when the long-standing Esk and Deloraine Football Associations merged to form a larger competition. Both competitions had been reduced to 5 clubs, with Meander folding after the 1981 Deloraine FA season and Deloraine departing the Esk FA to join the more powerful NTFA in 1984. With clubs struggling to field two sides it was decided that merging the two competitions would be best for football in the area. Mole Creek and Chudleigh merged prior to the beginning of the season, leaving the competition with 9 teams for its first season.

The first half of the competition's existence was dominated by the Perth Rovers, who won 6 premierships in 7 years between 1984 and 1990, including 5 in a row from 1986 to 1990. Elizabeth Town departed for the NWFA after the 1985 season, while Red Hills folded after 1988. The demise of the Fingal District FA saw Campbell Town, Fingal and St Marys join the EDFA prior to the 1993 season, however Fingal and St Marys struggled during their time in the EDFA, merging in 1995 to form the Valley Saints for 1 season before entering recess a year later.

The EDFA folded after the 1997 season, with most clubs joining the newly-formed Northern Tasmanian Football Association aside from Mole Creek, who joined the NWFA and Westbury, who folded at season's end.

== Clubs ==
=== Final ===
Club	Colours	Nickname	Home Ground	Former League	Est.	Years in EDFA	EDFA Senior Premierships		Fate
Club	Colours	Nickname	Home Ground	Former League	Est.	Years in EDFA	Total	Years	Fate
Bracknell		Redlegs	Bracknell Recreation Ground, Bracknell	EFA	1920	1984-1997	3	1985, 1994, 1997	Moved to NTFA in 1998
Campbell Town		Robins	Campbell Town Recreation Ground, Campbell Town	FDFA	1886	1993-1997	0	-	Moved to NTFA in 1998
Cressy		Bulldogs	Cressy Recreation Ground, Cressy	EFA	1921	1984-1997	1	1995	Moved to NTFA in 1998
Evandale		Eels	Morven Park, Evandale	EFA	1901	1984-1997	2	1992, 1993	Moved to NTFA in 1998
Hagley		Magpies	Hagley Recreation Ground, Hagley	DFA	1901	1984-1997	1	1991	Moved to NTFA in 1998
Mole Creek (Mole Creek-Chudleigh 1984-?)		Bulldogs	Mole Creek Recreation Ground, Mole Creek	DFA	1920	1984-1997	0	-	Moved to NWFA in 1998
Perth Rovers		Magpies	Perth Recreation Ground, Perth	EFA	1880	1984-1997	6	1984, 1986, 1987, 1988, 1989, 1990	Moved to NTFA in 1998
St Marys		Tigers	St Marys Recreation Ground, St Marys	FDFA	1890	1993-1994, 1997	0	-	Merged with Fingal to form Valley Saints in 1995, re-formed in 1997. Moved to NTFA in 1998
Westbury		Tigers	Westbury Recreation Ground, Westbury	EFA	1902	1984-1997	1	1996	Folded after 1997 season

=== Former ===
Club	Colours	Nickname	Home Ground	Former League	Est.	Years in EDFA	EDFA Senior Premierships		Fate
Club	Colours	Nickname	Home Ground	Former League	Est.	Years in EDFA	Total	Years	Fate
Elizabeth Town	(1984)(1985)	Eagles	Railton Recreation Reserve, Railton	DFA	1925	1984-1985	0	-	Moved to NWFA in 1986
Fingal		Blues	Fingal Recreation Ground, Fingal	FDFA	1884	1993-1994	0	-	Merged with St Marys to form Valley Saints in 1995. Re-formed in NEFU in 1997
Red Hills		Wrens, Blues, Hills	Red Hills Recreation Ground, Red Hills	DFA	1948	1984-1988	0	-	Folded after 1988 season
Valley Saints		Saints	Fingal Recreation Ground, Fingal and St Marys Recreation Ground, St Marys	–	1995	1995	0	-	Entered recess in 1996, both St Marys and Fingal re-formed in 1997.

== Premierships ==
Year	Premier	Score	Runners-Up
1984	Perth Rovers	14.10 (94) - 6.12 (48)	Westbury
1985	Bracknell	19.14 (128) - 9.13 (67)	Perth Rovers
1986	Perth Rovers	8.12 (60) - 6.6 (42)	Hagley
1987	Perth Rovers	15.17 (107) - 6.6 (42)	Bracknell
1988	Perth Rovers	17.9 (111) - 10.6 (66)	Cressy
1989	Perth Rovers	28.3 (146) - 16.7 (103)	Evandale
1990	Perth Rovers	11.16 (82) - 11.12 (78)	Bracknell
1991	Hagley	14.10 (94) - 8.10 (58)	Evandale
1992	Evandale	20.9 (129) - 17.6 (108)	Hagley
1993	Evandale	25.11 (161) - 17.5 (107)	Hagley
1994	Bracknell	13.14 (92) - 7.15 (57)	Hagley
1995	Cressy	11.16 (82) - 9.15 (69)	Evandale
1996	Westbury	14.13 (97) - 13.7 (85)	Hagley
1997	Bracknell	15.10 (100) - 11.8 (74)	Hagley
