= Esk Football Association =

Australian rules football league

- Most recent season or competition: 1983
- Sport: Australian rules football
- Founded: 1930
- First season: 1930
- Folded: 1983
- No. of teams: 6 (1989), 13 (historical)
- Country: Australia
- Last champion: Perth (1983)
- Most titles: Bracknell (17)
- Related competitions: Esk-Deloraine FA; Deloraine FA

The Esk Football Association was an Australian rules football competition based in the Northern Midlands of Tasmania.

== History ==
Although similar competitions had existed in previously decades, the most recent incarnation of the Esk Football Association was formed in 1930, with Bracknell, Cressy and Longford Juniors competing in the first season. Evandale joined the EFA for the first time in 1933, winning the premiership in their first season. Evandale and Perth played sporadically in the EFA during the 1930s. Perth first joined in 1935, did not form for the 1938 season but returned a year later. The EFA went into recess after the 1940 season due to WWII.

When the competition re-formed in 1945, controversy reared when Bracknell failed to supply delegates to a pre-season meeting on account of supposed difficulties in paying for their transport to the meeting, leading to the club's exclusion from the Association for the 1945 season. The club would play in the Central Football Association in 1945, before re-joining the Esk FA a year later along with Evandale and two new clubs - Hagley and Bishopsbourne. Longford Juniors would depart for the NTFA seconds competition after winning the 1947 premiership. Carrick joined from the Esk Seconds FA in 1952, while Bishopsbourne merged with Bracknell in 1953 after a year in recess.

The 1950s and 60s were dominated by Bracknell, which established itself as the power club of the competition by winning 9 premierships in 10 years between 1956 and 1965, including 7 in a row between 1959 and 1965. Poatina joined for a brief period in the early 1960s, while Carrick folded around the same time. The Esk FA was bolstered by the admission of Westbury from the Northern Tasmanian District Football League in 1964 and Deloraine from the Northern Amateurs in 1968, which offset the loss of Hagley to recessin 1966. Meander joined from the Deloraine Football Association in the late 1960s but returned by 1976. Ross also briefly played from 1972 to 1979 following the disbanding of the Midlands Football League.

A dwindling number of players in the area, along with the admission of Deloraine to the NTFA in 1984, saw the Esk FA merge with the Deloraine FA after the 1983 season to form the Esk-Deloraine FA.

== Clubs ==
=== Final ===
Club	Colours	Nickname	Home Ground	Former League	Est.	Years in EFA	EFA Senior Premierships		Fate
Club	Colours	Nickname	Home Ground	Former League	Est.	Years in EFA	Total	Years	Fate
Bracknell (Bracknell-Bishopsbourne 1953-?)		Redlegs	Bracknell Recreation Ground, Bracknell	CFA	1920	1930-1940, 1946–1983	17	1931, 1937, 1938, 1939, 1940, 1946, 1949, 1956, 1957, 1959, 1960, 1961, 1962, 1963, 1964, 1965, 1982	Played in Central FA in 1945. Formed Esk-Deloraine FA in 1984
Cressy		Bulldogs	Cressy Recreation Ground, Cressy	CFA	1921	1930-1983	6	1932, 1934, 1935, 1936, 1967, 1969	Formed Esk-Deloraine FA in 1984
Deloraine		Magpies	Deloraine Recreation Ground, Deloraine	TAFL	1894	1968-1983	6	1968, 1973, 1975, 1976, 1978, 1979	Moved to NTFA in 1984
Evandale		Eels	Morven Park, Evandale	–	1901	1933-1935, 1938–1940, 1946–1983	6	1933, 1955, 1958, 1970, 1974, 1977	Formed Esk-Deloraine FA in 1984
Perth		Magpies	Perth Sports Grounds, Perth	–	1880	1935-1937, 1939, 1945–1954, 1960–1983	3	1945, 1971, 1983	Recess between 1955 and 1959. Formed Esk-Deloraine FA in 1984
Westbury		Tigers	Westbury Recreation Ground, Westbury	NTDFL	1902	1964-1983	4	1966, 1972, 1980, 1981	Formed Esk-Deloraine FA in 1984

=== Former ===
Club	Colours	Nickname	Home Ground	Former League	Est.	Years in EFA	EFA Senior Premierships		Fate
Club	Colours	Nickname	Home Ground	Former League	Est.	Years in EFA	Total	Years	Fate
Bishopsbourne			Bishopsbourne Recreation Ground, Bishopsbourne	–	1946	1946-1951	1	1948	Folded partway through 1951 season. Merged with Bracknell in 1953.
Carrick			Carrick Memorial Recreation Ground, Carrick	ESFA	1949	1952-?	0	-	Folded
Hagley		Robins	Hagley Recreation Ground, Hagley	CFA	1901	1946-1965	5	1950, 1951, 1952, 1953, 1954	Entered recess in 1966. Re-formed in Deloraine FA in 1970.
Longford Juniors	(1930-?)(?-1947)	Tigers	Longford Recreation Ground, Longford	–	1878	1930-1947	2	1930, 1947	Moved to NTFA seconds in 1948
Meander		Robins	Meander Recreation Ground, Meander	DFA	1924	Late '60s-1975	0	-	Returned to Deloraine FA in 1976
Poatina		Tigers	Poatina Recreation Ground, Poatina	–	1959	1959-1963	0	-	Folded after 1963 season
Ross		Demons	Ross Recreation Ground, Ross	MFA	1878	1972-1979	0	-	Moved to Oatlands District FA in 1980

== Premierships ==
Year	Premier	Score	Runners-up
1930	Longford Juniors		
1931	Bracknell	5.8 (38) - 5.4 (34)	Longford Juniors
1932	Cressy	9.15 (69) - 5.13 (43)	Bracknell
1933	Evandale	11.15 (81) - 9.12 (66)	Bracknell
1934	Cressy	11.13 (79) - 5.12 (42)	Evandale
1935	Cressy	8.9 (57) - 6.7 (43)	Evandale
1936	Cressy	8.12 (60) - 6.13 (49)	Perth
1937	Bracknell	6.11 (47) - 6.7 (43)	Longford Juniors
1938	Bracknell	10.11 (71) - 8.12 (60)	Longford Juniors
1939	Bracknell	9.11 (65) - 4.8 (32)	Cressy
1940	Bracknell	14.17 (101) - 7.11 (53)	Cressy
1941-44	EFA in recess (WWII)		
1945	Perth	7.8 (50) - 7.7 (49)	Cressy
1946	Bracknell	11.18 (84) - 7.10 (52)	Cressy
1947	Longford Juniors	12.12 (84) - 10.5 (65)	Bishopsbourne
1948	Bishopsbourne	10.11 (71) - 8.8 (56)	Cressy
1949	Bracknell	12.10 (82) - 6.3 (39)	Cressy
1950	Hagley	7.4 (46) - 4.14 (38)	Bishopsbourne
1951	Hagley	11.8 (74) - 6.16 (52)	Cressy
1952	Hagley	10.15 (75) - 10.7 (67)	Perth
1953	Hagley	11.10 (76) - 11.8 (74)	Perth
1954	Hagley	11.10 (76) - 9.13 (67)	Cressy
1955	Evandale	8.8 (56) - 5.8 (38)	Cressy
1956	Bracknell	14.10 (94) - 6.7 (43)	Evandale
1957	Bracknell	14.7 (91) - 7.11 (53)	Hagley
1958	Evandale	12.20 (92) - 12.10 (82)	Hagley
1959	Bracknell	13.14 (92) - 6.12 (48)	Cressy
1960	Bracknell	13.9 (87) - 6.8 (44)	Cressy
1961	Bracknell	16.28 (124) - 8.15 (63)	Poatina
1962	Bracknell	9.10 (64) - 8.9 (57)	Poatina
1963	Bracknell	11.14 (80) - 11.13 (79)	Poatina
1964	Bracknell	12.19 (91) - 6.4 (40)	Perth
1965	Bracknell	9.6 (60) - 8.6 (54)	Cressy
1966	Westbury	12.15 (87) - 12.12 (84)	Cressy
1967	Cressy	8.9 (57) - 8.4 (52)	Westbury
1968	Deloraine	6.16 (52) - 7.6 (48)	Cressy
1969	Cressy	12.8 (80) - 7.14 (56)	Bracknell
1970	Evandale	8.16 (64) - 5.12 (42)	Perth
1971	Perth	11.11 (77) - 10.8 (68)	Deloraine
1972	Westbury	6.21 (57) - 4.6 (30)	Cressy
1973	Deloraine	13.9 (87) - 8.12 (60)	Evandale
1974	Evandale	10.8 (68) - 9.9 (63)	Cressy
1975	Deloraine	8.6 (54) - 5.9 (39)	Evandale
1976	Deloraine	10.12 (72) - 7.14 (56)	Perth
1977	Bracknell	12.21 (93) - 11.8 (74)	Westbury
1978	Deloraine	11.8 (74) - 6.9 (45)	Bracknell
1979	Deloraine	19.12 (126) - 9.11 (65)	Perth
1980	Westbury	7.19 (61) - 8.11 (59)	Bracknell
1981	Westbury	11.6 (72) - 10.10 (70)	Bracknell
1982	Bracknell	17.7 (109) - 13.9 (87)	Deloraine
1983	Perth	12.15 (87) - 11.8 (74)	Deloraine
