= Northern Tasmanian Football Association (1996) =

Australian rules football competition

- Current season, competition or edition: 2024
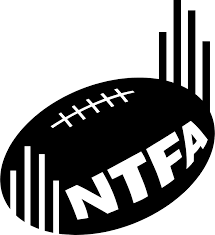
- Sport: Australian rules football
- Founded: 1996
- President: Peter Gutwein
- No. of teams: 22
- Country: Australia
- Region: Northern Tasmania
- Most recent champions: Premier: North Launceston; Division 1: Rocherlea; Division 2: East Coast Swans (2025)
- Most titles: George Town, Old Scotch Collegians (8)
- Sponsor: James Boag (Boags)
- Website: ntfa.org.au

The Northern Tasmanian Football Association is an Australian rules football competition in northern Tasmania. This league is not related to the older version of the NTFA, which merged in 1987 with the NWFU to form the Northern Tasmanian Football League.

This NTFA was formed in 1996 as a replacement of the Northern Section of the Tasmanian Amateur Football League. In 1996 the Tasmanian Amateurs voted to allow the payment of players. As players were allowed to be paid then they were no longer an amateur competition. The board decided to adopt the name "Northern Tasmanian Football Association" because it was available and the former NTFA hadn't used the name for ten years.

In 1998 seven clubs from the defunct Esk-Deloraine FA joined the competition.

== Clubs ==
=== Locations ===
Club locations - Launceston and surrounds
Red = Premier
Yellow = Division 1
Blue = Division 2
Club locations - Greater North East Tasmania

=== Men ===
==== Premier Division ====
Until 2018, it was known as Division One.

Club	Colours	Nickname	Home Ground	Former League	Est.	Years in NTFA	NTFA Premierships	
Club	Colours	Nickname	Home Ground	Former League	Est.	Years in NTFA	Total	Years
Deloraine		Kangaroos	Deloraine Recreation Ground, Deloraine	NWFL	1894	2004-	1	2020
Launceston		Blues	Windsor Park, Riverside	TSL	1875	2025-	0	-
Longford		Tigers	Longford Recreation Ground, Longford	TAFL	1878	1996-	1	2022
North Launceston		Bombers	York Park, Invermay	TSL	1893	2025-	1	2025
Scottsdale		Magpies	Scottsdale Recreation Ground, Scottsdale	NWFL	1889	2000-	1	2001
South Launceston		Bulldogs	Youngtown Memorial Oval, Youngtown	TSL	1986	2014-	5	2014, 2015, 2017, 2018, 2024

==== Division 1 ====
Until 2018, it was known as Division Two.

Club	Colours	Nickname	Home Ground	Former League	Est.	Years in NTFA	NTFA Premierships	
Club	Colours	Nickname	Home Ground	Former League	Est.	Years in NTFA	Total	Years
Bracknell		Redlegs	Bracknell Recreation Ground, Bracknell	EDFA	1920s	1998-	1	2021
Bridgenorth		Parrots	Bridgenorth Recreation Ground, Bridgenorth	TAFL	1923	1996-	2	1996, 2010
George Town		Saints	George Town Sports Complex, George Town	TAFL	1927	1996-	8	2002, 2003, 2004, 2005, 2006, 2007, 2008, 2009
Hillwood		Sharks	Hillwood Recreation Reserve, Hillwood	TAFL	1927	1996-	3	1999, 2000, 2019
Lilydale		Demons	Lilydale Recreation Ground, Lilydale	NEFU	1921	2011-	4	2012, 2017, 2019, 2021
Old Launcestonians		Blues	Invermay Park, Invermay	TAFL	1931	1996-	1	1997
Old Scotch Collegians		Thistles	NTCA Ground, Launceston	TAFL	1935	1996-	8	2009, 2010, 2013, 2014, 2015, 2016, 2023, 2024
Rocherlea		Tigers, Rockapes	Rocherlea Football Oval, Rocherlea	TAFL	1951	1996-	6	2011, 2012, 2013, 2016, 2023, 2025
St Patrick's Old Collegians		Saints	John Cunningham Memorial Oval, Prospect	TAFL	1931	1996-	5	1996, 1999, 2002, 2004, 2022

==== Division Two ====
Club	Colours	Nickname	Home Ground	Former League	Est.	Years in NTFA	NTFA Premierships	
Club	Colours	Nickname	Home Ground	Former League	Est.	Years in NTFA	Total	Years
Bridport		Seagulls	Bridport Oval, Bridport	NEFU	1934	2017-2021, 2023	0	-
Campbell Town		Robins	Campbell Town Recreation Ground, Campbell Town	EDFA, ODFA	1886	1998-2006, 2025-	3	Div 2: 1998, 2000, 2001
East Coast Swans		Swans	St Helens Recreation Reserve, St Helens and Pyengana Recreation Reserve, Pyengana	NEFU	1910	2017-	2	2018, 2025
Evandale		Eagles	Morven Park, Evandale	EDFA	1892	1998-	0	-
Meander Valley		Suns	Westbury Recreation Ground, Westbury	LFA	2012	2014-	0	-
Perth		Magpies	Perth Sports Grounds, Perth	EDFA	1880	1998-	0	-
University of Tasmania (Uni-Mowbray 1996-2019)		Lions	University Oval, Newnham	TAFL	1923	Div 1: 1996-2003; Div 2: 2004-	5	Div 1: 1997, 1998; Div 2: 2005, 2006, 2011

=== Women ===
==== Premier Division ====
Club	Colours	Nickname	Home Ground	Former League	Est.	Years in NTFA	NTFA Premierships	
Club	Colours	Nickname	Home Ground	Former League	Est.	Years in NTFA	Total	Years
Deloraine		Kangaroos	Deloraine Recreation Ground, Deloraine	–	1894	2021-	1	Division 1: 2023
Launceston		Blues	Windsor Park, Riverside	TSWL	1875	2021-	3	Premier: 2021, 2022, 2025
Longford		Tigers	Longford Recreation Ground, Longford	–	1878	2021-	0	-
North Launceston		Bombers	York Park, Invermay	–	1893	2025-	0	-
Scottsdale		Magpies	Scottsdale Recreation Ground, Scottsdale	TWL	1889	2019-	0	-
South Launceston		Bulldogs	Youngtown Memorial Oval, Youngtown	TWL	1986	2019, 2021-	2	Premier: 2019 Division 1: 2022

==== Women's Division One ====
Club	Colours	Nickname	Home Ground	Former League	Est.	Years in NTFA	NTFA Premierships	
Club	Colours	Nickname	Home Ground	Former League	Est.	Years in NTFA	Total	Years
Bridgenorth		Parrots	Bridgenorth Recreation Ground, Bridgenorth	–	1923	2019-	2	Premier: 2024 Division 1: 2025
George Town		Saints	George Town Sports Complex, George Town	TWL	1927	2019, 2021-	0	-
Hillwood		Sharks	Hillwood Recreation Reserve, Hillwood	–	1927	2021-	0	-
Meander Valley		Suns	Westbury Recreation Ground, Westbury	–	2012	2019-	1	Division 1: 2024
Old Launcestonians		Blues	Invermay Park, Invermay	–	1931	2019-	2	Premier: 2020, 2023
Old Scotch Collegians		Thistles	NTCA Ground, Launceston	–	1935	2019, 2021-	0	-
St Patrick's Old Collegians		Saints	John Cunningham Memorial Oval, Prospect	–	1931	2024-	0	-

=== Former ===
Club	Colours	Nickname	Home Ground	Former League	Est.	Years in NTFA	NTFA Premierships		Fate
Club	Colours	Nickname	Home Ground	Former League	Est.	Years in NTFA	Total	Years	Fate
Cressy		Bulldogs	Cressy Recreation Ground, Cressy	EDFA	1921	1998-2000	0	-	Folded after 2000 season
Fingal Valley	(?-2007-?)(?-2015)	Country Blues	Fingal Recreation Ground, Fingal	FDFA, NEFU	1884	1996, 2002-2015	2	2007, 2008	Moved to NEFU in 1997, returned in 2002. Folded after 2015 season
Hagley		Magpies	Hagley Recreation Ground, Hagley	EDFA	1895	1998-2001	0	-	Folded after 2001 season
Northern Districts		Crows	Karoola Recreation Ground, Karoola	TAFL	1985	1996-2000	0	-	Folded after 2000 season
Prospect Hawks		Hawks	Prospect Park, Prospect	–	2011	2011-2017	0	-	Folded after 2018 season
St Marys		Tigers	St Marys Recreation Ground, St Marys	EDFA	1890	1998-2002	0	-	Folded after 2002 season
Tamar Cats	(1996-?)(?-2019)	Cats	Beauty Point Recreation Ground, Beauty Point	TAFL	1989	1996-2019	1	2003	Folded after 2019 season

== Premierships ==
=== Men ===
Year	Premier (Div. 1 before 2018)	Division 1 (Div. 2 before 2018)	Division 2
1996	Bridgenorth	St Patrick's	2 divisions (1996-2024
1997	Uni-Mowbray	Old Launcestonians	2 divisions (1996-2024
1998	Uni-Mowbray	Campbell Town	2 divisions (1996-2024
1999	Hillwood	St Patrick's	2 divisions (1996-2024
2000	Hillwood	Campbell Town	2 divisions (1996-2024
2001	Scottsdale	Campbell Town	2 divisions (1996-2024
2002	George Town	St Patrick's	2 divisions (1996-2024
2003	George Town	Tamar Cats	2 divisions (1996-2024
2004	George Town	St Patrick's	2 divisions (1996-2024
2005	George Town	Uni-Mowbray	2 divisions (1996-2024
2006	George Town	Uni-Mowbray	2 divisions (1996-2024
2007	George Town	Fingal Valley	2 divisions (1996-2024
2008	George Town	Fingal Valley	2 divisions (1996-2024
2009	George Town	Old Scotch	2 divisions (1996-2024
2010	Bridgenorth	Old Scotch	2 divisions (1996-2024
2011	Rocherlea	Uni-Mowbray	2 divisions (1996-2024
2012	Rocherlea	Lilydale	2 divisions (1996-2024
2013	Rocherlea	Old Scotch	2 divisions (1996-2024
2014	South Launceston	Old Scotch	2 divisions (1996-2024
2015	South Launceston	Old Scotch	2 divisions (1996-2024
2016	Rocherlea	Old Scotch	2 divisions (1996-2024
2017	South Launceston	Lilydale	2 divisions (1996-2024
2018	South Launceston	East Coast Swans	2 divisions (1996-2024
2019	Hillwood	Lilydale	2 divisions (1996-2024
2020	Deloraine	No competition due to COVID-19	2 divisions (1996-2024
2021	Bracknell	Lilydale	2 divisions (1996-2024
2022	Longford	St Patrick's	2 divisions (1996-2024
2023	Rocherlea	Old Scotch	2 divisions (1996-2024
2024	South Launceston	Old Scotch	2 divisions (1996-2024
2025	North Launceston	Rocherlea	East Coast Swans

=== Women ===
Year	Premier	Division 1
2019	South Launceston	1 division (2019-2021)
2020	Old Launcestonians	1 division (2019-2021)
2021	Launceston	1 division (2019-2021)
2022	Launceston	South Launceston
2023	Old Launcestonians	Deloraine
2024	Bridgenorth	Meander Valley
2025	Launceston	Bridgenorth

== Competition ==
The current competition consists of 18 rounds, with each club playing 16 games, followed by 4 rounds of finals.

== Premier Division ==
=== 2007 ===
2007 NTFA Division 1 standings
Team	Wins	Draws	Losses	For	Against	Percentage	Points
George Town	16	0	2	1950	1111	175.52%	64
Longford	15	0	3	2026	1009	200.79%	60
Bracknell	11	0	7	1892	1594	118.70%	44
Deloraine	10	0	8	1783	1440	123.82%	40
Bridgenorth	8	0	10	1697	1604	105.80%	32
Scottsdale	6	0	12	1480	1685	87.83%	24
Hillwood	5	0	13	1291	2172	59.44%	20
Rocherlea	1	0	17	1078	2464	43.75%	4

2007 NTFA Division 1 finals
Game	Team 1	Team 2
Elimination final	Deloraine 12.14 (86)	Bridgenorth 15.11 (101)
Qualifying final	Bracknell 15.3 (93)	Longford 17.17 (119)
1st semi-final	Bracknell 13.11 (89)	Bridgenorth 19.14 (128)
2nd semi-final	George Town 11.12 (78)	Longford 15.16 (106)
Preliminary final	George Town 26.14 (170)	Bridgenorth 9.9 (63)
Grand final	George Town 16.11 (107)	Longford 11.13 (79)

=== 2008 ===
NTFA Div 1	Wins	Byes	Losses	Draws	For	Against	%	Pts	Final	Team	G	B	Pts	Team	G	B	Pts
George Town	16	0	2	0	1860	1130	164.60%	64	Elimination	Bracknell	15	9	99	Rocherlea	13	10	88
Longford	13	0	5	0	1989	1161	171.32%	52	Qualifying	Longford	17	14	116	Scottsdale	13	6	84
Scottsdale	11	0	7	0	1829	1356	134.88%	44	1st Semi	Bracknell	10	13	73	Scottsdale	9	12	66
Bracknell	11	0	7	0	1706	1569	108.73%	44	2nd Semi	George Town	15	8	98	Longford	12	8	80
Rocherlea	8	0	10	0	1941	1774	109.41%	32	Preliminary	Bracknell	13	10	88	Longford	10	12	72
Deloraine	7	0	11	0	1540	1752	87.90%	28	Grand	George Town	13	11	89	Bracknell	6	11	47
Bridgenorth	6	0	12	0	1343	1835	73.19%	24									
Hillwood	0	0	18	0	886	2517	35.20%	0									

=== 2009 ===
NTFA Div 1	Wins	Byes	Losses	Draws	For	Against	%	Pts	Final	Team	G	B	Pts	Team	G	B	Pts
Rocherlea	15	0	2	1	2259	1314	171.92%	62	Elimination	George Town	7	8	50	Scottsdale	6	4	40
George Town	14	0	4	0	1842	1261	146.07%	56	Qualifying	Bridgenorth	10	11	71	Bracknell	10	9	69
Scottsdale	13	0	5	0	1722	1239	138.98%	52	1st Semi	Bridgenorth	18	12	120	Scottsdale	9	14	68
Bridgenorth	9	0	9	0	1692	1487	113.79%	36	2nd Semi	Rocherlea	17	10	112	George Town	14	10	94
Bracknell	9	0	9	0	1671	1738	96.14%	36	Preliminary	George Town	13	8	86	Bridgenorth	5	20	50
Longford	7	0	11	0	1477	1574	93.84%	28	Grand	George Town	16	13	109	Rocherlea	15	17	107
Deloraine	2	0	15	1	1098	1935	56.74%	10									
Hillwood	2	0	16	0	974	2187	44.54%	8									

=== 2010 ===
NTFA Div 1	Wins	Byes	Losses	Draws	For	Against	%	Pts	Final	Team	G	B	Pts	Team	G	B	Pts
Bridgenorth	15	0	3	0	2038	1247	163.43%	60	Elimination	Scottsdale	11	12	78	George Town	6	6	42
Rocherlea	13	0	5	0	2050	1661	123.42%	52	Qualifying	Rocherlea	20	13	133	Bracknell	13	13	91
Bracknell	12	0	5	1	1765	1589	111.08%	50	1st Semi	Scottsdale	15	15	105	Bracknell	10	12	72
George Town	9	0	8	1	1557	1431	108.81%	38	2nd Semi	Bridgenorth	22	20	152	Rocherlea	8	8	56
Scottsdale	8	0	10	0	1429	1607	88.92%	32	Preliminary	Scottsdale	7	8	50	Rocherlea	6	10	46
Deloraine	6	0	10	2	1479	1639	90.24%	28	Grand	Bridgenorth	17	14	116	Scottsdale	7	10	52
Longford	5	0	12	1	1509	1607	93.90%	22									
Hillwood	1	0	16	1	1025	2071	49.49%	6									

=== 2011 ===
NTFA Div 1	Wins	Byes	Losses	Draws	For	Against	%	Pts	Final	Team	G	B	Pts	Team	G	B	Pts
Rocherlea	18	0	0	0	2592	1060	244.53%	72	Elimination	Longford	12	15	87	Bracknell	10	10	70
Bridgenorth	14	0	4	0	2215	1204	183.97%	56	Qualifying	Bridgenorth	12	12	84	George Town	7	8	50
George Town	12	0	6	0	1515	1452	104.34%	48	1st Semi	George Town	16	10	106	Longford	8	6	54
Longford	10	0	8	0	1594	1661	95.97%	40	2nd Semi	Rocherlea	16	9	105	Bridgenorth	10	13	73
Bracknell	9	0	9	0	1605	1837	87.37%	36	Preliminary	Bridgenorth	19	12	126	George Town	12	13	85
Hillwood	5	0	13	0	1348	1859	72.51%	20	Grand	Rocherlea	23	15	153	Bridgenorth	9	14	68
Scottsdale	2	0	16	0	1272	2049	62.08%	8									
Deloraine	2	0	16	0	1079	2098	51.43%	8									

=== 2012 ===
NTFA Div 1	Wins	Byes	Losses	Draws	For	Against	%	Pts	Final	Team	G	B	Pts	Team	G	B	Pts
Rocherlea	16	0	2	0	2190	1091	200.73%	64	Elimination	Longford	13	9	87	George Town	5	3	33
Bridgenorth	15	0	3	0	2064	1001	206.19%	60	Qualifying	Bridgenorth	14	15	99	Bracknell	4	9	33
Bracknell	10	0	7	1	1683	1284	131.07%	42	1st Semi	Bracknell	16	13	109	Longford	7	9	51
Longford	10	0	8	0	1518	1507	100.73%	40	2nd Semi	Rocherlea	15	14	104	Bridgenorth	12	15	87
George Town	9	0	8	1	1544	1356	113.86%	38	Preliminary	Bridgenorth	10	15	75	Bracknell	12	8	80
Hillwood	8	0	10	0	1391	1750	79.49%	32	Grand	Rocherlea	21	16	142	Bracknell	8	9	57
Scottsdale	2	0	16	0	959	2097	45.73%	8									
Deloraine	1	0	17	0	1040	2303	45.16%	4									

=== 2013 ===
NTFA Div 1	Wins	Byes	Losses	Draws	For	Against	%	Pts	Final	Team	G	B	Pts	Team	G	B	Pts
Rocherlea	16	0	1	1	2172	1151	188.71%	66	Elimination	George Town	12	9	81	Bracknell	9	13	67
Hillwood	13	0	4	1	1976	1244	158.84%	54	Qualifying	Bridgenorth	9	13	67	Hillwood	4	9	33
Bridgenorth	12	0	6	0	1881	1203	156.36%	48	1st Semi	Hillwood	16	10	106	George Town	13	8	86
George Town	11	0	7	0	1447	1351	107.11%	44	2nd Semi	Rocherlea	21	7	133	Bridgenorth	11	12	78
Bracknell	8	0	10	0	1538	1600	96.13%	32	Preliminary	Bridgenorth	14	12	96	Hillwood	13	12	90
Longford	7	0	11	0	1504	1561	96.35%	28	Grand	Rocherlea	24	13	157	Bridgenorth	11	14	80
Deloraine	3	0	15	0	967	2156	44.85%	12									
Scottsdale	1	0	17	0	851	2070	41.11%	4									

=== 2014 ===
NTFA Div 1	Wins	Byes	Losses	Draws	For	Against	%	Pts	Final	Team	G	B	Pts	Team	G	B	Pts
South Launceston	15	0	1	0	1857	951	195.27%	60	Elimination	Hillwood	13	16	94	Rocherlea	12	17	89
Bridgenorth	14	0	2	0	2069	952	217.33%	56	Qualifying	Deloraine	12	12	84	Bridgenorth	9	17	71
Deloraine	11	0	5	0	1478	1129	130.91%	44	1st Semi	Hillwood	20	19	139	Bridgenorth	10	8	68
Hillwood	9	0	7	0	1722	1115	154.44%	36	2nd Semi	South Launceston	15	9	99	Deloraine	11	5	71
Rocherlea	8	0	8	0	1598	1428	111.90%	32	Preliminary	Deloraine	14	12	96	Hillwood	12	11	83
Longford	6	0	10	0	1330	1483	89.68%	24	Grand	South Launceston	16	13	109	Deloraine	8	9	57
Bracknell	6	0	10	0	1340	1749	76.62%	24									
George Town	2	0	14	0	981	2178	45.04%	8									
Scottsdale	1	0	15	0	771	2161	35.68%	4									

=== 2015 ===
NTFA Div 1	Wins	Byes	Losses	Draws	For	Against	%	Pts	Final	Team	G	B	Pts	Team	G	B	Pts
South Launceston	16	0	0	0	1882	795	236.73%	64	Elimination	Bracknell	8	15	63	Rocherlea	8	10	58
Deloraine	14	0	2	0	1461	992	147.28%	56	Qualifying	Bridgenorth	18	11	119	Deloraine	16	9	105
Bridgenorth	10	0	6	0	1556	1159	134.25%	40	1st Semi	Bracknell	14	14	98	Deloraine	9	10	64
Bracknell	9	0	7	0	1564	1314	119.03%	36	2nd Semi	South Launceston	8	16	64	Bridgenorth	4	6	30
Rocherlea	9	0	7	0	1337	1335	100.15%	36	Preliminary	Bridgenorth	22	19	151	Bracknell	5	13	43
Scottsdale	7	0	9	0	1323	1272	104.01%	28	Grand	South Launceston	22	15	147	Bridgenorth	5	4	34
Longford	5	0	11	0	1074	1351	79.50%	20									
Hillwood	2	0	14	0	937	1796	52.17%	8									
George Town	0	0	16	0	905	2025	44.69%	0									

=== 2016 ===
NTFA Div 1	Wins	Byes	Losses	Draws	For	Against	%	Pts	Final	Team	G	B	Pts	Team	G	B	Pts
Rocherlea	15	0	1	0	1657	1003	165.20%	60	Elimination	Scottsdale	13	6	84	Bridgenorth	4	14	38
South Launceston	12	0	4	0	1466	953	153.83%	48	Qualifying	Bracknell	16	10	106	South Launceston	7	8	50
Bracknell	11	0	5	0	1447	1234	117.26%	44	1st Semi	South Launceston	13	9	87	Scottsdale	11	6	72
Bridgenorth	10	0	6	0	1433	1191	120.32%	40	2nd Semi	Rocherlea	15	8	98	Bracknell	5	16	46
Scottsdale	10	0	6	0	1310	1175	111.49%	40	Preliminary	Bridgenorth	14	16	100	South Launceston	15	3	93
Longford	8	0	8	0	1385	1222	113.34%	32	Grand	Rocherlea	13	13	91	Bracknell	11	10	76
George Town	2	0	14	0	985	1477	66.69%	8									
Deloraine	2	0	14	0	1012	1570	64.46%	8									
Hillwood	2	0	14	0	1000	1870	53.48%	8									

=== 2017 ===
NTFA Div 1	Wins	Byes	Losses	Draws	For	Against	%	Pts	Final	Team	G	B	Pts	Team	G	B	Pts
South Launceston	13	0	3	0	1525	898	169.82%	52	Elimination	Rocherlea	12	11	83	Hillwood	6	7	43
Bracknell	13	0	3	0	1489	963	154.62%	52	Qualifying	Bracknell	13	13	91	Scottsdale	6	7	43
Scottsdale	11	0	5	0	1327	1088	121.97%	44	1st Semi	Rocherlea	8	10	58	Scottsdale	3	9	27
Rocherlea	9	0	7	0	1407	1006	139.86%	36	2nd Semi	South Launceston	11	17	83	Bracknell	9	13	67
Hillwood	9	0	7	0	1238	1140	108.60%	36	Preliminary	Bracknell	16	11	107	Rocherlea	10	13	73
Bridgenorth	6	0	10	0	1150	1335	86.14%	24	Grand	South Launceston	11	9	75	Bracknell	6	7	43
Longford	6	0	10	0	1044	1164	89.69%	24									
George Town	3	0	13	0	670	1394	48.06%	12									
Deloraine	2	0	14	0	857	1719	49.85%	8									

=== 2018 ===
NTFA Premier Division	Wins	Byes	Losses	Draws	For	Against	%	Pts	Final	Team	G	B	Pts	Team	G	B	Pts
South Launceston	15	0	0	1	1731	760	227.76%	62	Elimination	Scottsdale	14	6	90	Longford	9	12	66
Bracknell	12	0	4	0	1345	1168	115.15%	48	Qualifying	Bracknell	12	11	83	Hillwood	8	17	65
Hillwood	9	0	7	0	1260	1010	124.75%	36	1st Semi	Scottsdale	14	14	98	Hillwood	11	14	80
Scottsdale	9	0	7	0	1263	1094	115.45%	36	2nd Semi	South Launceston	20	12	132	Bracknell	6	10	46
Longford	8	0	7	1	1276	1019	125.22%	34	Preliminary	Bracknell	16	9	105	Scottsdale	4	4	28
Bridgenorth	8	0	8	0	1391	1262	110.22%	32	Grand	South Launceston	15	8	98	Bracknell	5	16	46
Rocherlea	6	0	10	0	1200	1278	93.90%	24									
Deloraine	3	0	13	0	959	1716	55.89%	12									
George Town	1	0	15	0	627	1745	35.93%	4									

=== 2019 ===
NTFA Premier Division	Wins	Byes	Losses	Draws	For	Against	%	Pts	Final	Team	G	B	Pts	Team	G	B	Pts
Longford	14	0	2	0	1495	762	196.19%	56	Elimination	Rocherlea	17	10	112	South Launceston	6	8	44
Bridgenorth	12	0	4	0	1442	1162	124.10%	48	Qualifying	Bridgenorth	12	8	80	Hillwood	8	10	58
Hillwood	11	0	5	0	1355	999	135.64%	44	1st Semi	Hillwood	15	6	96	Rocherlea	13	14	92
Rocherlea	8	0	8	0	1156	1127	102.57%	32	2nd Semi	Bridgenorth	12	11	83	Longford	7	11	53
South Launceston	8	0	8	0	1216	1238	98.22%	32	Preliminary	Hillwood	11	14	80	Longford	7	11	53
George Town	6	0	10	0	988	1198	82.47%	24	Grand	Hillwood	11	17	83	Bridgenorth	8	12	60
Bracknell	5	0	11	0	963	1321	72.90%	20									
Deloraine	4	0	12	0	934	1248	74.84%	16									
Scottsdale	4	0	12	0	883	1377	64.12%	16									

=== 2021 ===
2021 NTFA Premier Division standings
Team	Wins	Draws	Losses	For	Against	Percentage	Points
South Launceston	13	0	3	1420	739	192.15%	52
Longford	12	0	4	1496	578	258.82%	48
Rocherlea	11	0	5	1579	746	211.66%	44
Bracknell	11	0	5	1409	787	179.03%	44
Deloraine	10	0	6	1056	957	110.34%	40
Bridgenorth	6	0	10	751	1255	59.84%	24
Scottsdale	5	0	11	951	1128	84.31%	20
George Town	3	0	13	503	1855	27.12%	12
Hillwood	1	0	15	655	1775	36.90%	4

2021 NTFA Premier Division finals
Game	Team 1	Team 2
Elimination final	Bracknell 11.14 (80)	Deloraine 1.10 (16)
Qualifying final	Longford 6.9 (45)	Rocherlea 4.5 (29)
1st semi-final	Rocherlea 9.11 (65)	Bracknell 10.11 (71)
2nd semi-final	South Launceston 15.5 (95)	Longford 11.7 (73)
Preliminary final	Longford 6.10 (46)	Bracknell 8.10 (58)
Grand final	South Launceston 7.6 (48)	Bracknell 9.13 (67)

== Division One ==
=== 2007 ===
NTFA Div 2	Wins	Byes	Losses	Draws	For	Against	%	Pts	Final	Team	G	B	Pts	Team	G	B	Pts
Fingal Valley	16	2	0	0	2665	780	341.67%	64	Elimination	Tamar Cats	20	8	128	St Patricks	13	11	89
Old Scotch	13	2	3	0	1902	966	196.89%	52	Qualifying	Uni/mowbray	16	21	117	Old Scotch	13	19	97
University/Mowbray	11	2	5	0	1927	1316	146.43%	44	1st Semi	Old Scotch	19	13	127	Tamar Cats	11	12	78
Tamar Cats	10	2	6	0	1891	1447	130.68%	40	2nd Semi	Uni/mowbray	16	10	106	Fingal	9	11	65
St Patricks	8	2	8	0	1571	1636	96.03%	32	Preliminary	Fingal	13	12	90	Old Scotch	10	7	67
Perth	7	2	9	0	1629	1584	102.84%	28	Grand	Fingal	16	10	106	Uni/Mowbray	9	14	68
Evandale	3	2	13	0	1030	1960	52.55%	12									
Old Launcestonians	3	2	13	0	1023	2425	42.19%	12									
Campbell Town	1	2	15	0	1135	2659	42.69%	4									

=== 2008 ===
NTFA Div 2	Wins	Byes	Losses	Draws	For	Against	%	Pts	Final	Team	G	B	Pts	Team	G	B	Pts
Tamar Cats	12	0	4	0	2244	1187	189.05%	48	Elimination	Perth	19	12	126	St Patricks	8	7	55
Fingal Valley	12	0	4	0	2018	1177	171.45%	48	Qualifying	Fingal Valley	19	8	122	Old Scotch	15	6	96
Old Scotch	12	0	4	0	1937	1160	166.98%	48	1st Semi	Old Scotch	15	12	102	Perth	14	17	101
Perth	11	0	5	0	2290	1307	175.21%	44	2nd Semi	Fingal Valley	16	16	112	Tamar Cats	14	7	91
St Patricks	8	0	8	0	1630	1911	85.30%	32	Preliminary	Tamar Cats	23	11	149	Old Scotch	12	12	84
Evandale	4	0	12	0	1189	2253	52.77%	16	Grand	Fingal Valley	23	13	151	Tamar Cats	10	12	72
University/Mowbray	4	0	12	0	1537	1940	79.23%	16									
Old Launcestonians	1	0	15	0	876	2786	31.44%	4									

=== 2009 ===
NTFA Div 2	Wins	Byes	Losses	Draws	For	Against	%	Pts	Final	Team	G	B	Pts	Team	G	B	Pts
Fingal Valley	14	0	2	0	2132	957	222.78%	56	Elimination	Perth	15	8	98	Tamar cats	14	7	91
Old Scotch	14	0	2	0	2112	981	215.29%	56	Qualifying	Old Scotch	16	5	101	University/Mowbray	7	12	54
University/Mowbray	10	0	6	0	1862	1401	132.91%	40	1st Semi	University/Mowbray	16	9	105	Perth	8	5	53
Perth	10	0	6	0	1907	1647	115.79%	40	2nd Semi	Old Scotch	17	10	112	Fingal Valley	8	9	57
Tamar Cats	8	0	8	0	1813	1504	120.55%	32	Preliminary	Fingal Valley	10	7	67	University/Mowbray	7	9	51
St Patricks	5	0	11	0	1513	1752	86.36%	20	Grand	Old Scotch	6	8	44	Fingal Valley	2	7	19
Evandale	2	0	14	0	1053	2161	48.73%	8									
Old Launcestonians	1	0	15	0	897	2886	31.08%	4									

=== 2010 ===
NTFA Div 2	Wins	Byes	Losses	Draws	For	Against	%	Pts	Final	Team	G	B	Pts	Team	G	B	Pts
Old Scotch	16	0	0	0	2404	723	332.50%	64	Elimination	Fingal Valley	11	14	80	St Patricks	9	7	61
University/Mowbray	11	0	5	0	1526	1464	104.23%	44	Qualifying	University/Mowbray	19	7	121	Perth	13	14	92
Perth	10	0	6	0	1568	1463	107.18%	40	1st Semi	Fingal Valley	10	12	72	Perth	10	10	70
Fingal Valley	8	0	7	1	1303	1346	96.81%	34	2nd Semi	Old Scotch	19	19	133	University/Mowbray	9	2	56
St Patricks	7	0	9	0	1596	1551	102.90%	28	Preliminary	Fingal Valley	12	16	88	University/Mowbray	10	5	65
Tamar Cats	7	0	9	0	1483	1647	90.04%	28	Grand	Old Scotch	9	14	68	Fingal Valley	0	0	0
Evandale	3	0	13	0	1141	1670	68.32%	12									
Old Launcestonians	1	0	14	1	971	2128	45.63%	6									

=== 2011 ===
NTFA Div 2	Wins	Byes	Losses	Draws	For	Against	%	Pts	Final	Team	G	B	Pts	Team	G	B	Pts
Old Scotch	16	0	2	0	2257	1027	219.77%	64	Elimination	University/Mowbray	23	21	159	St Patricks	10	12	72
Perth	15	0	3	0	2484	1132	219.43%	60	Qualifying	Perth	18	13	121	Fingal Valley	10	8	68
Fingal Valley	13	0	5	0	1916	1170	163.76%	52	1st Semi	University/Mowbray	17	22	124	Fingal Valley	11	9	75
University/Mowbray	12	0	6	0	2324	1258	184.74%	48	2nd Semi	Old Scotch	21	19	145	Perth	9	7	61
St Patricks	10	0	8	0	1959	1377	142.27%	40	Preliminary	University/Mowbray	16	18	114	Perth	8	3	51
Lilydale	9	0	9	0	2263	1434	157.81%	36	Grand	University/Mowbray	16	12	108	Old Scotch	14	13	97
Evandale	9	0	9	0	1861	1531	121.55%	36									
Tamar Cats	3	0	15	0	1045	2873	36.37%	12									
Old Launcestonians	2	0	16	0	853	2990	28.53%	8									

=== 2012 ===
NTFA Div 2	Wins	Byes	Losses	Draws	For	Against	%	Pts	Final	Team	G	B	Pts	Team	G	B	Pts
Evandale	17	0	1	0	2604	982	265.17%	68	Elimination	Fingal Valley	13	17	95	St Patricks	12	7	79
Lilydale	14	0	4	0	2533	1138	222.58%	56	Qualifying	Old Scotch	14	22	106	Lilydale	15	13	103
Old Scotch	14	0	4	0	2107	1130	186.46%	56	1st Semi	Lilydale	13	7	85	Fingal Valley	9	14	68
Fingal Valley	12	0	6	0	1868	1237	151.01%	48	2nd Semi	Evandale	15	9	99	Old Scotch	12	5	77
St Patricks	9	0	9	0	1841	1601	114.99%	36	Preliminary	Lilydale	13	13	91	Old Scotch	9	10	64
University/Mowbray	9	0	9	0	1866	1624	114.90%	36	Grand	Lilydale	11	4	70	Evandale	8	11	59
Old Launcestonians	7	0	11	0	1380	1926	71.65%	28									
South - Prospect Hawks	5	0	13	0	1213	2285	53.09%	20									
Tamar Cats	3	0	15	0	1127	2422	46.53%	12									

=== 2013 ===
NTFA Div 2	Wins	Byes	Losses	Draws	For	Against	%	Pts	Final	Team	G	B	Pts	Team	G	B	Pts
Fingal Valley	18	0	0	0	2507	1046	239.67%	72	Elimination	St Patricks	10	8	68	University/Mowbray	4	6	30
Evandale	15	0	3	0	1817	1049	173.21%	60	Qualifying	Old Scotch	6	12	48	Evandale	5	7	37
Old Scotch	13	0	5	0	2269	1080	210.09%	52	1st Semi	St Patricks	6	14	50	Evandale	3	5	23
St Patricks	11	0	7	0	2210	1308	168.96%	44	2nd Semi	Old Scotch	18	7	115	Fingal Valley	10	7	67
University/Mowbray	9	0	8	1	1712	1543	110.95%	38	Preliminary	Fingal Valley	14	11	95	St Patricks	11	12	78
South - Prospect Hawks	9	0	9	0	1758	1632	107.72%	36	Grand	Old Scotch	10	10	70	Fingal Valley	8	14	62
Lilydale	7	0	10	1	1597	1667	95.80%	30									
Old Launcestonians	4	0	14	0	1437	1798	79.92%	16									
Tamar Cats	3	0	15	0	1236	2566	48.17%	12									
Perth	0	0	18	0	578	3432	16.84%	0									

=== 2014 ===
NTFA Div 2	Wins	Byes	Losses	Draws	For	Against	%	Pts	Final	Team	G	B	Pts	Team	G	B	Pts
St Patricks	13	0	2	1	2250	699	321.89%	54	Elimination	Old Launcestonians	15	14	104	Tamar Cats	6	14	50
Old Scotch	15	0	0	1	2262	490	461.63%	42	Qualifying	Old Scotch	23	24	162	Prospect Hawks	7	2	44
Prospect Hawks	9	0	7	0	1724	1556	110.80%	36	1st Semi	Prospect Hawks	20	15	135	Old Launcestonians	16	9	105
Old Launcestonians	8	0	7	1	1605	1307	122.80%	34	2nd Semi	Old Scotch	17	16	118	St Patricks	15	4	94
Tamar Cats	8	0	8	0	1494	1656	90.22%	32	Preliminary	St Patricks	15	20	110	Prospect Hawks	4	14	38
Evandale	8	0	8	0	1128	1433	78.72%	32	Grand	Old Scotch	17	9	111	St Patricks	8	6	54
Fingal Valley	13	0	2	1	2076	807	257.25%	28									
University/Mowbray	6	0	10	0	1280	1335	95.88%	24									
Lilydale	3	0	13	0	1156	1682	68.73%	12									
Meander Valley Suns	3	0	13	0	1119	2117	52.86%	12									
Perth	0	0	16	0	444	3456	12.85%	0									

In a match between Old Scotch and Fingal Valley played on 10 May, the match was abandoned prior to half time because of a fight between the players of both teams.

On 23 May the NTFA Board met in relation to that match and advised the following:

1. The match would be declared void with no premiership points awarded for the game, no points for and against counted for the game, and no NTFA Best and Fairest votes awarded for the game.
2. Fingal would be fined $6000 and forfeit 24 premiership points; Old Scotch would be fined $4000 and forfeit 16 premiership points. The previously suspended fines from 2013 for each club would also be imposed.
3. Until the end of the 2015 season, three umpires plus a reserve umpire will be allocated to all future matches between these two clubs with the additional cost be split equally between the two clubs.
4. Until the end of the 2015 season, all matches between these two clubs will be videoed from at least two angles and the additional cost be equally split between the two clubs.

=== 2015 ===
NTFA Div 2	Wins	Byes	Losses	Draws	For	Against	%	Pts	Final	Team	G	B	Pts	Team	G	B	Pts
St Patricks	18	0	0	0	2611	869	300.46%	72	Elimination	Uni-Mowbray	18	18	126	Prospect Hawks	10	7	67
Evandale	14	0	3	1	1850	1047	176.70%	58	Qualifying	Old Scotch	10	13	73	Evandale	4	7	31
Old Scotch	14	0	4	0	2264	1079	209.82%	56	1st Semi	Evandale	15	13	103	Uni-Mowbray	5	11	41
University/Mowbray	11	0	7	0	1768	1395	126.74%	44	2nd Semi	Old Scotch	10	11	71	St Patricks	10	9	69
Prospect Hawks	9	0	9	0	1713	1905	89.92%	36	Preliminary	St Patricks	10	17	77	Evandale	5	5	35
Meander Valley Suns	7	0	10	1	1261	1962	64.27%	30	Grand	Old Scotch	12	9	81	St Patricks	7	8	50
Tamar Cats	6	0	12	0	1594	2103	75.80%	24									
Lilydale	5	0	13	0	1285	1902	67.56%	20									
Perth	3	0	15	0	1420	2363	60.09%	12									
Old Launcestonians	2	0	16	0	1178	2319	50.80%	8									

=== 2016 ===
NTFA Div 2	Wins	Byes	Losses	Draws	For	Against	%	Pts	Final	Team	G	B	Pts	Team	G	B	Pts
Old Scotch	17	0	1	0	2408	895	269.05%	68	Elimination	Evandale	18	10	118	St Patricks	5	8	38
University/Mowbray	15	0	3	0	2201	933	235.91%	60	Qualifying	Lilydale	10	14	74	Uni-Mowbray	5	4	34
Lilydale	14	0	4	0	2320	929	249.73%	56	1st Semi	Uni-Mowbray	16	18	114	Evandale	4	15	39
Evandale	12	0	6	0	1748	1017	171.88%	48	2nd Semi	Lilydale	8	14	62	Old Scotch	9	7	61
St Patricks	11	0	7	0	1647	1330	123.83%	44	Preliminary	Old Scotch	15	15	105	Uni-Mowbray	5	9	39
Prospect Hawks	6	0	12	0	1268	2065	61.40%	24	Grand	Old Scotch	15	4	94	Lilydale	9	12	66
Tamar Cats	5	0	13	0	1272	2134	59.61%	20									
Meander Valley Suns	4	0	14	0	1262	2300	54.87%	16									
Old Launcestonians	3	0	15	0	956	2066	46.27%	12									
Perth	3	0	15	0	1078	2491	43.28%	12									

=== 2017 ===
NTFA Div 2	Wins	Byes	Losses	Draws	For	Against	%	Pts	Final	Team	G	B	Pts	Team	G	B	Pts
Old Scotch	14	0	2	0	1827	827	220.92%	56	Elimination	Lilydale	36	15	231	Perth	9	3	57
Evandale	14	0	2	0	1481	690	214.64%	56	Elimination	East Coast Swans	19	10	124	St Patricks	14	8	92
Lilydale	12	0	4	0	1849	791	233.75%	48	Qualifying	Evandale	14	4	88	Old Scotch	12	11	83
East Coast Swans	12	0	4	0	2009	920	218.37%	48	1st Semi	East Coast Swans	13	10	88	Old Scotch	11	19	85
St Patricks	11	0	5	0	1745	1029	169.58%	44	2nd Semi	Lilydale	7	8	50	Evandale	7	6	48
Perth	8	0	8	0	1661	1569	105.86%	32	Preliminary	East Coast Swans	20	8	128	Evandale	8	13	61
Tamar Cats	6	0	10	0	1130	1625	69.54%	24	Grand	Lilydale	13	8	86	East Coast Swans	7	7	49
Old Launcestonians	6	0	10	0	1015	1708	59.43%	24									
Meander Valley Suns	5	0	11	0	1092	1593	68.55%	20									
Bridport	5	0	11	0	1118	2166	51.62%	20									
University/Mowbray	2	0	14	0	867	1834	47.27%	8									
Prospect Hawks	1	0	15	0	933	1975	47.24%	4									

=== 2018 ===
NTFA Division 1	Wins	Byes	Losses	Draws	For	Against	%	Pts	Final	Team	G	B	Pts	Team	G	B	Pts
St Patricks	15	0	0	1	1835	746	245.98%	62	Elimination	East Coast	16	19	115	Perth	6	9	45
Lilydale	13	0	2	1	1923	677	284.05%	54	Qualifying	Evandale	9	11	65	Lilydale	4	12	36
Evandale	12	0	3	1	1494	691	216.21%	50	1st Semi	East Coast	11	12	78	Lilydale	8	12	60
East Coast Swans	11	0	4	1	1967	970	202.78%	46	2nd Semi	Evandale	13	7	85	St Patricks	10	7	67
Perth	9	0	7	0	1808	1301	138.97%	36	Preliminary	East Coast	16	12	108	St Patricks	7	15	57
Old Launcestonians	8	0	8	0	1383	1136	121.74%	32	Grand	East Coast	7	14	56	Evandale	8	2	50
Old Scotch	7	0	9	0	1230	1197	102.76%	28									
Bridport	4	0	12	0	1297	1468	88.35%	16									
Meander Valley Suns	4	0	12	0	866	1548	55.94%	16									
Tamar Cats	2	0	14	0	916	2517	36.39%	8									
University/Mowbray	1	0	15	0	395	2857	13.83%	4									

=== 2019 ===
NTFA Division 1	Wins	Byes	Losses	Draws	For	Against	%	Pts	Final	Team	G	B	Pts	Team	G	B	Pts
Lilydale	16	0	0	0	1938	641	302.34%	64	Elimination	Evandale	11	13	79	Old Launcestonians	4	16	40
St Patricks	13	0	3	0	1893	942	200.96%	52	Qualifying	East Coast	11	17	83	St Patricks	9	20	74
East Coast Swans	11	0	5	0	1768	1051	168.22%	44	1st Semi	St Patricks	18	15	123	Evandale	7	12	54
Evandale	10	0	6	0	1406	972	144.65%	40	2nd Semi	Lilydale	15	16	106	East Coast	8	5	53
Old Launcestonians	10	0	6	0	1314	935	140.53%	40	Preliminary	St Patricks	10	19	79	East Coast	5	8	38
Bridport	9	0	7	0	1480	1227	120.62%	36	Grand	Lilydale	14	10	94	St Patricks	7	0	42
Meander Valley Suns	5	0	11	0	1259	1269	99.21%	20									
Perth	4	0	12	0	1029	1756	58.60%	16									
Old Scotch	2	0	14	0	648	1853	34.97%	8									
University/Mowbray	0	0	16	0	547	2636	20.75%	0									

=== 2021 ===
2021 NTFA Division 1 standings
Team	Wins	Draws	Losses	For	Against	Percentage	Points
Lilydale	14	1	1	1778	442	402.26%	58
Old Scotch	12	1	3	1573	614	256.19%	50
Old Launcestonians	11	1	4	1145	643	178.07%	46
East Coast Swans	11	1	4	1283	762	18.37%	46
St Patrick's	10	1	5	1212	617	196.43%	42
Bridport	6	1	9	1027	1162	88.38%	26
Meander Valley Suns	5	1	10	723	1275	56.71%	22
Perth	4	1	11	892	1620	55.06%	18
Evandale	2	1	13	560	1300	43.08%	10
University of Tasmania	0	1	15	343	2101	16.33%	2

2021 NTFA Division 1 finals
Game	Team 1	Team 2
Elimination final	East Coast Swans 9.12 (66)	St Patrick's 4.11 (35)
Qualifying final	Old Scotch 7.7 (49)	Old Launcestonians 9.5 (59)
1st semi-final	Old Scotch 7.9 (51)	East Coast Swans 8.13 (61)
2nd semi-final	Lilydale 16.9 (105)	Old Launcestonians 4.12 (36)
Preliminary final	Old Launcestonians 15.8 (98)	East Coast Swans 10.15 (75)
Grand final	Lilydale 12.11 (83)	Old Launcestonians 9.12 (66)

== Women's ==
=== 2019 ===
2019 NTFA Women's standings
Team	Wins	Draws	Losses	For	Against	Percentage	Points
South Launceston	10	0	0	539	78	691.03%	40
Scottsdale	8	0	2	446	68	655.88%	32
Evandale	7	0	3	461	137	336.50%	28
Bridgenorth	4	0	6	243	338	71.89%	24
Meander Valley Suns	4	0	6	299	428	69.86%	24
Old Launcestonians	4	0	6	197	360	54.72%	24
Old Scotch	3	0	7	151	459	32.90%	12
George Town	0	0	10	72	540	13.33%	0

2019 NTFA Women's finals
Game	Team 1	Team 2
1st semi-final	Evandale 7.4 (46)	Bridgenorth 3.6 (24)
2nd semi-final	South Launceston 0.0 (0)	Scottsdale 2.9 (21)
Preliminary final	South Launceston 5.3 (33)	Evandale 4.1 (25)
Grand final	Scottsdale 3.4 (22)	South Launceston 5.3 (33)

=== 2020 ===
2020 NTFA Women's standings
Team	Wins	Draws	Losses	For	Against	Percentage	Points
Old Launcestonians	7	0	2	254	101	251.49%	28
Scottsdale	6	0	3	233	132	176.52%	24
Bridgenorth	5	0	4	280	209	133.97%	20
Meander Valley Suns	0	0	9	131	456	28.73%	0

2020 NTFA Women's finals
Game	Team 1	Team 2
Semi-final	Old Launcestonians 3.9 (27)	Meander Valley Suns 4.2 (26)
Semi-final	Scottsdale 4.4 (28)	Bridgenorth 1.2 (8)
Grand final	Old Launcestonians 2.2 (14)	Scottsdale 3.5 (23)

=== 2021 ===
2021 NTFA Women's standings
Team	Wins	Draws	Losses	For	Against	Percentage	Points
Launceston	10	1	0	743	81	917.28%	42
Old Scotch	9	1	1	655	136	481.62%	38
Scottsdale	8	0	3	453	140	323.57%	32
Bridgenorth	8	0	3	489	232	210.78%	32
Old Launcestonians	6	1	4	452	188	240.43%	26
Hillwood	6	1	4	366	300	122.00%	26
South Launceston	6	0	5	527	276	190.94%	24
George Town	4	2	5	244	290	84.14%	20
Evandale	2	0	9	215	477	45.07%	8
Meander Valley Suns	2	0	9	218	519	42.00%	8
Deloraine	2	0	9	147	570	25.79%	8
Longford	0	0	11	40	1340	2.99%	0

2021 NTFA Women's finals
Game	Team 1	Team 2
Elimination final	Bridgenorth 0.4 (4)	Old Launcestonians 3.9 (27)
Qualifying final	Old Scotch 4.9 (33)	Scottsdale 2.3 (15)
1st semi-final	Scottsdale 0.2 (2)	Old Launcestonians 2.2 (14)
2nd semi-final	Launceston 3.4 (22)	Old Scotch 2.4 (16)
Preliminary final	Old Scotch 3.4 (22)	Old Launcestonians 4.2 (26)
Grand final	Launceston 4.5 (29)	Old Launcestonians 0.5 (5)
