= North Western Football Association =

- Current season, competition or edition: 2025
- Sport: Australian rules football
- Founded: 1894; 132 years ago
- Website: nwfa.net.au

The North Western Football Association is an Australian rules football competition based on the North West Coast of Tasmania, Australia.

== Origins ==
The North Western Football Association was formed at a meeting at the Formby Hotel in 1894 and is the oldest continuously running football competition in the state of Tasmania. The first clubs were Devonport, Latrobe, Mersey and Ulverstone.

The NWFA was the senior football body on the coast until a break away group of teams formed the NWFU in 1910.
The NWFA was then looked upon as a junior competition feeding the NWFU and later the TFL Statewide League until their demise and later the NTFL teams.

The competition has seen more than fifty teams participate in its history from all parts of the North West Coast indicating the rise and fall and changing fortunes of many towns throughout history. Clubs such as Burnie Tigers, Cooee, Penguin, Mole Creek, Wilmot, Barrington, Don, East Devonport, Moriarty, Sassafras, Melrose and Gowrie Park are among many to have played in the NWFA.

From mid-1938 until it went into recess during World War II, the NWFA played under VFA rules, a code of rules established by the Victorian Football Association as a rival to the national rules. This most notably meant that throwing the ball was legal during those years. The NWFA was one of the highest level competitions outside the VFA to play under those rules. Upon its resumption after World War II, the NWFA returned to playing under the traditional rules.
The Association currently operates as an eight club competition and the medal awarded to the Association's Best & Fairest player is the Les Hicks Medal.

== Clubs ==
=== Locations ===
Club locations - Devonport, Ulverstone and surrounds	Club locations - Rosebery-Toorak

=== Current ===
Club	Colours	Nickname	Home Ground	Former League	Est.	Years in NWFA	NWFA Premierships	
Club	Colours	Nickname	Home Ground	Former League	Est.	Years in NWFA	Total	Years
East Ulverstone		Crows	Haywoods Reserve, Ulverstone	–	2000	2000-	2	2002, 2025
Forth		Magpies	Forth Recreation Ground, Forth	NWFU, LFA	1904	1905, 1907-1923, 1927, 1929, 1931-1932, 1934-1940, 1946-1953, ?-present day	21	1922, 1935, 1937, 1938, 1939, 1940, 1948, 1950, 1956, 1957, 1958, 1965, 1972, 1974, 1980, 2005, 2007, 2015, 2016, 2018, 2022
Motton Preston		Demons	Preston Recreation Ground, Preston	LFA	1967	1976-	10	1985, 1986, 2004, 2006, 2010, 2012, 2013, 2020, 2021, 2023
Rosebery-Toorak		Hawks	Rosebery Park Oval, Rosebery	WTFA	1987	1990-	2	1998, 1999
Sheffield		Robins	Sheffield Football Ground, Sheffield	KFA	c.1910	1939, 1956-	8	1964, 1973, 1987, 1988, 1994, 2000, 2003, 2024
Spreyton		Eagles	Maidstone Park, Spreyton	–	1921	1921-1925, 1945-	9	1954, 1975, 1976, 1977, 1978, 1984, 1990, 2001, 2011
Turners Beach		Seagulls	Turners Beach Football Ground, Turners Beach	LFA	1971	1976-	5	1981, 1982, 1983, 1994, 2014
Wesley Vale		Roos	Pipers Park, Wesley Vale	NWFU	1903	1903-1906, 1908-1940, 1946-1949, 1951-	21	1910, 1921, 1925, 1926, 1929, 1930, 1931, 1934, 1936, 1949, 1959, 1960, 1963, 1979, 1989, 1996, 1997, 2008, 2009, 2017, 2019

=== Former ===
Club	Colours	Nickname	Home Ground	Former League	Est.	Years in NWFA	NWFA Premierships		Fate
Club	Colours	Nickname	Home Ground	Former League	Est.	Years in NWFA	Total	Years	Fate
Aberdeen				–	1936	1936-1937	0	-	Folded after 1937 season
Albion						1903	0	-	Folded after 1903 season
Barrington			Barrington Football Ground, Barrington	KFA	1895	1895-1897, 1901, 1956-1962	2	1895, 1896	Formed Roland FA in 1904. Merged with Sheffield in 1963
Barrington Rovers			Barrington Football Ground, Barrington	–	1909	1909	0	-	Moved to Wilmot FA after 1909 season
Burnie (Emu Bay 1901)			West Park, Burnie		1885	1901, 1907	0	-	Moved to East Wellington FA in 1902 and 1908
Devonport		Blues	Devonport Oval, Devonport	–	1881	1894-1908	2	1894, 1898	Formed NWFU in 1910
Devonport Cadets						1921-1923	0	-	Folded after 1923 season
Devonport Cobbers						1945	0	-	Moved to Devonport JFA in 1946
Devonport Juniors						1906-1909, 1926-1928, 1930-1933	1	1933	Left league
Don		Tigers	Don Football Ground, Don		1910	1902-1903, 1906, 1909, 1924-1925, 1927-1928, 1931-1936, 1939	0	-	Folded after 1939 season
East Devonport	(1931-32) (1933-40)				1901	1931-1936, 1938-1940	0	-	Moved to NWFU in 1945
Elizabeth-Railton		Eagles	Railton Recreation Reserve, Railton	EDFA	1925	1986-1989	0	-	Folded after 1989 season
Eugenana				DJFA		1950-1951	0	-	Folded after 1951 season
Ex Servicemen				–	1950	1950-?	3	1951, 1952, 1953	Folded
Federal						1903-1904	0	-	Folded
Gowrie Park		Saints	Gowrie Park Football Ground, Gowrie Park	–	1965	1965-1970	4	1967, 1968, 1969, 1970	Folded after 1970 season due to the completion of the Mersey-Forth Hydro project
Harford				–	1905	1905	0	-	Moved to East Devon JFA in 1906.
High School						1921-1931, 1936-1937	0	-	Folded before end of 1937 season
Kindred			Kindred Football Ground, Kindred	LFA	1910	1920-1921	0	-	Folded after 1921 season, re-formed in West Devon JFA in 1924
Latrobe		Diehards	Latrobe Football Ground, Latrobe	–	1881	1894-1897, 1903-1908	1	1907	Formed NWFU in 1910
Latrobe Rovers			Latrobe Football Ground, Latrobe	–	1939	1939-1949	1	1945	Became seconds team of Latrobe in 1950
Latrobe YCW			Latrobe Football Ground, Latrobe	–	1938	1938	0	-	Folded after 1938 season
Melrose	Dark with light stripes		Melrose Football Ground, Melrose	–	1920	1907, 1920-1923, 1925-1926, 1929-1932	1	1920	Folded after 1932 season
Mersey			Devonport Oval, Devonport	–	1894	1894-1909, 1920-1940, 1948-1949	13	1898, 1899, 1901, 1902, 1904, 1905, 1908, 1909, 1923, 1924, 1927, 1928, 1932	Formed NWFU in 1910, returned in 1919, recess in 1940, re-formed in 1948 and folded after 1949 season.
Mole Creek		Bulldogs	Mole Creek Recreation Ground, Mole Creek	EDFA	1920	1998-2003	0	-	Moved to Leven FA after 2003 season
Moriarty	(1905)(1945-50)	Spudpickers	Henry Dawson's Paddock, Moriarty	EDJFA	1904	1905, 1922-1923, 1945-1950	0	-	Moved to East Devon JFA in 1906. Moved to Latrobe FL in 1951
North Devonport						1904	0	-	Folded
Old Devonians				–	1935	1935-1939	0	-	Folded after 1939 season
Penguin		Two Blues	Penguin Recreation Ground, Penguin	–	1890	1907	0	-	Formed NWFU in 1910
Railton		Tigers	Railton Recreation Reserve, Railton	LFL	1891	1939-1940, 1946-1982	6	1933, 1946, 1947, 1955, 1961, 1966	Folded after 1982 season. Re-formed in Leven FA in 1990
Sassafras	(1905)(1946-50)		Sassafras Reserve, Sassafras	LFL	1905	1905, 1946, 1948-1950	0	-	Moved to East Devon JFA in 1906. Moved to Latrobe FL in 1951
Spreyton Shamrocks		Shamrocks	Medcraft's Paddock, Lower Barrington	–	1906	1906	0	-	Folded after 1906 season
Sprent		Tigers	Sprent Recreation Ground, Sprent	DFA	1908	1997-2000	0	-	Merged with Ulverstone Districts to form East Ulverstone in 2000
Ulverstone		Robins	Ulverstone Football Ground, Ulverstone	–	1888	1894, 1900-1904, 1906-1908	3	1900, 1903, 1906	Formed NWFU in 1910
Ulverstone District		Rebels	Haywoods Reserve, Ulverstone	LFA	1952	1971-1999	4	1971, 1991, 1992, 1993	Merged with Sprent to form East Ulverstone in 2000
West Ulverstone		Lions	West Ulverstone Football Ground, West Ulverstone	DFA	1973	2002-2023	0	-	Entered recess following 2023 season
Wilmot		Robins	Wilmot Football Ground, Wilmot	KFA	1896	1956-1974	0	-	Moved to Leven FA in 1975

== Premiers ==
List of NWFA Seniors Premiership teams.

- 1894 Devonport
- 1895 Barrington
- 1896 Barrington
- 1897 Devonport
- 1898 Mersey
- 1899 Mersey
- 1900 Ulverstone
- 1901 Mersey
- 1902 Mersey
- 1903 Ulverstone
- 1904 Mersey
- 1905 Mersey
- 1906 Ulverstone
- 1907 Latrobe
- 1908 Mersey
- 1909 Mersey
- 1910 Wesley Vale
- 1911 no details
- 1912 Don
- 1913 no details
- 1914 no details
- 1915 Competition in Recess Due to WWI
- 1916 Competition in Recess Due to WWI
- 1917 Competition in Recess Due to WWI
- 1918 Competition in Recess Due to WWI
- 1919 Competition suspended due to Influenza Epidemic
- 1920 Melrose
- 1921 Wesley Vale
- 1922 Forth
- 1923 Mersey
- 1924 Mersey
- 1925 Wesley Vale
- 1926 Wesley Vale
- 1927 Mersey
- 1928 Mersey
- 1929 Wesley Vale
- 1930 Wesley Vale
- 1931 Wesley Vale
- 1932 Mersey
- 1933 Devonport Juniors
- 1934 Wesley Vale
- 1935 Forth
- 1936 Wesley Vale
- 1937 Forth
- 1938 Forth
- 1939 Forth
- 1940 Forth
- 1941 Competition in Recess Due to WWII
- 1942 Competition in Recess Due to WWII
- 1943 Competition in Recess Due to WWII
- 1944 Competition in Recess Due to WWII
- 1945 Latrobe Rovers
- 1946 Railton
- 1947 Railton
- 1948 Forth
- 1949 Wesley Vale
- 1950 Forth
- 1951 Ex Servicemen
- 1952 Ex Servicemen
- 1953 Ex Servicemen
- 1954 Spreyton
- 1955 Railton
- 1956 Forth
- 1957 Forth
- 1958 Forth
- 1959 Wesley Vale
- 1960 Wesley Vale
- 1961 Railton
- 1962 Sheffield
- 1963 Wesley Vale
- 1964 Sheffield
- 1965 Forth
- 1966 Railton
- 1967 Gowrie Park
- 1968 Gowrie Park
- 1969 Gowrie Park
- 1970 Gowrie Park
- 1971 Ulverstone District
- 1972 Forth
- 1973 Sheffield
- 1974 Forth
- 1975 Spreyton
- 1976 Spreyton
- 1977 Spreyton
- 1978 Spreyton
- 1979 Wesley Vale
- 1980 Forth
- 1981 Turners Beach
- 1982 Turners Beach
- 1983 Turners Beach
- 1984 Spreyton
- 1985 Motton Preston
- 1986 Motton Preston
- 1987 Sheffield
- 1988 Sheffield
- 1989 Wesley Vale
- 1990 Spreyton
- 1991 Ulverstone District
- 1992 Ulverstone District
- 1993 Ulverstone District
- 1994 Sheffield
- 1995 Turners Beach
- 1996 Wesley Vale
- 1997 Wesley Vale
- 1998 Rosebery Toorak
- 1999 Rosebery Toorak
- 2000 Sheffield
- 2001 Spreyton
- 2002 East Ulverstone
- 2003 Sheffield
- 2004 Motton Preston
- 2005 Forth
- 2006 Motton Preston
- 2007 Forth
- 2008 Wesley Vale
- 2009 Wesley Vale
- 2010 Motton Preston
- 2011 Spreyton
- 2012 Motton Preston
- 2013 Motton Preston
- 2014 Turners Beach
- 2015 Forth
- 2016 Forth
- 2017 Wesley Vale
- 2018 Forth
- 2019 Wesley Vale
- 2020 Motton Preston
- 2021 Motton Preston
- 2022 Forth
- 2023 Motton Preston
- 2024 Sheffield
- 2025 East Ulverstone

== Records ==
=== NWFA Record Score ===
- Sheffield Seniors – 69.29 (443) vs Rosebery Toorak 0.0 in 2021. Rosebery-Toorak set an unfortunate new NWFA benchmark with an all-time low percentage in the 2021 season of 1.635% (68 points scored, 4160 points conceded in 15 games). 60% of their points were scored in one match against West Ulverstone, when they only lost by five goals. For the other 14 games, they kicked 1.0.6 four times, 0.1.1 three times, and went scoreless seven times. Their leading goalkicker was Nick McElwee with two goals, both against West Ulverstone. It was the only time he played for the club all year.
- Forth Reserves – 66.24 (420) vs Spreyton 0.0 in 2013.

=== NWFA Individual Goalkicking Record (Match) ===
- Ben Holland – (36) – Wesley Vale v Rosebery Toorak in 2024.
- Note: This is a current Tasmanian state record.

=== Leading Goal Kickers ===
Year	Player	H&A goals	Finals goals	Total Goals
1975	Ron Mansfield (Spreyton)	0	0	0
1976	Royce Miles (Spreyton)	0	0	0
1977	Royce Miles (Spreyton)	76	0	76
1978	G Smith	66	0	66
1979	B Johnson	65	0	65
1980	Lloyd Dixon (Turners Beach)	110	0	110
1981	Brian Cole (Spreyton)	0	0	0
1982	Brian Hickey (Turners Beach)	122	0	122
1983	Brian Eade (Ulverstone District)	86	0	86
1984	Chris Reynolds (Spreyton)	72	0	72
1985	Brian Eade (Ulverstone District)	102	0	102
1986	David Frenshaw (Sheffield)	88	0	88
1987	Mike Brocksopp (Turners Beach)	102	0	102
1988	Shane Harris (Ulverstone District)	77	0	77
1989	Les Davidson (Spreyton)	49	0	49
1990	Michael Bramich (Spreyton)	58	0	58
1991	Les Davidson (Spreyton)	55	0	55
1992	Robert Cole (Forth)	60	0	60
1993	Robert Cole (Forth)	83	10	93
1994	Tom Honner (Rosebery Toorak)	66	3	69
1995	Iaon Drake (Rosebery Toorak)	80	0	80
1996	Iaon Drake (Rosebery Toorak)	110	11	121
1997	Paul Hampton (Sheffield)	100	0	100
1998	Paul Hampton (Sheffield)	81	3	84
1999	Jason Fellows (Rosebery Toorak)	75	15	90
2000	Craig Muir (Wesley Vale)	111	0	111
2001	Andrew Stretton (Sheffield)	57	0	57
2002	Jason Foley (East Ulverstone)	81	0	81
2003	Andrew Stretton (Sheffield)	0	0	0
2004	Jamie Auton (East Ulverstone)	0	0	0
2005	Jamie Auton (East Ulverstone)	96	2	98
2006	Jamie Auton (East Ulverstone)	127	4	131
2007	Paul Hampton (Spreyton)	101	0	101
2008	Todd Bryan (Spreyton)	120	0	120
2009	Jamie Auton (West Ulverstone)	79	0	79
2010	Jamie Auton (West Ulverstone)	101	0	101
2011	Mathew Smedley (Motton Preston)	70	0	70
2012	Shannon Mulvey (Sheffield)	104	0	104
2013	Claye Sculthorpe (Motton Preston)	137	0	137
2014	Nick Milbourne (Forth)	138	8	146
2015	Nick Milbourne (Forth)	108	0	108
2016	Brodie Dennis (Rosebery Toorak))	113	0	113
2017	Nick Veal (Forth)	79	2	81
2018	Tristan Weeks (Wesley Vale)	112	8	120

== Ladders ==
=== 2009 ===
North West FA	Wins	Byes	Losses	Draws	For	Against	%	Pts	Final	Team	G	B	Pts	Team	G	B	Pts
Motton Preston	15	0	1	0	2617	865	302.54%	60	Elimination	Spreyton	26	18	174	West Ulverstone	6	9	45
Wesley Vale	14	0	2	0	2810	1081	259.94%	56	Qualifying	Wesley Vale	10	12	72	Turners Beach	8	12	60
Turners Beach	12	0	4	0	2450	1120	218.75%	48	1st Semi	Spreyton	25	7	157	Turners Beach	20	9	129
Spreyton	11	0	5	0	2516	1275	197.33%	44	2nd Semi	Motton Preston	17	18	120	Wesley Vale	10	6	66
West Ulverstone	7	0	9	0	1580	2266	69.73%	28	Preliminary	Wesley Vale	17	16	118	Spreyton	10	14	74
East Ulverstone	6	0	10	0	1282	2007	63.88%	24	Grand	Wesley Vale	16	11	107	Motton Preston	12	10	82
Sheffield	4	0	12	0	1292	1972	65.52%	16									
Rosebery/Toorak	2	0	14	0	698	2958	23.60%	8									
Forth	1	0	15	0	972	2673	36.36%	4									

=== 2010 ===
North West FA	Wins	Byes	Losses	Draws	For	Against	%	Pts	Final	Team	G	B	Pts	Team	G	B	Pts
Motton Preston	16	2	0	0	2126	711	299.02%	64	Elimination	Forth	14	16	100	East Ulverstone	14	15	99
Turners Beach	11	2	5	0	2009	1186	169.39%	44	Qualifying	Turners Beach	9	13	67	Spreyton	19	12	126
Spreyton	11	2	5	0	1800	1194	150.75%	44	1st Semi	Turners Beach	19	11	125	Forth	13	11	89
Forth	8	2	8	0	1784	1402	127.25%	32	2nd Semi	Motton Preston	20	8	128	Spreyton	11	11	77
East Ulverstone	8	2	8	0	1519	1290	117.75%	32	Preliminary	Turners Beach	9	15	69	Spreyton	5	8	38
West Ulverstone	8	2	8	0	1832	1585	115.58%	32	Grand	Motton Preston	17	12	114	Turners Beach	10	11	71
Sheffield	5	2	11	0	1358	1571	86.44%	20									
Rosebery/Toorak	5	2	11	0	1383	1780	77.70%	20									
Wesley Vale	0	2	16	0	345	3529	9.78%	0									

=== 2011 ===
North West FA	Wins	Byes	Losses	Draws	For	Against	%	Pts	Final	Team	G	B	Pts	Team	G	B	Pts
Motton Preston	16	0	0	0	2579	734	351.36%	64	Elimination	Forth	18	10	118	East Ulverstone	15	13	103
Spreyton	13	0	3	0	2196	1130	194.34%	52	Qualifying	Spreyton	23	18	156	Turners Beach	9	7	61
Turners Beach	10	0	6	0	2000	1252	159.74%	40	1st Semi	Turners Beach	12	14	86	Forth	7	4	46
Forth	8	0	8	0	1731	1674	103.41%	32	2nd Semi	Motton Preston	27	15	177	Spreyton	10	10	70
East Ulverstone	8	0	8	0	1440	1563	92.13%	32	Preliminary	Spreyton	17	15	117	Turners Beach	14	9	93
Rosebery/Toorak	6	0	9	1	1238	1987	62.30%	26	Grand	Spreyton	11	18	84	Motton Preston	9	7	61
Wesley Vale	6	0	10	0	1538	2109	72.93%	24									
Sheffield	4	0	11	1	1383	1675	82.57%	18									
West Ulverstone	0	0	16	0	1071	3051	35.10%	0									

=== 2012 ===
North West FA	Wins	Byes	Losses	Draws	For	Against	%	Pts	Final	Team	G	B	Pts	Team	G	B	Pts
Motton Preston	15	0	1	0	2390	1005	237.81%	60	Elimination	Forth	17	10	112	Spreyton	15	10	100
Sheffield	12	0	4	0	2344	1059	221.34%	48	Qualifying	East Ulverstone	21	11	137	Sheffield	18	21	129
East Ulverstone	12	0	4	0	2020	1144	176.57%	48	1st Semi	Sheffield	20	10	130	Forth	4	15	39
Spreyton	10	0	6	0	2115	1269	166.67%	40	2nd Semi	Motton Preston	17	16	118	East Ulverstone	8	7	55
Forth	7	0	9	0	1752	1400	125.14%	28	Preliminary	Sheffield	17	15	117	East Ulverstone	15	9	99
Wesley Vale	7	0	9	0	1698	1426	119.07%	28	Grand	Motton Preston	9	11	65	Sheffield	5	4	34
Rosebery/Toorak	7	0	9	0	1626	1370	118.69%	28									
West Ulverstone	2	0	14	0	1141	2545	44.83%	8									
Turners Beach	0	0	16	0	314	4182	7.51%	0									

=== 2013 ===
North West FA	Wins	Byes	Losses	Draws	For	Against	%	Pts	Final	Team	G	B	Pts	Team	G	B	Pts
Motton Preston	15	0	1	0	2496	774	322.48%	60	Elimination	Rosebery Toorak	7	10	52	Forth	5	15	45
Sheffield	12	0	4	0	2667	1143	233.33%	48	Qualifying	Sheffield	23	20	158	Wesley Vale	7	12	54
Wesley Vale	11	0	5	0	2299	1082	212.48%	44	1st Semi	Rosebery Toorak	16	16	112	Wesley Vale	13	6	84
Forth	11	0	5	0	2251	1317	170.92%	44	2nd Semi	Motton Preston	18	23	131	Sheffield	9	4	58
Rosebery/Toorak	9	0	7	0	1605	1266	126.78%	36	Preliminary	Sheffield	16	13	109	Rosebery Toorak	12	18	90
East Ulverstone	7	0	9	0	1306	1657	78.82%	28	Grand	Motton Preston	14	16	100	Sheffield	5	7	37
Turners Beach	5	0	11	0	1525	1926	79.18%	20									
West Ulverstone	2	0	14	0	937	2679	34.98%	8									
Spreyton	0	0	16	0	667	3909	17.06%	0									

=== 2014 ===
North West FA	Wins	Byes	Losses	Draws	For	Against	%	Pts	Final	Team	G	B	Pts	Team	G	B	Pts
Turners Beach	14	0	2	0	2463	856	287.73%	56	Elimination	Forth	24	16	160	Rosebery Toorak	14	15	99
Sheffield	14	0	2	0	3039	1106	274.77%	56	Qualifying	Motton Preston	16	10	106	Sheffield	14	16	100
Motton Preston	14	0	2	0	2354	1062	221.66%	56	1st Semi	Sheffield	18	18	126	Forth	8	9	57
Forth	9	0	7	0	2271	1108	204.96%	36	2nd Semi	Turners Beach	15	15	105	Motton Preston	15	10	100
Rosebery/Toorak	8	0	8	0	1587	1628	97.48%	32	Preliminary	Motton Preston	17	14	116	Sheffield	13	5	83
Wesley Vale	7	0	9	0	1644	1805	91.08%	28	Grand	Turners Beach	12	14	86	Motton Preston	8	10	58
East Ulverstone	4	0	12	0	963	2283	42.18%	16									
West Ulverstone	2	0	14	0	1053	3023	34.83%	8									
Spreyton	0	0	16	0	746	3249	22.96%	0									
