= Turners Beach =

- Town
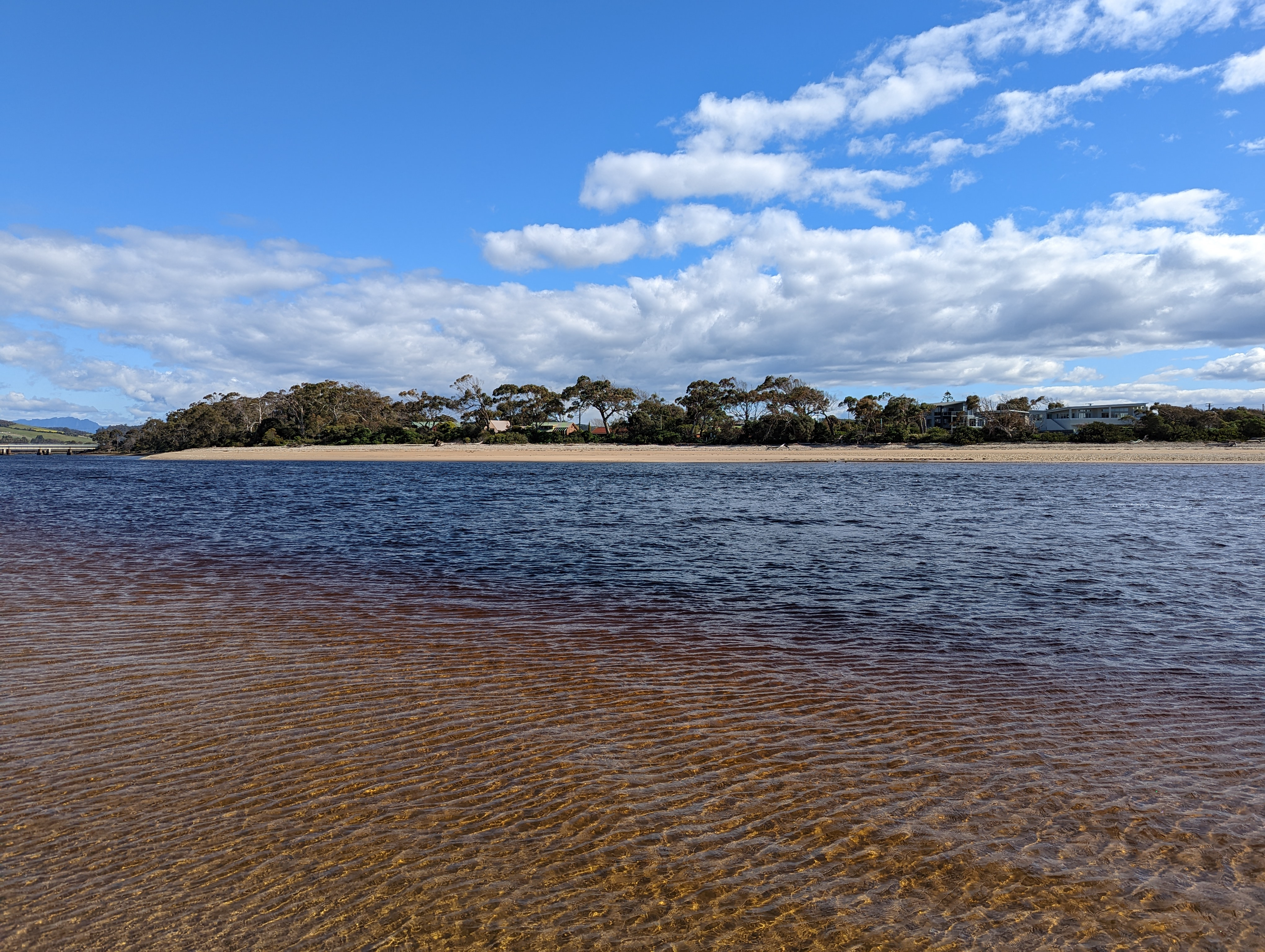
- Turners Beach (Photo taken from the Leith side of the River Forth)

- Coordinates: 41°9′41″S 146°14′4″E
- Country: Australia
- State: Tasmania
- LGA: Central Coast Council

Government
  - State electorate: Braddon
  - Federal division: Braddon

Population
  - Total: 1,966 (SAL 2021)
- Postcode: 7315

Turners Beach is a small town on the north coast of Tasmania. Almost equidistant between the cities of Devonport and Ulverstone, it is at the western mouth into Bass Strait of the Forth River, opposite the village of Leith on its eastern mouth. Its population as at 2021 was 1,966 people.

== History ==
A cairn recording the location of the first European settlement of the area in 1840 by James Fenton (1820–1901) is situated 100 metres from Forth Bridge in Turners Beach and was also the site of the pioneer and historian's house.

The Gables an early residential house was built around 1850 and was originally known as The Sailors Return Inn. Although the building only operated as a hotel for a decade (it was delicensed in 1860) it had a short and colourful history. In 1853 it was robbed by the bushrangers Dalton and Kelly (not Ned) who stole the landlord's whale boat and sailed across the Bass Strait to Victoria. They were subsequently caught, brought back to Tasmania and executed in Launceston.

Its post office opened on 15 December 1956.

Turners Beach was originally known as Scott’s Beach, named after the Scott family who operated a flour mill on Claytons Rivulet. .

The township of Turners Beach was developed by and renamed in honour of Harry Vincent Glengyle (Glen) Turner on 21 March 1961 who was on the Ulverstone Council and Town Planning Committee at the time.

== Business ==
There used to be two small supermarkets in the town one each end of the Esplanade. The one at the top of the Esplanade closed and the other is now a café providore.

A service station and takeaway exists on Forth Road.

There used to be two caravan parks to cater for the summer holiday makers. One has since closed and was redeveloped for residential buildings.

For many decades there was a garden nursery operating in Forth Road.

A Twilight Market featuring local producers and artisans with a community focus is held the last Sunday of every month.

== The Beach ==
The tide goes out a fair distance and at times there was an annual beach sprint on the hard sand. The rolling waves produce a very fine white sand which is less course than that of Ulverstone.

The mouth of the Forth River is at one end of the beach and has been treacherous to surfers. The Forth River used to be plentiful with Cocky Salmon and mullet. At the other end of the beach is Claytons Rivulet known to contain platypus, eels and brown trout.

== Sports ==
=== Football ===
The Turners Beach Football Club compete in the North Western Football Association.

=== Cricket ===
The Turners Beach Cricket Club compete in the Mersey Valley Cricket Association.

=== Bowls ===
Turners Beach Bowls Club have Men's and Women's Pennants as well as social bowls.

=== Tennis ===
Turners Beach Tennis Club is affiliated with Tennis North West.

== Community Groups ==
=== Cubs and Scouts ===
The 1st Turners Beach Scouts part of the Leven District Scouting Association operate out of the local hall on the Esplanade.

=== Volunteer Fire Brigade ===
Until 2016, there was a Turner Beach Volunteer Fire Brigade, with a base in Turners Avenue that had a siren that could be heard all over town. This brigade has since been amalgamated with the Forth Valley Brigade.
