= Deloraine Football Association =

Australian rules football league

Deloraine Football League
- Most recent season or competition: 1983
- Sport: Australian rules football
- Founded: 1926
- First season: 1926
- Folded: 1983
- No. of teams: 5 (1983), 12 (historical)
- Country: Australia
- Last champion: Elizabeth Town (1983)
- Most titles: Mole Creek (14)
- Related competitions: Esk FA; Esk-Deloraine FA

The Deloraine Football Association was an Australian rules football competition based in the Meander Valley region of Tasmania, featuring clubs from small communities around the town of Deloraine.

== History ==
The competition began as the Chudleigh Football Association in 1926, with Caveside, Chudleigh and Mole Creek competing in the initial season. The early seasons of the competition featured a rotating cast of clubs, with Meander joining in 1927, Caveside folding during that season, and Red Hills, Dairy Plains and Weegena also having stints in the league. The CFA appears not to have run during the 1933 season, but it returned the following year. Kimberley joined in 1938 and won two premierships in its first two seasons in the CFA. The CFA entered recess following the 1939 season as WWII enlistments prevented clubs from being able to field a team.

The Chudleigh FA was revived in the form of the Central Junior Football Association in 1946. While this was initially the junior grade competition of the Central FA, the disbandment of that league following the 1945 season saw the junior competition continue with a mixture of junior sides and senior clubs. 8 teams competed in 1946, however Hagley and Westbury Juniors both left the league a year later which cut the number of clubs to 6. Kimberley folded after the 1949 season and were replaced by a re-formed Red Hills in 1950. This year also saw the competition adopt the Deloraine Football Association name for the first time.

Following the departure of Deloraine Juniors for the NTDFL in 1954, the competition remained stable with 5 clubs for the next 2 decades. Hagley, which had played in the Esk Football Association until entering recess in 1966, re-formed and joined the DFA in 1970. Meander briefly played in the Esk FA during the 1970s, but returned to the DFA in 1976. Despite winning back-to-back premierships in 1978 and 1979 the club would find itself with a lack of players prior to the 1982 season, forcing it to fold. Other DFA clubs were also experiencing player shortages, which prompted both it and the Esk FA to bring about a merger of the two competitions. The resulting Esk-Deloraine FA began competition in 1984.

== Clubs ==
=== Final ===
Club	Colours	Nickname	Home Ground	Former League	Est.	Years in DFA	DFA Senior Premierships		Fate
Club	Colours	Nickname	Home Ground	Former League	Est.	Years in DFA	Total	Years	Fate
Chudleigh	(1935) (1939) (1950s) (1960s) (1970s–83)	Redlegs	Chudleigh Showgrounds, Chudleigh	ETFA	1919	1926–1935, 1939, 1946–1983	6	1926, 1927, 1959, 1962, 1964, 1973	Absorbed by Mole Creek after 1983 season
Elizabeth Town		Eagles	Railton Recreation Reserve, Railton	CFA	1925	1946–1983	4	1952, 1961, 1976, 1983	Formed Esk-Deloraine FA in 1983
Hagley		Magpies	Hagley Recreation Ground, Hagley	EFA	1901	1970–1983	3	1972, 1974, 1975	Formed Esk-Deloraine FA in 1983
Mole Creek		Bulldogs	Mole Creek Recreation Ground, Mole Creek	–	1920	1926–1932, 1934–1939, 1946–1983	14	1934, 1949, 1950, 1951, 1955, 1958, 1960, 1963, 1968, 1969, 1970, 1971, 1977, 1980	Formed Esk-Deloraine FA in 1983
Red Hills		Wrens, Blues, Hills	Red Hills Recreation Ground, Red Hills	MFA	1907	1928–1929, 1950–1983	8	1954, 1956, 1957, 1965, 1966, 1967, 1981, 1982	Recess between 1930 and 1949. Formed Esk-Deloraine FA in 1983

=== Former ===
Club	Colours	Nickname	Home Ground	Former League	Est.	Years in DFA	DFA Senior Premierships		Fate
Club	Colours	Nickname	Home Ground	Former League	Est.	Years in DFA	Total	Years	Fate
Caveside				–	1926	1926–1927	0	-	Folded during 1927 season
Dairy Plains				CFA	1931	1931–1932, 1934–1939	2	1935, 1936	Played in Central FA in 1933. Did not re-form after WWII
Deloraine Juniors		Magpies	Deloraine Recreation Ground, Deloraine	–	1894	1946–1953	0	-	Joined seniors in Northern Tasmania District FL in 1954
Hagley Juniors		Robins	Hagley Recreation Ground, Hagley	–	1901	1946	0	-	Departed after 1946 season
Kimberley		Robins	Kimberley Recreation Ground, Kimberley	CFA	1902	1938–1939, 1946–1949	2	1938, 1939	Folded after 1949 season
Meander		Robins	Meander Recreation Ground, Meander	EFA	1924	1927–1932, 1934–1939, 1946–?, 1976–1981	8	1932, 1946, 1947, 1948, 1953, 1954, 1978, 1979	Played in Esk FA between unknown date and 1975. Folded after 1981 season.
Sunnyside				CFA	1905	1939	0	-	Moved to Wilmot FA in 1940
Weegena			Weegena Recreation Ground, Weegena	CFA	1902	1930–1931	0	-	Returned to Central FA in 1932.
Westbury Juniors		Tigers	Westbury Recreation Ground, Westbury	–	1902	1946	0	-	Departed after 1946 season

== Premierships ==
Year	Premiers	Score	Runners-up	Notes
1926				
1927	Chudleigh			
1928	Meander			
1929				
1930				
1931				
1932	Meander	6.14 (50) - 5.10 (40)	Mole Creek	
1933	In recess			
1934	Mole Creek	7.6 (48) - 5.5 (35)	Dairy Plains	
1935	Dairy Plains			
1936	Dairy Plains	7.10 (52) - 6.11 (47)	Meander	
1937				
1938	Kimberley			
1939	Kimberley	9.15 (69) - 8.7 (55)	Chudleigh	
1940–1945 Competition in recess due to WWII
1946	Meander	7.15 (57) - 7.12 (54)	Mole Creek	
1947	Meander			
1948	Meander			
1949	Mole Creek			
1950	Mole Creek	11.2 (68) - 5.7 (37)	Chudleigh	
1951	Mole Creek	10.12 (72) - 3.13 (31)	Meander	
1952	Elizabeth Town	5.8 (38) - 7.13 (55)	Meander	Elizabeth Town awarded premiership after Meander played an unregistered player
1953	Meander	4.5 (29) - 3.7 (25)	Elizabeth Town	
1954	Red Hills	9.14 (68) - 9.13 (67)	Mole Creek	
1955	Mole Creek	11.9 (75) - 10.12 (72)	Red Hills	
1956	Red Hills	5.10 (40) - 3.6 (24)	Meander	
1957	Red Hills	11.11 (77) - 9.8 (62)	Mole Creek	
1958	Mole Creek	7.7 (49) - 6.12 (48)	Meander	
1959	Chudleigh	9.15 (69) - 7.5 (47)	Mole Creek	
1960	Mole Creek	15.12 (102) - 14.9 (93)	Chudleigh	
1961	Elizabeth Town	11.5 (72) - 7.7 (49)	Meander	
1962	Chudleigh	15.13 (103) - 9.13 (67)	Elizabeth Town	
1963	Mole Creek	10.14 (74) - 10.11 (71)	Chudleigh	
1964	Chudleigh	7.13 (55) - 6.6 (42)	Red Hills	
1965	Red Hills	10.15 (65) - 10.9 (69)	Meander	
1966	Red Hills	10.14 (74) - 9.11 (65)	Chudleigh	
1967	Red Hills	11.7 (73) - 3.11 (29)	Mole Creek	
1968	Mole Creek	13.14 (92) – 9.13 (67)	Red Hills	
1969	Mole Creek	17.12 (114) - 17.5 (107)	Chudleigh	
1970	Mole Creek	13.16 (94) - 7.8 (50)	Red Hills	
1971	Mole Creek	15.9 (99) - 7.9 (51)	Hagley	
1972	Hagley	14.8 (92) - 10.9 (69)	Mole Creek	
1973	Chudleigh	12.15 (87) - 8.15 (63)	Mole Creek	
1974	Hagley	17.6 (108) - 11.14 (80)	Elizabeth Town	
1975	Hagley	8.9 (57) - 8.8 (56)	Chudleigh	
1976	Elizabeth Town	7.12 (54) - 6.10 (46)	Meander	
1977	Mole Creek	13.16 (94) - 8.7 (55)	Meander	
1978	Meander	18.20 (128) - 12.8 (80)	Chudleigh	
1979	Meander	6.16 (52) - 7.8 (50)	Chudleigh	
1980	Mole Creek	Score unknown	Red Hills	Drawn Grand Final
1980	Mole Creek	9.8 (62) - 3.13 (31)	Red Hills	Replay
1981	Red Hills	23.18 (156) - 6.11 (47)	Chudleigh	
1982	Red Hills	16.17 (113) - 7.11 (53)	Chudleigh	
1983	Elizabeth Town	13.20 (98) - 10.13 (73)	Red Hills	
