= Fingal District Football Association =

- Founded: 1924
- Folded: 1992

The Fingal District Football Association was an Australian rules football association in Fingal Valley, Tasmania from 1924 to 1992. Football had been played in the Fingal region since 1884, when the Fingal Football Club was formed.

== History ==
The history of the Association goes back to the 1880s when the town of Mathinna was thriving due to gold mining and had three teams that played each other regularly. At this time, like most competitions in Australia at the time, the team that won the most games were awarded the premiership.

There was a game between Fingal and St Marys recorded in 1884, but regular competition did not commence until the railway line was completed through the Fingal Valley in 1886. Two became three when Avoca joined. The Launceston Examiner reported on Saturday 9 August 1890 that a team from South Esk had journeyed to St Marys and played the local side with the visitors winning by seven points.

Only two Premierships have been recorded, from 1891 and 1907 with Avoca winning both. The odd game was played during World War One and the competition didn't reform again until 1922. The participating clubs in the return season were St Marys, Rovers (Cornwall-Mt Nicholas), Fingal, Avoca and Mathinna. The Association was in recess again from 1934 to 1935. In 1936 Rovers played a draw with Avoca in the grand final, The Rovers had already arranged for a game outside the Association and wanted a delay. When this was refused, they forfeited.. The very next year Avoca received another forfeit, this time from St Marys who had won the original game only for a protest to be upheld and the game ordered replayed. St Marys had already arranged for a game outside the Association and wanted a delay. When this was refused, they forfeited. The Association remained more or less stable until World War 2, when the competition went into recess once again. The Rovers failed to re-appear once the recess ended in 1945.

In 1945 St Helens, Rossarden and Swansea joined the competition bringing the club numbers to seven. Competition was healthy until the 1960s, when Mathinna started to struggle to get teams on the field. They finally folded in 1968, making way for Campbell Town to join the Association. By this time Rossarden were dominating the competition with players like the Lowe and Hawkins Brothers, Gus O’Boyle, Colin Cruikshank, Garry Tapp and coach Bob Miller. They won seven premierships between 1956 and 1967, with five in a row from 1961 to 1965.

In the more recent years of the Association, the competition was looked after by longtime secretary Graham McGee. The players of the era included Bob Bye, Scott Marshall, John Smith, Jack Clements, Les Newman, John Thurley, Steven Salter, Colin Cruickshank, Gus O’Boyle, John and Patrick Cusick, Rob Lowe, Max Davison, Paul Ellis, Norm Barnes and Craig Woods.

The last grand final of the Association was played at St Marys in 1992. St Helens defeated St Marys by 87 points. Campbell Town decided to enter the Northern Tasmanian Football Association leaving only four teams in the competition; St Marys, Fingal, St Helens and Swansea. Rossarden had folded after the 1972 season and Avoca had folded after winning the premiership in 1989. It was decided that a four team competition was not viable. Swansea headed for the Tasman Football Association, while St Helens went into the North East Association. St Marys and Fingal were forced to join Campbell Town in the NTFA.

== Clubs ==
=== Final ===
Club	Colours	Nickname	Home Ground	Former League	Est.	Years in FDFA	FDFA Premierships		Fate
Club	Colours	Nickname	Home Ground	Former League	Est.	Years in FDFA	Total	Years	Fate
Campbell Town		Robins	Campbell Town Recreation Ground, Campbell Town	MFA	1886	1972-1992	6	1973, 1974, 1976, 1977, 1979, 1981	Moved to Esk-Deloraine FA in 1993
Fingal		Blues	Fingal Recreation Ground, Fingal	CFA	1884	1924-1931, 1936-1992	15	1927, 1928, 1931, 1945, 1948, 1949, 1950, 1953, 1955, 1957, 1959, 1969, 1971, 1975, 1988	Moved to Esk-Deloraine FA in 1993
St Helens		Swans	St Helens Recreation Reserve, St Helens	PFA	1910	1951-1992	7	1958, 1960, 1970, 1984, 1985, 1987, 1992	Moved to NEFU in 1993
St Marys		Tigers	St Marys Recreation Ground, St Marys	CFA	1890	1924-1930, 1936-1992	11	1924, 1926, 1929, 1930, 1939, 1946, 1947, 1972, 1983, 1990, 1991	Moved to Esk-Deloraine FA in 1993
Swansea		Bulldogs, Swans	Swansea Oval, Swansea	ECFA	1890s	1961-1992	3	1966, 1978, 1982	Moved to Tasman FA following 1992 season

=== Former ===
Club	Colours	Nickname	Home Ground	Former League	Est.	Years in FDFA	FDFA Premierships		Fate
Club	Colours	Nickname	Home Ground	Former League	Est.	Years in FDFA	Total	Years	Fate
Avoca (Glebe 1925)		Demons	Avoca Oval, Avoca	CFA	1886	1924-1930, 1936-1989	10	1936, 1937, 1938, 1951, 1952, 1954, 1968, 1980, 1986, 1989	Folded after 1989 season
Mathinna		Kill'n'Burns	Mathinna Oval, Mathinna	CFA	1895	1924-1931, 1946-1950, 1952-1968	0	-	Folded after 1968 season
Rossarden		Redlegs	Rossarden Recreation Reserve, Rossarden	–	1952	1952-1972	7	1956, 1961, 1962, 1963, 1964, 1965, 1967	Folded after 1972 season
Rovers	(1924-26, 1929-37) (1927-28)	Rovers	Cullenswood Oval, Cullenswood	–		1924-1931, 1936-1937	1	1925	Folded after 1937 season

== Seniors ==
=== Premiership Winners ===
Spurr Shield Winners

- 1924 - St Marys 7.11 (53) d Fingal 6.4 (40)
- 1925 - Rovers 6.10 (46) d Fingal 4,10 (34)
- 1926 - St Marys 10.16 (76) d Mathinna 8.4 (52)
- 1927 - Fingal 6.15 (51) d Rovers 7.6.48
- 1928 - Fingal 9.14 (68) d St Marys 9.7 (61) *
- 1929 - St Marys 8.12 (60) d Fingal 8.4 (52)
- 1930 - St Marys 11.18 (84) d Fingal 9.10 (64)
- 1931 - Fingal 5.12 (42) d Mathinna 5.5 (35)

Cullenwood Football Association

- 1932 - Mt Nicholas 7.9 (51) d Cornwall 5.6 (36)
- 1933 - Mt Nicholas 7.8 (50) d St Marys 4.9 (33)
- 1934 - Mt Nicholas 11.12 (78) d Rovers 7.5 (47)
- 1935 - St Marys 15.11 (101) d Mt Nicholas 10.8 (68)

Fingal District Football Association

- 1936 - Avoca 6.14 (50) d Rovers 7.8 (50) **
- 1937 - St Marys 19.19 (133) d Avoca 11.19 (85) **
- 1938 - St Marys 6.12 (48) d Avoca 5.9 (39)
- 1939 - St Marys 13.11 (89) d Fingal 10.14 (74)
- 1940 - Competition suspended (World War II)
- 1941 - Competition suspended (World War II)
- 1942 - Competition suspended (World War II)
- 1943 - Competition suspended (World War II)
- 1944 - Competition suspended (World War II)
- 1945 - Fingal 8.10 (58) d St Marys 7.14 (56)
- 1946 - St Marys 10.23 (83) d Avoca 8.8 (56)
- 1947 - St Marys 27.19 (181) d Avoca 13.16 (94)
- 1948 - Fingal d St Marys
- 1949 - Fingal 8.16 (64) d St Marys 6.17 (53)
- 1950 - Fingal 9.8 (62) d St Marys 7.11 (53)
- 1951 - Avoca 7.10 (52) d Fingal 7.7 (49)
- 1952 - Avoca 13.12 (90) d St Marys 9.11 (65)
- 1953 - Fingal 7.18 (60) d St Marys 7.12 (54)
- 1954 - Avoca 10.10 (70) d Fingal 6.19 (55)
- 1955 - Fingal 6.12 (48) d St Marys 4.19 (43)
- 1956 - Rossarden 9.21 (75) d Fingal 7.4 (46)
- 1957 - Fingal 8.11 (59) d St Marys 6.17 (53)
- 1958 - St Helens 9.9 (63) d Fingal 5.6 (36)
- 1959 - Fingal 8.8 (56) d Rossarden 7.12 (54)
- 1960 - St Helens 9.10 (64) d Avoca 9.8 (62)
- 1961 - Rossarden 12.12 (84) d Avoca 7.12 (54)
- 1962 - Rossarden 13.14 (92) d St Helens 6.6 (42)
- 1963 - Rossarden 11.12 (78) d St Helens 9.11 (65)
- 1964 - Rossarden 13.16 (94) d Swansea 9.9 (63)
- 1965 - Rossarden 10.13 (73) d Mathinna 6.14 (50)
- 1966 - Swansea 13.8 (86) d Rossarden 5.16(46)
- 1967 - Rossarden 10.17 (77) d Swansea 4.8 (32)
- 1968 - Avoca 7.12 (54) d Rossarden 7.5 (47)
- 1969 - Fingal 7.7 (49) d St Marys 5.14 (44)
- 1970 - St Helens 7.5 (47) d St Marys 6.7 (43)
- 1971 - Fingal 10.8 (68) d St Marys 8.10 (58)
- 1972 - St Marys 16.5 (101) d Avoca 12.15 (87)
- 1973 - Campbell Town 15.17 (107) d St Helens 4.8 (32)
- 1974 - Campbell Town 8.12 (60) d St Marys 8.5 (53)
- 1975 - Fingal 13.18 (96) d Campbell Town 11.20 (86)
- 1976 - Campbell Town 18.20 (128) d Fingal 10.9 (69)
- 1977 - Campbell Town 14.12 (96) d Fingal 10.9 (69)
- 1978 - Swansea 16.14 (110) d St Helens 11.12 (78)
- 1979 - Campbell Town 11.19 (85) d Avoca 11.11 (77)
- 1980 - Avoca 17.12 (114) d Campbell Town 11.10 (76)
- 1981 - Campbell Town 14.9 (93) d Avoca 13.11 (89)
- 1982 - Swansea 19.12 (126) d Fingal 13.10 (88)
- 1983 - St Marys 10.9 (69) d Fingal 8.10 (58)
- 1984 - St Helens 7.6 (48) d St Marys 5.16 (46)
- 1985 - St Helens 17.9 (111) d Swansea 8.8 (56)
- 1986 - Avoca 14.9 (93) d St Helens 13.8 (86)
- 1987 - St Helens 14.5 (89) d Campbell Town 12.10 (82)
- 1988 - Fingal 11.16 (82) d Swansea 7.10 (52)
- 1989 - Avoca 18.16 (124) d St Helens 14.14 (98)
- 1990 - St Marys 14.14 (98) d Fingal 8.11 (59)
- 1991 - St Marys 17.14 (116) d Fingal 9.10 (64)
- 1992 - St Helens 15.17 (107) d St Marys 3.2 (20)

Note: In the 1928 Grand Final, St Marys won the first grand final but the game was ended with ten minutes to go.
Fingal protested and the Fingal FA determined that the game had to be replayed and it took place two weeks later.

  - In 1936 Avoca were awarded the premiership over Rovers after Rovers refused to play in the grand final replay after the original game was drawn.
  - In 1937 Avoca were awarded the premiership over St Marys after St Marys refused to play in the grand final replay after a protest against St Marys was upheld and the replay ordered.

=== Best and Fairest ===
Best and fairest in the seniors was presented the Athol "Curly" Ellis Memorial Trophy

- 1951 – John Francis (Fingal)
- 1952 – John Francis (Fingal)
- 1953 – John Francis (Fingal)
- 1954 – Eric Furley (Avoca)
- 1955–1960 – unavailable
- 1961 – Richard Press (Swansea)
- 1962 – Max Davidson (Avoca)
- 1963 – Wayne Freeman (Fingal)
- 1964 – John Smith (Fingal)
- 1965 – John Smith (Fingal)
- 1966 – Stan Graham (Swansea)
- 1967 – Bob Bye (St Marys)
- 1968 – Bob Bye (St Marys)
- 1969 – unavailable
- 1970 – Colin Cruickshank (Rossarden)
- 1971 – Kevin Youd (Avoca)
- 1972 – Graeme White (Avoca)
- 1973 – Scott Marshall (Fingal)
- 1974 – Derek Chapple (St Helens)
- 1975 – Terry Freeman (Fingal)
- 1976 – Scott Marshall (Fingal)
- 1977 – Brendan Manion (St Marys)
- 1978 – Robert Simpson (St Helens)
- 1979 – Scott Marshall (Fingal)
- 1980 – Scott Marshall (Fingal)
- 1981 – Stephen Cook (St Marys)
- 1982 – Leon Grice (Swansea)
- 1983 – Mark Donnellan (Fingal)
- 1984 – John Thurley (St Helens)
- 1985 – Andrew Bryan (Avoca)
- 1986 – Mark Harris (Avoca)
- 1987 – Ambrose McDonald (Campbell Town)
- 1988 – Kerry Murfett (Avoca)
- 1989 – Andrew Viney (St Marys)
- 1990 – Patrick Cusick (Swansea)
- 1991 – Lyndon Dakin (St Marys)
- 1992– Patrick Cusick (Swansea)

=== Leading Goal Kickers ===
Year	Player	H&A goals	Finals goals	Total Goals
1966	Lavelle (Swansea)	56	6	62
1967	D Criukshank (Rossarden)	62	7	69
1968	C Criukshank (Rossarden)	28	5	33
1969	Pennington (Avoca)	34	6	40
1970	Clark (Fingal)	40	4	44
1971	Robert Bye (St Marys)	88	14	102
1972	Robert Bye (St Marys)	57	9	66
1973	Wayne Freeman (St Helens)	65	12	77
1974	John Smith (Fingal)	41	0	41
1975	John Smith (Fingal)	55	5	60
1976	Gregory Jestremski (St Helens)	55	12	67
1977	Robert Colgrave (Campbell Town)	31	3	34
1978	Stephen Cleaver (Swansea)	41	3	44
1979	David Lowe (Campbell Town)	36	7	43
1980	Paul Smith (Avoca)	41	6	47
1981	Dale Brown (Campbell Town)	47	4	51
1982	Philip Wickham (Campbell town)	56	1	57
1983	Mark Donnellan (Fingal)	44	4	48
1984	John Thurley (St Helens)	42	7	49
1985	Mark Donnellan (Fingal)	61	6	67
1986	Ian Donnaghy (Avoca)	59	11	70
1987	Squires (St Marys)	48	5	53
1988	Stephen Richards (St Helens)	49	2	51
1989	M.Kean (Swansea)	58	0	58
1990	Michael Viney (St Marys)	57	7	64
1991	Andrew Viney (St Marys)	58	0	58
1992	Andrew Viney (St Marys)	68	2	70

== Cullenswood Football Association (1932-35) ==
Following the departure of St Marys to the East Coast Football Union in 1931 and Mathinna's inability to form a team in 1932, the Fingal District Football Association was left with only Fingal and the Cullenswood Rovers. A new association was formed, with Cullenswood splitting into two new clubs - Cornwall and Mt Nicholas - who were joined by Fingal in the inaugural season. St Marys joined from the ECFU in 1933 and Avoca re-formed and joined in 1935. Mt Nicholas dominated the competition, winning the first three premierships and losing the fourth to St Marys. After the 1935 season the Rovers were re-formed and all clubs returned to the re-formed FDFA.

=== Clubs ===
Club	Colours	Nickname	Home Ground	Former League	Est.	Years in FDFA	FDFA Premierships		Fate
Club	Colours	Nickname	Home Ground	Former League	Est.	Years in FDFA	Total	Years	Fate
Avoca		Demons	Avoca Oval, Avoca	FDFA	1886	1935	0	-	Returned to Fingal District FA in 1936
Cornwall			Cullenswood Oval, Cullenswood	–	1932	1932-1935	0	-	Merged with Mt Nicholas to re-form Rovers in 1936
Fingal		Blues	Fingal Recreation Ground, Fingal	FDFA	1884	1932-1935	0	-	Returned to Fingal District FA in 1936
Mangana			Mangana Football Ground, Mangana	–	1932	1934	0	-	Folded after 1934 season
Mt Nicholas			St Marys Recreation Ground, St Marys	–	1932	1932-1935	3	1932, 1933, 1934	Merged with Cornwall to re-form Rovers in 1936
St Marys		Tigers	St Marys Recreation Ground, St Marys	ECFU	1890	1933-1935	1	1935	Returned to Fingal District FA in 1936
