= 2024 Tasmanian football season =

159th season of Australian rules football in Tasmania

- Date: 29 March – 21 September 2024
- Highest score: M: 62.27 (399) (Sheffield − NWFA, R11)
- Lowest score: M: 0.0 (0) (Rosebery-Toorak − NWFA) (Note: Rosebery-Toorak recorded a score of 0.0 (0) in round 2, round 3, round 7, round 8, round 10, round 12, round 13 and round 16.) (Claremont − SFL, R2); W: 0.0 (0) (South-East Suns − SFL) (Note: South-East Suns recorded a score of 0.0 (0) in round 1, round 2, round 4, round 6, round 7, round 8, round 10, round 11, round 14 and round 16.)

The 2024 Tasmanian football season was the 159th season of Australian rules football in Tasmania. Ten senior leagues – all operating under governing body AFL Tasmania (AFLT) – held competitions, with the highest-level being the Tasmanian State League (TSL).

Almost all leagues operated with a single senior division, consisting of a home-and-away season and a finals series, along with lower-grade reserves and junior competitions. Two competitions (the NTFA and the SFL) had multiple divisions, but none used a promotion and relegation system. Only the NTFA, NWFL and the SFL had women's competitions.

== TSL ==
North Launceston won the TSL premiership for the eighth time, defeating Lauderdale by 20 points in the 2024 TSL Grand Final. The premiership completed a perfect season for North Launceston, which won all of its matches in 2024.

This was the TSL's final season, with the statewide competition disbanded in preparation for the Tasmania Football Club to enter the Victorian Football League (VFL) in 2026. TSL clubs joined the NTFA or the SFL for the 2025 season.

== Circular Head ==
2024 CHFA season
- Date: 20 April – 31 August 2024
- Teams: 4
- Premiers: Redpa; 13th premiership
- Minor premiers: Redpa

Other premiers
- Reserves: Forest-Stanley
- Juniors (boys): U16: Redpa; U12: Redpa

The 2024 CHFA season was the 118th season of the Circular Head Football Association (CHFA).

Redpa won the CHFA premiership for the 13th time and the third year in a row, defeating Irishtown by 37 points in the grand final.

=== Ladder ===
Pos	Team	Pld	W	L	D	PF	PA	PP	Pts	Qualification
1	Redpa (P)	12	11	1	0	957	475	201.5	44	First semi-final
2	Irishtown	12	7	5	0	799	545	146.6	28	Second semi-final
3	Forest-Stanley	12	4	8	0	560	649	86.3	16	Second semi-final
4	Scotchtown	12	2	10	0	444	1091	40.7	8	First semi-final

Rules for classification: 1) points; 2) percentage; 3) number of points for.
(P) Premiers; (W) Club withdrew

=== Finals ===
2024 CHFA Grand Final
Saturday, 31 August (2:00pm)	Redpa	def.	Irishtown	Circular Head Recreation Ground
1.0 (6); 4.3 (27); 4.5 (29); 6.11 (47)	Q1; Q2; Q3; Final	1.0 (6); 1.1 (7); 1.4 (10); 1.4 (10)
C. Gray, H. Johnstone, M. Booth, E. Arnold, N. Bransden, A. Pilkington	Best	K. Everett, M. McAlister, K. Fraser, R. Grey, J. Else

== Darwin ==
2024 DFA season
- Date: 5 April – 31 August 2024
- Teams: 7
- Premiers: Queenstown; 4th premiership
- Minor premiers: Queenstown

Other premiers
- Reserves: Somerset

The 2024 DFA season was the 73rd season of the Darwin Football Association (DFA).

Queenstown won the DFA premiership for the fourth time, defeating Somerset by 13 points in the grand final.

Prior to the start of the season, the Natone Football Club withdrew because of a player shortage. It was the second time in five years that Nantone had entered recess, with the club withdrawing in 2019 before resuming in 2021.

=== Ladder ===
Pos	Team	Pld	W	L	D	PF	PA	PP	Pts	Qualification
1	Queenstown (P)	14	14	0	0	2557	331	772.5	56	Finals series
2	Somerset	14	12	2	0	1382	782	176.7	48	Finals series
3	Ridgley	14	9	5	0	1342	1045	128.4	36	Finals series
4	Yolla	14	5	9	0	1001	1308	76.5	20	Finals series
5	South Burnie	14	5	9	0	950	1416	67.1	20	Finals series
6	Cuprona	14	2	12	0	601	1504	40.0	8	
7	Yeoman	14	2	12	0	572	2019	28.3	8	

Rules for classification: 1) points; 2) percentage; 3) number of points for.
(P) Premiers; (W) Club withdrew

=== Finals ===
2024 DFA Grand Final
Saturday, 31 August (2:00pm)	Queenstown	def.	Somerset	Wivenhoe Recreation Ground
2.3 (15); 7.6 (48); 9.7 (61); 10.10 (70)	Q1; Q2; Q3; Final	2.1 (13); 4.4 (28); 7.7 (49); 8.9 (57)
Z. Mihocek, J. Holland, F. Wray-McCann, J. Clark, M. Newson, L. McKellar	Best	M. Bowen, K. Nicholls, A. Marshall, T. Parker, S. Mawer, T. Smith

== King Island ==
2024 KIFA season
- Date: 4 May – 31 August 2024
- Teams: 3
- Premiers: Currie; 43rd premiership
- Minor premiers: Currie

Other premiers
- Juniors (mixed): Currie

The 2024 KIFA season was the 103rd season of the King Island Football Association (KIFA).

Currie won the KIFA premiership for the 43rd time, defeating Grassy by seven points in the grand final. It was the club's first senior premiership since 2018.

=== Ladder ===
Pos	Team	Pld	W	WF	D	L	PF	PA	%	Pts	Qualification
1	Currie (P)	10	7	0	0	3	887	605	146.6	28	Grand Final
2	Grassy	10	4	1	0	5	689	743	92.7	20	Semi-final
3	North	10	3	0	0	7	571	779	73.3	12	Semi-final

Rules for classification: 1) points; 2) percentage; 3) number of points for.
(P) Premiers

=== Finals ===
2024 KIFA Grand Final
Saturday, 31 August (2:30pm)	Currie	def.	Grassy	Currie Football Ground
2.2 (14); 3.2 (20); 8.5 (53); 8.6 (54)	Q1; Q2; Q3; Final	0.1 (1); 3.4 (22); 3.5 (23); 6.11 (47)
J. Walker, C. Warner, L. Favara Bell, J. Bellchambers, J. Williams, D. Clemons	Best	L. Sartori, S. Reeve, R. Frosi, J. Taylor, C. Stellmaker, R. Esguerra

== NTFA ==
2024 NTFA season
- Date: 6 April – 14 September 2024
- Teams: 19

The 2024 NTFA season was the 29th season of the Northern Tasmanian Football Association (NTFA) senior men's competition and the 6th season of the senior women's competition.

== NWFA ==
The 2024 NWFA season was the 123rd season of the North Western Football Association (NWFA).

Prior to the start of the season, the West Ulverstone Football Club withdrew because of a player shortage. The club had been competing in the NWFA since 2002.

== NWFL ==
The 2024 NWFL season was the 38th season of the North West Football League (NWFL) senior men's competition and the 7th season of the senior women's competition.

Beginning this season, the reserves competition was renamed to the "NTFL development league".

== Oatlands District ==
2024 ODFA season
- Date: 20 April – 17 August 2024
- Teams: 7
- Premiers: Bothwell; 8th premiership
- Minor premiers: Triabunna

The 2024 ODFA season was the 72nd season of the Oatlands District Football Association (ODFA).

Bothwell won the ODFA premiership for the eighth time, defeating minor premiers Triabunna by ten points in the grand final.

=== Finals ===
2024 ODFA Grand Final
Saturday, 17 August (1:30pm)	Bothwell	def.	Triabunna	Oatlands Oval
4.2 (26); 5.3 (33); 10.6 (66); 13.6 (84)	Q1; Q2; Q3; Final	3.0 (18); 6.6 (42); 9.6 (60); 11.8 (74)
W. Campbell, J. Wigg, T. Turner, S. Bone, B. Chaplin, T. Rogers	Best	R. Sweet, B. Anderton, A. Cameron, J. O'Brien, M. Fisher, J. Wilson

== Old Scholars ==
2024 OSFA season
- Date: 4 May – 7 September 2024
- Teams: 6
- Premiers: OHA; 6th premiership
- Minor premiers: OHA

Other premiers
- Reserves: DOSA

The 2024 OSFA season was the 38th season of the Old Scholars Football Association (OSFA).

The round 1 match between DOSA and Hutchins was abandoned at half time because of lighting issues at the TCA Ground.

=== Finals ===
2024 OSFA Grand Final
Saturday, 7 September (2:00pm)	DOSA	def. by	OHA	North Hobart Oval
3.2 (20); 6.2 (38); 7.6 (48); 8.6 (54)	Q1; Q2; Q3; Final	2.1 (13); 6.6 (42); 12.7 (79); 14.11 (95)
D. Curtain, M. Cassidy, Z. Holdsworth, N. McCulloch	Best	R. Bailey, R. Borsboom, S. Storic, M. Haydon, D. Paul, S. Rainbird

== SFL ==
2024 SFL season
- Date: 6 April – 14 September 2024

Men's
- Premiers: Cygnet; 6th premiership
- Minor premiers: Cygnet

Women's
- Premiers: Division 1: North Hobart; Division 2: Claremont
- Minor premiers: Division 1: Kingborough; Division 2: Claremont

Other premiers
- Reserves: Sorell
- Colts: Huonville

The 2024 SFL season was the 29th season of the Southern Football League (SFL) senior men's competition and the 7th season of the senior women's competition.

Following the end of the 2023 season, women's Division 3 was disbanded and absorbed into the existing Division 1 and Division 2 competitions.

Cygnet won the SFL men's premiership for the sixth time and the second year in a row, defeating Lindisfarne by 54 points in the grand final.

After only fielding a standalone team in the SFL reserves competition in 2023, the Hobart Football Club returned to the senior SFL men's competition this season. In November 2024, the SFL executive formally accepted TSL clubs Clarence, Glenorchy, Kingborough, Lauderdale and North Hobart into the competition for the 2025 season as part of the re-established SFL Premier League.

=== Men's ===
==== Ladder ====
Pos	Team	Pld	W	L	D	PF	PA	PP	Pts	Qualification
1	Cygnet (P)	16	15	1	0	2027	579	350.1	60	Finals series
2	Lindisfarne	16	14	2	0	2174	893	243.5	56	Finals series
3	Huonville	16	11	5	0	1902	744	255.7	42	Finals series
4	Brighton	16	10	6	0	1701	827	205.7	40	Finals series
5	Sorell	16	9	7	0	1513	997	151.8	36	Finals series
6	New Norfolk	16	6	10	0	1486	1384	107.4	24	
7	Dodges Ferry	16	5	11	0	1307	1505	86.8	20	
8	Hobart	16	2	14	0	457	2501	18.27	8	
9	Claremont	16	0	16	0	321	3458	9.28	0	

Rules for classification: 1) points; 2) percentage; 3) number of points for.
(P) Premiers; (W) Club withdrew

==== Finals ====
	First qualifying final
Saturday, 24 August (1:30pm)	Lindisfarne 18.8 (116)	def.	Huonville 11.11 (77)	ANZAC Park

	Elimination final
Saturday, 24 August (2:30pm)	Brighton 8.11 (59)	def.	Sorell 3.11 (29)	Thompson Oval

	Semi-final
Saturday, 31 August (2:00pm)	Huonville 14.8 (92)	def.	Brighton 7.8 (50)	Huonville Oval

	Second qualifying final
Saturday, 31 August (2:35pm)	Cygnet 8.10 (58)	def.	Lindisfarne 8.9 (57)	Cygnet Oval

	Preliminary final
Saturday, 7 September (2:00pm)	Lindisfarne 14.7 (91)	def.	Huonville 11.16 (82)	ANZAC Park

2024 SFL Men's Grand Final
Saturday, 14 September (2:00pm)	Cygnet	def.	Lindisfarne	North Hobart Oval
2.3 (15); 8.6 (54); 11.8 (74); 16.9 (105)	Q1; Q2; Q3; Final	2.3 (15); 2.4 (16); 4.6 (30); 7.9 (51)
J. Cowen 4, T. Cowen 2, Fletcher, Walter, Cleeland, Clifford, E. Cowen, Dance, Direen, Lister	Goals	M. Paolini 2, E. Stanley 2, S. Adams, D. Johns, R. Martin
Ashlin, E. Cowen, O'Neill, T. Cowen, Lister, Polley	Best	D. Fyfe, D. Blazely, D. Bailey, D. Zantuck, T. Westbury, S. Smith

=== Women's Division 1 ===
==== Finals ====
2024 SFL Women's Division 1 Grand Final
Sunday, 8 September (1:00pm)	Kingborough	def. by	North Hobart	North Hobart Oval
1.3 (9); 4.5 (29); 4.5 (29); 4.7 (31)	Q1; Q2; Q3; Final	1.1 (7); 1.3 (9); 3.5 (23); 5.5 (35)
G. Bailey, J. Howarth, P. King, M. Lancaster, O. Johnson, P. Odwogo	Best	A. Clark, G. White, E. Bingham, S. Smith, E. Mifsud, E. McGinniss

=== Women's Division 2 ===
==== Finals ====
2024 SFL Women's Division 2 Grand Final
Sunday, 8 September (11:00am)	Claremont	def.	Hutchins	North Hobart Oval
0.3 (3); 2.3 (15); 4.3 (27); 4.5 (29)	Q1; Q2; Q3; Final	1.0 (6); 2.0 (12); 2.0 (12); 3.0 (18)
N. Curtis, K. Stanford, T. Corrie, B. Hollingsworth, B. Horne, A. Saunders	Best	M. Middleton- Miller, R. Cavarretta, M. Garrett, G. Parnham, A. Clark, M. Penrose
