= Cygnet Football Club =

Australian rules football club

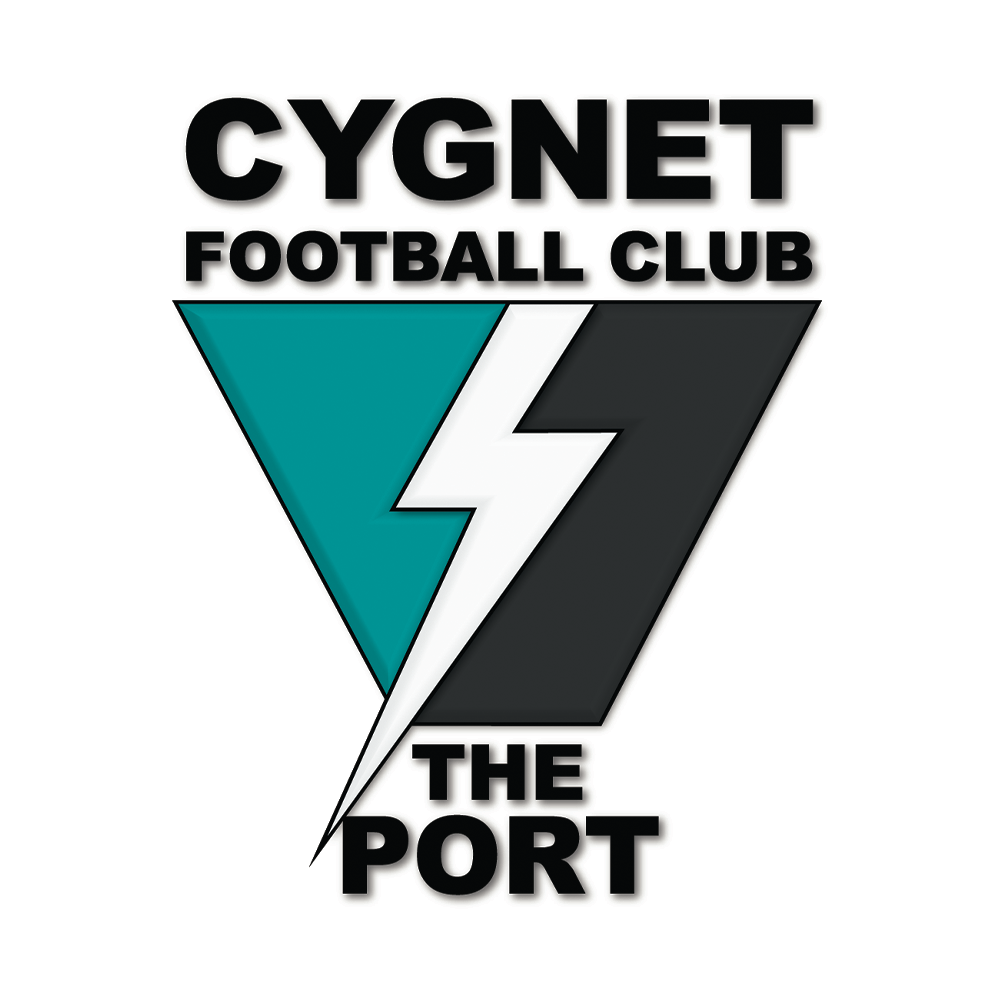

Names
- Full name: Cygnet Football Club
- Former name(s): Port Cygnet Football Club; Lovett Football Club
- Nickname(s): SFL/SFLW: The Port; STJFL: Southern Storm
- Former nickname: Magpies
- Club song: "We're A Happy Team At Cygnet!"

2026 season
- After finals: SFL: 1st SFLW: 3rd
- Home-and-away season: SFL: 1st SFLW: 3rd
- Leading goalkicker: SFL: James Zeitzen (60); SFLW: Stacey Fox (45)
- Best and fairest: SFL: James Zeitzen; SFLW: Hayley Kluga

Club details
- Founded: 1888; 138 years ago
- Colours: Black Teal White
- Competition: Southern Football League
- President: David O'Neill
- Coach: SFL: Lachlan Watt; SFLW: Stacey Fox
- Captain(s): SFL: Will Cleeland; SFLW: Hayley Kluga
- Premierships: SFL (7): 2002; 2003; 2004; 2021; 2023; 2024; 2026; SFLW (1): 2022; HFA (31): 1912; 1913; 1915; 1922; 1923; 1925; 1926; 1928; 1931; 1935; 1938; 1945; 1947; 1948; 1950; 1951; 1955; 1957; 1960; 1962; 1964; 1966; 1967; 1968; 1970; 1972; 1974; 1976; 1979; 1984; 1994; Tasmanian Country Football Champions (2): 1947; 1948
- Ground: Cygnet Oval (4,000); Kermandie Oval; Snug Park (2,800)
- Training ground: Cygnet Oval

Uniforms
Home	Away	Clash

Other information
- Official website: https://cygnetfc.tidyhq.com/

The Cygnet Football Club is an Australian rules football club playing in the Southern Football League, also known as the SFL, in Tasmania, Australia.

It was reported in October 1888 in ‘The Colonist’ that the Port Cygnet Football Club, which ‘had not been in existence long’ played South Franklin at Castle Forbes Bay. The game was described as being played in an ‘amicable spirit’. The newcomers were no match for their opponents and lost five goals to one.

A few weeks later Port Cygnet hosted the Honeywood Football Club from Geeveston. Honeywood proved victorious, winning 1.15 (21) to 0.5 (5). For the home side Howard, Armstrong, Andrews, Andrews, Cockerill and A. Devereaux were the best players.

On or around Queen Victoria’s Birthday in May 1889 there is a report in “The Hobart Mercury” of what could be Port Cygnet’s first ever win. In a match played in very wet and sloppy conditions at Franklin’s home ground at Mr. Kellaway’s paddock in Woodstock, it is reported that Franklin had been “beaten”.

In 1906, Port Cygnet, then renamed Lovett to reflect the change of the town’s name, joined the Huon Football Association for the first time. Up to that point the club just played friendly and challenge matches.

The club changed its name to Cygnet in the 1910s.
The Magpies were a member of the Huon Football Association from 1906-1997 when the league disbanded and they joined the SFL in 1998.
Upon entry in the SFL they changed from their longtime Black & White playing strip and Magpie emblem, adopting a Port Adelaide playing strip (black, white and teal) and called themselves 'The Port'.

== Club Honours ==
Huon Football Association

- Premierships (31): 1912, 1913, 1915, 1922, 1923, 1925, 1926, 1928, 1931, 1935, 1938, 1945, 1947, 1948, 1950, 1951, 1955, 1957, 1960, 1962, 1964, 1966, 1967, 1968, 1970, 1972, 1974, 1976, 1979, 1984, 1994
- Runners Up (16): 1920, 1924, 1929, 1930, 1939, 1946, 1949, 1952, 1954, 1956, 1959, 1969, 1975, 1980, 1983, 1997

Southern Football League

- Premierships (7): 2002, 2003, 2004, 2021, 2023, 2024, 2026
- Runners Up (5): 1998, 2005, 2020, 2022, 2025

Southern Football League Women's

- Premierships (1): 2022
- Runners Up (1): 2021

Southern Football League Reserves'

- Premierships (2) 2004, 2025
- Runners Up (3) 2003, 2022, 2023

Southern Football League Colts’

- Premierships (4) 2020, 2021, 2025, 2026
- Runners Up (5) 2005, 2017, 2018, 2019, 2024

Tasmanian Country Football Champions

- Premierships (2): 1947, 1948

== Club Records ==
=== Game Records ===
Highest Score

- HFA – Unknown
- SFL – 52.17 (329) v Claremont - Abbotsfield Park (Round 8, 29 May 2021)
- SFLW – 25.14 (164) v Dodges Ferry - Kermandie Oval (Round 7, 23 May 2026)

Lowest Score

- HFA – Unknown
- SFL – 1.2 (8) v New Norfolk - Cygnet Oval (Round 13, 12 July 2014)
- SFLW – 0.5 (5) v Lauderdale - Lauderdale Oval (Round 2, 21 April 2023)

Highest Scoring Quarter

- SFL – 15.6 (96) v Claremont (3rd Qtr) - Cygnet Oval (Round 17, 14 August 2021)
- SFLW – 9.2 (56) v Dodges Ferry (1st Qtr) - Kermandie Oval (Round 17, 23 May 2026)

Biggest Wins

- HFA – Unknown
- SFL – 329 points v Claremont - Abbotsfield Park (Round 8, 29 May 2021)
- SFLW – 164 points v Dodges Ferry - Kermandie Oval (Round 7, 23 May 2026)

Biggest Losses

- HFA – Unknown
- SFL – 249 points v New Norfolk - Cygnet Oval (Round 13, 12 July 2014)
- SFLW – 90 points v New Norfolk - Cygnet Oval (Round 1, 6 April 2024)

Highest Score Conceded

- SFL – 39.23 (257) v New Norfolk Cygnet Oval (Round 13, 12 July 2014)
- SFLW – 16.8 (104) v New Norfolk - Cygnet Oval (Round 1, 6 April 2024)

Lowest Score Conceded

- SFL – 0.0 (0) (2021, Round 8, v Claremont, Abbotsfield Park; 2021, Round 17, v Claremont, Cygnet Oval)
- SFLW – 0.0 (0) (2022, Round 12, v North Hobart, North Hobart Oval; 2022, Round 6, v Huonville, Cygnet Oval; 2023, Round 10, v South East Suns, Pembroke Park; 2024, Round 2, v South East Suns, Pembroke Park; 2024, Round 7, v Lindisfarne; Anzac Park; 2024, Round 14, v Brighton, Cygnet Oval)

Most Goals In A Game

- SFL – 52 v Claremont - Abbotsfield Park (Round 8, 29 May 2021)
- SFLW – 25 v Dodges Ferry - Kermandie Oval (Round 7, 23 May 2026)

=== Season Records ===
Most Season Wins

- HFA – Unknown
- SFL – 18 wins (2002)
- SFLW – 13 wins (2022, 2025)

Fewest Season Losses

- HFA – Unknown
- SFL – 1 loss (2024, 2025, 2026)
- SFLW – 1 loss (2022)

Longest Unbeaten Streak

- HFA – Unknown
- SFL – 24 games (Round 13, 2024 - Qualifying Final, 2025)
- SFLW – 14 games (Round 2, 2022 - Round 1, 2023)

Club Record Attendance
5,310 v Huonville Lions (2025 SFL Grand Final)

=== SFL Head-to-head record ===
Played: 503 Won: 278 Drawn: 2 Lost:223 (Last updated – End of 2026 SFL season)

Opponent	GP	W	D	L	For	Agn	%	Win%	100+F	100+A
Brighton	34	22	1	11	3100	2543	121.90	64.70	12	7
Central Hawks	12	3		9	924	1160	79.65	25.00	3	5
Channel	24	21		3	2401	1247	192.54	87.50	12	2
Claremont	57	34		23	6857	4622	148.35	59.64	27	21
Clarence	1	0		1	65	105	61.90	0	0	1
Dodges Ferry	53	30		23	4746	4729	100.35	56.60	21	18
East Coast Bombers	10	3		7	745	1002	74.35	30.00	3	5
Glenorchy	2	0		2	106	290	36.55	0	0	2
Hobart	35	23		12	3780	2598	145.49	65.71	16	10
Huonville Lions	67	41	1	25	6300	5489	114.77	61.19	23	13
Kermandie	28	19		9	2657	2026	131.14	67.85	13	6
Kingborough	15	6		9	1121	1543	72.65	40.00	0	8
Lauderdale	14	9		5	1267	1002	126.44	64.28	6	3
Lindisfarne	55	25		30	4828	5159	93.58	45.45	22	25
New Norfolk	41	21		20	3305	4010	82.41	51.21	13	18
North Hobart	1	0		1	40	155	25.80	0	0	1
Sorell	45	33		12	4464	3185	140.15	73.33	18	10
Triabunna	9	8		1	1529	462	330.95	88.88	7	0

=== SFLW Head-to-head record ===
Played: 169 Won: 99 Drawn: 0 Lost:70 (Last updated – End of 2026 SFLW season)

Opponent	GP	W	D	L	For	Agn	%	Win%
Brighton	9	8		1	621	223	227.47	88.88
Claremont	16	2		14	367	724	50.69	12.50
Dodges Ferry	5	5		0	555	25	2220.00	100.00
Hobart	7	7		0	574	28	2050.00	100.00
Huonville Lions	20	16		4	777	283	274.55	80.00
Hutchins	12	5		7	379	310	122.25	41.66
Kingborough	3	1		2	133	61	218.03	33.33
Lauderdale	15	10		5	478	364	131.31	66.66
Lindisfarne	18	11		7	799	656	121.79	61.11
New Norfolk	13	8		5	891	363	245.45	61.53
North Hobart	11	4		7	359	505	71.08	36.36
Sorell	3	3		0	250	49	510.20	100.00
South East Suns	12	4		8	265	465	56.98	33.33
St Virgils	5	5		0	379	49	773.46	100.00
University	20	11		9	654	548	119.34	55.00

== Individual Honours ==
=== Competition awards ===
Ivan Short Medal (HFA best and fairest)

- 1954 – Leon Synnott
- 1962 – Brian Bowden
- 1963 – Allan Fletcher
- 1965 – Marty Brereton
- 1971 – Ray Gordon
- 1972 – John Bone
- 1974 – Laurence Jarrett
- 1980 – Geoff Haughland
- 1987 – Greg Gordon
- 1990 – Greg Gordon
- 1993 – Gary Williamson
- 1996 – Tony Madigan
- 1997 – Trad Page & Micheal Darcy

William Leitch Medal (SFL best and fairest)

- 2001 – Damien Dillon
- 2021 – Thor Boscott

Peter Hodgman Medal (SFL best first year player)

- 2004 – Jeremy Brereton

SFL Leading Goalkicker

- 1998 – Micheal Darcy – 106
- 2003 – Micheal Darcy – 113 (Regional League)
- 2004 – Micheal Darcy – 105 (Regional League)
- 2005 – Micheal Darcy – 100 (Regional League)
- 2007 – Micheal Darcy – 103 (Regional League)
- 2013 – Ben Halton – 88
- 2020 – Josh Fox – 61

SFLW Leading Goalkicker

- 2022 – Stacey Fox – 48 (Division Two)

SFL Team of The Year

- Jakob Lister – 2022, 2023
- James Webb – 2022
- Toby Cowen – 2022
- James Zeitzen – 2022, 2026
- Joseph Direen – 2022, 2023, 2024, 2025, 2026
- Lachlan Watt – 2022, 2023, 2024, 2025, 2026
- Will Cleeland – 2023, 2024
- Jackson Simpson – 2024
- Jackson Gordon – 2024
- Will Polley – 2024, 2025
- Luke Ashlin – 2025, 2026
- Lochie Griggs – 2025, 2026
- Nathan Duggan – 2026

SFLW Team of The Year

- Ella Brereton – 2024
- Hayley Kluga – 2024, 2025, 2026
- Amy Sharp – 2024, 2025, 2026
- Abbie Jones – 2025, 2026
- Georgia Jones – 2025, 2026
- Stacey Fox – 2025, 2026

=== Grand final best on ground awards ===
Tony Martyn Medal (SFL Regional League Grand Final best on ground)

- 2002 – Gordon Shaw
- 2003 – Heath Dillon
- 2004 – Grant Clark

Gorringe-Martyn Medal (SFL Grand Final best on ground)

- 2021 – Thor Boscott
- 2023 – Thor Boscott
- 2024 – Luke Ashlin
- 2026 – Nathan Duggan

Cara Brooke Medal (SFLW Grand Final best on ground)

- 2022 – Ellie Doyle

=== Club awards ===
Synnott Brothers Best & Fairest (SFL best and fairest)

- 1998 – Wayne Lamb
- 1999 – Heath Dillon
- 2000 – Gerard Oakford
- 2001 – Micheal Darcy & Julian Direen
- 2002 – Heath Dillon
- 2003 – Damien Dillon
- 2004 – Grant Clark
- 2005 – Damien Clark
- 2006 – Grant Clark
- 2007 – Grant Clark
- 2008 – Bradley Watson
- 2009 – Bradley Watson
- 2010 – Bradley Watson
- 2011 – Bradley Watson
- 2012 – Bradley Watson
- 2013 – Adam Duggan
- 2014 – Rhys Jennings
- 2015 – Brayden Hayes
- 2016 – Ben Halton
- 2017 – Ben Halton
- 2018 – Toby Cowen
- 2019 – Ben Halton
- 2020 – Joshua Fox
- 2021 – Lachlan Watt
- 2022 – Joseph Direen
- 2023 – Jakob Lister
- 2024 – Will Cleeland
- 2025 – Lochie Griggs
- 2026 – James Zeitzen

Gladys Sculthorpe Memorial Best & Fairest (SFLW best and fairest)

- 2017 – Caitlyn Phillips
- 2018 – Serena Hubert
- 2019 – Stacey Fox
- 2020 – Ellie Doyle
- 2021 – Ellie Doyle
- 2022 – Mackenzie Ford
- 2023 – Ellie Doyle
- 2024 – Abbie Jones
- 2025 – Abbie Jones
- 2026 – Hayley Kluga

== Player Records ==
Club Games Record Holder
450 by Greg Gordon (310: Seniors - 110: Reserves - 30: Underage) between 1973-1998

Senior Games Record Holder
345 by Laurence 'Ocker' Jarrett

Record Goals In A Match
HFA - 22.4 by Greg Howard v Franklin (24 July 1976)
SFL - 15 by Micheal Darcy v Channel (2 June 2007)
SFLW - 8 by Stacey Fox v North Hobart (15 July 2022)

== SFL Honour Board ==
Year	Position	Minor rounds	%	Finals	President	Coach	Captain	Best & Fairest	Leading goalkicker	
Southern Football League
1998	Second	14–4–0	175	2–2–1	B.Direen	W.Lamb	T.Page	W.Lamb	M.Darcy^{✪}	119
1999	Sixth	11–7–0	114	–	B.Direen	W.Lamb	T.Page	H.Dillon	M.Darcy^{2}	80
2000	Sixth	13–7–0	130	1–1–0	A.Madigan	W.Lamb	T.Page	G.Oakford	G.Oakford	53
SFL Regional League
2001	Eighth	10–8–0	92	0–1–0	A.Madigan	J.Frawley	T.Page	M.Darcy; Julian Direen	M.Darcy^{3}	83
2002 ⚑	First	15–3–0	244	3–0–0	A.Madigan	G.Williamson	Julian Direen/Damien Dillon	H.Dillon^{2}	D.Walter	74
2003 ⚑	First	16–2–0	240	2–0–0	D.B.Direen	G.Williamson^{2}	Julian Direen^{2}	D.Dillon	M.Darcy^{4✪}	122
2004 ⚑	First	16–2–0	210	2–0–0	G.Howard	G.Williamson^{3}	Julian Direen^{3}	G.Clark	M.Darcy^{5✪}	117
2005	Second	16–2–0	222	1–1–0	G.Howard	A.Cole	Julian Direen	D.Clark	M.Darcy^{6✪}	108
2006	Ninth	4–14–0	71	–	I.Coulson	A.Cole	Julian Direen	G.Clark^{2}	A.Chandler	30
2007	Sixth	10–8–0	124	–	I.Coulson	S.Bozicevic	Julian Direen	G.Clark^{3}	M.Darcy^{7✪}	103
2008	Ninth	4–14–0	69	–	A.Jurd	M.Darcy	B.Watson	B.Watson	M.Darcy^{8}	57
Southern Football League
2009	Tenth	4–14–0	49	–	J.Direen	M.Darcy	B.Watson	B.Watson^{2}	B.Halton	31
2010	Ninth	5–13–0	83	–	J.Direen	G.Williamson	B.Watson	B.Watson^{3}	B.Halton^{2}	41
2011	Eighth	6–14–0	58	–	D.B.Direen	M.Tyrell	B.Watson	B.Watson^{4}	B.Halton^{3}	62
2012	Sixth	7–8–1	84	–	D.B.Direen	M.Tyrell	A.Palmer	B.Watson^{5}	B.Halton^{4}	50
2013	Seventh	9–9–0	87	–	D.B.Direen	M.Tyrell	A.Palmer	A.Duggan	B.Halton^{5✪}	88
2014	Tenth; Wooden Spoon	1–17–0	38	–	D.O'Neill	M.Tyrell	A.Palmer	R.Jennings	M.Darcy^{9}	30
2015	Tenth; Wooden Spoon	4–14–0	41	–	D.O'Neill	G.Quirk	R.Jennings; M.Direen	B.Hayes	B.Hayes	38
2016	Third	10–8–0	103	1–2–0	D.O'Neill	G.Quirk	R.Jennings	B.Halton	B.Halton^{6}	72
2017	Fourth	9–7–0	111	1–1–0	D.O'Neill	B.Cato	R.Jennings	B.Halton^{2}	J.Halton	67
2018	Fifth	9–7–0	109	0–1–0	D.O'Neill	B.Cato	R.Jennings	T.Cowen	B.Halton^{7}	45
2019	Fourth	8–6–0	128	1–1–0	D.O'Neill	B.Cato	A.Palmer	B.Halton^{3}	B.Halton^{8}	58
2020	Second	6–2–0	143	2–1–0	D.O'Neill	B.Cato	A.Duggan	J.Fox	J.Fox^{✪}	61
2021 ⚑	First	13–2–0	337	3–0–0	D.O'Neill	T.Boscott^{★}	R.Jennings	L.Watt	J.Lane	49
2022	Second	14–2–0	255	2–2–0	D.O'Neill	T.Boscott	L.Watt	Joe Direen	Joe Direen	70
2023 ⚑	First	12–2–0	235	3–1–0	D.O'Neill	T.Boscott^{2}	L.Watt	J.Lister	Joe Direen^{2}	52
2024 ⚑	First	15–1–0	350	2–0–0	D.O'Neill	L.Watt	Joe Direen; N.Duggan	W.Cleeland	Joe Direen^{3}	96
SFL Community League
2025	Second	16–0–0	357	1–1–0	D.O'Neill	L.Watt	Joe Direen; W.Cleeland	L.Griggs	Joe Direen^{4}	56
2026 ⚑	First	15–1–0	285	2–0–0	D.O'Neill	L.Watt^{2}	W.Cleeland	J.Zeitzen	J.Zeitzen	60
⚑ = Premier / ★ = League Best and Fairest / ✪ = League Leading Goalkicker / ^{2} = Multiple Best & Fairest or Leading Goalkicker

== SFLW Honour Board ==
Year	Position	Minor rounds	%	Finals	President	Coach	Captain	Best & Fairest	Leading goalkicker	
Southern Football League Women's
2017	Fourth	3–11–0	42	0–1–0	D.O'Neill	T.Phillips	C.Phillips	C.Phillips	N/A	–
2018	Seventh	4–12–0	101	–	D.O'Neill	R.Schuettpelz	M.Cowen	S.Hubert	E.Direen	–
2019	Eighth	7–9–0	105	–	D.O'Neill	M.Munnings	S.Kluga	S.Fox	S.Fox	–
2020	Sixth	6–4–0	172	–	D.O'Neill	J.Kluga	M.Cowen	E.Doyle	S.Fox^{2}	29
SFLW Division Two
2021	Second	10–2–0	183	1–1–0	D.O'Neill	J.Kluga	S.Kluga	E.Doyle^{2}	S.Fox^{3}	32
2022 ⚑	First	11–1–0	509	2–0–0	D.O'Neill	J.Kluga	S.Kluga	M.Ford	S.Fox^{4✪}	48
2023	Fifth	8–8–0	140	0–1–0	D.O'Neill	C.Ashlin	E.Brereton	E.Doyle ^{3}	A.Sharp	29
2024	Third	11–3–0	286	1–1–0	D.O'Neill	S.Fox	E.Brereton	A.Jones	A.Sharp^{2}	44
SFLW Community League
2025	Fourth	12–4–0	307	1–1–0	D.O'Neill	S.Fox	H.Kluga	A.Jones^{2}	S.Fox^{5}	47
2026	Third	11–5–0	372	1–1–0	D.O'Neill	S.Fox	H.Kluga	H.Kluga	S.Fox^{6}	45
⚑ = Premier / ★ = League Best and Fairest / ✪ = League Leading Goalkicker / ^{2} = Multiple Best & Fairest or Leading Goalkicker
