= Daffy (disambiguation) =

Daffy Duck is a Warner Bros. cartoon character.

Daffy may also refer to:

- Paul Dean (baseball) (1912-1981), American baseball player
- Phillip DeFreitas (born 1966), English cricketer
- Nick Daffy (born 1973), Australian football player
- Boulton Paul Defiant, a British Second World War interceptor aircraft nicknamed "Daffy"
- Daffy's Elixir, a patent medicine

== See also ==
- Daffé
- Daffey
- Gaffey
- Laffey
