= Daffey =

Daffey is a Welsh surname. Notable people with the surname include:

- Mark Daffey (1908–1967), Australian rules footballer
- Paul Daffey (fl. 2001–2013), Australian sports journalist

== See also ==
- Daffé
- Daffy
- Gaffey
- Laffey
