= Sam Banks =

Australian rules footballer (born 2003)

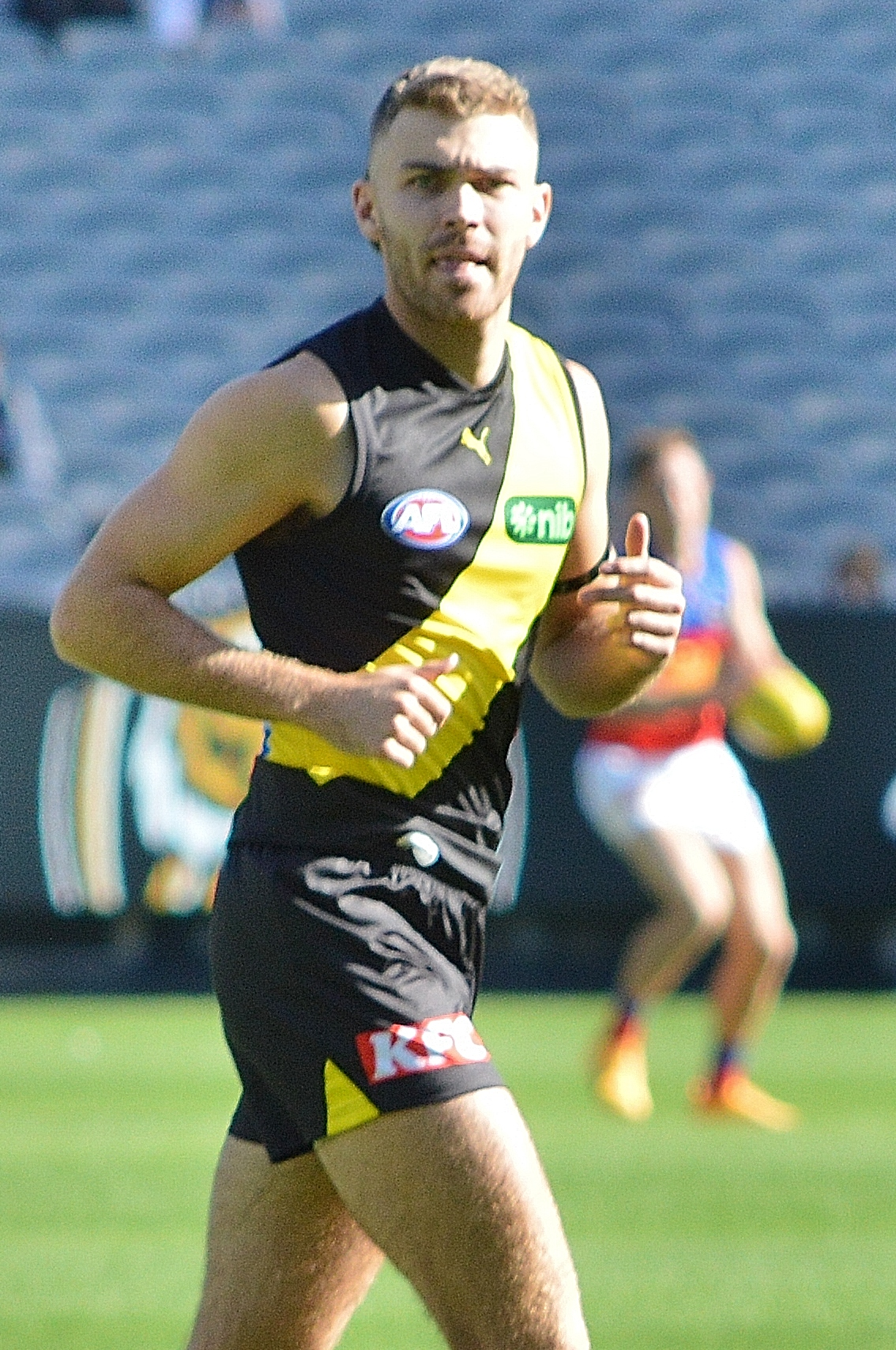
- Banks playing for Richmond in April 2025

Personal information
- Full name: Samuel Banks
- Born: 2 April 2003 (age 23)
- Original teams: Tasmania Devils (NAB League); Clarence Football Club (TSL)
- Draft: No. 29, 2021 AFL National Draft: Richmond
- Debut: Round 17, 2023, Richmond vs. Sydney, at MCG
- Height: 187 cm (6 ft 2 in)
- Weight: 74 kg (163 lb)
- Position: Half-back / Wing

Club information
- Current club: Richmond
- Number: 6

Playing career^{1}
Years	Club	Games (Goals)
2022–	Richmond	61 (7)
- ^{1} Playing statistics correct to the end of 2026.

Career highlights
- Tasmania captain: 2021, 2019; NAB League team of the year: 2021; U16 All-Australian: 2019; U16 national championships division 2 MVP: 2019

Samuel Banks (born 2 April 2003) is a professional Australian rules footballer playing for the Richmond Football Club in the Australian Football League (AFL). Banks was drafted by Richmond with the 29th pick in the 2021 AFL draft, and made his AFL debut in round 17 of the 2023 season.

== Early life and junior football ==
Banks was raised in Whitefoord, Tasmania, a regional town 53 kilometres north of Hobart. He attended school at Oatlands District High School and Guilford Young College and played junior football for Woodsdale, Sorell and Central Hawks football clubs.

Banks participated in top-level representative football from a young age, including captaining Tasmanian representative sides at Under 12 and Under 15 level. In 2019 he made his senior debut for Clarence in the senior division of the Tasmanian State League, played Under 18 football for Tasmania Devils in the NAB League and captained the State's side at the Under 16s national championships. He played three matches at the tournament, averaging 24 disposals and earned selection in the All-Australian team and as the Division 2 Most Valuable Player.

Banks' participation in representative football was limited in 2020, particularly owing to the cancellation of the NAB League due to the impacts of the COVID-19 pandemic. He did however feature at senior level again for Clarence in the State League.

In 2021 Banks was a member of the elite development AFL Academy. He returned to NAB League football as captain of Tasmania that year, but suffered a broken wrist in a match against Eastern Ranges in April. The injury ruled him out for much of the remainder of the pandemic-affected season. He finished the year having averaged 22 disposals, six rebound-50s and two intercept marks per game, and earned selection to the league's team of the year.

The ongoing effects of his injury saw Banks excluded from the Allies squad for the 2021 Under 19 national championships, although state border movement restrictions due to the ongoing pandemic ultimately hindered Tasmanian representatives from travelling and playing.

== AFL career ==
=== 2022 season ===
Banks was drafted by Richmond with the club's fourth pick and the 30th selection overall in the 2021 AFL draft. He did not make an appearance at AFL level in his first season, instead playing 17 games with the club's reserves team in the VFL.

=== 2023 season ===
Banks made his debut in round 17 of the 2023 season.

== Statistics ==
Updated to the end of round 22, 2026.

Legend
G	Goals	K	Kicks	D	Disposals	T	Tackles
B	Behinds	H	Handballs	M	Marks

Season	Team	No.	Games	Totals							Averages (per game)							Votes
Season	Team	No.	Games	G	B	K	H	D	M	T	G	B	K	H	D	M	T	Votes
2023	Richmond	41	6	1	2	55	27	82	17	8	0.2	0.3	9.2	4.5	13.7	2.8	1.3	0
2024	Richmond	41	15	1	2	111	69	180	35	22	0.1	0.1	7.4	4.6	12.0	2.3	1.5	0
2025	Richmond	41	22	4	3	305	159	464	102	47	0.2	0.1	13.9	7.2	21.1	4.6	2.1	2
2026	Richmond	6	16	1	1	169	106	275	54	26	0.1	0.1	10.6	6.6	17.2	3.4	1.6	0
Career			59	7	8	640	361	1001	208	103	0.1	0.1	10.8	6.1	17.0	3.5	1.7	2
