= Kifa =

Kifa or KIFA may refer to:കിഫ - KIFA

- Kiffa, city and department in Mauritania
- Killed in flight accident
- King Island Football Association, Tasmania, Australia
- Kiribati Islands Football Association
