= Evenings with Mark Fine =

Australian radio program

Evenings with Mark Fine was a program on Melbourne sports radio station 1116 SEN that ran from March 2007 to December 2017.

Mark Fine had been host of the program since 2007 and had been one of only two presenters to have been with the station continuously since its inception until he lost his job at SEN in the revamp after Craig Hutchison was made CEO at the start of 2018 (the other being Kevin Hillier). Evenings with Mark Fine ran from 7pm to midnight Monday to Thursday during the AFL season and over the same time frame from Monday to Friday during the non-AFL period.

The program consisted of a number of regular segments such as the fitness hour with Craig Harper, radio game show Initially Speaking with Troy Zantuck and 'Milney', Team Talk with Gus Smarrini, Bush and the Burbs, covering suburban and country football with Paul Daffey as well as a soccer hour with Michael Zappone and David Davutovic. There was also a weekly feature interview with a former AFL footballer or sporting star facilitated by Geoff Poulter. AFL journalists such as Ashley Browne, Nick Bowen, Howard Kotton, Nigel Carmody and Brett Anderson were regulars on the program as well as former players such as Campbell Brown, Adam Cooney, Scott Lucas, Chris Bryan and Terry Wallace.

A regular on the evening program was outspoken lawyer Stephen J. Peake. Often the butt of Fine's vitriol, Peake played the role of brow-beaten blowhard with good humor and excellent wit. The on-air dynamic between Fine and Peake bore no resemblance to their off-air relationship, where they share a close friendship and deep mutual respect.

The longest running segment on the evening program was an industry-respected golfing hour called Chasing Birdies hosted by former tour professionals Mark Allen and Craig Spence.

Over the history of Evenings with Mark Fine the host had been joined by co-hosts including AFL stars Martin Pike, Jason Johnson, Gavin Crosisca, Robert Shaw, David Armitage, Michael Jamieson and Dom Gleeson; NRL stars Cameron Smith, Brett Finch and Steve Turner. Former Socceroos Archie Thompson, Clint Bolton, and David Clarkson as well as Melbourne Victory’s Grant Brebner. He was also joined regularly by cricketers John Hastings, Bryce McGain, Rob Quiney, Adam Dale and Nick Jewell.

Arguably the most controversial but respected segment on Evenings with Mark Fine was The Right Time co-hosted by Mick Hall, principal of Dayhab Rehab facility and former Collingwood premiership player, Gavin Crosisca - himself a former addict now a qualified drug and alcohol counselor. The program aired weekly for over three years then monthly on a Monday night and dealt with the issues faced by addicts, former addicts and the family and friends of addicts. Recognised in the health industry as a ground breaking program for commercial radio in Australia, The Right Time received a City of Melbourne, Lord Mayors award in 2015.

In January 2018, Crocmedia took over ownership of 1116 SEN and in the subsequent merging of SEN and Crocmedia the on air weekly lineup was significantly altered, resulting in Mark Fine being made redundant and ending his near 14 year stint at the station. With the departure of Fine so ended over a decade of Evenings with Mark Fine.
