= Laffy =

Laffy is the surname of:

- Gerry Laffy (born 1960), English singer and guitarist
- Michael Laffy (born 1967), former Australian rules footballer and contestant on the Australian reality TV show The Mole
- Simon Laffy (born 1958), English bassist

== See also ==
- Laffy Taffy, a brand of taffy manufactured by Nestlé
- "Laffie", an episode of the TV series It's Garry Shandling's Show
- Laffey, a surname
- USS Laffey, two US Navy destroyers
