= Sorell Football Club =

Australian rules football club

Names
- Full name: Sorell Football Club Inc.
- Nickname: Eagles
- Club song: "We Are The Mighty Sorell Team"

2025 season
- After finals: 5th
- Home-and-away season: 5th
- Leading goalkicker: Jacob Sawford (43)

Club details
- Founded: 1883; 143 years ago
- Colours
- Competition: Southern Football League
- President: Robbie Iles
- Coach: Jack Johnstone
- Captain(s): Men's :Adrian Butterworth / Alexander Jones; Women's: Olivia Hudson
- Premierships: TAFL Southern Division (3): 1966; 1983; 1990; South Eastern District FA (3): 1960; 1961; 1962; Clarence Sub-Districts FA (1): 1952; Pembroke FA (3): 1937; 1938; 1939
- Ground: Pembroke Park (capacity: 1000)
- Former ground: Sorell Showground (Until 1966); Sorell Memorial Oval (1967-1991)

Uniforms
Home	Away	Heritage

The Sorell Football Club, nicknamed the Eagles, is an Australian rules football club currently playing in the SFL Community League in Tasmania, Australia. From 1996–1999, the club was known as the East Coast Eagles. The club was formely nicknamed the Saints.

The club is based in the semi-rural township of Sorell 27 km east of Hobart and recruits from many small towns in its district. They play their home matches at Pembroke Park, where they have been based since 1992.

== History ==
=== 1883 - 1995 ===
Sorell Football Club in 1908

The Sorell Football Club was officially founded in 1883, though a club bearing the same name, and also playing Australian rules football, existed in 1882. Sorell originally played in several competitions including the Sorell Football Association, Pembroke Football Association, Clarence Sub-Districts Football Association, East Coast Football Association, and the South Eastern District Football Association until 1962.

In 1904 Sorell deafeted New Norfolk in the Brown Trophy. They also won the trophy in 1907 and 1908.

In 1945, the club colours were changed to black and white. In 1949, Sorell joined the South East District Football Association. In 1954, the club won two premierships in the Southern Country and East Coast competitions.

In 1963 the Eagles joined the TAFL (Southern Division) where they won three premiership titles in 1966, 1983 and their most recent premiership in 1990, they remained a member of that competition until the League collapsed at the end of the 1995 season.

In 1967 Sorell Racecourse Ground, where the club played home games, was destroyed in the 1967 Tasmanian fires. In 1967 the Club started playing home games at Sorell Memorial Oval, until 1991 when they moved to Pembroke Park (which stands on the same same site formerly occupied by Sorell Racecourse Ground).

=== 1996 - present ===
In 1996 Sorell switched from playing in their traditional Red, White, and Black playing uniform to a West Coast Eagles-style Blue and Gold uniform which they still use. The team was also breifly renammed the East Coast Eagles until 1999.

Since 1996 Sorell have been a member of the STFL/SFL and were a participating club in the SFL Regional League when the competition split into two divisions (2002-2008) apart from 2002 when the club played in the SFL Premier League and in 2003 when the club went into recess for one season due to a lack of volunteers to run the club before rejoining the Regional League in 2004.

Sorell's time in the SFL has seen little success; the Eagles' have made the finals a number of times and participated in two grand finals which resulted in a 77-point defeat at the hands of Cygnet in 2004, and a narrow 10-point loss to South-Eastern rival, Dodges Ferry in 2006.

In 2015, the first stage of a $2.8 million redevelopment of Sorell's home ground, Pembroke Park, was opened.

In 2024, former AFL player Paul Puopolo played a cameo appearance for Sorell in their match against Lindisfarne.

In 2025, Sorell fielded their first official women's side. Sorell's Men's team made the it to the Elimination Final in 2025, but were defeated by Lindisfarne. Following the defeat coach Simon Harris stepped down, and was replaced by Jack Johnstone, who had previously captained the club in 2006.

In 2026, Sorell ended a decade long losing streak against Cygnet, with a narrow margin of 14.7 (91) to 11.19 (85).

== Club identity and culture ==
=== Guernseys ===
Sorell Football Club in 1929

The club's current home guernsey is based on the West Coast Eagles uniforms of blue and gold, with blue shorts and socks.

The club has previously worn kits with the main colours of black, white, and red, including a kit similar to that of the St Kilda Football Club. During the 140th anniversary celebrations of the club, they again donned the St. Kilda colours.

==== Uniform evolution ====
Sorell; Football Club (1908)	Sorell; Football Club (1945 - 1952)	Sorell; Football Club (1960)	Sorell; Saints (1970-1995)

East Coast; Eagles (1996 - 1999)	Sorell; Eagles (2000 - 2019)	Sorell; Eagles (2020 - 2023)	Sorell; Eagles (2024 - present)

=== Rivalries ===
Sorell has a rivalry with New Norfolk Eagles named the Eagles Derby.

== Club Honours ==
Entered STFL/SFL
1996

STFL/SFL Premierships
Nil

STFL/SFL Runner Up
2004, 2006

TAFL (Southern Division) Premierships
1966, 1983, 1990

State Amateur Premierships – Condor Shield
1966

South Eastern District FA Premierships
1960, 1961, 1962

Clarence Sub-Districts FA Premierships
1952

Pembroke FA Premierships
1937, 1938, 1939

== Individual Honours ==
=== Walter Howard Medal winners ===
The Walter Howard Medal is awarded to the Best and fairest player in the TAFL (Southern Division)
1968 – Graeme Jones
1982 – Lindsey White
1987 – Lindsey White
1988 – Michael Waller
1990 – Michael Waller
1991 – M. Kerslake

=== Games record holder ===
Mark Clothier (410 games)

=== AFL Players ===
The following Sorell players have played in the Australian Football League:

- Royce Hart
- Sam Iles
- Tom Collier
