= Gaffey =

Gaffey (alternately Mac/Mc Gaibhidhe) is a surname originated from South Connacht almost exclusively to the area around Athlone.

== History ==
Originally Mac the name was Anglicized to Gaffey in the 17th century. There has been confusion about the origins of the Gaffey name, some people believing that the name came from England or Scotland and moved to Ulster during the Ulster plantation and moved again to Connacht in the wake of the O'Donnells. This has been disproven as they did not come from Donegal nor did they settle in north Connacht like other Ulster families. A poet named O'Dugan wrote in "The Topographical Poem" of a sept called Mac Gaibhidh, describing their location as a "land of fruit" it was clearly not the west or north of Connacht but instead the southern Roscommon area. It is thought that the Gaffeys are descendants of Vikings who sailed down the River Shannon and settled near the Viking town, Athlone. The name Mac Gaibhidhe comes from the Irish "mac an gabha" which translates to "Son of the Smith". Irish people called Vikings "The Blacksmiths" for their skills at iron work and it is believed that this is where the Gaffey name originates. There is more confusion to the name Gaffey as not all Gaffeys are from the original Mc Gaibhidhe name. some small branches of the Gaffney family moved from Britain to Connacht during some unknown point of time and converted their name to Gaffey as they hibernicized. And Gaffeys that moved to Scotland and Australia changed their names to Gaffney. And the name Gaffey and Hackett (surname) have such similar coat of arms that they are often confused with each other by heraldry websites.

== Coat of arms ==
The Gaffey coat of arms is a white chief containing three green shamrocks or trefoils symbolising peace, authority and perpetuity, the rest of the shield is Royal blue (azure) containing three fish (vertical) symbolising loyalty and virtue. The motto of the Gaffey family is "Fortitudine et prudentia" meaning Courage and Caution. The family colors of the Gaffey family are royal blue and white as shown by their mantle. and their crest is a golden crown below a double-headed eagle supporting two serpents lifting a tiara.

== People ==
Notable people with the surname include:

- Hugh Joseph Gaffey (1895–1946), Chief of Staff for General George Patton's Third Army during World War II
- John Tracy Gaffey (1860–1935), journalist, politician, real-estate speculator and investor at the turn of the 20th century in Los Angeles, California
- Michael Gaffey (1893–1961), police chief of San Francisco from 1951 and 1955
- Michael James Gaffey, planetary scientist who specializes in deriving the mineralogies of asteroids from their reflectance spectra
- Nigel Gaffey (born 1970), Australian rugby league footballer
- Patrick T. Gaffey (1853–1889), member of the California State Assembly from 1880 to 1881
- Thomas Gaffey, member of the Connecticut State Senate from 1995 to 2011

== See also ==
- 3545 Gaffey (1981 WK2), a Main-belt Asteroid discovered in 1981

== Sources ==
- "Supplement Irish families" by Edward MacLysaght M.A, D.Litt., M.R.I.A
- "Historic Families" Aston house, Dublin
