= New Norfolk District Football Club =

Australian rules football club

New Norfolk

Names
- Full name: New Norfolk District Football Club
- Former name: Derwent Football Club
- Nickname: Eagles
- Former nickname: Hawks
- Club song: "We Are The Mighty Eagle Team!" (Tune: "Road To Gundagai")

2025 SFL Community League season
- After finals: 7th from 8
- Home-and-away season: 7th from 8
- Leading goalkicker: Jacob Daley (39)

Club details
- Founded: 1878; 148 years ago
- Colours
- Competition: SFL Community League
- President: Steve Balmforth
- Coach: Josh Farrow
- Captain: Josh Farrow
- Premierships: TFL (3): 1906; 1968; 1982; SFL (7): 2005; 2009; 2010; 2012; 2013; 2014; 2017; SFLW (1): 2022; Southern District FA (2): 1939; 1945; Southern Country FA (3): 1928; 1930; 1933; Derwent Valley FA (1): 1920; Tasmanian State Premiership (1): 1968
- Ground: Boyer Oval (capacity: 5,000)
- Former grounds: Lachlan Park
- Kensington Park

Uniforms
Home	Away

The New Norfolk District Football Club, nicknamed The Eagles, is an Australian rules football club currently playing in the Southern Football League, in Tasmania, Australia.

== History ==
=== Origins ===
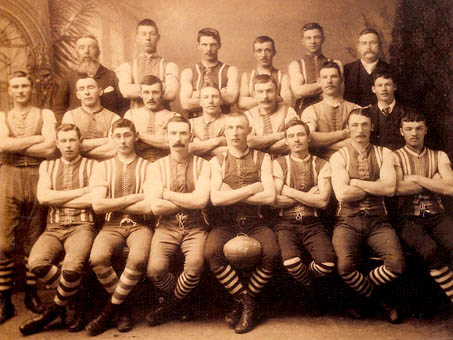
An early team of 1892.

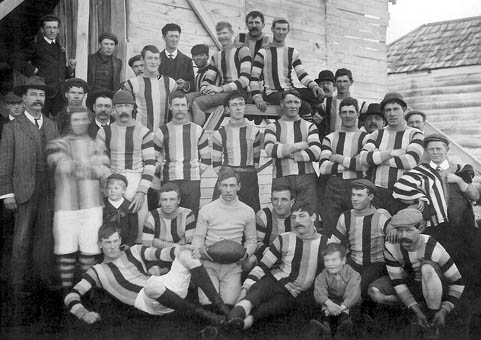
The New Norfolk F.C. in 1910.

The club was founded in 1878 with the first premiership won in 1891 under the name "Derwent Football Club", which would last until the late 1890s. With the "New Norfolk" name the team won the Southern Country Championship in 1904, the Brown Trophy (1906), the Ellis Dean (1908–1909) and the Corumbene Trophy (1910, 1913).

World War I ceased the club activity. In 1920 New Norfolk defeated Molesworth to win the Derwent Valley Football Association Premiership. Then came the Cyril Nash Trophy in which New Norfolk defeated Scottsdale by three points at York Park in 1921 and Clarence in 1922. The club’s next three premierships came in the Southern Tasmanian Country Football Association in 1928, 1930 and 1933, which would be the last year in the SCFA.

In 1934 New Norfolk played at Southern District Football Association, where it lasted until 1946 (excluding the World War II years). The following year the club entered to TANFL/TFL, where it played until 1999, joining the Southern Football League in 2000.

=== TANFL and District Football ===
In 1944 TANFL directors met to discuss restructuring of the league which was scheduled to return in 1945 after three seasons in recession due to World War Two. The clubs would represent their various districts rather than being individual clubs. Two new clubs (Hobart & Sandy Bay) would join at the expense of Cananore and Lefroy which went out of existence during the World War Two cessation.

In 1947 the TANFL voted to include a further two clubs (Clarence – formed in 1903 and New Norfolk – formed in 1878) from the Southern District Football Association for a three-year probationary period, on 7 August 1950, the clubs unanimously voted to retain the two clubs as permanent members of the competition.

In early 1986 the TANFL went into liquidation and a newly constituted Tasmanian Football League replaced it as the sport's governing body.

The TFL initiated the new competition as the TFL Statewide League with all six former TANFL clubs involved, North Launceston and East Launceston also joined the competition from the NTFA in early 1986.

However, the new-look competition did not garner the support of the football public at either end of the state at first, with the lowest attendance recorded was 470 at KGV Football Park when New Norfolk hosted South Launceston on 28 June.

In 1987 the Devonport Football Club joined the competition under a new Blues emblem, along with Burnie Hawks (formerly the Cooee Bulldogs), which created a ten-club competition with all three regions now represented. All clubs were required to field teams in seniors, reserves and under-19s competition from that season.

At first the competition appeared well balanced with three different clubs – Glenorchy, North Hobart and Devonport – winning the league's first three premierships and, importantly, the strong level of competition produced a very high standard of football.

Of even greater importance, the league began to be well supported by players, clubs, sponsors, the general public and the media – which had for many years been unenthusiastic about Tasmanian football – was now giving the TFL Statewide League its full support.

The TFL administration had also been lax in their financial control of the competition and by 1992 it was servicing a debt of $300,000 and growing as crowd numbers continued to plummet.

By 1997 the league appeared to be in deep trouble, the level of interest in the TFL had continued to drop as crowds continued to stay away in droves as the competition had evolved into a two-horse race. The preceding five premierships had been won by just two clubs – Clarence and North Launceston.

Faced with enormous debts and dismal attendances, four clubs were to quit the TFL at the end of the 1997 season. By 1998, the TFL was on the brink of collapse. In a leaked document to the Hobart Mercury newspaper, the following was an official list of club debts at the completion of the 1998 TFL Statewide League season: Burnie Dockers ($735,819), Devonport ($709,067), New Norfolk ($431,858), Glenorchy ($267,897), North Hobart ($232,607), Northern Bombers ($167,570), Clarence ($153,441), Southern Districts ($80,000). With the debt level continuing to rise, New Norfolk left the League and sort permission to join the Southern Football League.

When AFL Tasmania decided to commit to a statewide league for the 2009 season former TFL club New Norfolk (1947–1998) was not invited to join the league because of their poor financial position. New Norfolk have dominated in the Southern Football League, playing in eleven Grand Finals and winning seven of them.

== Honours ==
=== Premiership Titles ===
Entered STFL/Premier League/SFL
2000

SFL Premierships
2005, 2009, 2010, 2012, 2013, 2014, 2017

SFL Runner Up
2000, 2004, 2011, 2015

SFLW Premierships
2022 (Division Three)

TFL Premierships
1906, (Note: As Derwent FC) 1968, 1982

TFL Runner Up
1959, 1964, 1970, 1972, 1981, 1983, 1994

Tasmanian State Premierships
1968

Southern District FA Premierships
1939, 1945

Southern District FA Runner Up
1934

Southern Country FA Premierships
1928, 1930, 1933

Southern Country FA Runner Up
1927, 1931, 1932

Derwent Valley FA Premierships
1920

Southern Country Championship Winners
1904, 1906, 1908, 1909, 1910, 1913

==== Record Home Attendance ====
7,981 v Clarence on 14 June 1965 at North Hobart Oval
4,710 v Clarence on 25 April 1964 at Boyer Oval
An unofficial crowd just short of 5,000 was reported to have attended a home match against Huonville at Boyer Oval on 16 June 2012 in the Southern Football League.

==== Record Finals Attendance ====
24,413 v Clarence on 12 September 1970 at North Hobart Oval

==== Club Record Score ====
(SFL) 40.36 (276) v Triabunna 4.5 (29) on 5 June 2010 at Triabunna Recreation Ground
(TFL) 39.17 (251) v Clarence 11.12 (78) on 30 July 1983 at Boyer Oval
(SFLW) 33.19 (217) v Lauderdale 0.0 (0) on 30 July 2022 at Boyer Oval

=== Individual honours ===
==== All-Australian Team Selection ====
1966 – Peter Hudson

==== William Leitch Medal winners ====
(Best & Fairest player in TFL and SFL Seniors)
1948 – Jim Brown
1952 – Cliff Busch
1954 – Bruce Roe
1955 – Rex Garwood
1958 – Rex Garwood
1961 – Roger Browning
1962 – Roger Browning
1972 – Ricky Graham
1974 – Tony Browning
1981 – Robbie Dykes
1985 – Graham Hunnibell
1990 – Ricky Hanlon
1993 – Rene Peters
2002 – Matthew Jones (Awarded Retrospectively)
2004 – Brock Ackerley & Roger Belcher (tied)
2007 – Brad Carver> 2009 – Roger Belcher
2011 – Nathan Ross
2012 – Michael Thompson
2013 – Nathan Ross
2014 – Caden Wilson

==== Darrel Baldock Medal winners ====
(Best player in TFL Statewide League Grand Final)
1994 – Jason Wilton

==== Gorringe-Martyn Medal winners ====
(Best Player in SFL Grand Final)
2005 – Michael Thompson
2009 – Sam Hall
2010 – Matthew Smith
2012 – Brad Carver
2013 – Nathan Ross
2014 – Nathan Ross
2017 – Jason Laycock

==== Lefroy Medal winners ====
(Best Player in Interstate Matches)
1965 – Peter Hudson
1982 – Graham Hunnibell
1983 – Michael Hunnibell
1984 – Wayne Fox
1985 – Wayne Fox

==== Weller Arnold Medal winners ====
1966 – Barry Browning
1970 – Ricky Graham

==== George Watt Medal winners ====
(Best & Fairest Player – TFL Reserves)
1953 – T. Maddox
1964 – Ken Latham
1965 – Ken Latham
1967 – Robert Wilton
1970 – L. Barratt
1973 – G. Richardson
1974 – R. Wylie
1979 – N. Bester
1983 – Steven Sutton
1986 – Robbie Crane
1991 – Brendan Skelly
1992 – Justin Rainbird
1993 – Adrian Jeffries

==== Major V.A Geard Medal winners ====
(Best & Fairest Player – TFL Thirds)
1963 - Graeme Glover.
1964 - Harold Wilton.
1966 - Tony Browning.
1967 - Gary Barnes.
1970 - Kerry Edwards.
1971 - Tim Woodham.
1976 – Steven Sutton.
1977 – Dan Munnings.
1986 – Jason Taylor.
1988 – Steven Byers.
1995 – Rikki Braslin.

(Best and Fairest - SFL Colts)
2002 - Ashley Rhodes.
2003 - Adam Whitford.
2006 - Brett Booth.
2014 - Jake Foster.

==== Doug Plaister Medal winners ====
(Best & Fairest Player – TFL Fourths)
1975 – Paul Jarvis
1980 – Leigh Brooks
1981 – Mark Hall
1982 – Mark Hall
1983 – Michael Eiszele
1984 – Jason Taylor
1988 – Paul Banks-Smith
1989 – Paul Barrow
1991 – John Cooley
1993 – Ricky Braslin
1994 – Damien Triffitt
1995 – Craig Haremza & Damien Triffitt

===== TFL Leading Goalkickers =====
1963 – Peter Hudson (79)
1964 – Peter Hudson (86)
1965 – Peter Hudson (110)
1966 – Peter Hudson (103)
1983 – Wayne Fox (135)
1984 – Wayne Fox (93)
1985 – Wayne Fox (130)
1987 – Paul Dac (80)
1990 – Paul Dac (103)
1991 – Paul Dac (133)

==== SFL Leading Goalkickers ====
2003 – Matthew Smith (67)
2005 – Sean Salter (72)
2009 – Adrian Burdon (106)
2012 – Michael Thompson (101)
2014 – Josh Hall (112)

==== Club Record Games Holder ====
Luke Joseph (383 total games)
Michael Eiszele (340 total games)

==== Club Record Senior Games ====
Roger Belcher (301)
Chris Sproule (264)
Hedley Thompson (254)

==== Club Record Reserves Games ====
Josh Kelly (218) Dean King (180)

==== Club Record Goalkicking (Single Match) ====
18.6 – Brendan Fevola v Huonville Lions on 16 June 2012 at Boyer Oval
