= Mark Daffey =

Australian rules footballer, born 1908

Personal information
- Full name: Mark Daffey
- Born: 9 April 1908
- Died: 14 April 1967 (aged 59)
- Original team: South Bendigo
- Height: 173 cm (5 ft 8 in)
- Weight: 67 kg (148 lb)

Playing career^{1}
Years	Club	Games (Goals)
1930–33	Hawthorn	37 (26)
- ^{1} Playing statistics correct to the end of 1933.

Mark Daffey (9 April 1908 – 14 April 1967) was an Australian rules footballer who played with Hawthorn in the Victorian Football League (VFL).
