= USS Laffey =

USS Laffey may refer to:

- USS Laffey (DD-459), a Benson-class destroyer lost during the Naval Battle of Guadalcanal, 1942
- USS Laffey (DD-724), an Allen M. Sumner-class destroyer built in 1943; served at least into 1975
