= King Island Football Association =

Australian rules football competition in Tasmania

The King Island Football Association (KIFA) is an Australian rules football competition held in Tasmania, Australia. Three clubs from small communities on King Island compete for the premiership every year.

== History ==
The formation of the competition was originally thought to be in 1908. However the first games were played in 1903 between North and Currie football clubs. The King Island Football Association (KIFA) was formed in 1914 with the introduction of the third team the Pegarah rovers.The competition peaked at 4 teams in the 1950s with the introduction of the Grassy and Mount Stanley football clubs.In the interim Pegarah Rovers had folded, Pegarah and loorana fielded teams but disbanded by 1938.

One of Australia's most isolated, and almost certainly its smallest football league, the three teams play ten games each in a fifteen round competition plus finals.

The King Island Football Association played under the Victorian Football Association's rival throw-pass rules from 1946 until 1948, meaning that throwing the football in general play was legal during those years.

== Clubs ==
=== Locations ===
Locations of the KIFL clubs

=== Current ===
Club	Colours	Nickname	Home Ground	Est.	Years in KIFA	KIFA Premierships	
Club	Colours	Nickname	Home Ground	Est.	Years in KIFA	Total	Years
Currie		Robins	Currie Football Ground, Currie	1904	1904-	44	1907, 1908, 1910, 1912, 1919, 1920, 1921, 1923, 1924, 1926, 1929, 1931, 1933, 1934, 1935, 1937, 1939, 1948, 1954, 1960, 1962, 1963, 1964, 1967, 1968, 1972, 1975, 1977, 1979, 1981, 1982, 1986, 1988, 1989, 1990, 1992, 1995, 1996, 2010, 2011, 2016, 2018, 2024, 2025
Grassy		Hawks	Grassy Football Oval, Grassy	1919	1919; 1939-	17	1946, 1947, 1949, 1953, 1955, 1957, 1958, 1978, 1998, 2005, 2006, 2009, 2012, 2014, 2015, 2021, 2022, 2023
North		Bulldogs	Currie Football Ground, Currie	1904	1904-	47 (Australian record)	1906, 1913, 1914, 1915, 1922, 1925, 1927, 1928, 1930, 1932, 1938, 1940, 1945, 1950, 1951, 1952, 1956, 1959, 1961, 1965, 1966, 1969, 1970, 1971, 1973, 1974, 1976, 1980, 1983, 1984, 1985, 1987, 1991, 1993, 1994, 1997, 1999, 2000, 2001, 2002, 2003, 2004, 2007, 2008, 2013, 2017, 2019

== Previous clubs ==
Club	Colours	Nickname	Home Ground	Est.	Years in KIFA	KIFA Premierships	
Club	Colours	Nickname	Home Ground	Est.	Years in KIFA	Total	Years
Loorana		Magpies	Currie Football Ground, Currie	1928	1928–1938	1	1936
Mount Stanley		Tigers	Grassy Football Oval, Grassy	1949	1949–1971	0	-
Pegarah		Rovers		1914	1920–1927	0	-

== Premierships ==
List of premiership teams of KIFA.

- 1904 unknown
- 1905 unknown
- 1906 NORTH
- 1907 CURRIE
- 1908 CURRIE
- 1909 Unknown
- 1910 CURRIE
- 1911 Unknown
- 1912 CURRIE
- 1913 NORTH
- 1914 NORTH
- 1915 NORTH
- 1916 NO PREMIERSHIP AWARDED
- 1917 NO PREMIERSHIP AWARDED
- 1918 NO PREMIERSHIP AWARDED
- 1919 CURRIE
- 1920 CURRIE
- 1921 CURRIE
- 1922 NORTH
- 1923 CURRIE
- 1924 CURRIE
- 1925 NORTH
- 1926 CURRIE
- 1927 NORTH
- 1928 NORTH
- 1929 CURRIE
- 1930 NORTH
- 1931 CURRIE
- 1932 NORTH
- 1933 CURRIE
- 1934 CURRIE
- 1935 CURRIE
- 1936 LOORANA
- 1937 CURRIE
- 1938 NORTH
- 1939 CURRIE
- 1940 NORTH
- 1941 NO PREMIERSHIP AWARDED
- 1942 NO PREMIERSHIP AWARDED
- 1943 NO PREMIERSHIP AWARDED
- 1944 NO PREMIERSHIP AWARDED
- 1945 NORTH
- 1946 GRASSY
- 1947 GRASSY
- 1948 CURRIE
- 1949 GRASSY
- 1950 NORTH
- 1951 NORTH
- 1952 NORTH
- 1953 GRASSY
- 1954 CURRIE
- 1955 GRASSY
- 1956 NORTH
- 1957 GRASSY
- 1958 GRASSY
- 1959 NORTH
- 1960 CURRIE
- 1961 NORTH
- 1962 CURRIE
- 1963 CURRIE
- 1964 CURRIE
- 1965 NORTH
- 1966 NORTH
- 1967 CURRIE
- 1968 CURRIE
- 1969 NORTH
- 1970 NORTH
- 1971 NORTH
- 1972 CURRIE
- 1973 NORTH
- 1974 NORTH
- 1975 CURRIE
- 1976 NORTH
- 1977 CURRIE
- 1978 GRASSY
- 1979 CURRIE
- 1980 NORTH
- 1981 CURRIE
- 1982 CURRIE
- 1983 NORTH
- 1984 NORTH
- 1985 NORTH
- 1986 CURRIE
- 1987 NORTH
- 1988 CURRIE
- 1989 CURRIE
- 1990 CURRIE
- 1991 NORTH
- 1992 CURRIE
- 1993 NORTH
- 1994 NORTH
- 1995 CURRIE
- 1996 CURRIE
- 1997 NORTH
- 1998 GRASSY
- 1999 NORTH
- 2000 NORTH
- 2001 NORTH
- 2002 NORTH
- 2003 NORTH
- 2004 NORTH
- 2005 GRASSY
- 2006 GRASSY
- 2007 NORTH
- 2008 NORTH
- 2009 GRASSY
- 2010 CURRIE
- 2011 CURRIE
- 2012 GRASSY
- 2013 NORTH
- 2014 GRASSY
- 2015 GRASSY
- 2016 CURRIE
- 2017 NORTH
- 2018 CURRIE
- 2019 NORTH
- 2020 No competition
- 2021 GRASSY
- 2022 GRASSY
- 2023 GRASSY
- 2024 CURRIE
- 2025 CURRIE

== Published books ==
- Australian rules football in Tasmania, John Stoward, 2002, ISBN 0-9577515-7-5
- Beyond the Big Sticks, Paul Daffey, 2003, ISBN 0-7344-0498-0
