= Laffey =

Laffey is a surname. Notable people with the surname include:

- Aaron Laffey (born 1985), American Major League Baseball pitcher
- Alice L. Laffey (1944–2023), American Biblical scholar
- Bartlett Laffey (1841–1901), Irish-born United States Navy sailor and Medal of Honor recipient
- Bernie Laffey (born 1928), former Australian rules footballer
- Marcus Laffey, pen name of The New Yorker columnist and author Edward Conlon (born 1965)
- Merv Laffey (1925–2007), Australian rules footballer
- Michael Laffey (1863–?), American politician
- Steve Laffey (born 1962), American politician, businessman, author and filmmaker
- Thomas J. Laffey (born 1943), Irish mathematician
- Tony Laffey, footballer who represented New Zealand in 1958

== See also ==
- Laffy, another surname
