= Kermandie Football Club =

Former Australian rules football club in Tasmania

Kermandie

Names
- Full name: Kermandie Football Club
- Former name(s): Liverpool Football Club
- Nickname(s): Robins
- Former nickname(s): Bushrangers , Kangaroos
- Club song: "The Kermandie Boys are Happy"

Club details
- Founded: 1887 (Note: The Age reported the club to be 127 years old when it ceased in 2010, which would make the year that it started around 1883, not 1887.)
- Dissolved: 2010; 15 years ago
- Colours
- Competition: Southern Football League
- Premierships: SFL (3): 2000; 2005; 2007; Huon FA (23): 1905; 1910; 1911; 1916; 1919; 1921; 1924; 1927; 1929; 1930; 1936; 1937; 1939; 1946; 1949; 1952; 1954; 1956; 1961; 1965; 1969; 1993; 1996
- Ground(s): Kermandie Oval

Uniforms
Home	Away

The Kermandie Football Club was an Australian rules football club that was founded in 1887 and played in the Southern Football League in Tasmania, Australia. The club ceased to exist in March 2010.

== Honours ==
=== Club ===
- Huon Football Association
  - Premierships (23): 1905, 1910, 1911, 1916, 1919, 1921, 1924, 1927, 1929, 1930, 1936, 1937, 1939, 1946, 1949, 1952, 1954, 1956, 1961, 1965, 1969, 1993, 1996
  - Runners Up (12): 1921, 1928, 1934, 1938, 1948, 1953, 1958, 1962, 1970, 1977, 1988, 1995
- Southern Football League
  - Premierships (3): 2000, 2005, 2007

=== Individual ===
Peter Hodgeman Medalists

- 2007 - Andrew Nash

William Leitch Medalists
Nil.

Club Record Games Holder
400 by Shane O'Neil

Club Record Attendance
5,401 - Kermandie 13.11 (89) v New Norfolk 8.11 (59) - 2000 SFL Grand Final at North Hobart Oval

Club Record Score
Not Documented.
