= Central Hawks =

Australian rules football club

Names
- Full name: Central Hawks Football Club
- Nickname: Hawks

2012 season
- Home-and-away season: 11th

Club details
- Founded: 2005; 21 years ago
- Dissolved: 2012
- Colours
- Competition: Southern Football League
- President: Nick Webb
- Coach: Todd Lewis
- Captain: Clinton Brown / Josh Nibbs
- Ground: Oatlands Recreation Oval; Bothwell Recreation Ground

Uniforms
| Home | Away |

The Central Hawks Football Club is an Australian rules football club currently in recess. It had been in the Southern Football League (SFL), in Tasmania, Australia.

== History ==
The Central Hawks were formed in 2005 following the merger of Bothwell, Oatlands and Kempton Football Clubs from the Oatlands District Football Association. They entered the Southern Football League in 2006.

In 2013, the Central Hawks were forced to go into recess because of a lack of player numbers. The Hawks first entered the SFL in 2006 as a combination of former ODFA clubs Oatlands, Bothwell and Kempton. But Bothwell has re-entered the ODFA for this year in its own right. It would be a ten team competition with a final five format.

== Records ==
Entry to Southern Football League

- 2006

SFL premierships

- Nil.

SFL runner up

- Nil.

Finalists

- 2007, 2009, 2010

Results

- Games - 130, wins - 52, losses - 78

Club record games holder

- 119 - Leigh Wilson - as at End 2012 Season

Club record score

- Central Hawks 33.24 (222) v Triabunna 2.3 (15) on Round 4 2008 at Bothwell Oval.
