= Michael Gaffey =

- Born: January 21, 1893; County Roscommon, Ireland
- Died: March 4, 1961 (aged 68)

Michael Gaffey (January 21, 1893 – March 4, 1961) was the police chief of San Francisco between 1951 and 1955.

== Early life ==
Gaffey was born in County Roscommon, Ireland near Ballinasloe in 1893, moved to San Francisco at the age of twenty and joined the police department in 1921. Gaffey was awarded the Purple Heart for his service in World War I.

== Television ==
According to University of San Francisco historian, John B. Mc Gloin, S.J., in 1950, Dragnet based in Los Angeles was one of the most popular radio crime-dramas. San Francisco Mayor Elmer Robinson asked Chief Gaffey to contact Los Angeles Police Chief William H. Parker, "for tips on how to handle 'show business' to make a crime drama based in San Francisco." NBC broadcast Dragnet. The Columbia Broadcasting System produced The Lineup on radio 1950-1953 and CBS television 1954–1960. The radio series had been set in an undistinguished, unnamed "great American city", but the TV version was specifically set in San Francisco, and was filmed on location with the technical assistance of the SFPD. During the end credits of The Lineup, Chief Gaffey's name appeared in the same manner as Chief Parker's on Dragnet. The show would also be remembered by its syndicated title, San Francisco Beat. Gaffey was pleased by the no-nonsense acting by Warner Anderson as Lieutenant Ben Guthrie and Tom Tully as Inspector Matt Grebb. Quinn Martin recalled, in 1971, The Lineup, aka San Francisco Beat, when he produced The Streets of San Francisco.

== Actions ==
In 1954, he disbanded the "super" vice squad claiming that prostitution, gambling, and bookmaking in SF had dropped to an "irreducible minimum."

He is buried at Holy Cross Cemetery in Colma, California.

== Sources ==
- Obituary, San Francisco Chronicle March 6, 1961
- California Deaths, 1940–1997
