= Daffé =

Daffé is a surname. Notable people with the surname include:

- Abdul Daffé (born 1962), Senegalese judoka
- Aissata Daffé (born 1956), Guinean politician
- Arfang Daffé (born 1991), Senegalese professional footballer
- Charlotte Daffé, Guinean politician

== See also ==
- Daffey
- Daffy
