= Merv Laffey =

Australian rules footballer

Personal information
- Full name: Mervyn Patrick Laffey
- Born: 3 July 1925; Footscray, Victoria
- Died: 17 January 2007 (aged 81)
- Original team: District League
- Height: 170 cm (5 ft 7 in)
- Weight: 75 kg (165 lb)
- Position: Rover

Playing career^{1}
Years	Club	Games (Goals)
1945–52	Footscray	72 (85)
- ^{1} Playing statistics correct to the end of 1952.

Mervyn Patrick Laffey (3 July 1925 – 17 January 2007) was an Australian rules footballer who played with Footscray in the Victorian Football League (VFL).
