= Southern Football League (Tasmania) =

Australian rules football league in Tasmania, Australia

- Current season, competition or edition: 2026 SFL season
- Formerly: Southern Tasmanian Football League (STFL)
- Sport: Australian rules football
- Founded: 1996; 30 years ago
- President: David O'Byrne
- No. of teams: 17
- Country: Australia
- Most recent champion: Premier: Lauderdale Community: Cygnet (2026)
- Most titles: New Norfolk (7); Cygnet (7)
- Website: SFL website

The Southern Football League (SFL) is an Australian rules football league based in the state of Tasmania.

== History ==
=== Beginning and growth ===
The Southern Tasmanian Football League (STFL) was founded in 1996. The league's original clubs were those of the recently defunct Tasmanian Amateur Football League (Southern Division) (Southern Amateurs) and two clubs from the Huon Football Association.

In the first season, the competing clubs from the Tasmanian Amateur Football League (Southern Division) were Brighton, Lauderdale, Lindisfarne, Claremont, Sorell and Lachlan, and those from the Huon Football Association were Kingston (Kingborough) and Channel.

Despite the lopsided results in many of the matches in its first two seasons, the STFL soon began to rival its long-established counterpart, the TFL Statewide League for attendances, community involvement, players, and money, as players and fans alike became tired of the politics and negativity that permeated the floundering TFL at that time.

With the demise of the 114-year-old Huon Football Association at the end of the 1997 season, and financially crippled former TFL club Hobart opting to pull out of the Statewide League at the end of the same season and voting to join the STFL, the league was ready for an influx of new teams as one of its foundation clubs, Lachlan, who had endured terrible struggles for several years, went out of business at the end of 1997.

Kermandie (then known as the Robins) and Cygnet (then known as the Magpies) were forced to change playing uniforms and emblems (to Bushrangers and The Port respectively) owing to clashes with already established clubs Brighton and Claremont.

Huonville Bulldogs merged with fellow Huon Football Association rival Franklin Lions to become the Huonville Lions and thus joined the STFL in 1998. Hobart (then known as the Tigers) were forced to change their emblem and playing strip owing to a clash with Kingston (Kingborough).

From 1998, the STFL became known as the Southern Football League.

New Norfolk District Football Club, a member of the TFL since 1947, left the TSFL at the end of 1999 and joined the SFL in 2000 as the New Norfolk 'Derwent' Hawks.

Following the collapse of the SWL in December 2000, the three remaining State League clubs (Clarence, Glenorchy and North Hobart) all sought admission to join the SFL.
After numerous meetings and much debate it was decided to accept the three orphaned clubs into the league in early 2001 to create a 15-team competition for that season.

=== Premier League and Regional League split ===
In 2002 the SFL split into two conferences – Premier League and Regional League.

The Premier League consisted of former TFL clubs Clarence, Glenorchy, North Hobart, Hobart and New Norfolk along with Kingston, Brighton and Sorell.

The Regional League consisted of Cygnet, Channel, Huonville Lions, Kermandie, Claremont, Lauderdale, Lindisfarne and former Tasman Football Association club Dodges Ferry, admitted into the league after the TFA folded at the end of the 2001 season.

In early 2003 the Sorell Football Club was forced to leave the Premier League after the club was unable to find enough volunteers to run the club and therefore went into recess for that season, its Premier League position was taken over by Lauderdale the following year.

Two new additions to the SFL Regional League in 2006 saw former Oatlands District Football Association clubs Oatlands, Kempton and Bothwell merge to create the Central Hawks while east coast club Triabunna (also from the ODFA) also were included.

=== Six clubs leave the SFL to join the State League and OSFA ===
In 2008 AFL Tasmania announced plans to reintroduce the Tasmanian State League starting in 2009.

Under the plan Clarence, Glenorchy, North Hobart, Hobart and Lauderdale Football Clubs from the Premier League were targeted to join.

After subsequent meetings it was put to a vote of each club's members who accordingly voted affirmatively to leave the SFL and join the State League subject to individual conditions being met. Kingborough Football Club also made a plea to join the TSL but was turned down by AFL Tasmania due to its poor facilities and poor standard home ground at Kingston Beach Oval.

In January 2009, the Channel Football Club was granted permission to join the Old Scholars Football Association. After struggling on and off the ground for several years the Saints feared that they would be no match for former Premier League clubs rejoining the same competition as them, and that the resulting beatings they would've suffered could well have spelled the end of the Channel Football Club's existence so therefore, made a submission to join the more social OSFA competition.

=== Demise of Kermandie ===
Only weeks prior to the start of the 2009 season, Kermandie Football Club announced that it would be going into recess for the immediate future due to a lack of players, and despite a fresh attempt at reviving the club over the summer period of 2009/10, it was revealed that the club was again suffering from a chronic shortage of players and that Kermandie's demise was imminent.

Despite a late attempt to discuss a possible merger with fellow Huon club Cygnet, who at the time were also suffering from player shortages, the Cygnet Football Club expressed their wishes to continue on in their own right and therefore the Kermandie Football Club was set to go out of existence in March 2010 after a history spanning 123-years.

However, a faction within the club led by senior coach Paul Allison (a one time Sydney Swans listed player) had signed up former Sydney Swan and Brisbane Bears forward Warwick Capper, only days later Mark 'Jacko' Jackson was also signed up to try to breathe life into the club, these signings did however create much controversy within the Kermandie/Geeveston region with many supporters feeling that it was turning the club into a circus rather than a serious football club.

SFL President Paul Harriss remained unconvinced and the League had already printed out the season's roster without Kermandie's involvement. A meeting on 17 March 2010 discussed terms on the future of Kermandie Football Club and their involvement with the SFL, with a vote of all club delegates set to decide their fate, however the Kermandie Football Club delegate had already been instructed to advise that the club would not be seeking a return to the SFL in 2010 and as a result, the club was wound up and went out of existence.

=== Triabunna becomes East Coast Bombers ===
In 2011, the Triabunna Football Club became known as the East Coast Bombers in a deal with TSL club Lauderdale which will see them send players from their reserves list (the TSL Reserves competition was axed at the completion of the 2010 season) to play for the former Roos senior team, which had been struggling badly since it entered the SFL in 2006.

=== Central Hawks in recess ===
In 2013 the Central Hawks were forced to go into recess because of a lack of player numbers. The Hawks first entered the SFL in 2006 as a combination of former ODFA clubs Oatlands, Bothwell and Kempton. But Bothwell has re-entered the ODFA for this year in its own right. It will be a ten team competition with a final five format.

=== 2025 Restructure ===
Following the demise of the Tasmanian State League after the 2024 season, the 5 southern TSL clubs (Clarence, Glenorchy, Kingborough, Lauderdale, and North Hobart) re-joined the SFL. They, along with Brighton, formed the Premier League, while the remaining 8 clubs formed the Community League.

== Clubs ==
=== Locations ===
Locations of the SFL clubs. Red = Premier League; yellow = Community League, purple = women's teams only

=== Men ===
==== Premier League ====
Club	Colours	Nickname	Home Ground	Former League	Est.	Years in SFL	SFL Premierships	
Club	Colours	Nickname	Home Ground	Former League	Est.	Years in SFL	Total	Years
Brighton		Robins	Brighton Regional Sports Complex, Pontville	TAFL	1885	1996-2018, 2020-	1	1998
Clarence		Roos	Bellerive Oval, Bellerive	TFL	1884	2001-2008, 2025-	4	2001, 2002 (PL), 2004 (PL), 2006 (PL), 2025 (PL)
Glenorchy		Magpies	KGV Oval, Glenorchy	TFL	1919	2001-2008, 2011, 2025-	2	2007 (PL), 2008 (PL)
Kingborough		Tigers	Kingston Twin Ovals, Kingston	HFA, TFL	1886	1996-2013, 2025-	0	-
Lauderdale		Bombers	Lauderdale Oval, Lauderdale	TAFL, TFL	1979	1996-2008, 2025-	1	2026 (PL)
North Hobart (Hobart Demons 1996-2003)		Demons	North Hobart Oval, North Hobart	TFL	1881	2001-2008, 2025-	1	2003 (PL)

==== Community League ====
Club	Colours	Nickname	Home Ground	Former League	Est.	Years in SFL	SFL Premierships	
Club	Colours	Nickname	Home Ground	Former League	Est.	Years in SFL	Total	Years
Claremont		Magpies	Abbotsfield Park, Claremont	TAFL	1924	1996-	2	2015, 2016
Cygnet		The Port	Cygnet Oval, Cygnet	HFA	1888	1998-	7	2002 (RL), 2003 (RL), 2004 (RL), 2021, 2023, 2024, 2026
Dodges Ferry		Sharks	Dodges Ferry Recreation Ground, Dodges Ferry	TFA	1978	2002-	1	2006 (RL)
Hobart		Tigers	TCA Ground, Queens Domain	TFL	1944	1998-	1	1999
Huonville Lions		Lions	Huonville Recreation Ground, Huonville	–	1998	1998-	3	2008 (RL), 2020, 2025
Lindisfarne		Two Blues	Anzac Park, Lindisfarne	TAFL	1911	1996-	3	2018, 2019, 2022
New Norfolk		Eagles	Boyer Oval, New Norfolk	TFL	1878	2000-	7	2005 (PL), 2009, 2010, 2012, 2013, 2014, 2017
Sorell (East Coast Eagles 1996-1999)		Eagles	Pembroke Park, Sorell	TAFL	1883	1996-2002, 2004-	0	–

=== Women ===
==== Premier League ====
Club	Colours	Nickname	Home Ground	Former League	Est.	Years in SFL	SFL Premierships	
Club	Colours	Nickname	Home Ground	Former League	Est.	Years in SFL	Total	Most recent
Clarence		Roos	Bellerive Oval, Bellerive	TSLW	1884	2021-	0	–
Glenorchy		Magpies	KGV Oval, Glenorchy	TSLW	1919	2021-	1	2021
Kingborough		Tigers	Kingston Twin Ovals, Kingston	TSLW	1886	2021-	1	2025
Lauderdale		Bombers	Lauderdale Oval, Lauderdale	TSLW	1979	2018-	0	–
North Hobart		Demons	North Hobart Oval, North Hobart	TSLW	1881	2017-	4	2022, 2023, 2024, 2026

==== Community League ====
Club	Colours	Nickname	Home Ground	Former League	Est.	Years in SFL	SFL Premierships	
Club	Colours	Nickname	Home Ground	Former League	Est.	Years in SFL	Total	Years
Claremont		Magpies	Abbotsfield Park, Claremont	–	1924	2017-	5	2020, 2023, 2024, 2025, 2026
Cygnet		The Port	Cygnet Oval, Cygnet	–	1888	2017-	1	2022
Dodges Ferry		Sharks	Dodges Ferry Recreation Ground, Dodges Ferry	–	1978	2023-	0	–
Hobart		Tigers	TCA Ground, Queens Domain	–	1944	2026-	0	–
Huonville Lions		Lions	Huonville Recreation Ground, Huonville	–	1998	2021-	0	–
Hutchins		Lions	Queenborough Oval, Sandy Bay	–	1932	2021-	1	2021
Lindisfarne		Two Blues	Anzac Park, Lindisfarne	–	1911	2017-	2	2017, 2018
New Norfolk		Eagles	Boyer Oval, New Norfolk	–	1878	2018-	1	2022
Sorell		Eagles	Pembroke Park, Sorell	–	1883	2025-	0	–
St Virgil's		Saints	New Town Bike Track Oval, New Town	–	1927	2021-	1	2023
Tasmanian University		Rainbows	UTAS Football Oval, Sandy Bay	–	1936	2021-	1	2021

=== U18s only ===
Club	Colours	Nickname	Home Ground	Former League	Est.	Years in SFL	SFL Premierships	
Club	Colours	Nickname	Home Ground	Former League	Est.	Years in SFL	Total	Years
Southern Storm		Storm	Cygnet Oval, Cygnet	–	2012	2026-	0	-

=== Former clubs ===
Club	Colours	Nickname	Home Ground	Former League	Est.	Years in SFL	SFL Premierships		Fate
Club	Colours	Nickname	Home Ground	Former League	Est.	Years in SFL	Total	Years	Fate
Central Hawks		Hawks	Oatlands Oval, Oatlands and Bothwell Recreation Ground, Bothwell	–	2006	2006-2012	0	-	De-merged into Bothwell and Oatlands in Oatlands District FA in 2012
Channel		Saints	Snug Park, Snug	HFA	1967	1996-2008	1	1996	Moved to Old Scholars FA after 2008 season
East Coast Bombers (Triabunna 2006-10)	(2006-10)(2011-15)	Bombers	Triabunna Recreation Ground, Triabunna	ODFA	1900	2006-2015	0	-	Folded after 2015 season, re-formed as Triabunna in Oatlands District FA in 2016
Kermandie	(1998-2000) (2001-03)(2004-08)	Robins	Kermandie Oval, Geeveston	HFA	1887	1998-2008	3	2000, 2005 (RL), 2007 (RL)	Folded after 2008 season
Lachlan	(1996)(1997)	Dockers	Kensington Park, New Norfolk	TAFL	1922	1996-1997	0	-	Folded after 1997 season
South East Suns		Suns	Pembroke Park, Sorell	TWFL		2017-2024	0	–	Replaced by Sorell women's team in 2025
St Virgil's		Saints	New Town Bike Track Oval, New Town	–	1927	2021-2025	1	2023	Women's team only, entered recess in 2026

== Grand Finals ==
=== STFL/SFL Grand Finals (1996–2001; 2009–2024) ===
Year	Winner	Score	Runner-up	Attend.	Venue
1996	Channel	12.15 (87) – 11.4 (70)	Kingston	4,149	Abbotsfield Park
1997	Kingston	10.14 (74) – 8.1 (49)	Claremont	2,174	KGV Oval
1998	Brighton	10.8 (68) – 10.8 (68)	Cygnet	1,875	KGV Oval
1998 (R)	Brighton	14.24 (108) – 5.12 (42)	Cygnet	1,985	KGV Oval
1999	Hobart	20.9 (129) – 11.12 (78)	Brighton	3,096	Huonville Rec. Ground
2000	Kermandie	13.11 (89) – 8.11 (59)	New Norfolk	5,400	North Hobart Oval
2001	Clarence	17.19 (121) – 11.11 (77)	Glenorchy	4,801	North Hobart Oval
2009	New Norfolk	15.11 (101) – 10.9 (69)	Lindisfarne	3,804	North Hobart Oval
2010	New Norfolk	20.18 (138) – 10.6 (66)	Dodges Ferry	5,203	KGV Oval
2011	Kingborough	22.7 (139) – 13.12 (90)	New Norfolk	6,907	KGV Oval
2012	New Norfolk	10.18 (78) – 11.7 (73)	Lindisfarne	4,956	KGV Oval
2013	New Norfolk	15.15 (105) – 9.8 (62)	Claremont	5,337	KGV Oval
2014	New Norfolk	28.9 (177) – 14.10 (94)	Claremont	3,900	KGV Oval
2015	Claremont	16.15 (111) – 6.11 (47)	New Norfolk	4,368	KGV Oval
2016	Claremont	13.13 (91) – 11.17 (83)	Lindisfarne	4,023	North Hobart Oval
2017	New Norfolk	13.14 (92) – 13.9 (87)	Lindisfarne	3,330	North Hobart Oval
2018	Lindisfarne	19.15 (129) – 6.9 (45)	Huonville Lions	4,054	North Hobart Oval
2019	Lindisfarne	17.14 (116) – 7.9 (51)	Huonville Lions	4,126	North Hobart Oval
2020	Huonville Lions	13.7 (85) – 8.9 (57)	Cygnet	1,000	North Hobart Oval
2021	Cygnet	11.10 (76) – 7.16 (58)	Huonville Lions	4,150	North Hobart Oval
2022	Lindisfarne	11.6 (72) – 8.12 (60)	Cygnet	1,850	North Hobart Oval
2023	Cygnet	14.14 (98) – 9.8 (62)	Huonville Lions	3,200	North Hobart Oval
2024	Cygnet	16.9 (105) – 7.9 (51)	Lindisfarne	3,754	North Hobart Oval

=== SFL Premier League Grand Finals: 2002–08, 2025- ===
Year	Winner	Score	Runner-up	Attend.	Venue
2002	Clarence	12.17 (89) – 10.8 (68)	North Hobart	5,560	North Hobart Oval
2003	North Hobart	21.20 (146) – 5.6 (36)	Hobart	4,289	North Hobart Oval
2004	Clarence	17.12 (114) – 12.9 (81)	New Norfolk	6,132	North Hobart Oval
2005	New Norfolk	19.16 (130) – 14.8 (92)	Clarence	5,114	North Hobart Oval
2006	Clarence	17.13 (115) – 11.12 (78)	Glenorchy	7,149	North Hobart Oval
2007	Glenorchy	14.22 (106) – 4.14 (38)	Clarence	7,091	North Hobart Oval
2008	Glenorchy	21.14 (140) – 12.17 (89)	North Hobart	6,224	North Hobart Oval
2025	Clarence	13.10 (88) – 6.13 (49)	Lauderdale		North Hobart Oval
2026	Lauderdale	16.13 (109) - 8.11 (59)	Clarence		North Hobart Oval

=== SFL Regional/Community League Grand Finals: 2002–08 & 2025 ===
Year	Winner	Score	Runner-up	Attend.	Venue
2002	Cygnet	9.13 (67) – 4.7 (31)	Lauderdale	2,460	North Hobart Oval
2003	Cygnet	20.9 (129) – 11.11 (77)	Lauderdale	3,481	North Hobart Oval
2004	Cygnet	21.15 (141) – 9.10 (64)	Sorell	3,501	North Hobart Oval
2005	Kermandie	17.11 (113) – 17.5 (107)	Cygnet	3,800	North Hobart Oval
2006	Dodges Ferry	14.13 (97) – 13.9 (87)	Sorell	3,715	North Hobart Oval
2007	Kermandie	16.13 (109) – 15.9 (99)	Huonville Lions	4,303	North Hobart Oval
2008	Huonville Lions	16.9 (105) – 9.14 (68)	Lindisfarne	4,397	North Hobart Oval
2025	Huonville Lions	10.11 (71) – 8.5 (53)	Cygnet	5,310	North Hobart Oval
2026	Cygnet	10.10 (70) - 9.12 (66)	Hobart	–	North Hobart Oval

=== SFL Women's Premiers ===
==== Premier Division (Division 1 prior to 2025) ====
Year	Winner	Score	Runner-up	Venue
2017	Lindisfarne	4.8 (32) – 3.4 (22)	South East Suns	North Hobart Oval
2018	Lindisfarne	9.13 (67) – 2.2 (14)	North Hobart	North Hobart Oval
2019	Brighton	12.10 (82) – 3.1 (19)	Lindisfarne	North Hobart Oval
2020	Claremont	8.6 (48) – 1.5 (11)	Huonville Lions	North Hobart Oval
2021	Glenorchy	10.8 (68) – 5.2 (32)	Claremont	North Hobart Oval
2022	North Hobart	8.7 (55) – 3.4 (22)	Clarence	North Hobart Oval
2023	North Hobart	5.3 (33) – 3.5 (23)	Kingborough	North Hobart Oval
2024	North Hobart	5.5 (35) – 4.7 (31)	Kingborough	North Hobart Oval
2025	Kingborough	8.8 (56) - 3.8 (26)	Clarence	North Hobart Oval
2026	North Hobart	8.12 (60) - 5.4 (34)	Clarence	North Hobart Oval

==== Community League (Division 2 prior to 2025) ====
Year	Winner	Score	Runner-up	Venue
2021	University	8.1 (49) – 5.7 (37)	Cygnet	North Hobart Oval
2022	Cygnet	5.2 (32) – 3.2 (20)	Lauderdale	North Hobart Oval
2023	Claremont	5.4 (34) – 3.5 (23)	Lauderdale	North Hobart Oval
2024	Claremont	5.5 (35) – 4.7 (31)	Hutchins	North Hobart Oval
2025	Claremont	5.7 (37) – 2.2 (14)	Hutchins	North Hobart Oval
2026	Claremont	3.2 (20) - 2.7 (19)	Hutchins	North Hobart Oval

==== Division 3 ====
Year	Winner	Score	Runner-up	Venue
2021	Hutchins	12.10 (82) – 0.0 (0)	St Virgils	North Hobart Oval
2022	New Norfolk	8.9 (57) – 3.4 (22)	St Virgils	North Hobart Oval
2023	St Virgils	7.8 (50) – 1.3 (9)	Dodges Ferry	North Hobart Oval
No competition since 2023 season

== Goalkicking ==
=== STFL/SFL Leading Goalkickers: 1996–2001 & 2009–present ===
● 1996 – Brad Howarth (Channel) – 123
● 1997 – Darren Kaye (Lindisfarne) – 101
● 1998 – Michael Darcy (Cygnet) – 119
● 1999 – Dale Hall (Hobart) – 98
● 2000 – Michael McGregor (Kermandie) – 114
● 2001 – Robbie Devine (North Hobart) – 109
● 2009 – Adrian Burdon (New Norfolk) – 106
● 2010 – Clint Curtain (Claremont) – 87
● 2011 – Tim Lamprill (Kingborough) – 105
● 2012 – Michael Thompson (New Norfolk) – 101
● 2013 – Ben Halton (Cygnet) – 88
● 2014 – Josh Hall (New Norfolk) – 112
● 2015 – Sean Salter (Claremont) – 101
● 2016 – Sean Salter (Claremont) – 90
● 2017 – Michael Cassidy (Lindisfarne) – 72
● 2018 – Michael Cassidy (Lindisfarne) – 77
● 2019 – Marcus Parker (New Norfolk) – 85
● 2020 – Josh Fox (Cygnet) – 61
● 2021 – Cambell Hooker (Dodges Ferry) – 81
● 2022 – Josh Green (Lindisfarne) – 97
● 2023 – Josh Green (Lindisfarne) – 86
● 2024 – Ed Stanley (Lindisfarne) – 104

=== SFL Premier League Leading Goalkickers: 2002–2008 ===
● 2002 – Robbie Devine (North Hobart) – 65
● 2003 – Matthew Smith (New Norfolk) – 67
● 2004 – Sean Salter (Glenorchy) – 71
● 2005 – Sean Salter (New Norfolk) – 76
● 2006 – Michael Darcy (Kingborough) – 94
● 2007 – Mitchell Williamson (Clarence) – 58
● 2008 – Robbie Devine (North Hobart) – 82
● 2025 – Josh Green (Clarence) & Sam Siggins (Lauderdale) – 74

● 2025 – Josh Green (Clarence) – 74

=== SFL Regional/Community League Leading Goalkickers: 2002–2008 & 2025 ===
● 2002 – Daniel Walter (Cygnet) – 88
● 2003 – Michael Darcy (Cygnet) – 122
● 2004 – Michael Darcy (Cygnet) – 117
● 2005 – Michael Darcy (Cygnet) – 108
● 2006 – Sam Bowering (Sorell) – 86
● 2007 – Michael Darcy (Cygnet) – 103
● 2008 – Chris Joyce (Huonville Lions) – 136
● 2025 – Ed Stanley (Lindisfarne) – 88
● 2026 – Jeremiah Perkins (Sorell) – 77

== Medal Winners ==
=== Horrie Gorringe Medal Winners ===
(Best Player in the SFL Premier League Grand Final 2002-2008)
● 2002 – Nick Davey (Clarence)
● 2003 – Robbie Devine (North Hobart)
● 2004 – Tim Geappen (Clarence)
● 2005 – Michael Thompson (New Norfolk)
● 2006 – Jeremy Sharpen (Clarence)
● 2007 – Brad Curran (Glenorchy)
● 2008 – Damian McIver (Glenorchy)

=== Tony Martyn Medal Winners ===
(Best Player in the SFL Regional League Grand Final 2002-2008)
● 2002 – Gordon Shaw (Cygnet)
● 2003 – Heath Dillon (Cygnet)
● 2004 – Grant Clark (Cygnet)
● 2005 – David Reynolds (Kermandie)
● 2006 – Jamie Curran (Dodges Ferry)
● 2007 – Anthony Baker (Kermandie)
● 2008 – Darren Garth (Huonville Lions)

=== Gorringe-Martyn Medal Winners ===
(Best Player in SFL Grand Final 2009–present; Amalgamation of previous Gorringe and Martyn Medals)
● 2009 – Sam Hall (New Norfolk)
● 2010 – Matthew Smith (New Norfolk)
● 2011 – Grant King (Kingborough)
● 2012 – Brad Carver (New Norfolk)
● 2013 – Nathan Ross (New Norfolk)
● 2014 – Nathan Ross (New Norfolk)
● 2015 – Nathan Matthews (Claremont)
● 2016 – Braden Barwick (Claremont)
● 2017 – Jason Laycock (New Norfolk)
● 2018 – Michael Cassidy (Lindisfarne)
● 2019 – Brad Tennick (Lindisfarne)
● 2020 – Rhys Ward (Huonville Lions)
● 2021 – Thor Boscott (Cygnet)
● 2022 – Matthew Phillips (Lindisfarne)
● 2023 – Thor Boscott (Cygnet)
● 2024 – Luke Ashlin (Cygnet)
● 2025 – Jack Preshaw (Hunoville Lions)
● 2026 – Nathan Duggan (Cygnet)

=== Hodgman Medal Winners – STFL/SFL/SFL Regional League ===
● 1996 – Jason Gulliver (Claremont)
● 1997 – Tim Blanden (Lindisfarne)
● 1998 – Andrew Beveridge (Channel)
● 1999 – Jason Philp (Huonville Lions)
● 2000 – Brendan Browning (Brighton)
● 2001 – Damien Dillon (Cygnet) - Awarded a William Leitch Medal (Retrospective)
● 2002 – Brad Marsland (Lauderdale)
● 2003 – Danny Noonan (Dodges Ferry)
● 2004 – Jeremy Brereton (Cygnet)
● 2005 – Craig McLeod (Dodges Ferry) & Michael Gowans (Channel)
● 2006 – Nick Doyle (Huonville Lions)
● 2007 – Andrew Nash (Kermandie)
● 2008 – Jamie Curran (Dodges Ferry)

=== Horrie Gorringe Medal Winners – SFL Premier League ===
● 2002 – Matthew Jones (New Norfolk) - Awarded a William Leitch Medal (Retrospective)
● 2003 – Brendon Bolton (North Hobart) - Awarded a William Leitch Medal (Retrospective)

=== William Leitch Medal Winners – SFL Premier League (2004–2008 & 2025) & SFL (2009–2024) ===
● 2004 – Brock Ackerley (New Norfolk) & Roger Belcher (New Norfolk)
● 2005 – David Newett (Glenorchy)
● 2006 – Jesse Crouch (Glenorchy)
● 2007 – Brad Carver (New Norfolk)
● 2008 – Shane Piuselli (Glenorchy)
● 2009 – Roger Belcher (New Norfolk)
● 2010 – James Lange (Huonville Lions)
● 2011 – Nathan Ross (New Norfolk)
● 2012 – Michael Thompson (New Norfolk)
● 2013 – Nathan Ross (New Norfolk)
● 2014 – Caden Wilson (New Norfolk)
● 2015 – Nathan Brown (Claremont)
● 2016 – Troy Cunliffe (Lindisfarne)
● 2017 – Troy Cunliffe (Lindisfarne)
● 2018 – Jarrod Lawler (Huonville Lions)
● 2019 – Mitchell Walker (Claremont)
● 2020 – Ethan Brock (Huonville Lions)
● 2021 – Thor Boscott (Cygnet)
● 2022 – Joshua Green (Lindisfarne)
● 2023 – Darcy Gardner (Brighton) & Sheldon Smith (Lindisfarne)
● 2024 – Sheldon Smith (Lindisfarne)
● 2025 – Josh Green (Clarence) & Sam Siggins (Lauderdale)

== SFL Records ==
=== SFL Record Highest Scores ===
● 396 – Channel 60.36 (396) d Lachlan 1.0 (6) – Snug Park (29 July 1996)
● 362 – Huonville Lions 57.20 (362) d Triabunna 0.3 (3) – Huonville (24 July 2010)
● 349 – Huonville Lions 54.25 (349) d Claremont 0.0 (0) – Huonville (13 April 2024)
● 341 – Huonville Lions 52.29 (341) d Claremont 0.0 (0) – Huonville (31 July 2021)
● 329 – Cygnet 52.17 (329) d Claremont 0.0 (0) – Abbotsfield Park (29 May 2021)
● 311 – Channel 48.23 (311) d Sorell 4.5 (29) – Snug Park (15 June 1996)
● 311 – Huonville Lions 47.29 (311) d Triabunna 4.4 (28) – Huonville (30 June 2007)
● 303 – Cygnet 46.27 (303) d Claremont 0.0 (0) – Cygnet (14 August 2021)
● 293 – Cygnet 43.35 (293) d Claremont 2.2 (14) – Snug Park (6 July 2024)
● 293 – Brighton 45.23 (293) d Sorell 4.3 (27) – Pontville (29 March 1996)
● 291 – Cygnet 44.27 (291) d Claremont 2.1 (13) – Abbotsfield Park (27 April 2024)
● 289 – Brighton 43.31 (289) d Claremont 1.0 (6) – Pontville (7 August 2021)
● 279 – Brighton 43.21 (279) d Claremont 0.2 (2) – Pontville (27 July 2024)
● 278 – Cygnet 41.32 (278) d Claremont 1.0 (6) – Cygnet (5 April 2025)
● 277 – Lindisfarne 42.25 (277) d Channel 2.7 (19) – Anzac Park (12 July 2008)
● 276 – Claremont 43.18 (276) d Huonville Lions 2.1 (13) – Abbotsfield Park (2 August 2014)
● 276 – New Norfolk 40.36 (276) d Triabunna 4.5 (29) – Triabunna (5 June 2010)

=== SFL Record Lowest Scores ===
● 0 - Claremont 0.0 (0) v Huonville Lions 54.25 (349) – Huonville (13 April 2024)
● 0 – Claremont 0.0 (0) v Cygnet 46.27 (303) – Cygnet (14 August 2021)
● 0 – Claremont 0.0 (0) v Cygnet 52.17 (329) – Abbotsfield Park (29 May 2021)
● 0 – Claremont 0.0 (0) v Huonville Lions 52.29 (341) – Huonville (31 July 2021)
● 1 – Hobart 0.1 (1) v Cygnet 35.20 (230) – Cygnet (1 June 2024)
● 1 – Claremont 0.1 (1) v New Norfolk 39.27 (261) – Boyer Oval (2 April 2021)
● 1 – Claremont 0.1 (1) v Cygnet 40.19 (259) – Kermandie Oval (5 August 2023)
● 2 – Claremont 0.2 (2) v Brighton 43.21 (279) – Pontville (27 July 2024)
● 2 – Hobart 0.2 (2) v Sorell 25.23 (173) – Pembroke Park (13 July 2024)
● 2 – Claremont 0.2 (2) v Sorell 23.25 (163) – Pembroke Park (15 June 2024)
● 2 – Claremont 0.2 (2) v Sorell 24.30 (174) – Abbotsfield Park (3 July 2021)
● 3 – Hobart 0.3 (3) v Sorell 29.21 (195) – TCA Ground (4 May 2024)
● 3 – Brighton 0.3 (3) v North Hobart 19.22 (136) – Pontville (19 June 2004)
● 3 – Triabunna 0.3 (3) v Huonville Lions 57.20 (362) – Huonville (24 July 2010)
● 3 – Claremont 0.3 (3) v Huonville Lions 34.36 (240) – Abbotsfield Park (24 April 2021)
● 4 – Sorell 0.4 (4) v Cygnet 17.22 (124) - Pembroke Park (26 June 2021)

=== SFL Record Highest Margin ===
● 390 – Channel 60.36 (396) d Lachlan 1.0 (6) – Snug Park (29 July 1996)
● 359 – Huonville Lions 57.20 (362) d Triabunna 0.3 (3) – Huonville (24 July 2010)
● 349 – Huonville Lions 54.25 (349) d Claremont 0.0 (0) – Huonville (13 April 2024)
● 341 – Huonville Lions 52.29 (341) d Claremont 0.0 (0) – Huonville (31 July 2021)
● 329 – Cygnet 52.17 (329) d Claremont 0.0 (0) – Abbotsfield Park (29 May 2021)
● 303 – Cygnet 46.27 (303) d Claremont 0.0 (0) – Cygnet (14 August 2021)
● 283 – Brighton 43.31 (289) d Claremont 1.0 (6) – Pontville (7 August 2021)
● 283 – Huonville Lions 47.29 (311) d Triabunna 4.4 (28) – Huonville (30 June 2007)
● 282 – Channel 48.23 (311) d Sorell 4.5 (29) – Snug Park (15 June 1996)
● 279 – Cygnet 43.35 (293) d Claremont 2.2 (14) – Snug Park (6 July 2024)
● 278 – Cygnet 44.27 (291) d Claremont 2.1 (13) – Abbotsfield Park (27 April 2024)
● 277 – Brighton 43.21 (279) d Claremont 0.2 (2) – Pontville (27 July 2024)
● 272 – Cygnet 41.32 (278) d Claremont 1.0 (6) – Cygnet (5 April 2025)
● 266 – Brighton 45.23 (293) d Sorell 4.3 (27) – Pontville (29 March 1996)
● 263 – Claremont 43.18 (276) d Huonville Lions 2.1 (13) – Abbotsfield Park (2 August 2014)
● 260 – New Norfolk 39.27 (261) d Claremont 0.1 (1) – Boyer Oval (2 April 2021)
● 258 – Lindisfarne 42.25 (277) d Channel 2.7 (19) – Anzac Park (12 July 2008)
● 258 – Cygnet 40.19 (259) d Claremont 0.1 (1) – Kermandie Oval (5 August 2023)

=== SFL Record Highest Match Aggregate ===
● 402 – Channel 60.36 (396) d Lachlan 1.0 (6) – Snug Park (29 July 1996)
● 365 – Huonville Lions 57.20 (362) d Triabunna 0.3 (3) – Huonville (24 July 2010)
● 349 – Huonville Lions 54.25 (349) d Claremont 0.0 (0) – Huonville (13 April 2024)
● 341 – Huonville Lions 52.29 (341) d Claremont 0.0 (0) – Huonville (31 July 2021)
● 340 – Channel 48.23 (311) d Sorell 4.5 (29) – Snug Park (15 June 1996)
● 339 – Huonville Lions 47.29 (311) d Triabunna 4.4 (28) – Huonville (30 June 2007)
● 330 – New Norfolk 33.21 (219) d Lindisfarne 17.9 (111) – Anzac Park (10 April 2010)
● 329 – Cygnet 52.17 (329) d Claremont 0.0 (0) – Abbotsfield Park (29 May 2021)
● 326 – Lindisfarne 39.9 (243) d Channel 13.5 (83) – Anzac Park (14 April 2007)
● 320 – Brighton 45.23 (293) d Sorell 4.3 (27) – Pontville (29 March 1996)
● 317 – Cygnet 43.35 (293) d Claremont 2.2 (14) – Snug Park (6 July 2024)
● 316 – Kermandie 42.18 (270) d Triabunna 7.4 (46) – Kermandie (16 June 2007)
● 308 – New Norfolk 32.25 (217) d Kingborough 14.7 (91) – Kingston Beach Oval (18 April 2009)
● 305 – New Norfolk 40.25 (265) d Brighton 6.4 (40) – Boyer Oval (25 April 2009)
● 305 – New Norfolk 40.36 (276) d Triabunna 4.5 (29) – Triabunna (5 June 2010)
● 304 – Cygnet 44.27 (291) d Claremont 2.1 (13) – Abbotsfield Park (27 April 2024)
● 303 – Cygnet 46.27 (303) d Claremont 0.0 (0) – Cygnet (14 August 2021)

=== SFL Record – Most Behinds (Match) ===
● 36 – Channel 60.36 (396) d Lachlan 1.0 (6) – Snug Park (29 July 1996)
● 36 – New Norfolk 40.36 (276) d Triabunna 4.5 (29) – Triabunna (24 July 2010)
● 36 – Huonville Lions 34.36 (240) d Claremont 0.3 (3) – Abbotsfield Park (24 April 2021)
● 35 – Cygnet 43.35 (293) d Claremont 2.2 (14) – Snug Park (6 July 2024)
● 35 – Brighton 23.35 (173) d Lindisfarne 6.3 (39) – Pontville (4 July 1998)
● 35 – Dodges Ferry 23.35 (173) d Triabunna 4.4 (28) – Port Arthur (19 June 2010)
● 33 – Claremont 14.33 (117) d Triabunna 4.7 (31) – Triabunna (12 April 2008)
● 33 – Lindisfarne 38.33 (261) d Channel 3.6 (24) – Snug Park (3 May 2008)
● 32 - Cygnet 41.32 (278) d Claremont 1.0 (6) - Cygnet (5 April 2025)
● 32 – Claremont 35.32 (242) d Huonville Lions 5.3 (33) – Huonville (14 June 2014)
● 32 – Kingborough 36.32 (248) d Triabunna 5.4 (34) – Kingston Beach Oval (10 April 2010)
● 31 – Brighton 43.31 (289) d Claremont 1.0 (6) – Pontville (7 August 2021)
● 31 – Hobart 21.31 (157) d Lindisfarne 6.7 (43) – TCA Ground (9 May 1998)
● 31 – Lauderdale 14.31 (115) d Lindisfarne 10.6 (66) – Anzac Park (3 April 1999)
● 31 – Huonville Lions 33.31 (229) d Triabunna 3.6 (24) – Triabunna (1 May 2010)
● 31 – Dodges Ferry 8.31 (79) dw Brighton 12.7 (79) – Shark Park (26 May 2012)

=== SFL Record – Highest Score (Quarter) ===
● 117 – Channel 18.9 (117) v Lachlan (4th Qtr) – Snug Park (29 July 1996)
● 105 – Channel 16.9 (105) v Lachlan (3rd Qtr) – Snug Park (29 July 1996)
● 100 – Channel 15.10 (100) v Lachlan (1st Qtr) – Snug Park (29 July 1996)
● 98 – Huonville Lions 16.2 (98) v Triabunna (3rd Qtr) – Huonville (24 July 2010)
● 96 – Huonville Lions 15.6 (96) v Claremont (3rd Qtr) – Huonville (13 April 2024)
● 96 – Cygnet 15.6 (96) v Claremont (3rd Qtr) – Cygnet (14 August 2021)
● 96 – Kingston 15.6 (96) v Lachlan (1st Qtr) – Kingston Beach (6 July 1996)
● 96 – New Norfolk 15.6 (96) v Sorell (4th Qtr) – Boyer Oval (9 June 2012)
● 96 – Huonville Lions 15.6 (96) v Triabunna (4th Qtr) – Huonville (24 July 2010)
● 94 – Cygnet 15.4 (94) v Claremont (3rd Qtr) – Abbotsfield Park (27 April 2024)
● 94 – Cygnet 15.4 (94) v Claremont (4th Qtr) – Abbotsfield Park (29 May 2021)
● 93 – Lindisfarne 15.3 (93) v Claremont (1st Qtr) – Abbotsfield Park (17 August 2024)
● 93 – Huonville Lions 15.3 (93) v Claremont (4th Qtr) – Huonville (13 April 2024)
● 92 – Huonville Lions 14.8 (92) v Claremont (2nd Qtr) – Huonville (31 July 2021)
● 91 – Cygnet 14.7 (91) v Claremont (4th Qtr) – Snug Park (6 July 2024)
● 91 – Huonville Lions 14.7 (91) v Claremont (4th Qtr) – Huonville (31 July 2021)

=== SFL Record Most Goals Kicked In A Match (Individual) ===
● 18 – Brad Howarth (Channel) v Sorell – Snug Park (15 June 1996)
● 18 – Brendan Fevola (New Norfolk) v Huonville Lions – Boyer Oval (16 June 2012)
● 18 – Ed Stanley (Lindisfarne) v Claremont – Anzac Park (17 August 2024)
● 17 – Josh Green (Lindisfarne) v Claremont – Anzac Park (1 July 2023)
● 16 – Michael Paul (Huonville Lions) v Claremont – Abbotsfield Park (22 June 2024)
● 16 – Michael Cassidy (Lindisfarne) v Claremont – Abbotsfield Park (17 July 2021)
● 16 – Brendan Fevola (New Norfolk) v Brighton – Boyer Oval (29 June 2013)
● 15 – Byron Howard Jr (Brighton) v Lindisfarne – Anzac Park (17 April 1999)
● 15 – Michael McGregor (Kermandie) v Lindisfarne – Kermandie (3 June 2000)
● 15 – Robbie Devine (North Hobart) v Lindisfarne – Anzac Park (11 August 2001)
● 15 – Michael Darcy (Cygnet) v Channel – Cygnet (2 June 2007)
● 14 – Brock Daniels (Hobart) v Claremont – TCA Ground (26 June 2021)
● 14 – Marcus Parker (New Norfolk) v Sorell – Pembroke Park (6 July 2019)
● 14 – Chris Joyce (Huonville Lions) v Triabunna – Huonville (30 June 2007)

● 13 - Ethan Brock (Huonville Lions) v Claremont - Huonville (13 April 2024)

● 13 – Joe Direen (Cygnet) v Hobart – Cygnet (1 June 2024)
● 13 - Joe Direen (Cygnet) v Claremont - Cygnet (5 April 2025)

=== SFL Record All-Time Leading Goalkicker (Individual) ===
● 983 – Michael Darcy (Cygnet & Kingborough) – 1998–2017

== Ladders ==
=== 2010 ===
Southern FL	Wins	Byes	Losses	Draws	For	Against	%	Pts
New Norfolk	17	0	1	0	2730	1208	225.99%	68
Dodges Ferry	17	0	1	0	2506	1130	221.77%	68
Huonville	13	0	5	0	2135	1267	168.51%	52
Kingborough	12	0	6	0	2089	1529	136.63%	48
Central Hawks	11	0	7	0	1957	1527	128.16%	44
Lindisfarne	8	0	10	0	1602	1830	87.54%	32
Cygnet	6	0	12	0	1441	1726	83.49%	24
Claremont	6	0	12	0	1709	2048	83.45%	24
Brighton	5	0	13	0	1588	1776	89.41%	20
Sorell	3	0	15	0	1249	2024	61.71%	12
Triabunna	0	0	18	0	687	3628	18.94%	0

Finals

Final	Team	G	B	Pts	Team	G	B	Pts
Elimination	Huonville	19	17	131	Lindisfarne	6	3	39
Elimination	Kingborough	16	23	119	Central Hawks	12	12	84
1st Semi	Huonville	7	7	49	Kingborough	5	7	37
2nd Semi	New Norfolk	8	12	60	Dodges Ferry	6	8	44
Preliminary	Dodges Ferry	15	13	103	Huonville	8	8	56
Grand	New Norfolk	20	18	138	Dodges Ferry	10	6	66

=== 2011 ===
Southern FL	Wins	Byes	Losses	Draws	For	Against	%	Pts
New Norfolk	20	0	0	0	2916	992	293.95%	80
Kingborough	16	0	4	0	2434	1168	208.39%	64
Dodges Ferry	15	0	5	0	2248	1296	173.46%	60
Huonville	14	0	6	0	1956	1338	146.19%	56
Lindisfarne	14	0	6	0	1948	1460	133.42%	56
Brighton	11	0	8	1	1853	1469	126.14%	46
Glenorchy	8	0	11	1	1669	2008	83.12%	34
Claremont	7	0	13	0	1634	1925	84.88%	28
Cygnet	6	0	14	0	1341	2298	58.36%	24
Sorell	4	0	16	0	1115	2527	44.12%	16
Central Hawks	2	0	18	0	1313	2525	52.00%	8
East Coast	2	0	18	0	1305	2726	47.87%	8

Finals

Final	Team	G	B	Pts	Team	G	B	Pts
Elimination	Dodges Ferry	22	15	147	Brighton	4	10	34
Elimination	Huonville	13	15	93	Lindisfarne	6	13	49
1st Semi	Huonville	18	17	125	Dodges Ferry	16	12	108
2nd Semi	New Norfolk	17	16	118	Kingborough	15	6	96
Preliminary	Kingborough	16	21	117	Huonville	6	9	45
Grand	Kingborough	22	7	139	New Norfolk	13	12	90

=== 2012 ===
Southern FL	Wins	Byes	Losses	Draws	For	Against	%	Pts
New Norfolk	15	0	1	0	2341	845	277.04%	60
Lindisfarne	15	0	1	0	1743	905	192.60%	60
Kingborough	11	0	5	0	1764	1019	173.11%	44
Dodges Ferry	9	0	6	1	1475	1163	126.83%	38
Claremont	9	0	7	0	1213	1434	84.59%	36
Brighton	7	0	8	1	1343	1371	97.96%	30
Cygnet	7	0	8	1	1258	1489	84.49%	30
Huonville	6	0	9	1	1274	1566	81.35%	26
East Coast	4	0	12	0	1159	1759	65.89%	16
Sorell	3	0	13	0	994	1717	57.89%	12
Central Hawks	0	0	16	0	837	2133	39.24%	0

Finals

Final	Team	G	B	Pts	Team	G	B	Pts
Elimination	Dodges Ferry	18	12	120	Claremont	9	18	72
Elimination	Kingborough	25	11	161	Brighton	14	4	88
1st Semi	Kingborough	17	14	116	Dodges Ferry	6	10	46
2nd Semi	Lindisfarne	11	10	76	New Norfolk	7	13	55
Preliminary	New Norfolk	13	17	95	Kingborough	3	9	27
Grand	New Norfolk	10	18	78	Lindisfarne	11	7	73

=== 2013 ===
Southern FL	Wins	Byes	Losses	Draws	For	Against	%	Pts
New Norfolk	17	0	1	0	2496	1087	229.62%	68
Claremont	15	0	3	0	1949	1303	149.58%	60
Kingborough	14	0	4	0	1917	1337	143.38%	56
Lindisfarne	9	0	9	0	1527	1422	107.38%	36
Huonville Lions	9	0	9	0	1575	1592	98.93%	36
East Coast Bombers	9	0	9	0	1499	1616	92.76%	36
Cygnet	9	0	9	0	1673	1905	87.82%	36
Dodges Ferry	5	0	13	0	1406	1867	75.31%	20
Sorell	2	0	16	0	1026	2186	46.94%	8
Brighton	1	0	17	0	1156	1909	60.56%	4

Finals

Final	Team	G	B	Pts	Team	G	B	Pts
Elimination	Lindisfarne	17	16	118	Huonville	7	8	50
Qualifying	Claremont	12	13	85	Kingborough	9	5	59
1st Semi	Kingborough	11	14	80	Lindisfarne	8	8	56
2nd Semi	New Norfolk	17	14	116	Claremont	13	8	86
Preliminary	Claremont	10	7	67	Kingborough	7	11	53
Grand	New Norfolk	15	15	105	Claremont	9	8	62

=== 2014 ===
Southern FL	Wins	Byes	Losses	Draws	For	Against	%	Pts
New Norfolk	17	0	1	0	3038	788	385.53%	68
Claremont	15	0	3	0	2677	967	276.84%	68
Lindisfarne	12	0	6	0	1893	1292	146.52%	48
East Coast Bombers	12	0	6	0	1833	1403	130.65%	48
Dodges Ferry	12	0	6	0	1513	1488	101.68%	48
Brighton	8	0	10	0	1503	1571	95.67%	32
Sorell	4	0	14	0	1195	1858	64.32%	16
Hobart	4	0	14	0	1149	2441	47.07%	16
Huonville Lions	3	0	15	0	945	2420	39.05%	12
Cygnet	1	0	17	0	953	2471	38.57%	4

Finals

Final	Team	G	B	Pts	Team	G	B	Pts
Elimination	Dodges Ferry	9	9	63	East Coast Bombers	7	11	53
Qualifying	Lindisfarne	14	10	94	Claremont	11	11	77
1st Semi	Claremont	15	22	112	Dodges Ferry	4	12	36
2nd Semi	New Norfolk	21	16	142	Lindisfarne	7	3	45
Preliminary	Claremont	11	10	76	Lindisfarne	11	7	73
Grand	New Norfolk	28	9	177	Claremont	14	10	94

== See also ==
- Tasmanian Football League
- Northern Tasmanian Football League
