= Claremont Football Club (Tasmania) =

Claremont

Names
- Full name: Claremont Football Club
- Nickname(s): Magpies, The Mont
- Club song: "We're a bunch of jolly good chaps and each one is a star."

2025 season
- Home-and-away season: 8th from 8
- Leading goalkicker: Jye Graham (15)
- Best and fairest: Logan Meredith

Club details
- Founded: 1924; 101 years ago
- Colours
- Competition: Southern Football League
- Owners: Members
- President: Dennis Bird
- Coach: Nathan Senior
- Ground(s): Abbotsfield Park

Uniforms
Home	Away

The Claremont Football Club, nicknamed the Magpies, is an Australian rules football club currently playing in the Southern Football League in Tasmania, Australia.

The club has worn a traditional Collingwood-style playing uniform since 1949 (it originally wore Green & Yellow) and is based in Hobart's northern suburbs, 14 km from the Hobart CBD.
Founded in 1924, Claremont participated in a number of local leagues but is best known for being one Tasmania's most successful amateur football clubs since joining the TAFL Southern Division in 1949, having won a total of seventeen (17) Southern Amateur premiership titles along with ten (10) Condor Shield state amateur premiership titles between 1965–1995.

Following the collapse of the Tasmanian Amateur Football League at the completion of the 1995 season, Claremont became one of the foundation members of the new STFL in 1996 and made the finals in its first season.

In 1997, Claremont made it through to its first STFL Grand Final but suffered a 25-point loss to Kingston, however the Magpies would dwindle away into an unaccustomed wilderness for almost two decades before flying high once again to make four consecutive grand finals between 2013–2016, the latter two years (2015-2016) bringing premiership joy to Claremont for the first time in twenty years and was even more noteworthy by virtue of the fact that Claremont was able to win back-to-back hat-tricks of premiership titles with the club's Colts, Reserves and Seniors all taking out SFL premierships in 2015 and 2016.
In 2017 the Claremont Football Club entered a team in the inaugural season of the Southern Football League Women's Competition and has done in each season since.
Claremont Football Club is based at Abbotsfield Park where it has hosted its home matches since 1971, previous to that it played at the St Anne's Cricket Club ground (Cadbury's Oval) from 1949-1970 and the Claremont Soccer Ground from 1924–1948.

Entry to Southern Football League
● 1996

Entry to Southern Football League Women's
● 2017

STFL/Regional League/SFL Premierships
● 2015, 2016

STFL/Regional League/SFL Runner Up
● 1997, 2013, 2014

TAFL Southern Division Premierships
● 1965, 1968, 1974, 1975, 1976, 1978, 1979, 1980, 1981, 1984, 1986, 1987, 1988, 1992, 1993, 1994, 1995

TAFL Southern Division Runner Up
● 1950, 1951, 1983, 1985, 1989, 1990, 1991

State Amateur Premierships (Condor Shield)
● 1968, 1974, 1978, 1979, 1981, 1984, 1986, 1987, 1992, 1993

Peter Hodgman Medal winners
(Best & Fairest Player - STFL)

- 1996 – Jason Gulliver

Johnston Medal winners
(Reserves Best & Fairest Player - STFL)

- 1996 – Darris Fahey

William Leitch Medal winners
(Best & Fairest Player - SFL)

- 2015 – Nathan Brown
- 2019 – Mitch Walker

Walter Howard Medal winners
(Best & Fairest Player – TAFL Southern Division)
● 1948 – K. Brassington
● 1959 – J. Leask & E. Mitchell (tied)
● 1960 – E. Mitchell
● 1966 – N. Hanley
● 1980 – M. Mason
● 1984 – J. Moles
● 1985 – M. Mason
● 1992 – J. Salter

Gorringe-Martyn Medal winners
(Best & Fairest Player – SFL Grand Final)
● 2015 – Nathan Matthews
● 2016 – Braden Barwick

SFL Leading Goalkickers
● 2010 – Clinton Curtain (87)
● 2015 – Sean Salter (101)
● 2016 – Sean Salter (90)

Club Record Games-Holder
● Craig Bennett – 400 (still active)

Club Record Attendance
● 5,337 vs New Norfolk – 2013 SFL Grand Final at KGV Football Park

Club Record Score
● Not Recorded.
