= Huonville Football Club =

Australian rules football club in Tasmania

Huonville Lions

Names
- Full name: Huonville Lions Football Club
- Former name(s): Huonville Bulldogs; Franklin Lions
- Nickname: Lions
- Former nickname: Bulldogs
- Club song: "We are the pride of the Huon"

2026 season
- After finals: 4th
- Home-and-away season: 4th
- Leading goalkicker: Daniel Golding (40)
- Best and fairest: Jack Preshaw

Club details
- Founded: 1998; 28 years ago
- Colours
- Competition: Southern Football League
- President: Todd Cordwell
- Coach: Edward Burrows-Cheng
- Captain: Jack Preshaw
- Premierships: SFL (3): 2008; 2020; 2025
- Ground: Huonville Oval (capacity: 17,125)
- Former ground: Franklin Oval

Uniforms
Home	Away

The Huonville Lions Football Club, nicknamed The Lions, is an Australian rules football club currently playing in the Southern Football League in Huonville, Tasmania, Australia.

== History ==
The Huonville Lions Football Club was formed as a result of a merger between former Huon Football Association clubs Huonville Bulldogs (1887–1997) and the Franklin Lions (1887–1997) at the end of the 1997 season after the Huon Football Association's demise. The Lions then joined the Southern Football League in 1998.

After a solid crack in 2019, finishing runners up to Lindisfarne, Huonville salvaged their grand final woes with a win over Cygnet in the 2020 SFL Grand Final.

The Huonville Lions FC have elite Junior footy facilities, in 2026, their minor U14's squad made it to the semi finals for the first time since 2014. At the end of the Home and Away season they finished 5th ( Top 8 finals ) out of 11 teams at 83 points winning 7 of their 12 games. In their debut to the finals series the came out victorious with Captain Mason Cordwell and Vice Captain Claye Lorkin leading them to a 91 - 12 victory against Brighton. In the Semi Finals their finals run ended sadly with a 67 - 7 loss against Kinborough.

Kicking all the goals for the side was full forward Charlie Tolman (20), Gun Devils small forward Jye Wilcox (18), Devils Player Dempsey Fahey (14) and Captain Mason Cordwell and Elite level wing Milo Barnett with 11 a piece. Best player leaderboard Mason Cordwell (12), Claye Lorkin (10) and one of the best ruckman's in the competition Ira Radford (8). Captain Mason Cordwell was also given the Runner up Beakley Award in 2026.

== Honours ==
=== Club ===
Southern Football League

- Senior Premierships (3): 2008, 2020, 2025
- Runners Up (5): 2007, 2018, 2019, 2021, 2023
- Huonville FC – Huon FA Premierships (6): 1904, 1933, 1953, 1973, 1989, 1992
- Franklin FC – Huon FA Premierships (10): 1903, 1907, 1932, 1958, 1959, 1963, 1982, 1985, 1987, 1997
- Franklin FC – Tasmanian Country Football Champions (1): 1958
- Club record score: Huonville Lions 57.20 (362) v. Triabunna 0.3 (3) on 24 July 2010 at Huonville Recreation Ground
- Peter Hodgeman Medal winners
  - Nick Doyle (2006)
- William Leitch Medal winners
  - James Lange (2010)
  - Jarrod Lawler (2018)
  - Ethan Brock (2020)

== Gorringe-Martyn Medalist - Best on Ground In Grand Final ==
- Darren Garth (2008)
- Rhys Ward (2020)
- Jack Preshaw (2025)

- Club games record holder
  - 450+ - Steven "Runner" Reeve
