= Brighton Football Club (Tasmania) =

Brighton

Names
- Full name: Brighton Football Club
- Former name: Mangalore Football Club
- Nickname: Robins
- Club song: "It's A Grand Old Flag!"

2025 season
- Home-and-away season: 6th from 6
- Leading goalkicker: Max Lamb (25)
- Best and fairest: (N/A)

Club details
- Founded: 1885; 141 years ago
- Colours
- Competition: SFL Premier League
- President: Darren Clarke
- Coach: Paul Kennedy
- Captain: Samuel Lewis-Johnson
- Premierships: SFL (1): 1998; South Eastern District FA (12): 1954; 1955; 1956; 1957; 1959; 1965; 1968; 1970; 1971; 1972; 1977; 1979; TAFL Southern Division (1): 1985
- Ground: Pontville Oval

Uniforms
Home	Away	Alternate

The Brighton Football Club, nicknamed the Robins, is an Australian rules football club currently playing in the SFL Premier League in Tasmania, Australia.

== Origins ==
The club began as Mangalore Football Club in 1885 and participated in various country and suburban leagues throughout southern Tasmania up until it was accepted to join the Southern Amateurs (TAFL Southern Division) in 1981.

Mangalore continued to participate in the Southern Amateurs, winning the one premiership title (in 1985 when they also took out the State Amateur title) until the competition collapsed following the completion of the 1995 season whereby a replacement competition, the STFL (now known as the SFL) was formed and from the 1996 season they were one of eight founding clubs of the competition, continuing participation to the present day.
In 1996 the club changed its name from Mangalore to Brighton Football Club but kept its same Robins nickname and red and blue playing colours.

Note that in the 1940s and early 1950s there was a club named Brighton (no relation, and wore Hawks colours) that fielded a team in the Southern Districts Football Association while Mangalore (the current Brighton) won the South-Eastern Districts premierships in 1954 and 1955.
Success has proved elusive for the Robins since their early days in the Southern Football League, losing semi-finalists in 1996 and 1997 before winning their first and so far only premiership title in 1998.

Brighton's last grand final appearance was in 1999 under playing coach Byron Howard when they were defeated by former TFL club, Hobart by 51-points at Huonville Recreation Ground on 11 September 1999.
Brighton have competed in various competitions including:
● Brighton FA: 1922–1931
● Richmond FA: 1933–1934
● South Eastern District FA: 1952–1979
● Tasman FA: 1980
● Tasmanian Amateur FL (Southern Division): 1981–1995

Entry to Southern Football League
● 1996

SEDFA Premierships
● 1954, 1955, 1956, 1957, 1959, 1965, 1968, 1970, 1971, 1972, 1977, 1979

TAFL Southern Division Premierships
● 1985

State Amateur Premierships
● 1985

SFL/SFL Premier League Premierships
● 1998

SFL/SFL Premier League Runners-Up
● 1999

William Leitch Medalists:
● 2023 – Darcy Gardner

Peter Hodgman Medalists
● 2000 – Brendon Browning

Club Record Games Holder
● 270 – Leigh Gray

Club Record Attendance
● 3,896 v Hobart on 11 September 1999 – SFL Grand Final at Huonville Recreation Ground

Club Record Score
● Unknown
