= Dodges Ferry Football Club =

Dodges Ferry

Names
- Full name: Dodges Ferry Football Club
- Nickname(s): Sharks
- Club song: "When the Sharks Go Marching In"

2024 season
- After finals: 7th
- Home-and-away season: 7th
- Leading goalkicker: Brad Joseph (54)

Club details
- Founded: 1978; 47 years ago
- Colours
- Competition: Southern Football League
- President: David Bellars
- Coach: Jess Tegg
- Captain(s): Jono Bullock
- Premierships: SFL (1): 2006; Tasman FA (6): 1979; 1980; 1984; 1989; 1990; 1991
- Ground(s): Dodges Ferry Recreation Ground

Uniforms
Home	Away

The Dodges Ferry Football Club, nicknamed The Sharks, is an Australian rules football club based in the Hobart suburb of Dodges Ferry. The club currently plays in the Southern Football League (SFL) in Tasmania, Australia. The club wears a red, yellow and black jumper and has the mascot the Sharks. The club spent its first 23 years in the Tasman Football Association (TFA) where it won half a dozen premierships. The league folded after the 2001 season. The Sharks then entered the SFL in 2002. Dodges won their first SFL premiership in 2006 and were runners up in 2010.

== Home grounds, club achievements and records ==
- Shark Park – 1993–present
- Founded – 1978
- Colours – Red, yellow and blue
- Emblem – Sharks
- Club record games holder:
  - Paul "Wally" Cusick – 469 games
- Southern Football League premierships
  - 2006
- Southern Football League runners-up
  - 2010
- Southern Football League leading goalkickers
  - 2021 - Campbell Hooker - 81
- Tasman Football Association premierships
  - 1979, 1980, 1984, 1989, 1990, 1991
- Tasman Football Association leading goalkickers
  - 1980 - Eddie Gotowski - 54
  - 1983 - Gary Pears - 83
  - 1994 - Bruce Rainbird - 104
- Club record score
  - 449 - Dodges Ferry 68.41.449 (v Railway 3.0.18) - Tasman FA - 1993
- Club record quarter
  - Unknown
