= Paul Daffey =

Australian sports journalist

Paul Daffey is an Australian sports journalist. In 2001, Daffey wrote Local Rites: A year in Grass Roots Football in Victoria and Beyond. In 2013, Daffey and John Harms co-edited Footy Town – Stories of Australia's Game, a book about regional Australian football clubs and culture. He is based in Melbourne.
