= Lindisfarne Football Club =

Lindisfarne

Names
- Full name: Lindisfarne Football Club
- Nickname: The Two Blues
- Club song: We Are The Blue and Blues We are the Lindisfarne Blue & Blues Were the team that never lets you down Were the only team from Lindisfarne With all the champions, they like send us, to keep our ends up And they'll know that they've been playing Against the famous old Two Blues

2026 season
- After finals: 5th
- Home-and-away season: 5th
- Leading goalkicker: Senior Men - Ed Stanley (50) Reserve Men - Nathan Cranfield (37) Senior Women - Natalie Pearce (12)
- Best and fairest: Sheldon Smith

Club details
- Founded: 1911
- Colours
- Competition: Southern Football League
- President: Martin Trinder
- Coach: Senior Men - Teege Westbury Reserve Men - Jarrod Fisher Senior Women - Nathan Cranfield
- Captain: Senior Men - Aidan Webster Reserve Men - Jacob Heffernan Senior Women - Sophie Reynolds
- Premierships: Seniors - 2018, 2019, 2022 Reserves - 2017, 2018, 2026 Colts - 2018, 2019, 2022 Womens - 2017, 2018
- Ground: (capacity: 2,000)
- Training ground: Anzac Park

Uniforms
Home	Away

Other information
- Official website: https://lindisfarnefootballclub.tidyhq.com/

The Lindisfarne Football Club, nicknamed the Two Blues, is an Australian rules football club currently playing in the Southern Football League in Tasmania, Australia.

== Origins ==
The Lindisfarne Football Club was formed in 1911 and competed in the Clarence Football Association until 1925 where they won one premiership title in 1924.
In 1926 the club joined Tasmanian Football Association until 1948 In 1949 the club joined the Tasmanian Amateur Football League - Southern Division (Southern Amateurs) winning three premiership titles in 1957, 1982 and its most recent premiership title in 1989 until the League went out of existence at the end of the 1995 season.
In 1996 they joined the newly formed Southern Tasmanian Football League now known as the SFL where it still competes today.
After a solid start to its SFL tenure, the Two Blues suffered from a disastrous period between 1998 and 2004 whereby the club lost an SFL record 50-consecutive senior matches.
In 2008, Lindisfarne enjoyed a much needed reverse in fortunes by going through the season sweeping all before them, undefeated, only to go down to Huonville Lions by 37-points in the Grand Final.
This loss heralded an era of frustration and heartbreak for the Two-Blues who went on to perform strongly over the next decade only to suffer similar defeats in Grand Finals, their three most recent losses in Grand Finals (2012, 2016 and 2017) realised losses of 5,8 and 5 points, marking five Grand Final defeats in ten years. Finally in 2018, Lindisfarne won the premiership by avenging their upset 2008 loss against Huonville.

Entry to Southern Football League
1996

STFL/Regional League/SFL Premierships
2018, 2019, 2022

STFL/Regional League/SFL Runner Up
2008, 2009, 2012, 2016, 2017, 2024

TAFL Southern Division Premierships
1957, 1982, 1989

TAFL Southern Division Runners Up
1992

State Amateur Premierships (Condor Shield)
1957, 1989

Clarence Football Association Premierships
1924

TANFL/TFL Statewide League/TSFL Premierships

- Nil

Peter Hodgman Medal winners
1997 – Tim Blanden

William Leitch Medal winners
2016 – Troy Cunliffe
2017 – Troy Cunliffe
2022 – Josh Green
2023 – Sheldon Smith
2024 – Sheldon Smith

STFL/Regional League/SFL Leading Goalkickers
1997 – Darren Kaye (101)
2006 – Jamie Tubb (77)
2017 – Michael Cassidy (72)
2022 – Josh Green (97)
2024 – Ed Stanley (106)
2025 – Ed Stanley (86)

Club Record Games-Holder
408 by Andrew Clarke

Club Record Attendance
4,956 vs New Norfolk – 2012 SFL Grand Final at KGV Oval

Club Record Score
Not Recorded
