= Triabunna Football Club =

Triabunna Roos

Names
- Full name: Triabunna Football Club
- Former name(s): East Coast Bombers
- Nickname(s): Kangaroos
- Former nickname(s): Bombers

2023 season
- After finals: 1st
- Home-and-away season: 1st
- Leading goalkicker: Caden Wilson (36)

Club details
- Founded: 1900; 125 years ago
- Competition: Oatlands District Football Association
- President: Vivian Gray
- Coach: Ryan Sweet
- Captain(s): Jarrod Kaye
- Premierships: ODFA (2): 2002; 2023
- Ground(s): Triabunna Recreation Ground (capacity; 3,000)

Uniforms
Home	Away

The Triabunna Football Club, nicknamed the Roos, is an Australian rules football club playing in the Oatlands District Football Association (ODFA) in Tasmania, Australia.

After the East Coast Bombers folded at the end of the 2015 season in the Southern Football League, the Triabunna Football Club decided to go back to the original maroon and white colours they had worn for many years beforehand. The Roos re-joined the ODFA in 2016.
