= List of Australian rules football clubs in Tasmania =

This is a list of clubs playing Australian rules football in Tasmania at the senior level. Guide to abbreviations:

- FC = Football Club
- AFC = Australian Football Club (mainly used if in Queensland or NSW or outside Australia) / Amateur Football Club (mainly used in the other Australian States)
- ARFC = Australian Rules Football Club

== National level ==
=== Australian Football League ===
Club	Colours	Nickname	Home Ground	Former league	Est.	Years in AFL	AFL Premierships	
Club	Colours	Nickname	Home Ground	Former league	Est.	Years in AFL	Total	Years
Tasmania		Devils	Macquarie Point Stadium, Battery Point	–	2023	2028-	0	-

== State level ==
=== Victorian Football League ===
Club	Colours	Nickname	Home Ground	Former league	Est.	Years in VFL	VFL Premierships	
Club	Colours	Nickname	Home Ground	Former league	Est.	Years in VFL	Total	Years
Tasmania (R)		Devils	North Hobart Oval, North Hobart	–	2023	2026-	0	-

== Local level ==
=== Circular Head Football Association ===
Club	Colours	Nickname	Home Ground	Former league	Est.	Years in CHFA	CHFA Premierships	
Club	Colours	Nickname	Home Ground	Former league	Est.	Years in CHFA	Total	Years
Forest-Stanley		Demons	Stanley Recreation Ground, Stanley	–	1963	1963-	19	1965, 1972, 1973, 1979, 1980, 1981, 1984, 1985, 1986, 1991, 1999, 2001, 2002, 2005, 2010, 2015, 2016, 2017, 2025
Irishtown		Canaries	Irishtown Sports Complex, Irishtown	–	1896	1900-1915, 1919-	41	1906, 1907, 1908, 1909, 1910, 1911, 1912, 1913, 1914, 1915, 1919, 1920, 1921, 1922, 1923, 1924, 1926, 1927, 1928, 1930, 1932, 1935, 1937, 1938, 1940, 1944, 1953, 1957, 1969, 1970, 1974, 1975, 1976, 1982, 1983, 1995, 1996, 2008, 2009, 2011, 2018
Redpa		Redlegs	Redpa Oval, Redpa	–	1964	1965-	16	1972, 1978, 1979, 1989, 1990, 1992, 1994, 2000, 2006, 2012, 2013, 2014, 2019, 2022, 2023, 2024
Scotchtown (Scotchtown-Marrawah 1959-75)		Tigers	Circular Head Recreation Ground, Smithton	–	1950	1951-1956, 1959-	5	1977, 1987, 1988, 2004, 2021

=== Darwin Football Association ===
Club	Colours	Nickname	Home Ground	Former League	Est.	Years in DFA	DFA Premierships	
Club	Colours	Nickname	Home Ground	Former League	Est.	Years in DFA	Total	Premierships
Cuprona		Bulldogs	Heybridge Recreation Ground, Heybridge	RFA	1912	1965-	2	1977, 2000
Queenstown		Crows	Queenstown Oval, Queenstown	–	1994	1994-	4	1997, 2014, 2021, 2024
Ridgley		Saints	Ridgley Recreation Ground, Ridgley	RFA	1891	1952-	12	1955, 1956, 1964, 1965, 1966, 1969, 1970, 1971, 1989, 2007, 2008, 2009
Somerset (Cam 1959-72)		Kangaroos	Langley Park, Somerset	–	1959	1959-	7	1960, 1961, 1963, 1972, 1982, 2010, 2019
South Burnie (APPM 1951-55)		Hawks	Wivenhoe Recreation Ground, Wivenhoe	NWFU, NWFL	1941	1951-1996, 1999-	16	1954, 1959, 1962, 1967, 1968, 1994, 1995, 2004, 2012, 2013, 2015, 2016, 2017, 2018, 2023, 2025
Yeoman		Robins	Wivenhoe Recreation Ground, Wivenhoe	NWFU	1890s	1951-	5	1951, 1952, 1978, 1993, 1998
Yolla (Tewkesbury 1951-52)		Demons	Yolla Recreation Ground, Yolla	RFA	1935	1951-	13	1979, 1980, 1981, 1983, 1984, 1986, 1987, 1988, 1991, 1992, 2005, 2006, 2022

=== King Island Football Association ===
Club	Colours	Nickname	Home Ground	Est.	Years in KIFA	KIFA Premierships	
Club	Colours	Nickname	Home Ground	Est.	Years in KIFA	Total	Years
Currie		Robins	Currie Football Ground, Currie	1904	1904-	44	1907, 1908, 1910, 1912, 1919, 1920, 1921, 1923, 1924, 1926, 1929, 1931, 1933, 1934, 1935, 1937, 1939, 1948, 1954, 1960, 1962, 1963, 1964, 1967, 1968, 1972, 1975, 1977, 1979, 1981, 1982, 1986, 1988, 1989, 1990, 1992, 1995, 1996, 2010, 2011, 2016, 2018, 2024, 2025
Grassy		Hawks	Grassy Football Oval, Grassy	1919	1919; 1939-	17	1946, 1947, 1949, 1953, 1955, 1957, 1958, 1978, 1998, 2005, 2006, 2009, 2012, 2014, 2015, 2021, 2022, 2023
North		Bulldogs	Currie Football Ground, Currie	1904	1904-	47 (Australian record)	1906, 1913, 1914, 1915, 1922, 1925, 1927, 1928, 1930, 1932, 1938, 1940, 1945, 1950, 1951, 1952, 1956, 1959, 1961, 1965, 1966, 1969, 1970, 1971, 1973, 1974, 1976, 1980, 1983, 1984, 1985, 1987, 1991, 1993, 1994, 1997, 1999, 2000, 2001, 2002, 2003, 2004, 2007, 2008, 2013, 2017, 2019

=== Northern Tasmanian Football Association ===
Club	Colours	Nickname	Home Ground	Former League	Est.	Years in NTFA	NTFA Premierships	
Club	Colours	Nickname	Home Ground	Former League	Est.	Years in NTFA	Total	Years
Bracknell		Redlegs	Bracknell Recreation Ground, Bracknell	EDFA	1920s	1998-	1	2021
Bridgenorth		Parrots	Bridgenorth Recreation Ground, Bridgenorth	TAFL	1923	1996-	2	1996, 2010
Bridport		Seagulls	Bridport Oval, Bridport	NEFU	1934	2017-2021, 2023	0	-
Campbell Town		Robins	Campbell Town Recreation Ground, Campbell Town	EDFA, ODFA	1886	1998-2006, 2025-	3	Div 2: 1998, 2000, 2001
Deloraine		Kangaroos	Deloraine Recreation Ground, Deloraine	NWFL	1894	2004-	1	2020
East Coast Swans		Swans	St Helens Recreation Reserve, St Helens and Pyengana Recreation Reserve, Pyengana	NEFU	1910	2017-	2	2018, 2025
Evandale		Eagles	Morven Park, Evandale	EDFA	1892	1998-	0	-
George Town		Saints	George Town Sports Complex, George Town	TAFL	1927	1996-	8	2002, 2003, 2004, 2005, 2006, 2007, 2008, 2009
Hillwood		Sharks	Hillwood Recreation Reserve, Hillwood	TAFL	1927	1996-	3	1999, 2000, 2019
Launceston		Blues	Windsor Park, Riverside	TSL	1875	2025-	0	-
Lilydale		Demons	Lilydale Recreation Ground, Lilydale	NEFU	1921	2011-	4	2012, 2017, 2019, 2021
Longford		Tigers	Longford Recreation Ground, Longford	TAFL	1878	1996-	1	2022
Meander Valley		Suns	Westbury Recreation Ground, Westbury	LFA	2012	2014-	0	-
North Launceston		Bombers	York Park, Invermay	TSL	1893	2025-	1	2025
Old Launcestonians		Blues	Invermay Park, Invermay	TAFL	1931	1996-	1	1997
Old Scotch Collegians		Thistles	NTCA Ground, Launceston	TAFL	1935	1996-	8	2009, 2010, 2013, 2014, 2015, 2016, 2023, 2024
Perth		Magpies	Perth Sports Grounds, Perth	EDFA	1880	1998-	0	-
Rocherlea		Tigers, Rockapes	Rocherlea Football Oval, Rocherlea	TAFL	1951	1996-	6	2011, 2012, 2013, 2016, 2023, 2025
Scottsdale		Magpies	Scottsdale Recreation Ground, Scottsdale	NWFL	1889	2000-	1	2001
South Launceston		Bulldogs	Youngtown Memorial Oval, Youngtown	TSL	1986	2014-	5	2014, 2015, 2017, 2018, 2024
St Patrick's Old Collegians		Saints	John Cunningham Memorial Oval, Prospect	TAFL	1931	1996-	5	1996, 1999, 2002, 2004, 2022
University of Tasmania (Uni-Mowbray 1996-2019)		Lions	University Oval, Newnham	TAFL	1923	Div 1: 1996-2003; Div 2: 2004-	5	Div 1: 1997, 1998; Div 2: 2005, 2006, 2011

=== North West Football League ===
Club	Colours	Nickname	Home Ground	Former League	Est.	Years in NWFL	NWFL Premierships	
Club	Colours	Nickname	Home Ground	Former League	Est.	Years in NWFL	Total	Years
Burnie		Dockers	West Park Oval, Burnie	TSL	1995	2001-2008, 2015-2016, 2018-	8	2001, 2002, 2003, 2004, 2005, 2018, 2019, 2020
Circular Head		Saints	Circular Head Recreation Ground, Smithton	NWFU	1907	1987-2018, 2022-	1	1991
Devonport		Magpies	Devonport Oval, Devonport	TSL	1881	2001-2008, 2015-	5	2021, 2022, 2023, 2024, 2025
East Devonport		Swans	Girdlestone Park, East Devonport	NWFU	1901	1987-2020, 2025-	1	1988
Latrobe		Demons	Darrel Baldock Oval, Latrobe	NWFU	1881	1987-	4	2010, 2011, 2013, 2016
Penguin		Two Blues	Dial Park, Penguin	NWFU	1890	1987-	0	-
Ulverstone		Robins	Ulverstone Recreation Ground, Ulverstone	NWFU	1888	1987-	10	1987, 1990, 1993, 1994, 1995, 1996, 1997, 2000, 2009, 2017
Wynyard		Cats	Wynyard Football Ground, Wynyard	NWFU	1885	1987-	3	2012, 2014, 2015

=== North Western Football Association ===
Club	Colours	Nickname	Home Ground	Former League	Est.	Years in NWFA	NWFA Premierships	
Club	Colours	Nickname	Home Ground	Former League	Est.	Years in NWFA	Total	Years
East Ulverstone		Crows	Haywoods Reserve, Ulverstone	–	2000	2000-	2	2002, 2025
Forth		Magpies	Forth Recreation Ground, Forth	NWFU, LFA	1904	1905, 1907-1923, 1927, 1929, 1931-1932, 1934-1940, 1946-1953, ?-present day	21	1922, 1935, 1937, 1938, 1939, 1940, 1948, 1950, 1956, 1957, 1958, 1965, 1972, 1974, 1980, 2005, 2007, 2015, 2016, 2018, 2022
Motton Preston		Demons	Preston Recreation Ground, Preston	LFA	1967	1976-	10	1985, 1986, 2004, 2006, 2010, 2012, 2013, 2020, 2021, 2023
Rosebery-Toorak		Hawks	Rosebery Park Oval, Rosebery	WTFA	1987	1990-	2	1998, 1999
Sheffield		Robins	Sheffield Football Ground, Sheffield	KFA	c.1910	1939, 1956-	8	1964, 1973, 1987, 1988, 1994, 2000, 2003, 2024
Spreyton		Eagles	Maidstone Park, Spreyton	–	1921	1921-1925, 1945-	9	1954, 1975, 1976, 1977, 1978, 1984, 1990, 2001, 2011
Turners Beach		Seagulls	Turners Beach Football Ground, Turners Beach	LFA	1971	1976-	5	1981, 1982, 1983, 1994, 2014
Wesley Vale		Roos	Pipers Park, Wesley Vale	NWFU	1903	1903-1906, 1908-1940, 1946-1949, 1951-	21	1910, 1921, 1925, 1926, 1929, 1930, 1931, 1934, 1936, 1949, 1959, 1960, 1963, 1979, 1989, 1996, 1997, 2008, 2009, 2017, 2019

=== Oatlands District Football Association ===
Club	Jumper	Nickname	Home Ground	Former League	Est.	Years in ODFA	ODFA Premierships	
Club	Jumper	Nickname	Home Ground	Former League	Est.	Years in ODFA	Total	Years
Bothwell		Rabbits	Bothwell Recreation Reserve, Bothwell	STFA	1880	1987-2005; 2013-	9	1989, 1997, 2005, 2016, 2017, 2018, 2022, 2024, 2025
Campania		Wallabies	Campania Recreation Reserve, Campania	SEDFA	1882	2007-	0	-
Mt Pleasant		Mounties	Pawtella Oval, Pawtella	MFA	1920	1953-	19	1953, 1954, 1955, 1964, 1971, 1972, 1973, 1974, 1977, 1979, 1980, 1987, 2003, 2006, 2011, 2013, 2014, 2019, 2021
Oatlands		Tigers	Oatlands Oval, Oatlands	SEDFA	1879	1978-2005, 2014-2019, 2022-	6	1978, 1981, 1983, 1984, 1988, 2015
Triabunna		Roos	Triabunna Recreation Ground, Triabunna	TFA	1900	2001-2005, 2016-	2	2002, 2023
Woodsdale		Lions	Wallaby Park, Woodsdale	PT	1902	1952-2002, 2003-2015, 2022-	22	1956, 1957, 1959, 1960, 1963, 1964, 1967, 1986, 1990, 1991, 1992, 1993, 1995, 1996, 1998, 1999, 2000, 2001, 2008, 2009, 2010, 2012

=== Old Scholars Football Association ===
Club	Colours	Nickname	Home Ground	Former League	Est.	Years in OSFA	OSFA Premierships	
Club	Colours	Nickname	Home Ground	Former League	Est.	Years in OSFA	Total	Years
Dominic Old Scholars Association (DOSA)		Roosters	TCA Ground, Queens Domain	TAFL	1976	1987-	8	1987, 1994, 1995, 1999, 2013, 2018, 2019, 2025
Hutchins' Old Boys		Lions	Queenborough Oval, Sandy Bay	TAFL	1932	1987-	9	2000, 2003, 2004, 2006, 2007, 2010, 2012, 2014, 2022
Old Hobartians Association (OHA)		Ships	Geilston Bay Oval, Geilston Bay	TAFL	1919	1987-	6	1988, 2008, 2011, 2020, 2021, 2024
Richmond		Blues	Richmond War Memorial Oval, Richmond	TFA	1878	2001-	5	2004, 2005, 2009, 2015, 2017
St Virgil's Old Boys		Saints	New Town Bike Track Oval, New Town	TAFL	1927	1987-	4	1996, 1998, 2001, 2023
Tasmanian University		Rainbows	UTAS Football Oval, Sandy Bay	TAFL	1936	1987-	3	1992, 1993, 2016

=== Southern Football League ===
Club	Colours	Nickname	Home Ground	Former League	Est.	Years in SFL	SFL Premierships	
Club	Colours	Nickname	Home Ground	Former League	Est.	Years in SFL	Total	Years
Brighton		Robins	Brighton Regional Sports Complex, Pontville	TAFL	1885	1996-2018, 2020-	1	1998
Claremont		Magpies	Abbotsfield Park, Claremont	TAFL	1924	1996-	2	2015, 2016
Clarence		Roos	Bellerive Oval, Bellerive	TFL	1884	2001-2008, 2025-	4	2001, 2002 (PL), 2004 (PL), 2006 (PL), 2025 (PL)
Cygnet		The Port	Cygnet Oval, Cygnet	HFA	1888	1998-	6	2002 (RL), 2003 (RL), 2004 (RL), 2021, 2023, 2024
Dodges Ferry		Sharks	Dodges Ferry Recreation Ground, Dodges Ferry	TFA	1978	2002-	1	2006 (RL)
Glenorchy		Magpies	KGV Oval, Glenorchy	TFL	1919	2001-2008, 2011, 2025-	2	2007 (PL), 2008 (PL)
Hobart		Tigers	TCA Ground, Queens Domain	TFL	1944	1998-	1	1999
Huonville Lions		Lions	Huonville Recreation Ground, Huonville	–	1998	1998-	3	2008 (RL), 2020, 2025
Hutchins' women		Lions	Queenborough Oval, Sandy Bay	–	1932	2021-	1	2021
Kingborough		Tigers	Kingston Twin Ovals, Kingston	HFA, TFL	1886	1996-2013, 2025-	0	-
Lauderdale		Bombers	Lauderdale Oval, Lauderdale	TAFL, TFL	1979	1996-2008, 2025-	0	-
Lindisfarne		Two Blues	Anzac Park, Lindisfarne	TAFL	1911	1996-	3	2018, 2019, 2022
New Norfolk		Eagles	Boyer Oval, New Norfolk	TFL	1878	2000-	7	2005 (PL), 2009, 2010, 2012, 2013, 2014, 2017
North Hobart (Hobart Demons 1996-2003)		Demons	North Hobart Oval, North Hobart	TFL	1881	2001-2008, 2025-	1	2003 (PL)
Sorell		Eagles	Pembroke Park, Sorell	TAFL	1883	1996-2002, 2004-	0	–
St Virgil's women		Saints	New Town Bike Track Oval, New Town	–	1927	2021-	1	2023
Tasmanian University women		Rainbows	UTAS Football Oval, Sandy Bay	–	1936	2021-	1	2021
