= Tasmanian Amateur Football League =

Australian rules football league

The Tasmanian Amateur Football League was a body which controlled amateur football in the state of Tasmania, Australia.

== Structure ==
Two competitions were run by the TAFL - the Launceston-based Northern Division and the Hobart-based Southern Division. These competitions ran separate home-and-away premiership seasons, with the premiers of each competition playing off for the Conder Shield at the close of each season. The TAFL operated on amateur sporting principles, which forbade payments of any kind to players or officials.

== Northern Division ==
Tasmanian Amateur Football League - Northern Division
- Most recent season or competition: 1995
- Sport: Australian rules football
- Founded: 1931
- First season: 1931
- Folded: 1995
- No. of teams: 11 (1995), 27 (historical)
- Country: Australia
- Last champion: University-Mowbray (1995)
- Most titles: University-Mowbray (14)
- Related competitions: NTFA

=== History ===
The Northern Division began as the Launceston Amateur Football League in 1931, with Associated Banks, Old Launcestonians and Old Patricians making up the inaugural roster of clubs. The LAFL grew steadily during the pre-war years, with Churinga and Dark Blue Rovers joining in 1933, Old Scotch Collegians in 1935 and Technical School Old Boys in 1938. Banks folded after the 1934 season. Churinga won 4 premierships in a row between 1937 and 1940 and went through the entire 1939 and 1940 seasons without losing a match. The LAFL went into recess in 1942 as clubs struggled with numbers due to WWII enlistments.

The competition was re-formed in 1946 as the Tasmanian Amateur Football League. This season saw the introduction of district clubs for the first time, with Mowbray and Waverley joining. Dark Blue Rovers did not re-form after the war. Mowbray dominated the early postwar seasons, winning premierships in 1946, 1947, 1949 and 1950. The 1949 premiership was marred by controversy. Rumors emerged in November that Mowbray had paid their coach for that season, Terry Cowley. This went against the Amateur code followed by the TAFL, which strictly forbade any payments to players or coaches. At a Tribunal meeting on the 12th of December, Mowbray were found guilty of paying Cowley, which put them at risk of being stripped of their 1949 State and Northern Division premierships. This decision was overturned following a re-hearing on 1 February 1950, which found that the December 12th meeting was unconsitutional because no delegate from Waverley was present.

The 1950s were a tumultuous decade for the Northern Division. Technical School Old Boys folded after the 1951 season. The competition was left with only four clubs in 1953 when Old Scotch entered recess and Mowbray departed for the Northern Tasmanian District Football League before the season. Old Scotch would return in 1954 but the competition's future was placed in jeopardy when Churinga withdrew from the competition in June and Waverley forfeited its last two games, leaving only 3 active clubs to complete the season. Waverley would later rule out a return to the competition as it believed it received a "poor deal" from the competition due to not being an Old Boys' club, as the other 4 clubs were. Churinga would re-form in 1955, allowing the Northern Division to continue as a 4 club competition.

The competition stabilized during the 1960s with the additions of Quandeine and Brooks Old Boys. The dissolution of the NTDFL after the 1963 season saw Deloraine and Kings Meadows join briefly. Mowbray also rejoined the TAFL from the NTDFL and would become the dominant club of the next decade, winning 5 premierships in a row between 1965-1969 and another three in a row between 1972-1974. Rocherlea entered the competition from the East Tamar Football Association in 1970 after that competition merged with the West Tamar FA.

The Northern Division experienced a period of rapid growth during the 1980s. Churinga folded in 1979, followed by Quandeine and Brooks both after the 1982 season, however this was offset in 1985 when 5 clubs from the recently-defunct Tamar Football Association joined the TAFL, along with the newly-formed Northern Districts club. Longford and George Town both joined from the NTFL in 1988 and 1991 respectively. The dissolution of the Tasmanian Amateur Football League after the 1995 season saw the Northern Division clubs form the Northern Tasmanian Football Association in 1996.

=== Clubs ===
==== Final ====
| Club | Colours | Nickname | Home Ground | Former League | Est. | Years in TAFL | TAFL Senior Premierships | | Fate |
| Club | Colours | Nickname | Home Ground | Former League | Est. | Years in TAFL | Total | Years | Fate |
|---|---|---|---|---|---|---|---|---|---|
| Bridgenorth | | Parrots | Bridgenorth Recreation Ground, Bridgenorth | TFA | 1923 | 1985-1995 | 0 | - | Formed NTFA in 1996 |
| George Town | | Saints | George Town Sports Complex, George Town | NTFL | 1927 | 1991-1995 | 0 | - | Formed NTFA in 1996 |
| Hillwood | | Sharks | Hillwood Recreation Reserve, Hillwood | TFA | 1927 | 1985-1995 | 2 | 1990, 1992 | Formed NTFA in 1996 |
| Longford | | Tigers | Longford Recreation Ground, Longford | NTFL | 1878 | 1988-1995 | 1 | 1989 | Formed NTFA in 1996 |
| Northern Districts | (1985-90)(1991-95) | Crows | York Park, Invermay | – | 1985 | 1985-1995 | 1 | 1987 | Formed NTFA in 1996 |
| Old Launcestonians | (1960s)(?-1995) | Blues | Invermay Park, Invermay | – | 1931 | 1931-1995 | 11 | 1951, 1953, 1953, 1958, 1959, 1960, 1962, 1964, 1970, 1971, 1982 | Formed NTFA in 1996 |
| Old Scotch Collegians | | Thistles | NTCA Ground, Launceston | – | 1935 | 1935-1952, 1954-1995 | 7 | 1957, 1975, 1976, 1978, 1980, 1983, 1986 | Formed NTFA in 1996 |
| Rocherlea | | Tigers, Rockapes | Rocherlea Football Oval, Rocherlea | ETFA | 1951 | 1970-1995 | 4 | 1981, 1985, 1988, 1991 | Formed NTFA in 1996 |
| St Patrick's Old Collegians | | Saints | John Cunningham Memorial Oval, Prospect | – | 1931 | 1931-1939, 1941-1995 | 9 | 1931, 1932, 1935, 1936, 1948, 1954, 1955, 1956, 1984 | Formed NTFA in 1996 |
| Tamar Cats | | Cats | Beauty Point Recreation Ground, Beauty Point and Beaconsfield Football Ground, Beaconsfield | – | 1989 | 1989-1995 | 1 | 1993 | Formed NTFA in 1996 |
| University-Mowbray (Mowbray 1946-92) | | Eagles | University Oval, Newnham | NTDFL | 1923 | 1946-1952, 1964-1995 | 14 | 1946, 1947, 1949, 1950, 1965, 1966, 1967, 1968, 1969, 1972, 1973, 1974, 1994, 1995 | Played in NTDFL between 1953-63. Formed NTFA in 1996 |

==== Former ====
| Club | Colours | Nickname | Home Ground | Former League | Est. | Years in TAFL | TAFL Senior Premierships | | Fate |
| Club | Colours | Nickname | Home Ground | Former League | Est. | Years in TAFL | Total | Years | Fate |
|---|---|---|---|---|---|---|---|---|---|
| Associated Banks | | | Invermay Park, Invermay | – | 1930 | 1931-1934 | 1 | 1933 | Folded after 1934 season |
| Beaconsfield | | Swans | Beaconsfield Football Ground, Beaconsfield | TFA | 1900 | 1985-1988 | 0 | - | Merged with Beauty Point to form Tamar Cats after 1988 season |
| Beauty Point | | Tigers | Beauty Point Recreation Ground, Beauty Point | TFA | 1948 | 1985-1988 | 0 | - | Merged with Beaconsfield to form Tamar Cats after 1988 season |
| Brooks Old Boys | | | Birdwood Oval, Brooks High School, Rocherlea | – | 1960 | 1960-1982 | 2 | 1961, 1963 | Folded after 1982 season |
| Churinga | | | Invermay Park, Invermay | – | 1931 | 1933-1979 | 5 | 1934, 1937, 1938, 1939, 1940 | Folded after 1979 season |
| Colleges | | | | – | | | 0 | - | Folded at unknown date |
| Dark Blue Rovers | | Blues, Rovers | Invermay Park, Invermay | – | | 1933-1939, 1941 | 1 | 1941 | Recess in 1940. Did not re-form after WWII |
| Deloraine | | Magpies | Deloraine Recreation Ground, Deloraine | NTDFL | 1894 | 1964-1967 | 0 | - | Moved to Esk FA in 1968 |
| Devonport High School | | | | | | 1967-1968 | 0 | - | Left league |
| Eastern Suburbs (Ravenswood 1980s-85) | | Kangaroos | Lilydale Oval, Lilydale | – | 1980s | 1980s-1986 | 0 | - | Folded after 1986 season |
| Exeter | | Magpies | Exeter Showgrounds, Exeter | TFA | 1910 | 1985-1991 | 0 | - | Folded after 1991 season |
| Kings Meadows | | | Kings Meadows High School Oval, Kings Meadows | NTDFL | 1951 | 1964-1967 | 0 | - | Folded after 1967 season |
| Matriculation College | | | | – | | | 0 | - | Folded at unknown date |
| Quandeine | | Qs | Windsor Park, Riverside | – | 1964 | 1964-1982 | 2 | 1977, 1979 | Folded after 1982 season |
| Technical School Old Boys | | | Invermay Park, Invermay | – | 1938 | 1938-1951 | 0 | - | Folded after 1951 season |
| Waverley | | Rovers | Waverley Oval, Waverley | – | 1946 | 1946-1954 | 0 | - | Left league after 1954 season |

=== Premierships ===
| Year | Premier | Score | Runners-up | Notes |
|---|---|---|---|---|
| 1931 | St Patricks Old Collegians | | Old Launcestonians | No grand final |
| 1932 | St Patricks Old Collegians | | Old Launcestonians | No grand final |
| 1933 | Associated Banks | | St Patricks Old Collegians | No grand final |
| 1934 | Churinga | | Old Launcestonians | No grand final |
| 1935 | St Patricks Old Collegians | | Churinga | No grand final |
| 1936 | St Patricks Old Collegians | 10.9 (69) - 8.14 (42) | Old Launcestonians | |
| 1937 | Churinga | 17.18 (120) - 8.15 (63) | Old Launcestonians | |
| 1938 | Churinga | 15.22 (122) - 12.8 (80) | Old Launcestonians | |
| 1939 | Churinga | 24.17 (161) - 7.11 (53) | Dark Blue Rovers | |
| 1940 | Churinga | 24.21 (165) - 6.7 (43) | Old Launcestonians | |
| 1941 | Dark Blue Rovers | 17.14 (116) - 17.5 (107) | Churinga | |
| 1942-45 | TAFL in recess (WWII) | | | |
| 1946 | Mowbray | 12.14 (86) - 12.11 (83) | Churinga | |
| 1947 | Mowbray | 16.18 (114) - 8.13 (61) | Churinga | |
| 1948 | St Patricks Old Collegians | 9.20 (74) - 9.16 (70) | Mowbray | |
| 1949 | Mowbray | 26.19 (175) - 6.7 (43) | Waverley | |
| 1950 | Mowbray | 12.11 (83) - 9.8 (62) | Old Launcestonians | |
| 1951 | Old Launcestonians | 11.16 (82) - 6.10 (46) | Mowbray | |
| 1952 | Old Launcestonians | 13.11 (89) - 6.12 (48) | St Patricks Old Collegians | |
| 1953 | Old Launcestonians | 9.17 (71) - 5.7 (37) | St Patricks Old Collegians | |
| 1954 | St Patricks Old Collegians | 9.12 (66) - 6.6 (42) | Old Launcestonians | |
| 1955 | St Patricks Old Collegians | 8.17 (65) - 9.5 (59) | Old Launcestonians | |
| 1956 | St Patricks Old Collegians | 8.13 (61) - 8.9 (57) | Old Launcestonians | |
| 1957 | Old Scotch Collegians | 9.8 (62) - 7.11 (53) | Old Launcestonians | |
| 1958 | Old Launcestonians | 11.15 (81) - 11.10 (76) | Old Scotch Collegians | |
| 1959 | Old Launcestonians | 11.13 (79) - 5.2 (32) | Old Scotch Collegians | |
| 1960 | Old Launcestonians | 11.14 (80) - 6.9 (45) | Old Scotch Collegians | |
| 1961 | Brooks Old Boys | 12.10 (82) - 10.17 (77) | Old Launcestonians | |
| 1962 | Old Launcestonians | 9.19 (73) - 10.8 (68) | Brooks Old Boys | |
| 1963 | Brooks Old Boys | 12.16 (88) - 10.17 (77) | Old Launcestonians | |
| 1964 | Old Launcestonians | 13.11 (89) - 9.6 (60) | Old Scotch Collegians | |
| 1965 | Mowbray | 13.13 (91) - 11.15 (81) | Deloraine | |
| 1966 | Mowbray | 8.11 (59) - 7.11 (53) | Churinga | |
| 1967 | Mowbray | 9.12 (66) - 5.12 (42) | Old Launcestonians | |
| 1968 | Mowbray | 14.19 (103) - 5.11 (41) | St Patricks Old Collegians | |
| 1969 | Mowbray | 8.7 (55) - 5.3 (33) | Old Scotch Collegians | |
| 1970 | Old Launcestonians | 13.20 (98) - 8.4 (52) | St Patricks Old Collegians | |
| 1971 | Old Launcestonians | 9.8 (62) - 8.3 (51) | St Patricks Old Collegians | |
| 1972 | Mowbray | 13.10 (88) - 11.8 (74) | Old Scotch Collegians | |
| 1973 | Mowbray | 10.9 (69) - 8.19 (67) | St Patricks Old Collegians | |
| 1974 | Mowbray | 9.20 (74) - 7.7 (49) | Colleges | |
| 1975 | Old Scotch Collegians | 13.10 (88) - 8.15 (63) | Mowbray | |
| 1976 | Old Scotch Collegians | 15.8 (98) - 8.6 (54) | Quandeine | |
| 1977 | Quandeine | 15.22 (112) - 9.7 (61) | Mowbray | |
| 1978 | Old Scotch Collegians | 12.9 (81) - 12.7 (79) | Mowbray | |
| 1979 | Quandeine | 15.7 (97) - 9.16 (70) | St Patricks Old Collegians | |
| 1980 | Old Scotch Collegians | 17.9 (111) - 14.21 (105) | Rocherlea | |
| 1981 | Rocherlea | | | |
| 1982 | Old Launcestonians | 15.12 (102) - 11.12 (78) | Old Scotch Collegians | |
| 1983 | Old Scotch Collegians | 23.8 (146) - 10.11 (71) | Old Launcestonians | |
| 1984 | St Patricks Old Collegians | 13.15 (93) - 10.8 (68) | Rocherlea | |
| 1985 | Rocherlea | 15.9 (99) 13.14 (92) | St Patricks Old Collegians | |
| 1986 | Old Scotch Collegians | 13.8 (86) - 8.7 (55) | Rocherlea | |
| 1987 | Northern Districts | 15.20 (110) - 10.11 (71) | Rocherlea | |
| 1988 | Rocherlea | 24.13 (157) - 9.8 (62) | Hillwood | |
| 1989 | Longford | 17.17 (119) - 11.12 (78) | Rocherlea | |
| 1990 | Hillwood | 12.14 (86) - 10.10 (70) | Longford | |
| 1991 | Rocherlea | 16.9 (105) - 10.16 (76) | Longford | |
| 1992 | Hillwood | 12.7 (79) - 10.6 (66) | George Town | |
| 1993 | Tamar Cats | 13.9 (87) - 9.16 (70) | George Town | |
| 1994 | University-Mowbray | 16.14 (110) - 6.19 (55) | Tamar Cats | |
| 1995 | University-Mowbray | 14.15 (99) - 10.6 (66) | Rocherlea | |

== Southern Division ==
Tasmanian Amateur Football League - Southern Division
- Most recent season or competition: 1995
- Sport: Australian rules football
- Founded: 1932
- First season: 1932
- Folded: 1995
- No. of teams: 6 (1995), 24 (historical)
- Country: Australia
- Last champion: Claremont (1995)
- Most titles: Claremont (17)
- Related competitions: Southern FL; Old Scholars FA

=== History ===
The Southern Division of the Tasmanian Amateur Football League had its origins in the Public Schools Old Boys Football Association, founded in Hobart in 1932 to provide a competition for old school boys' clubs. The inaugural clubs were Clemes Old Boys, Friends Old Boys Hutchins Old Boys and Old Virgilians. This line-up of clubs remained the same until the competition entered recess due to WWII in 1941.

Clemes did not return after the war as Clemes College merged with The Friends' School in 1945, leaving the PSOBFA with only 3 clubs. In 1947 three teams joined from the Queenborough Football Association - Old Hobartians, Teachers College and University. This saw the competition join the TAFL to become its Southern Division. The following season saw the addition of district clubs for the first time in the form of Claremont and Lindisfarne, along with old scholars club Ogilvenians. Teachers College folded after the 1947 season. Queenborough FA club Long Beach would join in 1952 to form a 9-team competition.

New clubs of the 1960s included Sorell, who joined in 1963 and Bridgewater, who joined in 1968. Claremont's 1974 flag marked the beginning of a 22-year period of dominance over the competition, in which they won 15 of a possible 22 premierships. Oatlands and Cambridge both played briefly during the early 1970s, while new club Dominic Old Scholars Association (DOSA) joined in 1976.

The 1981 season saw a significant change in the structure of the Southern Division, with the clubs separating into two divisions - the District Division and Old Scholars Division. These two divisions played separate rosters, with the premier of each playing off to decide the overall Southern Premier. This system continued until 1987, when the seven clubs of the Old Scholars Division split from the TAFL to form the Old Scholars Football Association. The Southern Division was left with only seven clubs, and after the departure of Richmond in 1991 was forced to run with only six teams. This situation was seen as undesirable, and movement to create a united Southern Tasmanian football league began in the mid-1990s. This came about in 1996, when the six remaining Southern Division clubs combined with Kingston and Channel of the Huon Football Association to form the Southern Football League, thus putting an end to the TAFL's existence.

=== Clubs ===
==== Final ====
| Club | Colours | Nickname | Home Ground | Former League | Est. | Years in TAFL | TAFL Senior Premierships | | Fate |
| Club | Colours | Nickname | Home Ground | Former League | Est. | Years in TAFL | Total | Years | Fate |
|---|---|---|---|---|---|---|---|---|---|
| Claremont | | Magpies | Abbotsfield Park, Claremont | SDFA | 1924 | 1948-1995 | 17 | 1965, 1968, 1974, 1975, 1976, 1978, 1979, 1980, 1981, 1984, 1986, 1987, 1988, 1992, 1993, 1994, 1995 | Formed Southern FL in 1996 |
| Lachlan | | Bombers | Kensington Park, New Norfolk | STFA | 1922 | 1987-1995 | 0 | - | Formed Southern FL in 1996 |
| Lauderdale | | Cats | Lauderdale Oval, Lauderdale | TFA | 1979 | 1981-1995 | 1 | 1991 | Formed Southern FL in 1996 |
| Lindisfarne | (1957)(1960s)(1970s)(1980s) | Two Blues | Anzac Park, Lindisfarne | CSDFA, AYC | 1911 | 1948-1957, 1960-1995 | 3 | 1957, 1982, 1989 | Played in AYC between 1958-59. Formed Southern FL in 1996 |
| Mangalore | | Robins | Brighton Regional Sports Complex, Pontville | TFA | 1885 | 1981-1995 | 1 | 1985 | Formed Southern FL in 1996 |
| Sorell | (1963-?)(?-1995) | Eagles | Pembroke Park, Sorell | SEDFA | 1883 | 1963-1995 | 3 | 1966, 1983 (DD), 1990 | Formed Southern FL in 1996 |

==== Former ====
| Club | Colours | Nickname | Home Ground | Former League | Est. | Years in TAFL | TAFL Senior Premierships | | Fate |
| Club | Colours | Nickname | Home Ground | Former League | Est. | Years in TAFL | Total | Years | Fate |
|---|---|---|---|---|---|---|---|---|---|
| Bridgewater | (1960s)(?-1984) | Swans | Weily Park Oval, Bridgewater | SDFA | 1885 | 1968-1969, 1972, 1974-1984 | 0 | - | Recess between 1970-71 and in 1973. Folded after 1984 season |
| Cambridge | | Magpies | Cambridge Oval, Cambridge | AYC | 1885 | 1970-1972 | 0 | - | Returned to AYC in 1973 |
| City (Long Beach 1952-55) | Dark with light monogram | | | QFA | 1930 | 1952-1967 | 0 | - | Folded after 1967 season |
| Clemes Old Boys | | | | – | 1930 | 1932-1940 | 1 | 1934 | Did not re-form after WWII |
| Dominic Old Scholars Association (DOSA) | | Roosters | Dominic College Football Ground, Glenorchy | – | 1976 | 1976-1986 | 2 | 1984 (OS), 1986 (OS) | Formed Old Scholars FA in 1987 |
| Elizabeth Matriculation | | | | – | 1970 | 1970-? | 0 | - | Folded at unknown date |
| Friends' Old Boys | | Bulldogs | Friends' School Oval, North Hobart | – | 1932 | 1932-1986 | 8 | 1937, 1939, 1955, 1956, 1958, 1959, 1960, 1962 | Formed Old Scholars FA in 1987 |
| Hobart Matriculation | | | | – | 1968 | 1968-1972 | 0 | - | Folded after 1972 season |
| Hutchins' Old Boys | | Lions | Queenborough Oval, Sandy Bay | – | 1932 | 1932-1986 | 11 | 1932, 1935, 1936, 1938, 1940, 1946, 1961, 1963, 1964, 1981 (OS), 1983 | Formed Old Scholars FA in 1987 |
| Hydro | Dark with light monogram | | | QFA | 1939 | 1955-1959 | 0 | - | Folded after 1959 season |
| New Town Old Scholars (Ogilvenians 1948-1960, Ogilvie Tech Old Scholars/OTOS 1961-85) | | Devils | New Town High School Oval, New Town | | 1935 | 1948-1986 | 1 | 1953 | Formed Old Scholars FA in 1987 |
| Oatlands | | Tigers | Oatlands Oval, Oatlands | MFL | 1879 | 1972-1973 | 0 | - | Moved to South East District FA in 1974 |
| Old Hobartians Association (OHA) | (1969)(1972)(1982) | Ships | Geilston Bay Oval, Geilston Bay | QFA | 1919 | 1947-1986 | 5 | 1948, 1967, 1969, 1972, 1982 (OS) | Formed Old Scholars FA in 1987 |
| Richmond | | Blues | Richmond War Memorial Oval, Richmond | SEDFA | 1878 | 1991 | 0 | - | Moved to Tasman FA in 1992 |
| Richmond-Campania | | | Richmond War Memorial Oval, Richmond and Campania Recreation Ground, Campania | – | 1980 | 1980-1990 | 0 | - | De-merged into Richmond and Campania after 1990 season |
| St Virgils Old Boys/Old Virgilians Association (OVA) | | Saints | St Virgils College Oval, Austins Ferry | WHFA | 1927 | 1932-1986 | 6 | 1833, 1947, 1950, 1951, 1952, 1954 | Formed Old Scholars FA in 1987 |
| Teachers College | | | | QFA | | 1947 | 0 | - | Folded after 1947 season |
| University | | Rainbows | University Football Oval, Sandy Bay | QFA | 1936 | 1947-1986 | 6 | 1949, 1970, 1971, 1973, 1977, 1981 (OS) | Formed Old Scholars FA in 1987 |

=== Premierships ===
Between 1981 and 1986 the Southern Challenger was decided via a play-off between the premier of the District Division and the Old Scholars Division.

| Year | Premier | Score | Runners-up | Notes |
Public School Old Boys Football Association
| 1932 | Hutchins | 11.14 (80) - 5.9 (39) | St Virgils | |
| 1933 | St Virgils | 13.14 (92) - 13.13 (91) | Friends | |
| 1934 | Clemes | 12.9 (81) - 6.11 (47) | Hutchins | |
| 1935 | Hutchins | 7.11 (53) - 6.12 (48) | Clemes | |
| 1936 | Hutchins | 15.13 (103) - 9.8 (62) | Clemes | |
| 1937 | Friends | 12.14 (86) - 9.13 (67) | Hutchins | |
| 1938 | Hutchins | 12.11 (83) - 9.9 (63) | Friends | |
| 1939 | Friends | 11.12 (78) - 7.15 (57) | Hutchins | |
| 1940 | Hutchins | 12.13 (85) - 7.11 (53) | St Virgils | |
| 1941-45 | PSOBFA in recess (WWII) | | | |
| 1946 | Hutchins | 9.18 (72) - 8.15 (63) | St Virgils | |
TAFL Southern Division
| 1947 | St Virgils | 13.9 (87) - 11.13 (79) | Hutchins | |
| 1948 | OHA | 14.8 (92) - 10.13 (73) | St Virgils | |
| 1949 | University | 14.8 (92) - 11.19 (85) | Hutchins | |
| 1950 | St Virgils | 11.9 (75) - 7.15 (57) | Claremont | |
| 1951 | St Virgils | 15.22 (112) - 13.6 (84) | Claremont | |
| 1952 | St Virgils | 10.15 (75) - 5.10 (40) | Ogilvenians | |
| 1953 | Ogilvenians | 13.18 (96) - 10.16 (76) | Long Beach | |
| 1954 | St Virgils | 10.11 (71) - 8.9 (57) | Friends | |
| 1955 | Friends | 15.10 (100) - 4.8 (32) | Hutchins | |
| 1956 | Friends | 17.15 (117) - 8.12 (60) | Ogilvenians | |
| 1957 | Lindisfarne | 12.14 (86) - 6.8 (44) | Ogilvenians | |
| 1958 | Friends | 10.17 (77) - 5.10 (40) | Hutchins | |
| 1959 | Friends | 8.13 (61) - 2.9 (21) | University | |
| 1960 | Friends | 10.10 (70) - 6.10 (46) | University | |
| 1961 | Hutchins | 13.9 (87) - 8.14 (62) | Friends | |
| 1962 | Friends | 7.9 (51) - 5.9 (39) | Ogilvenians | |
| 1963 | Hutchins | 11.22 (88) - 10.9 (69) | Lindisfarne | |
| 1964 | Hutchins | 8.11 (59) - 7.16 (58) | University | |
| 1965 | Claremont | 13.16 (94) - 8.9 (57) | University | |
| 1966 | Sorell | 16.20 (116) - 15.11 (101) | OTOS | |
| 1967 | OHA | 10.15 (75) - 7.12 (54) | Claremont | |
| 1968 | Claremont | 8.9 (57) - 8.5 (53) | University | |
| 1969 | OHA | 16.13 (109) - 8.12 (60) | University | |
| 1970 | University | 11.24 (90) - 9.7 (61) | Bridgewater | |
| 1971 | University | 13.15 (93) - 11.12 (78) | Friends | |
| 1972 | OHA | 16.15 (111) - 10.13 (73) | Friends | |
| 1973 | University | 15.11 (101) - 9.9 (63) | Sorell | |
| 1974 | Claremont | 14.17 (101) - 9.8 (62) | Hutchins | |
| 1975 | Claremont | 15.17 (107) - 12.9 (81) | St Virgils | |
| 1976 | Claremont | 19.9 (123) - 12.15 (87) | Sorell | |
| 1977 | University | 12.17 (89) - 11.7 (73) | Sorell | |
| 1978 | Claremont | 9.15 (69) - 5.20 (50) | Sorell | |
| 1979 | Claremont | 12.17 (89) - 11.10 (76) | Lindisfarne | |
| 1980 | Claremont | 12.17 (89) - 10.9 (69) | Hutchins | |
1981-86: Two divisions, premier of each played off for overall title
| 1981 | Claremont | 15.13 (103) - 6.12 (48) | Hutchins | |
| 1982 | Lindisfarne | 18.11 (119) - 14.8 (92) | OHA | |
| 1983 | Hutchins | 16.21 (117) - 13.13 (91) | Sorell | |
| 1984 | Claremont | 18.24 (132) - 16.13 (109) | DOSA | |
| 1985 | Mangalore | 16.15 (111) - 13.14 (92) | University | |
| 1986 | Claremont | 14.11 (95) - 9.8 (62) | DOSA | |
1987: Return to one division
| 1987 | Claremont | 12.15 (87) - 4.7 (31) | Mangalore | |
| 1988 | Claremont | 15.19 (109) - 8.10 (58) | Lindisfarne | |
| 1989 | Lindisfarne | 11.16 (82) - 11.12 (78) | Claremont | |
| 1990 | Sorell | 14.9 (93) - 13.13 (91) | Claremont | |
| 1991 | Lauderdale | 16.10 (106) - 14.10 (94) | Claremont | |
| 1992 | Claremont | 8.12 (60) - 3.8 (26) | Lindisfarne | |
| 1993 | Claremont | 10.10 (70) - 9.7 (61) | Lauderdale | |
| 1994 | Claremont | 13.7 (85) - 10.3 (63) | Mangalore | |
| 1995 | Claremont | 21.10 (136) - 16.6 (102) | Sorell | |

==== District Division (1981-86) ====
| Year | Premier | Score | Runners-up | Notes |
|---|---|---|---|---|
| 1981 | Claremont | 19.16 (130) - 19.10 (124) | Richmond-Campania | |
| 1982 | Lindisfarne | 12.8 (80) - 7.11 (53) | Claremont | |
| 1983 | Sorell | 19.10 (124) - 8.12 (60) | Richmond-Campania | |
| 1984 | Claremont | 12.14 (86) - 11.12 (78) | Mangalore | |
| 1985 | Mangalore | 12.7 (79) - 10.11 (71) | Claremont | |
| 1986 | Claremont | 12.11 (83) - 8.10 (58) | Mangalore | |

==== Old Scholars division (1981-86) ====
| Year | Premier | Score | Runners-up | Notes |
|---|---|---|---|---|
| 1981 | Hutchins | 9.14 (68) - 7.15 (57) | OTOS | |
| 1982 | OHA | 18.16 (124) - 6.8 (44) | Friends | |
| 1983 | Hutchins | 11.14 (80) - 8.7 (55) | OHA | |
| 1984 | DOSA | 9.6 (60) - 5.9 (39) | Hutchins | |
| 1985 | University | 10.18 (78) - 9.15 (69) | Friends | |
| 1986 | DOSA | 20.9 (129) - 6.12 (48) | University | |

== Conder Shield ==
The Conder Shield was awarded to the winner of a match played between the premiers of the Northern Division and Southern Division at the close of the season. Prior to 1948, the Shield was awarded to the winner of a knockout tournament held by the Northern Division, with the Southern Premier given the right to challenge this winner for the Shield.

=== Results ===
| Year | Winner | Score | Runners-up | Notes |
|---|---|---|---|---|
| 1932 | St Patricks Old Collegians | 14.10 (94) - 8.5 (53) | Old Launcestonians | |
| 1933 | Associated Banks | 11.21 (87) - 7.9 (51) | Old Launcestonians | |
| 1934 | Churinga | 17.15 (117) - 0.5 (5) | Dark Blue Rovers | |
| 1935 | Hutchins | 17.19 (121) - 13.10 (88) | St Patricks Old Collegians | |
| 1936 | Hutchins | 25.13 (163) - 12.12 (84) | St Patricks Old Collegians | |
| 1937 | Churinga | 13.19 (97) - 12.5 (77) | Friends | |
| 1938 | Churinga | 13.19 (97) - 11.7 (73) | Hutchins | |
| 1939 | Churinga | 23.17 (155) - 7.11 (53) | Friends | |
| 1940 | Churinga | 20.14 (134) - 6.11 (47) | St Patricks Old Collegians | |
| 1941 | Churinga | 10.15 (75) - 9.13 (67) | St Patricks Old Collegians | |
| 1942-45 | Amateurs in recess (WWII) | | | |
| 1946 | Hutchins | 25.19 (169) - 11.7 (73) | Waverley | |
| 1947 | Churinga | 18.17 (125) - 16.8 (104) | St Virgils | |
| 1948 | St Patricks Old Collegians | 13.10 (88) - 8.9 (57) | OHA | |
| 1949 | Mowbray | 15.15 (105) - 10.14 (74) | University | |
| 1950 | Mowbray | 14.14 (98) - 12.14 (86) | St Virgils | |
| 1951 | St Virgils | 18.17 (125) - 17.13 (115) | Old Launcestonians | |
| 1952 | Old Launcestonians | 12.19 (91) - 8.11 (59) | St Virgils | |
| 1953 | Old Launcestonians | 14.16 (100) - 11.12 (78) | Ogilvenians | |
| 1954 | St Patricks Old Collegians | 19.15 (129) - 7.4 (46) | St Virgils | |
| 1955 | Friends | 16.11 (107) - 9.4 (58) | St Patricks Old Collegians | |
| 1956 | Friends | 13.20 (98) - 6.5 (41) | St Patricks Old Collegians | |
| 1957 | Lindisfarne | 24.11 (155) - 5.11 (41) | Old Scotch Collegians | |
| 1958 | Friends | 12.13 (85) - 9.7 (61) | Old Launcestonians | |
| 1959 | Friends | 13.12 (90) - 13.11 (89) | Old Launcestonians | |
| 1960 | Old Launcestonians | 15.13 (103) - 8.14 (62) | Friends | |
| 1961 | Hutchins | 20.18 (138) - 13.17 (95) | Brooks Old Boys | |
| 1962 | Friends | 8.9 (57) - 5.9 (39) | Old Launcestonians | |
| 1963 | Hutchins | 26.18 (197) - 13.8 (86) | Brooks Old Boys | |
| 1964 | Old Launcestonians | 14.14 (98) - 12.10 (82) | Hutchins | |
| 1965 | Mowbray | 13.21 (99) - 9.5 (59) | Claremont | |
| 1966 | Sorell | 14.16 (100) - 8.7 (55) | Mowbray | |
| 1967 | OHA | 18.24 (132) - 11.3 (69) | Mowbray | |
| 1968 | Claremont | 11.14 (80) - 10.13 (73) | Mowbray | |
| 1969 | OHA | 14.15 (99) - 8.12 (60) | Mowbray | |
| 1970 | University | 11.5 (71) - 3.14 (32) | Old Launcestonians | |
| 1971 | University | 26.12 (168) - 3.14 (32) | Old Launcestonians | |
| 1972 | OHA | 10.12 (72) - 7.8 (50) | Mowbray | |
| 1973 | University | 15.9 (99) - 8.7 (55) | Mowbray | |
| 1974 | Claremont | 21.16 (142) - 6.14 (50) | Mowbray | |
| 1975 | Not awarded | | | |
| 1976 | Old Scotch Collegians | 14.6 (90) - 13.10 (88) | Claremont | |
| 1977 | University | 12.18 (90) - 10.18 (78) | Quandeine | |
| 1978 | Claremont | 14.14 (100) - 3.8 (26) | Old Scotch Collegians | |
| 1979 | Claremont | | Quandeine | No final played as Quandeine forfeited. |
| 1980 | Old Scotch Collegians | 18.20 (128) - 8.9 (57) | Claremont | |
| 1981 | Claremont | 22.18 (150) - 9.15 (69) | Rocherlea | |
| 1982 | Old Launcestonians | 11.8 (74) - 7.11 (53) | Lindisfarne | |
| 1983 | Hutchins | 21.17 (143) - 10.14 (74) | Old Scotch Collegians | |
| 1984 | Claremont | 16.15 (111) - 12.6 (78) | St Patricks Old Collegians | |
| 1985 | Mangalore | 24.13 (157) - 15.5 (95) | Rocherlea | |
| 1986 | Claremont | 15.10 (100) - 10.13 (73) | Old Scotch Collegians | |
| 1987 | Claremont | 19.14 (128) - 10.12 (72) | Northern Districts | |
| 1988 | Rocherlea | 18.21 (129) - 8.12 (60) | Claremont | |
| 1989 | Lindisfarne | 21.15 (141) - 12.8 (80) | Longford | |
| 1990 | Not awarded | | | |
| 1991 | Not awarded | | | |
| 1992 | Claremont | 20.16 (136) - 13.7 (85) | Hillwood | |
| 1993 | Claremont | 17.18 (120) - 2.11 (23) | Tamar Cats | |
| 1994 | Not awarded | | | |
| 1995 | Not awarded | | | |

==== Table of victors ====
| Club | Victories | | Runners-Up | |
| Club | Total | Years | Total | Years |
|---|---|---|---|---|
| Claremont | 10 | 1968, 1974, 1978, 1979, 1981, 1984, 1986, 1987, 1992, 1993 | 4 | 1965, 1976, 1980, 1988 |
| Churinga | 7 | 1934, 1937, 1938, 1939, 1940, 1941, 1947 | 0 | – |
| Hutchins | 6 | 1935, 1936, 1946, 1961, 1963, 1983 | 2 | 1938, 1964 |
| Old Launcestonians | 5 | 1952, 1953, 1960, 1964, 1982 | 6 | 1951, 1958, 1959, 1962, 1970, 1971 |
| University | 4 | 1970, 1971, 1973, 1977 | 1 | 1949 |
| Mowbray | 3 | 1949, 1950, 1965 | 7 | 1966, 1967, 1968, 1969, 1972, 1973, 1974 |
| St Patrick's Old Collegians | 3 | 1932, 1948, 1954 | 7 | 1935, 1936, 1940, 1941, 1955, 1956, 1984 |
| Old Hobartians Association | 3 | 1967, 1969, 1972 | 1 | 1948 |
| Old Scotch Collegians | 2 | 1976, 1980 | 4 | 1957, 1978, 1983, 1986 |
| St Virgils | 1 | 1951 | 4 | 1947, 1950, 1952, 1954 |
| Rocherlea | 1 | 1988 | 2 | 1981, 1985 |
| Associated Banks | 1 | 1933 | 0 | – |
| Sorell | 1 | 1966 | 0 | – |
| Mangalore | 1 | 1985 | 0 | – |
| Brooks Old Boys | 0 | – | 2 | 1961, 1963 |
| Quandeine | 0 | – | 2 | 1977, 1979 |
| Dark Blue Rovers | 0 | – | 1 | 1934 |
| Waverley | 0 | – | 1 | 1946 |
| Ogilvenians | 0 | – | 1 | 1953 |
| Northern Districts | 0 | – | 1 | 1987 |
| Longford | 0 | – | 1 | 1988 |
| Hillwood | 0 | – | 1 | 1992 |
| Tamar Cats | 0 | – | 1 | 1993 |

== EJ Coulter Shield ==
The EJ Coulter Shield was awarded to the winner of the annual North vs South representative match.

| Year | Premier | Score | Runners-up | Notes |
|---|---|---|---|---|
| 1932 | North | 10.17 (72) - 7.10 (52) | South | |
| 1932 | North | 12.13 (85) - 11.8 (74) | South | |
| 1933 | South | 22.9 (141) - 15.18 (108) | North | |
| 1933 | South | 15.15 (105) - 13.7 (83) | North | |
| 1934 | South | 15.18 (108) - 6.15 (51) | North | |
| 1934 | South | 15.9 (109) - 9.8 (62) | North | |
| 1935 | South | 11.10 (76) - 6.12 (48) | North | |
| 1936 | North | 15.17 (107) - 13.9 (87) | South | |
| 1937 | South | 21.15 (141) - 8.6 (54) | North | |
| 1938 | South | 11.7 (73) - 8.15 (63) | North | |
| 1939 | | | | Game abandoned - shield not awarded |
| 1940 | North | 20.28 (148) - 12.11 (83) | South | |
| 1941-46 | Football in recess (WWII) | | | |
| 1947 | South | 19.24 (138) - 10.8 (68) | North | |
| 1947 | North | 10.15 (75) - 10.13 (73) | South | |
| 1948 | North | 13.14 (92) - 11.19 (75) | South | |
| 1948 | South | 13.23 (101) - 8.9 (51) | North | |
| 1949 | North | 16.11 (113) - 5.10 (40) | South | |
| 1950 | North | 8.15 (63) - 7.17 (59) | South | |
| 1951 | North | 12.17 (89) - 6.12 (48) | South | |
| 1952 | South | 15.17 (107) - 13.7 (85) | North | |
| 1953 | North | 15.17 (107) - 4.7 (31) | South | |
| 1954 | South | 15.17 (107) - 13.7 (85) | North | |
| 1955 | South | 10.16 (76) - 10.13 (73) | North | |
| 1956 | South | 16.12 (118) - 7.6 (48) | North | |
| 1957 | South | 10.27 (87) - 9.9 (63) | North | |
| 1958 | South | 24.18 (162) - 3.3 (21) | North | |
| 1959 | South | 12.12 (84) - 9.15 (69) | North | |
| 1960 | South | 14.16 (100) -10.14 (74) | North | |
| 1961 | North | 18.12 (120) - 11.17 (83) | South | |
| 1962 | South | 17.22 (124) - 9.9 (63) | North | |
| 1963 | South | 11.20 (86) - 6.10 (46) | North | |
| 1964 | North | 13.14 (92) - 12.6 (78) | South | |
| 1965 | North | 17.11 (113) - 11.8 (74) | South | |
| 1966 | South | 15.19 (109) - 6.11 (47) | North | |
| 1967 | South | 18.10 (118) - 11.12 (78) | North | |
| 1968 | South | 11.14 (80) - 7.9 (51) | North | |
| 1969 | South | 13.16 (94) - 10.14 (74) | North | |
| 1970 | South | 16.15 (111) - 11.12 (78) | North | |
| 1971 | South | 20.20 (140) - 5.6 (36) | North | |
| 1972 | South | 16.19 (115) - 16.12 (108) | North | |
| 1973 | South | 16.12 (108) - 6.13 (49) | North | |
| 1974 | South | 12.10 (82) - 9.13 (67) | North | |
| 1975 | South | 18.10 (118) - 9.8 (62) | North | |
| 1976 | South | 22.26 (158) - 16.9 (105) | North | |
| 1977 | South | 10.19 (79) - 1.8 (14) | North | |
| 1978 | South | 17.14 (116) - 14.16 (100) | North | |
| 1979 | South | 10.12 (72) - 9.10 (64) | North | |
| 1980 | South | 28.18 (183) - 13.15 (93) | North | |
| 1981 | South | 12.18 (90) - 11.12 (78) | North | |
| 1982 | South | 24.14 (158) - 13.11 (89) | North | |
| 1983 | South | 20.12 (132) - 12.14 (86) | North | |
| 1984 | South | 17.11 (113) - 12.17 (89) | North | |
| 1985 | South | 14.20 (104) - 11.11 (77) | North | |
| 1986 | South | 11.15 (81) - 8.15 (58) | North | |
| 1987 | North | 5.13 (43) - 5.9 (39) | South | |
| 1988 | North | 19.9 (123) -12.15 (87) | South | |
| 1989 | North | 20.13 (133) - 11.10 (76) | South | |
| 1990 | North | 21.9 (135) -14.13 (97) | South | |
| 1991 | North | ?.? (150) - ?.? (71) | South | |
| 1992 | North | | South | |
| 1993 | North | 8.8 (56) - 7.8 (50) | South | |
| 1994 | South | 8.6 (54) - 4.10 (34) | North | |
| 1995 | North | 14.9 (93) - 10.5 (65) | South | |
