= Tasman Football Association =

The Tasman Football Association was an Australian rules football competition in Tasmania, Australia. The association had origins back to 1902 when games were played at random. In 1910 a proper association was set up. The association went into recess during World War II but returned.

The association folded after the 2001 season with the Dodges Ferry Sharks moving to the Southern Football League while the Swansea Football Club moved to the Oatlands District Football Association (ODFA). Campania folded but reformed in 2007 and joined the ODFA.

== History ==
The Tasman Football Association was officially formed in 1910 but games had been played from approximately 1902 in the area. The teams in the first year of the competition were Wedge Bay, Nubeena, Carnarvon, Koonya and Fortescue Bay. The first premiership was won by Koonya who defeated Nubeena in the grand final.

Carnarvon were the most successful club in the early years of the competition, taking out seven titles between 1922 and 1931. Koonya and Nubeena were also premiership winners during this period. Prior to WW2, the Tasman Rovers won three premierships between 1935 and 1937 before Port Arthur went back to back in 1938–39 before the war began. Taranna Football Club won their only known senior premiership in 1934 with a 13.17-95 to 5.7-37 win over Port Arthur.

The competition resumed after WW2 in 1946 with Port Arthur taking off where they left off winning the 1946 and 1947 premierships. Around this time Dunalley, joined the competition and almost straight away became a powerhouse of the competition. The 1960s were dominated by the Nubeena Tigers with the club winning 6 straight premierships and 12 premierships between 1957 and 1971. The 1972 season saw the introduction of the reserves competition, which Dunalley won the first 3 flags in, including winning the double seniors/reserves premierships in 1974. The 1978 season saw the Dodges Ferry Sharks Football Club enter the competition playing home games at the Copping Football Ground before Shark Park in Dodges Ferry was created. Dodges Ferry won both the seniors and reserves premierships in both 1979 and 1980.

New club Lauderdale joined the association in 1979. The South East District Football Association (SEDFA) folded at the end of the 1979 season which saw Mangalore and Triabunna join the competition. Mangalore, who won the final SEDFA premiership in 1979 fell 5 points short of Dodges Ferry in the 1980 grand final. The club left after only 1 season to join the newly created Tasmanian Amateur Football League (Southern Division). Lauderdale then also left after the 1980 season.

Dunalley Football Club won back to back premierships in 1981–82, before new club Triabunna won 5 out of the next 6 premierships to be the dominant club throughout the 1980s. Triabunna also won 7 reserves premierships during this period.

The 1981 season also saw foundation club Nubeena go into recess due to a lack of players. The Tasman Football Club entered in 1983, however, only lasted 3 seasons before going into recess at the completion of the 1985 season. In 1988 Nubeena and Port Arthur reformed to join the newly created Peninsula Football Association. Dodges Ferry won the 1989, 1990 & 1991 premierships. An Under 16 competition was introduced in 1989, Campania winning this in its inaugural year. The 1992 season saw Richmond and Railway Football clubs join the competition, with Richmond going down to Triabunna by 3 points in the grand final and winning both the reserves and Under 16 premierships. Richmond then won the next 4 premierships between 1993 and 1996.

Railway Football Club went into recess at the completion of 1993 season due a shortage of players and former Fingal District Football Association club, Swansea joined the competition that year. Other clubs to go into recess during the 1990s included Dunalley in 1996 and Campania in 1998. Campania would come out of recess 10 years later in the ODFA where they still compete today.

North Derwent won their only Tasman Football Association premiership in 1998 with a hard fought 3 goal win over Swansea. Swansea then won their first premiership in the competition, the following year in 1999.

Prior to the 2000 season, Risdon Vale, went into recess due to a lack of players forcing the competition to compete with only 5 sides for the season. The season saw Richmond beat Triabunna in the decider by 30 points with Swansea winning their first reserves premiership in 25 years.

At the completion of the 2000 season, Richmond successfully applied and joined the Old Scholars Football Association and Triabunna joined the Oatlands District Football Association (ODFA). This left only 3 teams for the following season in Dodges Ferry, Cambridge & Swansea. However, Risdon Vale reformed and entered both a seniors and reserves team. Railway also attempted to enter teams after going into recess after the 1993 season.

However, Railway were unable to eventuate on this and Cambridge withdrew part way through the season leaving the competition to finish the season with only 3 clubs. Swansea won the grand final 28.13-181 over Dodges Ferry 9.13-67, with Dodges Ferry winning the reserves grand final over Swansea. This would be the final season of the Tasman Football Association which had been around for about 100 years.

Around this time Dodges Ferry was a fast-growing area and applied and successfully joined the bigger Southern Football League. The club has since won the 2006 senior premiership and coming runners up in 2010.

Swansea then joined the ODFA were Triabunna, had the previous season. Swansea went on to win the 2004 and 2007 ODFA senior premierships before going into recess prior to the 2019 season due to a shortage of players.

This left only Risdon Vale in the competition and with no option but to go into recess. Risdon Vale's players went to other clubs including Lindisfarne in the Southern Football League and OHA in the Old Scholars Football Association.

Teams to compete in the league at some stage were Port Arthur, Tunnel Bay, Taranna, TPT Rovers, Saltwater River, Wanderers (later named Timberworkers), Dunalley, Cambridge, Rokeby, Copping, Risdon Vale, Mangalore, Lauderdale, Sorell Seconds Team, Dodges Ferry, Swansea, North Derwent, Tasman Rovers, Railway, Tasman, Richmond and Campania, Lauderdale & Triabunna.

== Clubs ==
=== Final ===
Club	Colours	Nickname	Home Ground	Former League	Est.	Years in TFA	TFA Premierships		Fate
Club	Colours	Nickname	Home Ground	Former League	Est.	Years in TFA	Total	Years	Fate
Cambridge		Magpies	Cambridge Oval, Cambridge	STFA	1885	1961-1962, 1982-2001	0	-	Folded partway through 2001 season
Dodges Ferry	(1978-?)(1990s)(?-2001)	Sharks	Dodges Ferry Recreation Ground, Dodges Ferry	–	1978	1978-2001	6	1979, 1980, 1984, 1989, 1990, 1991	Moved to Southern FL following 2001 season
Risdon Vale		Tigers	Risdon Vale Park, Risdon Vale	STFA	1969	1982-1984, 1998-2001	0	-	Folded after 2001 season
Swansea		Swans	Swansea Oval, Swansea	FDFA	1890s	1993-2001	2	1999, 2001	Moved to Oatlands District FA following 2001 season

=== Former ===
Club	Colours	Nickname	Home Ground	Former League	Est.	Years in TFA	TFA Premierships		Fate
Club	Colours	Nickname	Home Ground	Former League	Est.	Years in TFA	Total	Years	Fate
Campania		Wallabies	Campania Recreation Reserve, Campania	SEDFA	1882	1988-1997	0	-	Folded after 1997 season, re-formed in Oatlands District FA in 2007
Copping			Copping Oval, Copping	PFA	1884	1951-1982	7	1956, 1959, 1970, 1972, 1973, 1975, 1978	Folded after 1982 season
Dunalley		Bulldogs	Dunalley Football Oval, Dunalley	PFA	1903	1951-1995	8	1952, 1953, 1961, 1974, 1976, 1977, 1981, 1982	Folded after 1995 season
Fortescue Bay				–		1910-?	0	-	Folded prior to WWI
Koonya			Koonya Football Ground, Koonya	–	1902	1910-1950	3	1910, 1930, 1948	Folded after 1950 season
Lauderdale		Magpies	Lauderdale Oval, Lauderdale	–	1979	1979-1980	0	-	Moved to TAFL Southern Divisionfollowing 1980 season
Mangalore		Robins	Pontville Oval, Pontville	SEDFA	1885	1980	0	-	Moved to TAFL Southern Division following 1980 season
North Derwent		Foresters	Boyer Oval, New Norfolk	STFA	1984	1991-1998	1	1998	Folded after 1998 season
Nubeena		Tigers	Nubeena Recreation Ground, Nubeena	–	1892	1910-1981	18	1914, 1924, 1933, 1949, 1950, 1951, 1955, 1957, 1958, 1960, 1962, 1963, 1964, 1965, 1966, 1967, 1969, 1971	Entered recess after 1981 season, re-formed in Peninsula FA in 1988
Port Arthur (Carnarvon 1902-30s)		Kangaroos	Port Arthur Sports Ground, Port Arthur	–	1902	1910-1980	12	1922, 1925, 1927, 1928, 1929, 1931, 1938, 1939, 1946, 1947, 1954, 1968	Entered recess after round 1 of 1980 season, moved to Peninsula FA after 1987 season
Railway		Blues	Clare Street Oval, New Town	STFA	1876	1992-1993	0	-	Folded after 1993 season
Richmond		Lions	Richmond War Memorial Oval, Richmond	TAFL	1878	1992-2000	5	1993, 1994, 1995, 1996, 2000	Moved to Old Scholars FA following 2000 season
Rokeby		Hawks	Clarendon Vale Oval, Clarendon Vale		1884	1985-1988	0	-	Folded after 1988 season
Saltwater River				–		?	0	-	?
Taranna			Taranna Oval, Taranna	–	1933	1933-1935	1	1934	Folded after 1935 season
Tasman		Bombers	Copping Oval, Copping and Nubeena Recreation Ground, Nubeena	–	1983	1983-1985	0	-	Folded after 1985 season
Timberworkers				–		1936-?	0	-	Folded prior to WWII
TPT Rovers/Tasman Rovers				–	1930	1935-?, 1949-1950	3	1935, 1936, 1937	Folded after 1950 season
Triabunna		Kangaroos	Triabunna Recreation Ground, Triabunna	SEDFA	1900	1980-2000	7	1983, 1985, 1986 1987, 1988, 1992, 1997	Moved to Oatlands District FA following 2000 season
Tunnel Bay				–		1922-?, 1947	0	-	Folded after 1947 season
Wedge Bay				–	1902	1910	0	-	Folded

== Premiers ==
Year	Seniors	Reserves	Under 16s
1910	Koonya def. Nubeena		
1911			
1912			
1913			
1914	Nubeena		
1915	WW1		
1916	WW1		
1917	WW1		
1918	WW1		
1919	Influenza outbreak		
1920			
1921			
1922	Carnarvon 5.7-37 def. Timberworkers 4.1--35		
1923			
1924	Nubeena		
1925	Carnarvon		
1926			
1927	Carnarvon		
1928	Carnarvon		
1929	Carnarvon		
1930	Koonya 4.15-39 def. Carnarvon 2.7-19		
1931	Carnarvon		
1932	Carnavon 9.12-66 def. Nubeena 7.9-=51		
1933	Nubeena 9.16-78 def. Carnavon 8.10-58		
1934	Taranna 13.17-95 def. Port Arthur 5.7-37		
1935	Tasman Rovers def. Taranna		
1936	Tasman Rovers 6.13-49 def. Wanderers 4.11-35		
1937	Tasman Rovers 16.14-110 def. Koonya 13.8-86		
1938	Port Arthur 11.15-81 def. Nubeena 11.5-71		
1939	Port Arthur 12.10-82 def. Koonya 6.17-53		
1940	WW2		
1941	WW2		
1942	WW2		
1943	WW2		
1944	WW2		
1945	WW2		
1946	Port Arthur 10.15-75 def. Koonya 7.9-51		
1947	Port Arthur 11.11-77 def. Nubeena 8.9-57		
1948	Koonya 9.10-64 def. Nubeena 6.19-55		
1949	Nubeena 22.10-142 def. TPT Rovers 8.8-56		
1950	Nubeena def. Port Arthur		
1951	Nubeena 6.16-52 def. Dunalley 5.8-38		
1952	Dunalley 7.13-55 def. Nubeena 6.13-49		
1953	Dunalley 9.11-64 def. Nubeena 8.10-58		
1954	Port Arthur def. Dunalley		
1955	Nubeena def. Dunalley		
1956	Copping 9.15-69 def. Port Arthur 4.5-29		
1957	Nubeena 11.10-76 def. Dunalley 9.14-68		
1958	Nubeena 11.20-86 def. Copping 9.16-70		
1959	Copping 16.23-119 def. Nubeena 13.10-88		
1960	Nubeena 13.24-102 def. Port Arthur 8.10-58		
1961	Dunalley 9.12-66 def. Port Arthur 5.11-41		
1962	Nubeena 16.20-116 def. Cambridge 5.11-41		
1963	Nubeena 7.13-55 def. Port Arthur 5.7-37		
1964	Nubeena 17.20-122 def. Port Arthur 5.7-37		
1965	Nubeena 18.21-129 def. Copping 8.5-53		
1966	Nubeena 17.5-107 def. Dunalley 9.13-67		
1967	Nubeena 11.12-78 def. Port Arthur 10.11-71		
1968	Port Arthur 12.11-83 def. Dunalley 10.18-78		
1969	Nubeena 15.15-105 def. Port Arthur 12.15-87		
1970	Copping 10.11-71 def. Nubeena 7.12-54		
1971	Nubeena 25.14-164 def. Port Arthur 22.15-147		
1972	Copping 16.14-110 def. Port Arthur 15.13-103	Dunalley	
1973	Copping 13.15-93 def. Dunalley 13.11-89	Dunalley	
1974	Dunalley 16.22-118 def. Nubeena 11.7-63	Dunalley	
1975	Copping 18.28-136 def. Dunalley 7.8-50	Copping	
1976	Dunalley 10.16-76 def. Copping 7.10-52	Dunalley	
1977	Dunalley 5.17-47 def. Nubeena 5.4-34	Dunalley	
1978	Copping 14.14-88 def. Nubeena 10.9-69	Copping	
1979	Dodges Ferry 19.16-130 def. Nubeena 5.5-35	Dodges Ferry def. Copping	
1980	Dodges Ferry 16.15-111 def. Mangalore 16.10-106	Dodges Ferry	
1981	Dunalley 11.17-83 def. Dodges Ferry 9.10-64	Triabunna	
1982	Dunalley 18.14-122 def. Triabunna 15.8-98	Triabunna	
1983	Triabunna 14.15-99 def. Dunalley 3.3-21	Triabunna def. Dodges Ferry	
1984	Dodges Ferry 19.11-125 def. Triabunna 11.17-83	Triabunna	
1985	Triabunna 27.12-174 def. Dodges Ferry 10.14-74	Triabunna	
1986	Tribaunna 18.13-121 def. Dodges Ferry 15.10-100	Rokeby	
1987	Triabunna 26.13-169 def. Rokeby 10.9-69	Triabunna	
1988	Triabunna 9.10-64 def. Dunalley 5.11-41	Triabunna	
1989	Dodges Ferry 18.13-121 def, Dunalley 9.10-64	Dunalley def. Dodges Ferry	Campania
1990	Dodges Ferry 16.12-108 def. Dunalley 9.10-64	Dunalley	Dodges Ferry
1991	Dodges Ferry 18.9-117 def. North Derwent 11.5-71	Dodges Ferry	Triabunna
1992	Triabunna 15.8-98 def. Richmond 15.5-95	Richmond	Richmond
1993	Richmond 12.9-81 def. Cambridge 10.10-70	Richmond	Cambridge
1994	Richmond 27.9-171 def. Campania 14.6-90	Richmond	
1995	Richmond 16.11-107 def. Triabunna 8.7-55	Richmond	
1996	Richmond 13.20-98 def. Swansea 9.2-62	North Derwent	
1997	Triabunna 20.13-133 def. Swansea 11.7-73	Richmond	
1998	North Derwent 11.15-81 def. Swansea 9.9-63	Richmond def. North Derwent	
1999	Swansea 17.16-118 def. Dodges Ferry 11.9-75	Dodges Ferry def. Swansea	
2000	Richmond 11.11-77 def. Triabunna 6.11-47	Swansea def. Dodges Ferry	
2001	Swansea 28.13-181 def. Dodges Ferry 9.13-67	Dodges Ferry def. Swansea	

== See also ==
- Australian rules football in Tasmania
- Southern Football League (Tasmania)
- Oatlands District Football Association
- Dodges Ferry Sharks
