= Peninsula Football Association =

- Founded: 1988
- Folded: 2001
- No. of teams: 4

The Peninsula Football Association (PFA) is a former non-professional Australian Rules football league from south-eastern Tasmania, Australia that operated between 1988 and 2001.

== Peninsula Football Association ==
The Peninsula Football Association was formed in 1988 after the withdrawal of the Nubeena Football Club from the Tasman Football Association.

The competition was among four clubs (Eaglehawk Neck, Nubeena, Port Arthur and Premaydena) and was completely amateur, umpired by players and former players, it also had no affiliation with any other senior football body within the State.
There were only two grounds in the competition (Nubeena and the Port Arthur Recreation Ground), therefore there were weekly double-headers at the host ground.
Originally there were only three clubs but Eaglehawk Neck were formed in 1989 at the Lufra Hotel at Eaglehawk Neck and were admitted into the Association that season.
The clubs' colours were: Nubeena (Black & Gold), Port Arthur (Maroon & White), Premaydena (Red & Black) and Eaglehawk Neck (Navy Blue with white "CFC" monogram).
The best and fairest player in the Peninsula Football Association was awarded the A.V Noye Medal, whilst the premiership winner was awarded the A.V Noye Memorial Shield.
The Peninsula Football Association went into recess and promptly folded at the end of the 2001 season when the Premaydena Football Club's ongoing battle to find players became too great and the club folded.
As a result of the competition going out of business, all member clubs also closed down.

== Clubs ==
| Club | Colours | Nickname | Est | Years in PFA | PFA Senior Premierships | |
| Club | Colours | Nickname | Est | Years in PFA | Total | Premiership Years |
|---|---|---|---|---|---|---|
| Eaglehawk Neck | | Coutas | 1989 | 1989-2001 | 4 | 1993, 1996, 2000, 2001 |
| Nubeena | | Tigers | 1892 | 1988-2001 | 7 | 1988, 1989, 1991, 1992, 1995, 1997, 1998 |
| Premaydena | | Robins | 1988 | 1988-2001 | 1 | 1999 |
| Port Arthur | | Roos | 1902 | 1988-2001 | 2 | 1990, 1994 |

== Premiers ==
- 1988 - Nubeena 14.15 (99) d Port Arthur 9.8 (62)
- 1989 - Nubeena 13.7 (85) d Port Arthur 11.11 (77)
- 1990 - Port Arthur 17.14 (116) d Eaglehawk Neck 6.8 (44)
- 1991 - Nubeena 16.13 (109) d Premaydena 5.11 (41)
- 1992 - Nubeena 19.24 (138) d Port Arthur 13.12 (90)
- 1993 - Eaglehawk Neck 20.12 (132) d Nubeena 5.4 (34)
- 1994 - Port Arthur 15.8 (98) d Eaglehawk Neck 5.13 (43)
- 1995 - Nubeena 14.13 (97) d Eaglehawk Neck 9.12 (66)
- 1996 - Eaglehawk Neck 9.8 (62) d Port Arthur 5.6 (36)
- 1997 - Nubeena 13.10 (88) d Eaglehawk Neck 8.7 (55)
- 1998 - Nubeena 14.11 (95) d Premaydena 7.11 (53)
- 1999 - Premaydena 12.9 (81) d Nubeena 4.13 (37)
- 2000 - Eaglehawk Neck 15.10 (100) d Nubeena 14.7 (91)
- 2001 - Eaglehawk Neck 14.20 (104) d Port Arthur 11.4 (70)

== Published books ==
- Australian Rules football in Tasmania - John Stoward - 2002, ISBN 0-9577515-7-5
- More on football - B.T.(Buck) Anderton - Central Coast Courier, 2002, ISBN 0-9581306-0-4
