= South East District Football Association =

Australian rules football league

- Most recent season or competition: 1979
- Sport: Australian rules football
- Founded: 1945
- First season: 1945
- Folded: 1979
- No. of teams: 7 (1979), 14 (historical)
- Country: Australia
- Last champion: Mangalore (1979)
- Most titles: Mangalore (13)
- Related competitions: Southern Districts FA

The South East District Football Association was an Australian rules football competition based in southern Tasmania.

== History ==
The South East District Football Association was formed in 1945 with Bagdad, Campania, Richmond and Sorell as the inaugural clubs. The following season saw Colebrook and Kempton re-form and join the league, as well as Mangalore who played merged with Bagdad. Bagdad-Mangalore departed for the Southern Districts FA in 1947. Forcett joined from the Pembroke FA in 1949, however had their affiliation with the SEDFA cancelled in August after their delegates walked out of a hearing. The club had won an appeal against a decision to dock them points for playing a wrongly registered player, but their delegates had walked out of the meeting as they felt the chairman's treatment of the player involved was unreasonable. Sorell also left the league after 1949 and the two clubs were replaced by Parattah and Bagdad, who had split from Mangalore. Mangalore themselves would rejoin in 1952, replacing Parattah. They would go on to dominate the 1950s, winning 6 premierships, including 4 in a row from 1954-1957.

The SEDFA remained relatively stable during the 1960s. Triabunna and Sorell had both joined from the East Coast FA in the late 1950s. Sorell won three flags in a row from 1960-62 before departing for the TAFL Southern Division. Cambridge played between 1963 and 1967, and Campania entered recess in 1965 before returning in 1968. The early 1970s saw significant change to the line-up of clubs. The Southern Districts FA folded after 1970 and 3 of its 4 clubs - Bothwell, Maydena and Upper Derwent - joined the SDFA. The Midlands FA folded a year later, with Tunnack joining from there in 1972 and Oatlands two years later. Long-time members Colebrook and Kempton both departed for the Oatlands District FA in 1974. By 1979 the competition had only 7 clubs, which saw it disband after the season. Richmond and Campania merged and the remaining clubs dispersed amongst a number of local leagues.

== Clubs ==
=== Final ===
Club	Colours	Nickname	Home Ground	Former League	Est.	Years in SEDFA	SEDFA Senior Premierships		Fate
Club	Colours	Nickname	Home Ground	Former League	Est.	Years in SEDFA	Total	Years	Fate
Bothwell		Rabbits	Bothwell Recreation Reserve, Bothwell	SDFA	1880	1971-1979	0	-	Moved to Southern Tasmanian FA in 1980
Campania		Wallabies	Campania Recreation Reserve, Campania	SMFA	1882	1945-1965, 1968-1979	4	1949, 1950, 1953, 1963	Merged with Richmond to form Richmond-Campania in TAFL Southern Division in 1980
Mangalore (Bagdad-Mangalore Rovers 1946)	(1952)(?-1979)	Robins	Pontville Oval, Pontville	SMFA, SDFA	1885	1946, 1952-1979	13	1952, 1954, 1955, 1956, 1957, 1959, 1965, 1968, 1970, 1971, 1972, 1977, 1979	Played in Southern Districts FA 1947-51. Moved to Tasman FA in 1980
Richmond	(1945-?(?-1979)	Blues	Richmond War Memorial Oval, Richmond	SDFA	1878	1945-1979	9	1945, 1946, 1947, 1951, 1958, 1964, 1974, 1977, 1979	Merged with Campania to form Richmond-Campania in TAFL Southern Division in 1980
Triabunna		Roos	Triabunna Recreation Ground, Triabunna	ECFA	1900	1959-1979	1	1967	Moved to Tasman FA in 1980
Tunnack		Eagles	Tunnack Football Oval, Tunnack	MFA	1910	1972-1979	1	1973	Moved to Oatlands District FA in 1980
Upper Derwent			Gretna Football Ground, Gretna	SDFA	1904	1971-1979	1	1975	Moved to Southern Tasmanian FA in 1980

=== Former ===
Club	Colours	Nickname	Home Ground	Former League	Est.	Years in SEDFA	SEDFA Senior Premierships		Fate
Club	Colours	Nickname	Home Ground	Former League	Est.	Years in SEDFA	Total	Years	Fate
Bagdad			Bagdad Football Ground, Bagdad	RFA	1920	1945, 1950-1975	0	-	Merged with Mangalore to form Bagdad-Mangalore Rovers in 1946. Folded after 1975 season
Cambridge		Magpies	Cambridge Memorial Oval, Cambridge	TFA	1885	1963-1967	0	-	Moved to AYC in 1968
Colebrook		Saints	Colebrook Oval, Colebrook	SMFA	1888	1946-1973	1	1948, 1969	Moved to Oatlands District FA in 1974
Forcett			Forcett Recreation Ground, Forcett	PFA	1884	1949	0	-	Had affiliation cancelled during 1949 season. Joined Clarence Sub-District FA in 1950.
Kempton		Magpies	Kempton Oval, Kempton	SMFA	1864	1946-1973	1	1966	Moved to Oatlands District FA in 1974
Maydena-Strathgordon (Maydena 1971-72)	(1971-?)(?-1974)	Bulldogs	Maydena Sports Ground, Maydena	SDFA	1952	1971-1974	0	-	Moved to AYC in 1975
Oatlands		Tigers	Oatlands Oval, Oatlands	TAFLS	1879	1974-1977	0	-	Moved to Oatlands District FA in 1978
Ouse		Magpies	Ouse Recreation Ground, Ouse	SDFA	1935	1971-1975	0	-	Folded after 1975 season
Parattah		Robins	Parattah Oval, Parattah	PT	1884	1950-1951	0	-	Formed Oatlands District FA in 1952
Sorell		Magpies	Sorell Memorial Oval, Sorell	PFA, ECFA	1883	1945-1949, 1956-1962	3	1960, 1961, 1962	Moved to Clarence Sub-District FA in 1950. Moved to TAFL Southern Division in 1963

== Premierships ==
Year	Premier	Score	Runners-up	Notes
1945	Richmond	2.12 (24) - 1.3 (9)	Bagdad-Mangalore Rovers	
1946	Richmond	8.10 (58) - 3.8 (26)	Bagdad-Mangalore Rovers	
1947	Richmond	6.8 (44) - 3.8 (26)	Kempton	
1948	Colebrook	9.15 (69) - 8.10 (58)	Campania	
1949	Campania	9.14 (68) - 4.10 (34)	Colebrook	
1950	Campania		Colebrook	
1951	Richmond	9.10 (64) - 5.10 (40)	Kempton	
1952	Mangalore	8.14 (62) - 8.10 (58)	Richmond	
1953	Campania	10.9 (69) - 3.8 (26)	Richmond	
1954	Mangalore	8.14 (62) - 6.8 (44)	Campania	
1955	Mangalore	8.9 (57) - 7.6 (48)	Richmond	
1956	Mangalore	11.15 (81) - 5.10 (40)	Campania	
1957	Mangalore	8.10 (58) - 6.7 (43)	Colebrook	
1958	Richmond	7.19 (61) - 6.5 (41)	Colebrook	
1959	Mangalore	9.9 (63) - 9.9 (63)	Sorell	Drawn grand final
1959	Mangalore		Sorell	Replay
1960	Sorell	14.10 (94) - 11.10 (76)	Mangalore	
1961	Sorell	11.12 (78) - 7.13 (55)	Campania	
1962	Sorell	13.9 (87) - 12.9 (81)	Campania	
1963	Campania	11.8 (74) - 10.10 (70)	Mangalore	
1964	Richmond	9.6 (60) - 5.17 (47)	Kempton	
1965	Mangalore	10.10 (70) - 7.12 (54)	Cambridge	
1966	Kempton	11.7 (73) - 8.11 (59)	Mangalore	
1967	Triabunna	9.11 (65) - 5.10 (40)	Mangalore	
1968	Mangalore	10.12 (72) - 10.11 (71)	Triabunna	
1969	Colebrook	8.13 (61) - 8.10 (58)	Mangalore	
1970	Mangalore	14.22 (106) - 14.6 (90)	Campania	
1971	Mangalore	13.11 (89) - 12.9 (81)	Triabunna	
1972	Mangalore	18.11 (119) - 13.11 (89)	Tunnack	
1973	Tunnack	12.17 (89) - 8.10 (58)	Mangalore	
1974	Richmond	12.11 (83) - 6.4 (40)	Bothwell	
1975	Upper Derwent	13.18 (96) - 14.8 (92)	Mangalore	
1976	Richmond	14.19 (103) - 12.11 (83)	Upper Derwent	
1977	Mangalore	20.16 (136) - 9.11 (65)	Campania	
1978	Richmond	18.13 (121) - 11.9 (75)	Mangalore	
1979	Mangalore	17.17 (119) - 6.6 (42)	Campania	
