= Tasmanian University Football Club =

Australian football club associated with the University of Tasmania

TUFC

Names
- Full name: Tasmania University Football Club
- Nickname: Rainbows

2020 season
- After finals: 3rd

Club details
- Founded: 1930s
- Competition: Old Scholars Football Association.

Tasmania University Football Club (TUFC) is an Australian football club associated with the University of Tasmania. The Club currently plays in the Old Scholars Football Association.

The club was established in the 1936 but did not participate in an organised competition until the late 1940s when it played in the Tasmanian Amateur Football League's southern division.

Tasmania born sports journalist and author Martin Flanagan played for the Tasmania University Football Club.
