= Oatlands District Football Association =

- Formerly: Oatlands District Football Competition
- Founded: 1952
- No. of teams: 6

The Oatlands District Football Association (ODFA) is a non-professional Australian rules football league located in Tasmania, Australia.

== Oatlands District Football Association origins: 1952–1999 ==
On Monday 24 March 1952 a meeting was held at the Parattah Hotel, with the aim being to form a local football competition, the meeting was attended by representatives from Tunbridge, Woodsdale and Parattah.
When the competition was formed it aimed to give players of the Oatlands Municipality, who could not be absorbed into the Midlands Football Association, an opportunity to play football.
The three clubs affiliated with the Oatlands District Football Competition, and football commenced on 19 April 1952, with Woodsdale defeating Parattah 3.7 (25) to 2.3 (15).
Parattah's coach for the first season was Max Kelly, Tunbridge had Ken Gourlay in charge, and Cyril Payne was the first ever coach of Woodsdale.
Tunbridge had the distinction of winning the first premiership.
Mr Ron Rowlands of Woodsdale donated the first shield, which was to be retained by the club gaining the most match points at the end of three years, it was appropriately won by Woodsdale in 1954 with 138 points, although they had not yet won a premiership.
The late Max Fergusson of Parattah was the first President/Chairman of the competition, and the first Secretary/Treasurer was the late Alan Payne of Woodsdale.
In 1953, Mt.Pleasant affiliated, making an even number of teams in the competition.

The Association did not affiliate with any parent body until 1955, when it affiliated with the Tasmanian Football League.
In sympathy with a number of other country football associations, and because it believed it was right thing to do, the Association became unaffiliated and joined the Southern Tasmanian Country Football Council in 1960. The ODFA re-affiliated with the TFL in 1971 and remained so until the TFL collapsed after the 2000 season.

In 1955, it was decided to change the name of the body to the Oatlands District Football Association.
The first lightning premiership was conducted by the Association in 1955 at Parattah, resulting in a draw between Woodsdale and Tunbridge, each scoring 4.2 (26).
The first tribunal meeting was held on the 19 August 1952 after an umpires' report was lodged with Max Burns of Parattah and Clyde Hart of Tunbridge found guilty of striking each other and were stood down for two roster matches.

The Association decided in 1956 the teams in the Association field 16 players a side, and this policy was retained until 1977, when it was increased to eighteen players and two interchange players.
In 1957 the late Mr H.M Jones was elected President/Chairman, and in the same year, the late Ron Bean of Tunbridge was elected Secretary/Treasurer, a position he held for 30 years, Ron had attended all but two meetings of the Association between 1953 and 1977.
In recognition of Mr Bean's service to the Association he was made a Life Member in 1971.
The late Mr H.M Jones donated the second shield in 1955, which was to be won by the team winning 3 titles since then, this was won by Woodsdale in 1959.
It was decided in 1959 that the premiership team in the Association be presented with a pennant, a practice the Association continues to this day.
In 1992, the ODFA decided it would provide medallions for the players of the Premiership teams.
In 1970, discussions commenced between the Midlands Football Association, which consisted of Oatlands, Tunnack, Ross and Campbell Town, and the ODFA with regards to the possibility of a merger because of dwindling population from country areas.
These discussions did not come to any definite arrangements, and the Midlands Football Association went into recess in 1971.

The ODFA remained unchanged until 1974, when Kempton and Colebrook were admitted to the Association, both previously from the South Eastern District Football Association, making six teams.
William Dunbabin became the second life member of the Association, as Mr Dunbabin served many years as President/Chairman of the Association.
The following year, Ray Johnson and Jeff Doddridge were made Life Members, and Colebrook won the flag, their one and only.
In 1978, Association name-sake team Oatlands was admitted, the first team from the old Midlands Football Association, at the end of 1978, Colebrook went into recess, the first club to go into recess at the time.
In 1980, ex-Midlands Football Association clubs Ross and Tunnack were admitted, making eight teams, until January 1982, when original club Tunbridge went into recess.

In 1986, Lou Bisdee was made the fifth Life Member of the Association. In the same year, the ODFA gained its first sponsorship, from Tasmanian Breweries (Cascade for the Association and affiliated clubs).
In 1987, the late Ron Bean retired from the position of Secretary/Treasurer, after 30 years to the Association, Ian McElwee of Kempton was appointed Secretary, and Gwenda Cowle of Buckland was appointed Treasurer.
In the same year, the Parattah Football Club went into recess, and Bothwell was admitted to the Association, from the Southern Tasmanian Football Association (not related to the STFA that became the TFL).

In 1988, Ian McElwee resigned as Secretary, and Helen Scott of Woodsdale was appointed Secretary – Mrs Scott is the daughter of the late Ron Bean.
The year 1988 was two more firsts for the Association – the commencement of the Reserves Football Competition, following increased pressure from Kempton, as they had far too many players for only one side.
This caused friction for extremely rural clubs, Mount Pleasant and Woodsdale, and at times Ross, due to the fact that attracting 60 players to the club can prove difficult.
The year 1994 almost saw the end of the reserves, as the three above clubs didn't field reserves sides.
The other first for 1988 was the commencement of the Annual End of Season Dinner and Trophy Presentation, which were held at a variety of locations.
In 1989, Colebrook was re-admitted to the Association, again making it an eight team competition.

On 6 October 1990, Ron Rowlands of Woodsdale was made the sixth Life Member of the Association.
In the same year, the ODFA Secretary completed the work necessary for the Association to become an Incorporated Association.
In 1991, the TANFL Umpires Association pulled the pin on sending umpires to the ODFA (and Tasman Football Association), in turn, the ODFA formed its own Umpires Association, which affiliated with the TFL, and was recognised by the AFL.
In Round 2 1993, Woodsdale kicked 77.29 (491) to Colebrook's 0.1 (1) which still stands as a Tasmanian record score.

On 30 September 1994, Owen Davis, formerly of Ross, then living in Launceston was made the seventh Life Member of the Association.
In January 1995, the Colebrook Football Club went into recess, leaving a seven-team competition, with all clubs fielding reserves.
In 1996 due to the declining number of umpires, the Association disbanded its Umpiring Association, and umpires were sought from the Southern Umpires Association.

In 1998 it became compulsory for clubs wishing to affiliate with the ODFA to field both a Senior and Reserves team, with strict rules pertaining to forfeiture of matches being implemented.
On 10 October 1998, at its Annual General Meeting, both Helen Scott and Gwenda Cowle were made Life Members of the Association with the special guest on the night being the late Premier of Tasmania, the Honorable Jim Bacon MHA.
After 1999, the Association saw numerous seasons of chopping and changing teams due to the harsh economic realities of life in country regions, Woodsdale, Ross and Tunnack dropped out.

== Summer of 2005–2006 ==
The biggest change came at the end of the 2005 season when Oatlands, Kempton and Bothwell decided to resign from the ODFA, merge with each other and joined the SFL Regional League as the Central Hawks from 2006. Triabunna, which had joined the Association in 2001 from the now defunct Tasman Football Association, also moved to the SFL.

This left only Mount Pleasant and Swansea before Woodsdale and Ross reformed – Woodsdale had previously went into recess from the Association a few years earlier because of their inability to field a reserve side, however there is currently no reserve grade competition.

== 2007–2013 Competition expands ==
2007 saw Campania Football Club be reformed and join the ODFA making the association a 5-team competition.

During the 2008 season, Ross were expelled from the association due to disciplinary problems involving the club.

In 2009 the competition saw the addition of former NTFA Division Two club Campbell Town to replace Ross. At the end of 2010 a group of football supporters formed the Tasman Peninsula Football Club which entered the competition in the 2011 season. Even though they did not win a game they came close on several occasions and drew with Woodsdale at Nubeena.

In September 2012 Bothwell split from its merger of the Central Hawks. As a club spokesman said There has only been two games a season in Bothwell. We had sort of lost the community aspect of the club so it was decided last September the club would try to re-form. This ignored the fact that 2 games were moved after the local council closed the ground after bad weather, something not controlled by the Central Hawks

== Clubs ==
=== Locations ===
Locations of the ODFA clubs

=== Current ===
Club	Jumper	Nickname	Home Ground	Former League	Est.	Years in ODFA	ODFA Premierships	
Club	Jumper	Nickname	Home Ground	Former League	Est.	Years in ODFA	Total	Years
Bothwell		Rabbits	Bothwell Recreation Reserve, Bothwell	STFA	1880	1987-2005; 2013-	9	1989, 1997, 2005, 2016, 2017, 2018, 2022, 2024, 2025
Campania		Wallabies	Campania Recreation Reserve, Campania	TFA	1882	2007-	0	-
Mt Pleasant		Mounties	Pawtella Oval, Pawtella	MFA	1920	1953-	19	1953, 1954, 1955, 1964, 1971, 1972, 1973, 1974, 1977, 1979, 1980, 1987, 2003, 2006, 2011, 2013, 2014, 2019, 2021
Oatlands		Tigers	Oatlands Oval, Oatlands	SEDFA	1879	1978-2005, 2014-2019, 2022-	6	1978, 1981, 1983, 1984, 1988, 2015
Triabunna		Roos	Triabunna Recreation Ground, Triabunna	TFA, SFL	1900	2001-2005, 2016-	2	2002, 2023
Woodsdale		Lions	Wallaby Park, Woodsdale	PT	1902	1952-2002, 2003-2015, 2022-	22	1956, 1957, 1959, 1960, 1963, 1964, 1967, 1986, 1990, 1991, 1992, 1993, 1995, 1996, 1998, 1999, 2000, 2001, 2008, 2009, 2010, 2012

== Current coaches ==
- Mount Pleasant Football Club – Zac Webster
- Triabunna Football Club – Ben Van Kraanen
- Woodsdale Football Club – Matthew Crawford
- Campania Football Club – Julian Sturzaker
- Bothwell Football Club – Bradley Chaplin
- Oatlands Football Club – Adam McCarthy

== Former clubs ==
Club	Jumper	Nickname	Home Ground	Former League	Est.	Years in ODFA	ODFA Premierships		Fate
Club	Jumper	Nickname	Home Ground	Former League	Est.	Years in ODFA	Total	Years	Fate
Campbell Town		Robins	Campbell Town Oval, Campbell Town	NTFA	1886	2009-2024	0	-	Returned to Northern Tasmanian FA in 2025
Colebrook		Saints	Colebrook Oval, Colebrook	SEDFA	1888	1974-1978, 1989-1994	1	1975	Entered recess in 1979, re-formed in 1989, folded after 1994 season
Kempton		Magpies	Kempton Oval, Kempton	SEDFA	1864	1974-2003	3	1976, 1982, 1994	Merged with Bothwell and Oatlands to form Central Hawks in SFL in 2004
Parattah		Robins	Parattah Oval, Parattah	SEDFA	1884	1952-1986	4	1961, 1962, 1965, 1969	Folded after 1986 season
Ross		Demons	Ross Recreation Ground, Ross	EFA	1878	1980-2000, 2006-2008	1	1985	Entered recess in 2001. Kicked out of league due to disciplinary issues after 2008 season.
Swansea		Swans	Swansea Oval, Swansea	TFA	1890s	2002-2020	2	2004, 2007	Folded after 2020 season
Tasman Peninsula (Peninsula Power 2011-12)	(2011–12)(2013–17)	Crows	Buckland Park, Buckland; Nubeena Recreation Ground, Nubeena and Dunalley Recreation Reserve, Dunalley	–	2011	2011-2017	0	-	Folded after 2017 season
Tunbridge		Redlegs	Tunbridge Oval, Tunbridge	PT	1895	1952-1981	5	1952, 1958, 1966, 1968, 1970	Folded after 1981 season
Tunnack		Eagles	Tunnack Football Oval, Tunnack	SEDFA	1910	1980-2001	0	-	Folded after 2001 season

== ODFA Best and Fairest Medal Winners ==
- 1954 – Roy Webb (Woodsdale)
- 1955 – Len Kline (Woodsdale)
- 1956 – Kevin Bowerman (Tunbridge)
- 1957 – Gordon Groves (Parattah)
- 1958 – David Carnes (Tunbridge)
- 1959 – Geoff White (Tunbridge)
- 1960 – Ross Saville (Parattah)
- 1961 – Ritchie Dransfield (Tunbridge) & Kevin Bailey (Parattah)
- 1962 – Roger Barwick (Mount Pleasant)
- 1963 – Roger Barwick (Mount Pleasant)
- 1964 – Keith Carnes (Mount Pleasant)
- 1965 – Leo Graham (Woodsdale)
- 1966 – John Fitzallen (Tunbridge)
- 1967 – Kevin Bailey (Parattah)
- 1968 – Roger Dean (Woodsdale)
- 1969 – Noel Siely (Tunbridge)
- 1970 – Noel Siely (Tunbridge)
- 1971 – Sam Foster (Parattah)
- 1972 – Roger Barwick (Mount Pleasant)
- 1973 – Neville Barwick (Mount Pleasant)
- 1974 – William Webster (Tunbridge)
- 1975 – Ned Toomey (Tunbridge)
- 1976 – Ned Toomey (Tunbridge)
- 1977 – Harry Williams (Kempton)
- 1978 – Len Kamerach (Parattah)
- 1979 – Michael Lang (Kempton)
- 1980 – Gavin Roberts (Tunnack)
- 1981 – Anthony Green (Oatlands)
- 1982 – Gavin Roberts (Tunnack)
- 1983 – Gavin Roberts (Tunnack)
- 1984 – Mark Travers (Woodsdale)
- 1985 – Mark Travers (Woodsdale)
- 1986 – Michael Mason (Woodsdale)
- 1987 – Ned Toomey (Ross)
- 1988 – Peter Thorpe (Ross)
- 1989 – Kevin Watson (Woodsdale)
- 1990 – Peter Thorpe (Ross)
- 1991 – John Saunders (Bothwell)
- 1992 – Wayne Hogan (Colebrook)
- 1993 – Gavin Roberts (Tunnack)
- 1994 – Peter Thorpe (Ross)
- 1995 – Andrew Scott (Woodsdale)
- 1996 – Peter Thorpe (Tunnack)
- 1997 – Paul Byers (Mount Pleasant)
- 1998 – Roger Belcher (Mount Pleasant)
- 1999 – Jarrod Oates (Tunnack)
- 2000 – Rodney Cowle (Woodsdale)
- 2001 – Leigh Taylor (Triabunna)
- 2002 – Nathan Barwick (Mt Pleasant), Luke Goodsell (Oatlands) & Gavin Branch (Bothwell) in 3-way tie
- 2003 – Damien Triffitt (Bothwell)
- 2004 – Tim Blanden (Swansea)
- 2005 – Scott Brazendale (Bothwell)
- 2006 – Jamie Robson (Mt Pleasant)
- 2007 – Daniel Davis (Woodsdale)
- 2008 – Rodney Cowle (Woodsdale)
- 2009 – Tim Gordon (Swansea) and Trent Wiggins (Woodsdale) in a tie
- 2010 – Trent Graham (Woodsdale)
- 2011 – Nathan Barwick (Mt Pleasant)
- 2012 – Nathan Ross (Woodsdale)
- 2013 – Sam Hills (Swansea)
- 2014 – Scott Bone (Mt Pleasant)
- 2015 – Simon Bryant (Bothwell)
- 2016 – Alex Downie (Campbell Town)
- 2017 – Alex Langridge (Campbell Town)
- 2018 – Jarrod Kaye (Triabunna)
- 2019 – Matthew Triffett (Campania)
- 2020 - No competition due to Covid-19 pandemic
- 2021 - Justin Brown (Bothwell)
- 2022 - Jamie Sokolski (Bothwell)
- 2023 - Corey Bosworth (Campbell Town)
- 2024 - Brendan Klok (Triabunna)
- 2025 - Darryn Westcott (Campania)
- 2026 - Thomas Birchall (Mt Pleasant)

== ODFA Under 21 Best and Fairest Medal Winners ==
- 1982 - Paul Gangell (Tunnack)
- 1983 - Cary Millhouse (Ross)
- 1984 - Matthew Bryan (Mt Pleasant)
- 1985 - John Webb (Oatlands)
- 1986 - Matthew Groves (Mt Pleasant)
- 1987 - Andrew Scott (Tunnack)
- 1988 - Warren Wylie (Kempton)
- 1989 - Michael Figg (Oatlands)
- 1990 - Bruce Rowlands (Woodsdale)
- 1991 - Graeme Rowlands (Woodsdale)
- 1992 - Wayne Hogan (Colebrook)
- 1993 - Dean Clark (Kempton) and Graeme Rowlands (Woodsdale) in a tie
- 1994 - Scott Wilson (Woodsdale)
- 1995 - Andrew Scott (Woodsdale)
- 1996 - Andrew Scott (Woodsdale)
- 1997 - Todd Parsell (Oatlands)
- 1998 - Roger Belcher (Mt Pleasant)
- 1999 - Jason Farrelly (Ross)
- 2000 - Damien Harwood (Mt Pleasant)
- 2001 - Leigh Taylor (Triabunna)
- 2002 - Nathan Barwick (Mt Pleasant) and Luke Goodsell (Oatlands) in a tie
- 2003 - Nathan Barwick (Mt Pleasant)
- 2004 - Justin Myers (Oatlands)
- 2005 - Trent Graham (Triabunna)
- 2006 - Trent Graham (Woodsdale)
- 2007 - Chris Hay (Swansea)
- 2008 - Josh Monks (Woodsdale)
- 2009 - Josh Monks (Woodsdale)
- 2010 - Jordan Broughton (Campania)
- 2011 - Alex Tatnell (Swansea)
- 2012 - Nathan Ross (Woodsdale)
- 2013 - Rhys Giffard (Swansea)
- 2014 - Nathan Pennicott (Oatlands)
- 2015 - Brock Nichols (Bothwell)
- 2016 - Jarrod Kaye (Triabunna)
- 2017 - Ryan Sweet (Triabunna)
- 2018 - Jarrod Kaye (Triabunna)
- 2019 - Thomas Birchall (Mt Pleasant)
- 2020 - No competition due to Covid-19 pandemic
- 2021 - Rohan Barwick (Mt Pleasant), Mitchell Byers (Mt Pleasant) and Jayden Wilton (Bothwell) in 3-way tie
- 2022 - Blair McGillvery (Campbell Town)
- 2023 - Jamie Devine (Woodsdale)
- 2024 - Caleb Mayne (Bothwell)
- 2025 - Riley Robson (Mt Pleasant)
- 2026 - Brodie Speed (Bothwell)

== ODFA Leading goalkicker award ==
- 1954 Cyril Payne (Woodsdale) - 64
- 1955 Cyril Payne (Woodsdale) - 69
- 1956 Cyril Payne (Woodsdale) - 75
- 1957 Cyril Payne (Woodsdale) - 108
- 1958 Cyril Payne (Woodsdale) -
- 1959 Keith Carnes (Mt Pleasant) -
- 1960 Barry Geard (Parattah) - 100
- 1961 Graeme Wighton (Parattah) - 87
- 1962 Leon Scott (Woodsdale) - 32
- 1963 Barry Smith (Mt Pleasant) - 44
- 1964 Leon Scott (Woodsdale) - 70
- 1965 Terry Wilson (Parattah) - 75
- 1966 Graeme Scott (Woodsdale) - 59
- 1967 Graeme Scott (Woodsdale) - 47
- 1968 Greg Bennetts (Tunbridge) - 35
- 1969 Neville Barwick (Mt Pleasant) - 54
- 1970 Neville Barwick (Mt Pleasant) - 54
- 1971 Roger Barwick (Mt Pleasant) - 76
- 1972 Neville Barwick (Mt Pleasant) - 73
- 1973 Neville Barwick (Mt Pleasant) - 121
- 1974 Neville Barwick (Mt Pleasant) - 88
- 1975 Roger Barwick (Mt Pleasant) and Leon Scott (Woodsdale) - 86 in a tie
- 1976 Roger Barwick (Mt Pleasant) - 100
- 1977 Michael Lang (Kempton) - 63
- 1978 Michael Lang (Kempton) - 95
- 1979 Michael Lang (Kempton) - 75
- 1980 Michael Lang (Kempton) - 87
- 1981 Michael Lang (Kempton) - 102
- 1982 Michael Lang (Kempton) - 110
- 1983 Ray McDonald (Ross) - 91
- 1984 Michael Worker (Parattah) - 102
- 1985 Kerry Palmer (Woodsdale) - 105
- 1986 Kerry Palmer (Woodsdale) - 105
- 1987 Michael Lang (Kempton) - 111
- 1988 Steve Wilson (Kempton) - 91
- 1989 Kerry Wilton (Bothwell) - 130
- 1990 Tony Adams (Bothwell) - 81
- 1991 Neil Harper (Mt Pleasant) - 107
- 1992 Darren Crowe (Woodsdale) - 94
- 1993 Ray Daly (Kempton) - 131 (Association Record)
- 1994 Greg Plunkett (Kempton) - 67
- 1995 Brett Carr (Kempton) - 66
- 1996 Ross Triffitt (Bothwell) - 107
- 1997 Ross Triffitt (Bothwell) - 111
- 1998 Andrew Dean (Woodsdale) - 82
- 1999 Graeme Rowlands (Woodsdale) - 74
- 2000 Nathan Bennett (Woodsdale) - 109
- 2001 Matthew Heawood (Bothwell) - 83
- 2002 Matthew Heawood (Bothwell) - 100
- 2003 Patrick Cusick (Swansea) - 84
- 2004 Damien Wilson (Mt Pleasant) - 63
- 2005 Mark Kamaric (Oatlands) - 60
- 2006 John Rainbird (Mt Pleasant) - 101
- 2007 John Rainbird (Mt Pleasant) - 85
- 2008 Shane Cowen (Swansea) - 70
- 2009 Shane Cowen (Swansea) - 84
- 2010 Charles Jones (Campania) - 68
- 2011 Tim Gordon (Campbell Town) - 105
- 2012 Matthew Wilson (Mt Pleasant) - 74
- 2013 Adrian Burdon (Campania) - 90
- 2014 Richard Newton (Bothwell) - 91
- 2015 Will Archer (Campbell Town) - 70
- 2016 Kris Cashion (Bothwell) - 108
- 2017 Clinton Curtain (Campania) - 124
- 2018 Clinton Curtain (Campania) - 118
- 2019 Clinton Curtain (Campania) - 58
- 2020 No competition due to Covid-19 pandemic
- 2021 Nicholas Clark (Triabunna) - 47
- 2022 David Cragg (Campania) - 81
- 2023 Joel Hazelwood (Mt Pleasant) - 51
- 2024 Clinton Curtain (Bothwell) - 56
- 2025 Caleb Triffitt (Bothwell) - 97

== ODFA Grand Finals: 1952–present ==
- 1952 – Tunbridge 16.6 (102) d Parattah 9.8 (62) – Parattah Oval.
- 1953 – Mount Pleasant 9.17 (71) d Tunbridge 7.5 (47) – Parattah Oval.
- 1954 – Mount Pleasant 9.7 (61) d Woodsdale 8.10 (58) – Parattah Oval.
- 1955 – Mount Pleasant 18.24 (132) d Parattah 7.12 (54) – Tunbridge Oval.
- 1956 – Woodsdale 12.6 (78) d Mount Pleasant 6.8 (44) – Parattah Oval.
- 1957 – Woodsdale 8.8 (56) d Tunbridge 1.7 (13) – Parattah Oval.
- 1958 – Tunbridge 16.18 (114) d Woodsdale 11.4 (70) – Parattah Oval.
- 1959 – Woodsdale 10.15 (75) d Tunbridge 4.10 (34) – Parattah Oval.
- 1960 – Woodsdale 6.12 (48) d Parattah 3.8 (26) – Parattah Oval.
- 1961 – Parattah 8.14 (62) d Mount Pleasant 6.11 (47) – Tunbridge Oval.
- 1962 – Parattah 13.17 (95) d Woodsdale 9.14 (68) – Tunbridge Oval.
- 1963 – Woodsdale 12.15 (87) dw Mount Pleasant 12.15 (87) – Parattah Oval. (Drawn Final)
- 1963 – Woodsdale 14.14 (98) d Mount Pleasant 13.7 (85) – Parattah Oval. (Replay)
- 1964 – Mount Pleasant 12.10 (82) d Woodsdale 10.9 (69) - Parattah Oval.
- 1965 – Parattah 20.18 (138) d Woodsdale 16.8 (104) – Parattah Oval.
- 1966 – Tunbridge 11.15 (81) d Woodsdale 8.11 (59) – Parattah Oval.
- 1967 – Woodsdale 16.21 (117) d Mount Pleasant 10.12 (72) – Parattah Oval.
- 1968 – Tunbridge 10.9 (69) d Parattah 7.13 (55) – Pawtella Football Ground.
- 1969 – Parattah 15.19 (109) d Tunbridge 10.13 (73) – Pawtella Football Ground.
- 1970 – Tunbridge 10.9 (69) d Mount Pleasant 7.13 (55) – Parattah Oval.
- 1971 – Mount Pleasant 18.18 (126) d Tunbridge 14.13 (97) – Parattah Oval.
- 1972 – Mount Pleasant 18.21 (129) d Woodsdale 14.15 (99) – Tunbridge Oval.
- 1973 – Mount Pleasant 20.22 (142) d Tunbridge 10.12 (72) – Parattah Oval.
- 1974 – Mount Pleasant 19.25 (139) d Parattah 6.11 (47) – Kempton Oval.
- 1975 – Colebrook 12.25 (97) d Mount Pleasant 8.13 (61) – Tunbridge Oval.
- 1976 – Kempton 15.15 (105) d Mount Pleasant 14.10 (94) – Colebrook Oval.
- 1977 – Mount Pleasant 18.20 (128) d Kempton 12.5 (77) – Colebrook Oval.
- 1978 – Oatlands 11.17 (83) d Mount Pleasant 6.11 (47) – Parattah Oval.
- 1979 – Mount Pleasant 16.16 (112) d Oatlands 9.12 (66) – Oatlands Oval.
- 1980 – Mount Pleasant 10.14 (74) d Oatlands 8.16 (64) – Oatlands Oval.
- 1981 – Oatlands 15.13 (103) d Mount Pleasant 14.10 (94) – Oatlands Oval.
- 1982 – Kempton 16.8 (104) d Oatlands 11.15 (81) – Oatlands Oval.
- 1983 – Oatlands 12.11 (83) d Ross 10.10 (70) – Oatlands Oval.
- 1984 – Oatlands 12.15 (87) d Mount Pleasant 11.13 (79) – Oatlands Oval.
- 1985 – Ross 11.19 (85) d Mount Pleasant 9.10 (64) – Oatlands Oval.
- 1986 – Woodsdale 10.12 (72) d Tunnack 8.12 (60) – Oatlands Oval.
- 1987 – Mount Pleasant 14.13 (97) d Kempton 12.16 (88) – Oatlands Oval.
- 1988 – Oatlands 11.15 (81) d Kempton 7.17 (59) – Oatlands Oval.
- 1989 – Bothwell 15.8 (98) d Woodsdale 12.8 (80) – Oatlands Oval.
- 1990 – Woodsdale 12.6 (78) d Oatlands 8.4 (52) – Oatlands Oval.
- 1991 – Woodsdale 17.13 (115) d Ross 11.9 (75) – Oatlands Oval.
- 1992 – Woodsdale 22.11 (143) d Oatlands 11.6 (72) – Oatlands Oval.
- 1993 – Woodsdale 21.13 (139) d Kempton 11.14 (80) – Oatlands Oval.
- 1994 – Kempton 24.15 (159) d Woodsdale 11.7 (73) – Oatlands Oval.
- 1995 – Woodsdale 18.19 (127) d Oatlands 5.11 (41) – Oatlands Oval.
- 1996 – Woodsdale 14.11 (95) d Kempton 12.10 (82) – Oatlands Oval.
- 1997 – Bothwell 15.16 (106) d Woodsdale 12.9 (81) – Oatlands Oval.
- 1998 – Woodsdale 31.16 (202) d Ross 12.17 (89) – Oatlands Oval.
- 1999 – Woodsdale 12.17 (89) d Mount Pleasant 4.4 (28) – Oatlands Oval.
- 2000 – Woodsdale 8.13 (61) d Kempton 8.7 (55) – Oatlands Oval.
- 2001 – Woodsdale 9.12 (66) d Kempton 8.9 (57) – Att: 2,680 at Oatlands Oval.
- 2002 – Triabunna 12.16 (88) d Bothwell 7.7 (49) – Oatlands Oval.
- 2003 – Mount Pleasant 12.6 (78) d Woodsdale 9.14 (68) – Oatlands Oval.
- 2004 – Swansea 11.6 (72) d Triabunna 8.9 (57) – Oatlands Oval.
- 2005 – Bothwell 7.10 (52) d Mount Pleasant 3.3 (21) – Att: 1,850 at Oatlands Oval.
- 2006 – Mount Pleasant 8.13 (61) d Swansea 7.6 (48) – Oatlands Oval.
- 2007 – Swansea 12.6 (78) d Woodsdale 8.10 (58) – Oatlands Oval.
- 2008 – Woodsdale 9.12 (66) d Swansea 8.3 (51) – Oatlands Oval.
- 2009 – Woodsdale 11.14 (80) d Campania 7.11 (53) – Oatlands Oval.
- 2010 – Woodsdale 11.6 (72) d Campania 9.11 (65) – Oatlands Oval
- 2011 – Mount Pleasant 10.15 (75) d Woodsdale 7.11 (53) – Oatlands Oval
- 2012 – Woodsdale 18.19 (127) d Mount Pleasant 13.6 (84) – Oatlands Oval
- 2013 – Mount Pleasant 14.11 (95) d Campania 14.9 (93) – Oatlands Oval
- 2014 – Mount Pleasant 19.21 (135) d Oatlands 5.7 (37) – Oatlands Oval
- 2015 – Oatlands 10.12 (72) d Campbell Town 8.12 (60) – Oatlands Oval
- 2016 – Bothwell 20.10 (130) d Campbell Town 6.12 (48) – Oatlands Oval
- 2017 – Bothwell 12.7 (79) d Mount Pleasant 5.9 (39) – Oatlands Oval
- 2018 – Bothwell 14.14 (98) d Campania 9.5 (59) – Oatlands Oval
- 2019 – Mount Pleasant 12.19 (91) d Campania 6.3 (39) – Oatlands Oval
- 2020 – No competition due to COVID-19 pandemic.
- 2021 – Mount Pleasant 11.12 (78) d Bothwell 11.5 (71) – Oatlands Oval
- 2022 – Bothwell 13.11 (89) d Campbell Town 7.9 (51) – Oatlands Oval
- 2023 – Triabunna 11.13 (79) d Campbell Town 10.6 (66) – Oatlands Oval
- 2024 – Bothwell 13.6 (84) d Triabunna 11.8 (74) – Oatlands Oval
- 2025 – Bothwell 11.12 (78) d Campania 8.5 (53) – Oatlands Oval

== 2016 Ladder ==
Oatlands DFA	Wins	Byes	Losses	Draws	For	Against	%	Pts	Final	Team	G	B	Pts	Team	G	B	Pts
Bothwell	17	0	1	0	2439	840	290.36%	68	Elimination	Mt Pleasant	11	11	77	Swansea	8	11	59
Campbell Town	12	0	6	0	1832	1101	166.39%	48	Qualifying	Campbell Town	12	16	88	Campania	7	6	48
Campania	11	0	7	0	1580	1351	116.95%	44	1st Semi	Mt Pleasant	13	9	87	Campania	5	6	36
Swansea	11	0	7	0	1540	1536	100.26%	44	2nd Semi	Bothwell	20	14	134	Campbell Town	10	5	65
Mt Pleasant	8	0	10	0	1395	1423	98.03%	32	Preliminary	Campbell Town	9	14	68	Mt Pleasant	9	9	63
Peninsula Power	8	0	10	0	1108	1214	91.27%	32	Grand	Bothwell	20	10	130	Campbell Town	6	12	48
Oatlands	5	0	13	0	1247	1761	70.81%	20									
Triabunna	0	0	18	0	736	2651	27.76%	0									

== 2017 Ladder ==
Oatlands DFA	Wins	Byes	Losses	Draws	For	Against	%	Pts	Final	Team	G	B	Pts	Team	G	B	Pts
Campania	17	0	2	0	2396	1038	230.83%	68	Elimination	Campbell Town	16	8	104	Oatlands	11	9	75
Bothwell	16	0	3	0	2647	883	299.77%	64	Qualifying	Mt Pleasant	11	7	73	Bothwell	6	12	48
Mt Pleasant	14	0	5	0	1954	1178	165.87%	56	1st Semi	Bothwell	16	16	112	Campbell Town	8	3	51
Campbell Town	13	0	6	0	2000	944	211.86%	52	2nd Semi	Mt Pleasant	8	9	57	Campania	5	8	38
Oatlands	8	0	11	0	1201	2163	55.52%	32	Preliminary	Bothwell	14	6	90	Campania	7	13	55
Triabunna	5	0	14	0	1185	1899	62.40%	20	Grand	Bothwell	12	7	79	Mt Pleasant	5	9	39
Peninsula Power	3	0	16	0	1031	2242	45.99%	12									
Swansea	0	0	19	0	616	2693	22.87%	0									

== 2018 Ladder ==
Oatlands DFA	Wins	Byes	Losses	Draws	For	Against	%	Pts	Final	Team	G	B	Pts	Team	G	B	Pts
Bothwell	17	0	1	0	2811	710	395.92%	68	1st Semi	Mt Pleasant	16	11	107	Oatlands	7	8	50
Campania	16	0	2	0	2453	771	318.16%	64	2nd Semi	Bothwell	14	9	93	Campania	11	10	76
Mt Pleasant	11	0	7	0	1586	1388	114.27%	44	Preliminary	Campania	18	10	118	Mt Pleasant	7	2	44
Oatlands	8	0	10	0	1260	2046	61.58%	32	Grand	Bothwell	14	14	98	Campania	9	5	59
Triabunna	6	0	12	0	1084	1750	61.94%	24									
Swansea	4	0	14	0	1033	1939	53.27%	16									
Campbell Town	1	0	17	0	703	2421	29.04%	4									

== 2019 Ladder ==
Oatlands DFA	Wins	Byes	Losses	Draws	For	Against	%	Pts	Final	Team	G	B	Pts	Team	G	B	Pts
Mt Pleasant	15	0	3	0	2025	809	250.31%	60	1st Semi	Triabunna	9	12	66	Oatlands	6	5	41
Campania	14	0	4	0	2169	915	237.05%	56	2nd Semi	Mt Pleasant	17	13	115	Campania	2	8	20
Oatlands	11	0	7	0	1914	1367	140.01%	44	Preliminary	Campania	18	11	119	Triabunna	9	16	70
Triabunna	10	0	8	0	1925	1092	176.28%	40	Grand	Mt Pleasant	12	19	91	Campania	6	3	39
Bothwell	9	0	9	0	1983	1375	144.22%	36									
Swansea	4	0	14	0	1060	1940	54.64%	16									
Campbell Town	0	0	18	0	253	3714	6.81%	0									

== 2021 Ladder ==
Oatlands DFA	Wins	Byes	Losses	Draws	For	Against	%	Pts	Final	Team	G	B	Pts	Team	G	B	Pts
Mt Pleasant	12	3	0	0	-	-	263.43%	48	1st Semi	Campania	6	8	44	Triabunna	5	12	42
Bothwell	8	3	4	0	-	-	212.05%	32	2nd Semi	Mt Pleasant	8	9	57	Bothwell	3	8	26
Triabunna	7	3	5	0	-	-	202.34%	28	Preliminary	Bothwell	15	18	108	Campania	6	5	41
Campania	3	3	9	0	-	-	63.34%	12	Grand	Mt Pleasant	11	12	78	Bothwell	11	5	71
Campbell Town	0	3	12	0	-	-	11.24%	0									

== 2022 Ladder ==
Oatlands DFA	Wins	Byes	Losses	Draws	For	Against	%	Pts	Final	Team	G	B	Pts	Team	G	B	Pts
Bothwell	12	2	0	0	-	-	440.10%	48									
Campbell Town	10	2	2	0	-	-	289.26	40									
Triabunna	7	2	5	0	-	-	270.34	28									
Mt Pleasant	7	2	5	0	-	-	195.68	28									
Campania	4	2	8	0	-	-	131.25	16									
Woodsdale	2	2	10	0	-	-	23.52	8									
Oatlands	0	2	12	0	-	-	3.27	0									

== Published books ==
- Australian Rules football in Tasmania – John Stoward – 2002, ISBN 0-9577515-7-5
- More on football – B.T.(Buck) Anderton – Central Coast Courier, 2002, ISBN 0-9581306-0-4
