= Midlands Football Association =

Australian rules football league

- Most recent season or competition: 1971
- Sport: Australian rules football
- Founded: 1924
- First season: 1924
- Folded: 1971
- No. of teams: 4 (1971), 7 (historical)
- Country: Australia
- Last champion: Oatlands (1971)
- Most titles: Campbell Town (10)

The Midlands Football Association was an Australian rules football competition based in the Tasmanian Midlands. The MFA was unique in being the only Tasmanian football competition to feature clubs from both the north and south of the state.

== History ==
The Midlands FA began in 1924 with Campbell Town, Cleveland, Ross and Tunbridge competing. This first iteration of the competition would only last two seasons and the MFA would enter recess between 1926 and 1930. The competition was re-formed in 1931 without Tunbridge. Cleveland were replaced by Tunbridge in 1932, while Oatlands joined for the first time in 1933. Tunbridge would again drop out of the competition in 1934. The competition would lapse after the 1936 season, with Campbell Town and Ross forming the Northern Midlands FA and Oatlands the Southern Midlands FA. The 1930s were dominated by Campbell Town, who won 5 out of 6 premierships.

The MFA was re-formed in 1946, with six clubs participating - Campbell Town, Ross, Mount Pleasant, Oatlands, Tunbridge and Tunnack. The competition was reduced to 4 clubs in 1948 when Oatlands left for the Southern Districts Football Association and Tunbridge for the Pyke Trophy. Oatlands would return the next year, replacing Mount Pleasant. The four-club line-up of Campbell Town, Ross, Tunnack and Oatlands would remain the same for the rest of the MFA's existence. Ross won four premierships in a row between 1956 and 1959, and achieved another hat-trick between 1966 and 1968. Oatlands would win the last three premierships of the MFA in a row. After the 1971 season the competition disbanded, with Campbell Town joining the Fingal District FA, Ross the Esk FA, Tunnack the South East District FA and Oatlands the TAFL Southern Division.

== Clubs ==
=== Final ===
Club	Colours	Nickname	Home Ground	Former League	Est.	Years in MFA	MFA Senior Premierships		Fate
Club	Colours	Nickname	Home Ground	Former League	Est.	Years in MFA	Total	Years	Fate
Campbell Town		Robins	Campbell Town Oval, Campbell Town	NMFA	1886	1924-1925, 1931-1936, 1946-1971	10	1924, 1931, 1932, 1934, 1935, 1936, 1950, 1951, 1955, 1961	Formed Northern Midlands FA in 1937. Moved to Fingal District FA in 1972
Oatlands	(1940s-?)(?-1971)	Tigers	Oatlands Oval, Oatlands	NMFA, SDFA	1879	1933-1936, 1946-1947, 1949-1971	9	1933, 1953, 1954, 1960, 1962, 1965, 1969, 1970, 1971	Formed Southern Midlands FA in 1937. Played in Southern Districts FA in 1948. Moved to TAFL Southern Division in 1972
Ross		Demons	Ross Recreation Ground, Ross	NMFA	1878	1924-1925, 1931-1936, 1946-1971	9	1946, 1948, 1956, 1957, 1958, 1959, 1966, 1967, 1968	Formed Northern Midlands FA in 1937. Moved to Esk FA in 1972
Tunnack	(1946-?)(?-1971)	Eagles	Tunnack Football Oval, Tunnack	ODFA	1910	1946-1971	5	1947, 1949, 1952, 1963, 1964	Moved to South East District FA in 1972

=== Former ===
Club	Colours	Nickname	Home Ground	Former League	Est.	Years in MFA	MFA Senior Premierships		Fate
Club	Colours	Nickname	Home Ground	Former League	Est.	Years in MFA	Total	Years	Fate
Cleveland			Cleveland Recreation Ground, Cleveland	–	1903	1924-1925, 1931	0	-	Entered recess in 1932. Re-formed in Northern Midlands FA in 1937.
Mt Pleasant		Mounties	Pawtella Oval, Pawtella	ODFA	1920	1946-1948	0	-	Entered recess in 1948. Re-formed in Oatlands District FA in 1953
Tunbridge		Redlegs	Tunbridge Oval, Tunbridge	ODFA	1895	1924-1925, 1932-1933, 1946-1947	0	-	Entered recess in 1934. Re-formed in Oatlands District FA in 1936. Moved to Pyke Trophy in 1948.

== Premierships ==
Year	Premier	Score	Runners-up	Notes
1924	Campbell Town			
1925	?			
1926-30	Recess			
1931	Campbell Town	8.10 (58) - 8.8 (56)	Ross	
1932	Campbell Town	10.7 (67) - 8.14 (62)	Ross	
1933	Oatlands	15.3 (93) - 9.13 (67)	Campbell Town	
1934	Campbell Town	13.9 (87) - 8.7 (55)	Oatlands	
1935	Campbell Town	8.13 (61) - 9.5 (59)	Ross	
1936	Campbell Town	11.13 (79) - 9.3 (57)	Oatlands	
1937-45	Recess			
1946	Ross	10.5 (65) - 9.10 (64)	Tunnack	
1947	Tunnack	9.10 (64) - 8.9 (57)	Ross	
1948	Ross	11.8 (74) - 8.10 (58)	Campbell Town	
1949	Tunnack	13.11 (89) - 10.13 (73)	Campbell Town	
1950	Campbell Town	11.14 (80) - 7.9 (51)	Ross	
1951	Campbell Town	13.7 (85) - 1.14 (20)	Oatlands	
1952	Tunnack	9.6 (60) - 8.9 (57)	Oatlands	
1953	Oatlands	15.16 (106) - 10.16 (76)	Ross	
1954	Oatlands	11.12 (78) - 8.12 (60)	Tunnack	
1955	Campbell Town	18.6 (114) - 9.17 (71)	Ross	
1956	Ross	13.9 (87) - 11.16 (82)	Campbell Town	
1957	Ross	17.23 (125) - 11.16 (82)	Tunnack	
1958	Ross	16.10 (106) - 12.8 (80)	Oatlands	
1959	Ross	16.4 (100) - 8.17 (65)	Oatlands	
1960	Oatlands	4.8 (32) - 2.6 (18)	Ross	
1961	Campbell Town	15.9 (99) - 11.11 (77)	Tunnack	
1962	Oatlands	9.18 (72) - 3.13 (31)	Campbell Town	
1963	Tunnack	15.19 (109) - 8.13 (61)	Oatlands	
1964	Tunnack	13.10 (88) - 10.7 (67)	Campbell Town	
1965	Oatlands	12.17 (89) - 7.12 (54)	Ross	
1966	Ross	12.17 (89) - 9.13 (67)	Oatlands	
1967	Ross	17.9 (111) - 16.11 (107)	Oatlands	
1968	Ross	11.16 (82) - 4.17 (41)	Oatlands	
1969	Oatlands	12.13 (85) - 8.8 (56)	Ross	
1970	Oatlands	18.17 (125) - 7.13 (55)	Ross	
1971	Oatlands	17.14 (116) - 12.11 (83)	Campbell Town	
