= Old Scholars Football Association =

- Founded: 1987
- No. of teams: 6

The Old Scholars Football Association is an Australian rules football competition in southern Tasmania, Australia.
The competition currently stages an eighteen-round roster season which is cut to a top four at the end of the roster series for a four match finals series played according to the McIntyre system, culminating in the grand final.

== History ==
The former Tasmanian Amateur Football League (Southern Division) known also as the Southern Amateurs split into two divisions at the start of the 1981 season, forming a District division and an Old Scholars division.
In 1987, the clubs in the TAFL (Old Scholars Division) broke away to form the Old Scholars Football Association.
With the admission of the Richmond Football Club in 2001 and Channel Football Club in 2009, the competition saw the loss of New Town Old Scholars in 1995 and The Friends' School Old Boys Football Club (formed in 1934) in the 2005 season.

== Clubs ==
=== Locations ===
Locations of the OSFA clubs

=== Current ===
Club	Colours	Nickname	Home Ground	Former League	Est.	Years in OSFA	OSFA Premierships	
Club	Colours	Nickname	Home Ground	Former League	Est.	Years in OSFA	Total	Years
Dominic Old Scholars Association (DOSA)		Roosters	TCA Ground, Queens Domain	TAFL	1976	1987-	8	1987, 1994, 1995, 1999, 2013, 2018, 2019, 2025
Hutchins' Old Boys		Lions	Queenborough Oval, Sandy Bay	TAFL	1932	1987-	9	2000, 2003, 2004, 2006, 2007, 2010, 2012, 2014, 2022
Old Hobartians Association (OHA)		Ships	Geilston Bay Oval, Geilston Bay	TAFL	1919	1987-	6	1988, 2008, 2011, 2020, 2021, 2024
Richmond		Blues	Richmond War Memorial Oval, Richmond	TFA	1878	2001-	5	2004, 2005, 2009, 2015, 2017
St Virgil's Old Boys		Saints	New Town Bike Track Oval, New Town	TAFL	1927	1987-	4	1996, 1998, 2001, 2023
Tasmanian University		Rainbows	UTAS Football Oval, Sandy Bay	TAFL	1936	1987-	3	1992, 1993, 2016

=== Former ===
Club	Colours	Nickname	Home Ground	Former League	Est.	Years in OSFA	OSFA Premierships		Fate
Club	Colours	Nickname	Home Ground	Former League	Est.	Years in OSFA	Total	Years	Fate
Channel		Saints	Snug Park, Snug	SFL	1967	2009-2015	0	-	Folded after 2016 season
Friends' Old Boys		Bulldogs	TCA Ground, Queens Domain	TAFL	1934	1987-2006	4	1989, 1990, 1991, 1997	Folded during 2006 season
New Town Old Scholars		Devils	New Town High School Oval, New Town	TAFL	1935	1987-1995	0	-	Folded after 1995 season

== Senior Premiership Winners ==
Tasmanian Amateur FL (Old Scholars Division)
- 1981: Hutchins 9.14 (68) d OTOS 7.15 (57)
- 1982: OHA 10.18 (78) d Hutchins 5.8 (38)
- 1983: Hutchins 11.14 (80) d OHA 8.7 (55)
- 1984: DOSA 9.6 (60) d Hutchins 5.9 (39)
- 1985: University 10.18 (78) d Friends' 9.15 (69)
- 1986: DOSA 20.9 (129) d University 6.12 (48)

Old Scholars Football Association

- 1987: DOSA 12.10 (82) d Friends' 11.10 (76)
- 1988: OHA 18.16 (124) d Friends' 6.8 (44)
- 1989: Friends' 16.11 (107) d University 7.11 (53)
- 1990: Friends' 11.23 (89) d University 6.7 (43)
- 1991: Friends' 16.5 (101) d Hutchins 11.17 (83)
- 1992: University 12.12 (84) d Hutchins 5.8 (38)
- 1993: University 9.12 (66) d St Virgils 10.4 (64)
- 1994: DOSA 15.7 (97) d Friends' 13.9 (87)
- 1995: DOSA 13.14 (92) d Friends' 9.11 (65)
- 1996: St Virgils 16.19 (115) d OHA 7.5 (47)
- 1997: Friends' 17.5 (107) d DOSA 6.9 (45)
- 1998: St Virgils 22.11 (143) d DOSA 15.6 (96)
- 1999: DOSA 14.12 (96) d Hutchins 10.7 (67)
- 2000: Hutchins 8.10 (58) d St Virgils 6.14 (50)
- 2001: St Virgils 17.12 (114) d Hutchins 13.9 (87)
- 2002: Hutchins 16.8 (104) d OHA 14.9 (93)
- 2003: Hutchins 18.11 (119) d OHA 11.9 (75)
- 2004: Richmond 8.13 (61) d DOSA 7.10 (52)
- 2005: Richmond 11.11 (77) d DOSA 8.15 (63)
- 2006: Hutchins 24.15 (159) d University 12.10 (82)
- 2007: Hutchins 17.19 (121) d DOSA 9.10 (64)
- 2008: OHA 14.9 (93) d Richmond 9.19 (73)
- 2009: Richmond 15.15 (105) d St Virgils 9.9 (63)
- 2010: Hutchins 15.13 (103) d St Virgils 7.9 (51)
- 2011: OHA 14.22 (106) d Richmond 7.6 (48)
- 2012: Hutchins 20.18 (138) d DOSA 13.11 (89)
- 2013: DOSA 13.6 (84) d Hutchins 9.15 (69)
- 2014: Hutchins 14.16 (100) d DOSA 5.12 (42)
- 2015: Richmond 17.13 (115) d DOSA 8.5 (53)
- 2016: University 13.13 (91) d Richmond 13.11 (89)
- 2017: Richmond 19.10 (124) d Hutchins 7.13 (55)
- 2018: DOSA 8.13 (61) d Richmond 7.3 (45)
- 2019: DOSA 15.14 (104) d Richmond 8.8 (56)
- 2020: OHA 12.7 (79) d Hutchins 10.9 (69)
- 2021: OHA 10.10 (70) d St Virgils 9.9 (63)
- 2022: Hutchins 12.12 (84) d DOSA 5.12 (42)
- 2023: St Virgils 22.17 (149) d University 7.6 (48)
- 2024: OHA 14.11 (95) d DOSA 8.6 (54)
- 2025: DOSA 19.10 (124) d OHA 9.5 (59)

== Reserves Premiership Winners ==
TAFL (Old Scholars Division): Reserves Premiers

- 1981 – Hutchins
- 1982 – OHA
- 1983 – Hutchins
- 1984 – DOSA
- 1985 – University
- 1986 – DOSA

Old Scholars FA: Reserves Premiers

- 1987 – Friends
- 1988 – New Town
- 1989 – St Virgils
- 1990 – Hutchins
- 1991 – Hutchins
- 1992 – University
- 1993 – University
- 1994 – University
- 1995 – University
- 1996 – OHA
- 1997 – Friends
- 1998 – St Virgils
- 1999 – Hutchins
- 2000 – Hutchins
- 2001 – Hutchins
- 2002 – Hutchins
- 2003 – DOSA
- 2004 – Richmond
- 2005 – University
- 2006 – Hutchins
- 2007 – Hutchins
- 2008 – OHA
- 2009 – Hutchins
- 2010 – St Virgils
- 2011 – Richmond
- 2012 – DOSA
- 2013 – St Virgils
- 2014 – DOSA
- 2015 – University
- 2016 – University
- 2017 – Richmond
- 2018 – DOSA
- 2019 – DOSA
- 2020 – Hutchins
- 2021 – Hutchins
- 2022 – Hutchins
- 2023 – Hutchins
- 2024 – DOSA
- 2025 – DOSA

== Thirds Premiership Winners ==
TAFL (Old Scholars Division): Thirds Premiers

- 1981 – DOSA
- 1982 – Fisher
- 1983 – University
- 1984 – University
- 1985 – University
- 1986 – Fisher

Old Scholars FA: Thirds Premiers

- 1987 – Fisher
- 1988 – Lindisfarne
- 1989 – Fisher
- 1990 – University
- 1991 – Fisher
- 1992 – University
- 1993 – Fisher
- 1994 – New Town
- 1995 – University
- 1996 – St Virgils
- 1997 – St Virgils
- 1998 – Fisher
- 1999 – Fisher
- 2000 – St Virgils
- 2001 – New Town
- 2002 – New Town

== 2016 Ladder ==
Old Scholars FA	Wins	Byes	Losses	Draws	For	Against	%	Pts	Final	Team	G	B	Pts	Team	G	B	Pts
University	17	0	3	0	2284	1393	163.96%	68	1st semi	Richmond	19	10	124	Hutchins	4	11	35
Dominic Old Scholars Assoc	16	0	3	1	2064	1543	133.77%	66	2nd semi	University	20	13	133	Dominic Old Scholars Assoc	15	12	102
Richmond	13	0	7	0	2096	1329	157.71%	52	Preliminary	Richmond	18	17	125	Dominic Old Scholars Assoc	9	4	58
Hutchins	8	0	12	0	1457	1914	76.12%	32	Grand	University	13	13	91	Richmond	13	11	89
Old Hobart Amateurs	5	0	14	1	1759	1928	91.23%	22									
St Virgils	0	0	20	0	1215	2768	43.89%	0									

== 2017 Ladder ==
Old Scholars FA	Wins	Byes	Losses	Draws	For	Against	%	Pts	Final	Team	G	B	Pts	Team	G	B	Pts
Dominic Old Scholars Assoc	13	0	4	1	1629	1309	124.45%	54	1st semi	Hutchins	12	12	84	Old Hobart Amateurs	10	8	68
Richmond	13	0	5	0	1945	1139	170.76%	52	2nd semi	Richmond	10	13	73	Dominic Old Scholars Assoc	6	5	41
Old Hobart Amateurs	12	0	5	1	1893	1233	153.53%	50	Preliminary	Hutchins	14	7	91	Dominic Old Scholars Assoc	7	11	53
Hutchins	9	0	9	0	1651	1540	107.21%	36	Grand	Richmond	19	10	124	Hutchins	7	13	55
University	6	0	12	0	1714	1597	107.33%	24									
St Virgils	0	0	18	0	784	2798	28.02%	0									

== 2018 Ladder ==
Old Scholars FA	Wins	Byes	Losses	Draws	For	Against	%	Pts	Final	Team	G	B	Pts	Team	G	B	Pts
Richmond	13	0	5	0	1766	1150	153.57%	52	1st semi	University	9	13	67	Old Hobart Amateurs	8	12	60
Dominic Old Scholars Assoc	13	0	5	0	1892	1263	149.80%	52	2nd semi	Dominic Old Scholars Assoc	8	16	64	Richmond	8	12	60
Old Hobart Amateurs	12	0	6	0	1917	1271	150.83%	48	Preliminary	Richmond	6	11	47	University	2	11	23
University	9	0	9	0	1776	1307	135.88%	36	Grand	Dominic Old Scholars Assoc	8	13	61	Richmond	7	3	45
Hutchins	6	0	12	0	1303	1751	74.41%	24									
St Virgils	1	0	17	0	963	2875	33.50%	4									

== 2019 Ladder ==
Old Scholars FA	Wins	Byes	Losses	Draws	For	Against	%	Pts	Final	Team	G	B	Pts	Team	G	B	Pts
Dominic Old Scholars Assoc	14	0	4	0	1831	1285	142.49%	56	1st semi	Richmond	17	13	115	University	13	9	87
Old Hobart Amateurs	15	0	3	0	2163	1318	164.11%	60	2nd semi	Dominic Old Scholars Assoc	12	8	80	Richmond	11	11	77
Richmond	10	0	8	0	1857	1292	143.73%	40	Preliminary	Richmond	17	9	111	Old Hobart Amateurs	12	18	90
University	7	0	11	0	1449	1538	94.21%	28	Grand	Dominic Old Scholars Assoc	15	14	104	Richmond	8	8	56
Hutchins	7	0	11	0	1384	1605	86.23%	28									
St Virgils	1	0	17	0	1006	2652	37.93%	4									

== 2020 Ladder ==
0	Wins	Byes	Losses	Draws	For	Against	%	Pts	Final	Team	G	B	Pts	Team	G	B	Pts
Hutchins	7	0	1	0	876	524	167.18%	28	1st semi	Dominic Old Scholars Assoc	11	14	80	University	12	5	77
Old Hobart Amateurs	6	0	2	0	1157	625	185.12%	24	2nd semi	Hutchins	18	18	126	Old Hobart Amateurs	17	16	118
University	3	0	5	0	628	672	93.45%	12	Preliminary	Old Hobart Amateurs	11	14	80	Dominic Old Scholars Assoc	11	8	74
Dominic Old Scholars Assoc	3	0	5	0	690	808	85.40%	12	Grand	Old Hobart Amateurs	12	7	79	Hutchins	10	9	69
St Virgils	1	0	7	0	482	1204	40.03%	4									
