= St Patrick's Old Collegians Football Club =

- Full name: St Patrick's Old Collegians Football Club
- Nickname: The Saints
- Sport: Australian rules football
- Founded: 1931
- First season: 1931
- League: Northern Tasmanian Football Association
- Home ground: St Patrick's Old Collegians Football Club, Morris Street, Prospect, Tasmania
- Anthem: "Oh When the Saints Go Marching In"
- President: Ian McCallum
- Secretary: Dennis Barnes
- 2015: Seniors: Undefeated Minor Premiers and Grand Final Runners Up. Reserves: Undefeated Premiers.

Strip
- Home: Green, with two gold horizontal hoops with "the Champ" in the middle of the front until 2015 when it was altered to be Green with a Gold Cross on the front and a miniature version of "The Champ" placed on the back between the shoulders.

St Patrick's Old Collegians Football Club Inc. Est. 1931 (known as SPOCFC or St Pat's Football Club) is an Australian rules football club in Prospect, Tasmania, and competes in the Northern Tasmanian Football Association.

The mascot for the "Saints" is "the Champ" a footballer on the run with ball under the arm and the other arm outstretched, dressed in his football gear with a halo above his head.

Prior to the formation of the Northern Tasmanian Football Association the club competed in the Tasmanian Amateur Football League.

The club as the name suggests was originally formed as an offshoot for past school boys to continue playing organised sport.

The club continues to foster a relationship with St Patrick's College, but not all players are recruited from the school.

The club is situated in Prospect on a lower oval of the college's grounds.

The oval has adequate lighting facilities to host night games.

The oval is unique in that it has a very sandy soil and is very difficult for grass to grow at the top end of the oval. The oval has been used as a conceptual model for urban salinity in Launceston, Tasmania.

== Premierships ==
Seniors

- Tasmanian Amateur Football League (TAFL): 1931, 1932, 1935, 1936
- TAFL Northern Division (TAFLND): 1948, 1954, 1955, 1956, 1984
- NTFA Division Two: 1996, 1999 (undefeated), 2002, 2004
- TAFL State Championship (Conder Shield): 1932, 1954
- Runners Up: 1968, 1970, 1971, 1973, 1979, 2014, 2015

Reserves

- NTFA Division Two 1996, 1998, 1999 (undefeated), 2002, 2005, 2014, 2015 (undefeated)

== Competition best and fairest ==
- TAFL best and fairest: H. McIntee 1937
- Max Allen Cup: D. Hay 1950; J. Cunningham 1952; A. Neville 1954, 1955, 1956; K. Hudson 1969
- NTFA Division Two best and fairest: Jason Matthews 2001
- NTFA Division Two reserves best and fairest: Graeme Taylor 1996 Ben House 2000
