= Western Tasmanian Football Association =

Australian rules football association in Western Tasmania

- Most recent season or competition: 1993
- Formerly: Lyell District FA (1897-1923); Queenstown FA (1924-1963)
- Founded: 1897
- Folded: 1994
- No. of teams: 4 (1993), 26 (historical)
- Venue: Queenstown Oval
- Last champion: Lyell-Gormanston (11) (1993)

The Western Tasmanian Football Association was an Australian Rules Football competition based on the West Coast of Tasmania, Australia.
The competition was made up of mostly miners living and working on the State's West Coast.

Of all the clubs that participated in the competition, only the Queenstown Football Club (now nicknamed the Crows) and Rosebery-Toorak Football Club remain in existence, participating in competitions on the North West Coast.

== History ==
There was an earlier named entity proposed in the 1890s.

- The League began in 1924 as the Queenstown Football Association.
- The League underwent a name change to the Western Tasmanian Football Association in 1963 as it absorbed the clubs from the Rosebery Football Association.

In 1976, the WTFA absorbed the surviving clubs from the Murchison Football Association. The Lyell Football Club and the Gormanston Football Club merged in 1976 and formed Lyell-Gormanston Football Club.

- In 1977, the Smelters Football Club and the City Football Club Merged and formed the Queenstown Football Club.

Rosebery Football Club and Toorak Football Club merged in 1987 forming the Rosebery-Toorak Football Club.

- Rosebery-Toorak Football Club leave the WTFA and join the NWFA to start in 1990.
- In 1991, the Strahan Football Club re-formed and entered the WTFA, they last played in the Murchison FA in 1958.
- The WTFA closed down at the end of 1993. The Queenstown Crows were formed in 1994 from the merger of Lyell-Gormanston and the Queenstown Blues and are still playing in the Darwin Association.

== Clubs ==
=== Final clubs ===
Club	Colours	Nickname	Home Ground	Former League	Est.	Years in WTFA	WTFA Senior Premierships		Fate
Club	Colours	Nickname	Home Ground	Former League	Est.	Years in WTFA	Total	Years	Fate
Lyell-Gormanston		Lions	Queenstown Oval, Queenstown	–	1976	1976-1993	11	1976, 1981, 1982, 1986, 1987, 1988, 1989, 1990, 1991, 1992, 1993	Merged with Queenstown to form Queenstown Crows in Darwin FA after 1993 season
Queenstown		Blues	Queenstown Oval, Queenstown	–	1977	1977-1993	3	1978, 1983, 1984	Merged with Lyell-Gormanston to form Queenstown Crows in Darwin FA after 1993 season
Strahan		Seals	Strahan Recreation Ground, Strahan	ZFA	1900	1991-1993	0	-	Folded when WTFA closed down after 1993 season
Zeehan	(1980s)(?-1993)	Bulldogs	Zeehan Cricket Ground, Zeehan	MFA	1896	1976-1993	1	1985	Moved to Leven FA after 1993 season

=== Former clubs ===
Club	Colours	Nickname	Home Ground	Former League	Est.	Years in WTFA	WTFA Senior Premierships		Fate
Club	Colours	Nickname	Home Ground	Former League	Est.	Years in WTFA	Total	Years	Fate
City	(1950s)(?-1976)	Magpies	Queenstown Oval, Queenstown	–	1920	1924-1976	13	1926, 1934, 1937, 1939, 1940, 1941, 1947, 1948, 1952, 1953, 1957, 1960, 1963	Merged with Smelters to form Queenstown in 1977
Converters			Queenstown Oval, Queenstown	–	1900	1900	0	-	Moved to Lyell District JFA in 1901
Fire Brigade			Queenstown Oval, Queenstown	–	1913	1913-1915, 1923	0	-	Recess between 1916-22. Folded after 1923 season
Flux Quarries			Queenstown Oval, Queenstown	–	1897	1897-1899	1	1897	Folded after 1899 season
Gormanston		Blues, Mountain Men	Gormanston Recreation Ground, Gormanston	LMFA	1900	1933-1941, 1945-1975	8	1936, 1949, 1950, 1965, 1966, 1968, 1969, 1970	Merged with Lyell to form Lyell-Gormanston in 1976
Linda Valley			Linda Recreation Ground, Linda	–	1900	1901-1902	0	-	Unaffiliated between 1903-08. Formed Lyell Miners FA in 1909
Lyell (1)			Queenstown Oval, Queenstown	–	1899	1899-1900, 1904, 1907	0	-	Recess between 1901-03 and 1905-06. Folded after 1907.
Lyell (2)		Maroons, Eagles	Queenstown Oval, Queenstown	–	1942	1942-1975	10	1942, 1943, 1944, 1945, 1946, 1951, 1958, 1961, 1962, 1964	Merged with Gormanston to form Lyell-Gormanston in 1976
Mechanics			Queenstown Oval, Queenstown	–	1904	1904-1911, 1919-1923	6	1903, 1906, 1911, 1919, 1920, 1921	Recess between 1912-18. Folded after 1923 season
Mines United	Dark with light monogram		Queenstown Oval, Queenstown	–	1930	1930-1943	3	1932, 1933, 1935	Folded after 1943 season
Queenstown (1)			Queenstown Oval, Queenstown	–	1897	1897-1899, 1902	1	1898	Recess in 1900-01. Folded after 1902 season
Railway	(1905-15) (1923-29)		Queenstown Oval, Queenstown	–	1905	1905-1915, 1923-1929	6	1905, 1909, 1910, 1914, 1923, 1925	Folded after 1929 season
Rosebery	(1964-67)(1968-86)	Saints	Rosebery Park Oval, Rosebery	RFA	1924	1964-1986	6	1971, 1972, 1974, 1975, 1979, 1980	Merged with Toorak to form Rosebery-Toorak in 1987
Rosebery-Toorak		Hawks	Rosebery Park Oval, Rosebery	–	1987	1987-1990	0	-	Moved to North Western FA in 1990
St Martin's			Queenstown Oval, Queenstown	–	1909	1909-1911	0	-	Folded after 1911 season
Smelters	(1899)(1950s)(?-1976)	Robins	Queenstown Oval, Queenstown	–	c.1900	1897-1908, 1913-1915, 1924-1941, 1944-1976	18	1899, 1901, 1902, 1904, 1907, 1908, 1915, 1924, 1927, 1928, 1929, 1930, 1931, 1938, 1954, 1955, 1956, 1959	Merged with City to form Queenstown in 1977
Soldiers United			Queenstown Oval, Queenstown	–	1919	1919-1922	1	1922	Folded after 1922 season
Toorak		Tigers	Rosebery Park Oval, Rosebery	RFA	1926	1964-1986	2	1967, 1977	Merged with Rosebery to form Rosebery-Toorak in 1987
Trades			Queenstown Oval, Queenstown	–	1903	1903	0	-	Moved to Lyell District JFA in 1904
Tullah-Savage River (Tullah 1976-86)	(1976-?)(?-1988)	Roos, River Raiders	Tullah Recreation Ground, Tullah	MFA	1930	1976-1988	0	-	Folded after 1988 season
Union			Queenstown Oval, Queenstown	–	1900	1900-1901	1	1900	Folded after 1901 season
YMCA			Queenstown Oval, Queenstown	–	1919	1919-1922	0	-	Folded after 1922 season

== Premierships ==
- 1897 ― Flux Quarries
- 1898 ― Queenstown
- 1899 ― Smelters
- 1900 ― Union
- 1901 ― Smelters
- 1902 ― Smelters
- 1903 ― Mechanics
- 1904 ― Smelters
- 1905 ― Railway
- 1906 ― Mechanics
- 1907 ― Smelters
- 1908 ― Smelters
- 1909 ― Railway
- 1910 ― Railway
- 1911 ― Mechanics
- 1912 ― No competition
- 1913 ― None
- 1914 ― Railway
- 1915 ― Smelters
- 1916-18 ― Recess (WWI)
- 1919 ― Mechanics
- 1920 ― Mechanics
- 1921 ― Mechanics
- 1922 ― Returned Soldiers
- 1923 ― Railway
- 1924 ― Smelters
- 1925 ― Railway
- 1926 ― City
- 1927 ― Smelters
- 1928 ― Smelters
- 1929 ― Smelters
- 1930 ― Smelters
- 1931 ― Smelters
- 1932 ― Mines United
- 1933 ― Mines United
- 1934 ― City
- 1935 ― Mines United
- 1936 ― Gormanston
- 1937 ― City
- 1938 ― Smelters
- 1939 ― City
- 1940 ― City
- 1941 ― City
- 1942 ― Lyell
- 1943 ― Lyell
- 1944 ― Lyell
- 1945 ― Lyell
- 1946 ― Lyell
- 1947 ― City
- 1948 ― City
- 1949 ― Gormanston
- 1950 ― Gormanston
- 1951 ― Lyell
- 1952 ― City
- 1953 ― City
- 1954 ― Smelters
- 1955 ― Smelters
- 1956 ― Smelters
- 1957 ― City
- 1958 ― Lyell
- 1959 ― Smelters
- 1960 ― City
- 1961 ― Lyell
- 1962 ― Lyell
- 1963 ― City
- 1964 ― Lyell 15.17 (107) v Gormanston 9.5 (59)
- 1965 ― Gormanston 9.10 (64) v Lyell 4.14 (38)
- 1966 ― Gormanston 16.11 (107) v Lyell 13.9 (87)
- 1967 ― Toorak 8.9 (57) v Rosebery 6.17 (53)
- 1968 ― Gormanston 10.16 (76) v Toorak 8.12 (60)
- 1969 ― Gormanston 12.14 (86) v Rosebery 8.5 (53)
- 1970 ― Gormanston 19.11 (125) v Toorak 16.13 (109)
- 1971 ― Rosebery 20.18 (138) v Toorak 19.12 (126)
- 1972 ― Rosebery 11.12 (78) v Toorak 10.10 (70)
- 1973 ― Smelters 15.13 (103) v Toorak 12.14 (86)
- 1974 ― Rosebery 16.17 (113) v Smelters 7.12 (54)
- 1975 ― Rosebery 15.17 (107) v Toorak 15.13 (103)
- 1976 ― Lyell-Gormanston 26.25 (181) v City 8.12 (60)
- 1977 ― Toorak 15.21 (111) v Lyell-Gormanston 12.18 (90)
- 1978 ― Queenstown 16.26 (122) v Toorak 14.15 (99)
- 1979 ― Rosebery 15.12 (102) v Toorak 13.12 (90)
- 1980 ― Rosebery 12.17 (89) v Toorak 10.12 (72)
- 1981 ― Lyell-Gormanston 20.18 (138) v Rosebery 13.13 (91)
- 1982 ― Lyell-Gormanston 14.14 (98) v Toorak 9.17 (71)
- 1983 ― Queenstown 7.13 (55) v Lyell-Gormanston 4.4 (28)
- 1984 ― Queenstown 15.19 (109) v Lyell-Gormanston 7.21 (63)
- 1985 ― Zeehan 22.10 (142) v Lyell-Gormanston 14.14 (98)
- 1986 ― Lyell-Gormanston 12.15 (87) v Queenstown 12.14 (86)
- 1987 ― Lyell-Gormanston 9.16 (70) v Tullah-Savage River 7.14 (56)
- 1988 ― Lyell-Gormanston 11.18 (84) v Zeehan 7.9 (51)
- 1989 ― Lyell-Gormanston 14.22 (106) v Queenstown 16.8 (104)
- 1990 ― Lyell-Gormanston 22.21 (153) v Queenstown 16.8 (104)
- 1991 ― Lyell-Gormanston 18.18 (126) v Strahan 14.7 (91)
- 1992 ― Lyell-Gormanston 20.19 (139) v Zeehan 13.12 (90)
- 1993 ― Lyell-Gormanston 17.19 (121) v Queenstown 12.12 (84)

== Individual awards ==
- The senior B&F was the Bartram Medal.
- The reserves B&F was the ALB. Broadby Trophy.
- Seniors and reserves both had leading goalkicker awards.

== 1987 Ladder ==
West Tasmanian FA	Wins	Byes	Losses	Draws	For	Against	%	Pts
Rosebery-Toorak	10	0	5	1	1403	1071	131.00%	42
Lyell-Gormanston	9	0	7	0	1447	1336	108.31%	36
Tullah-Savage River	9	0	7	0	1264	1220	103.61%	36
Zeehan	7	0	9	0	1210	1473	82.15%	28
Queenstown	4	0	11	1	1387	1611	86.10%	18

FINALS

Final	Team	G	B	Pts	Team	G	B	Pts
1st Semi	Tullah-Savage River	13	11	89	Zeehan	9	14	68
2nd Semi	Lyell-Gormanston	14	16	100	Rosebery-Toorak	12	8	80
Preliminary	Tullah-Savage River	13	17	95	Rosebery-Toorak	10	8	68
Grand	Lyell-Gormanston	9	16	70	Tullah-Savage River	7	14	56

== See also ==
- Australian rules football in Tasmania
- Leven Football Association
- Darwin Football Association
- North Western Football Association
