= Kingborough Football Association =

Australian rules football league

- Most recent season or competition: 1966
- Sport: Australian rules football
- Founded: 1922
- First season: 1922
- Folded: 1967
- No. of teams: 6 (1967), 8 (historical)
- Country: Australia
- Last champion: Kingston (1966)
- Most titles: Kingston (10)
- Related competitions: Huon FA

The Kingborough Football Association was an Australian rules football competition based in the Kingborough region of southern Tasmania.

== History ==
The KFA began as the Channel Football Association, first formed in 1922 with Gordon, Kettering, Woodbridge and Middleton playing in the inaugural season. Records of the early years of the Association are somewhat incomplete and it isn't always clear which clubs competed in which years between 1923 and 1926. Some premierships from this era are also unknown. in 1926 Woodbridge won the premiership after Middleton forfeited the deciding match. Records of the competition become more concrete starting with the 1927 season, in which Kettering, Margate, Woodbridge and Sandfly all competed.

The Kingborough Football Association name was adopted in 1929 with the entry of Kingston and the return of Middleton. Middleton re-named itself as South Channel in July but withdrew before the completion of the season. Kettering left before the 1931 season and the competition seems to have lapsed in 1932, before returning the next season. Sandfly were the dominant club of the 1930s, winning four premierships including three in a row from 1937 to 1939. They also went undefeated for two seasons during this period. Kingston left the Association during the 1938 season after a protest registered against them by Sandfly for playing an ineligible player was upheld. They were replaced by Kettering in the following season. Owing to a lack of players due to WWII enlistments, the four KFA clubs decided to merge and play in the Huon Football Association as Kingborough for the 1940 season.

The KFA was re-formed in 1945 with Kingston returning and Snug joining from the Channel Junior Football Association. Kingston, Margate and Snug were the dominant clubs of the next 15 years, with two of these three clubs competing in every grand final from 1950 until 1963. Margate won four premierships in a row between 1949 and 1952. Kettering finally broke the three-club dominance with a win over Kingston in the 1964 grand final. Sandfly briefly played in the AYC competition from 1962 to 1963, before returning to the KFA as Longley in 1964.

The end of the KFA came abruptly. Just before the 1967 season opened, many KFA clubs were finding it difficult to fill out 3 football sides. On February 7th, enormous bushfires swept through large swathes of southern Tasmania, devastating the Kingborough region. It became clear that it would be impossible for the clubs to form for the season, and the decision was made for Kettering, Margate, Woodbridge and Snug to merge and play in the Huon Association instead. Kingston absorbed Longley and also moved to the HFA. Longley donated its St Kilda-style jumpers to the newly-formed Channel club, which would become known as the Saints as a result.

== Clubs ==
=== Final ===
Club	Colours	Nickname	Home Ground	Former League	Est.	Years in KFA	KFA Senior Premierships		Fate
Club	Colours	Nickname	Home Ground	Former League	Est.	Years in KFA	Total	Years	Fate
Kettering	(1920s)(1946-?)(?-1966)		Kettering Oval, Kettering	–	1901	1922, 1924-1925, 1929-1930, 1939-1966	2	1947, 1964	In recess/not associated with a league between 1932-38. Merged with Margate, Snug and Woodbridge to form Channel in Huon FA in 1967
Kingston		Tigers	Kingston Beach Sports Ground, Kingston Beach	QFA	1903	1929-1931, 1933-1938, 1945-1966	10	1930, 1933, 1936, 1948, 1953, 1958, 1960, 1961, 1965, 1966	Played in Queenborough FA in 1939. Moved to Huon FA in 1967
Longley (Sandfly 1924-61)	(1924-61)(1964-67)	Saints	Sandfly Football Ground, Sandfly	AYC	1909	1924, 1927-1931, 1933-1961, 1964-1966	7	1924, 1934, 1937, 1938, 1939, 1945, 1946	Played in AYC between 1962-63. Absorbed by Kingston after 1966 season
Margate	(1962)(1967)	Waratahs	Margate Memorial Oval, Margate	–	1910	1924, 1927-1931, 1933-1966	9	1935, 1949, 1950, 1951, 1952, 1955, 1959, 1962, 1963	Merged with Kettering, Snug and Woodbridge to form Channel in Huon FA in 1967
Snug		Magpies	Snug Football Ground, Snug	CJFA	1905	1945-1966	3	1954, 1956, 1957	Merged with Kettering, Margate and Woodbridge to form Channel in Huon FA in 1967
Woodbridge		Blue and Golds	Woodbridge Football Ground, Woodbridge	–	1910	1922-1931, 1933-1966	3	1926, 1929, 1931	Merged with Kettering, Margate and Snug to form Channel in Huon FA in 1967

=== Former ===
Club	Colours	Nickname	Home Ground	Former League	Est.	Years in KFA	KFA Senior Premierships		Fate
Club	Colours	Nickname	Home Ground	Former League	Est.	Years in KFA	Total	Years	Fate
Gordon			Gordon Football Ground, Gordon	–	1920	1922	0	-	Unaffiliated in 1923, did not re-form after 1923 season
South Channel (Middleton 1922-29)			Middleton Football Ground, Middleton	–	1920	1922, 1926, 1929	0	-	Withdrew during 1929 season, folded in early 1930.

== Premierships ==
Year	Premier	Score	Runners-up	Notes
1922				
1923				
1924	Sandfly		Woodbridge	
1925				
1926	Woodbridge			
1927				
1928				
1929	Woodbridge	8.11 (57) - 5.7 (37)	Kingston	
1930	Kingston	7.12 (54) - 4.16 (40)	Woodbridge	
1931	Woodbridge	9.10 (64) - 6.16 (52)	Margate	
1932	KFA in recess			
1933	Kingston	9.13 (67) - 7.13 (55)	Sandfly	
1934	Sandfly	11.9 (75) - 4.10 (34)	Woodbridge	
1935	Margate	7.8 (50) - 7.7 (49)	Woodbridge	
1936	Kingston	14.7 (91) - 7.14 (56)	Woodbridge	
1937	Sandfly	10.13 (73) - 8.14 (62)	Margate	
1938	Sandfly			
1939	Sandfly	7.18 (60) - 5.12 (42)	Margate	
1940-44	KFA in recess			
1945	Sandfly		Kettering	
1946	Sandfly	13.14 (92) - 6.14 (50)	Margate	
1947	Kettering		Woodbridge	
1948	Kingston	13.11 (89) - 7.12 (54)	Margate	
1949	Margate	8.9 (57) - 5.10 (40)	Woodbridge	
1950	Margate	13.13 (91) - 11.10 (76)	Kingston	
1951	Margate	11.13 (79) - 12.6 (78)	Snug	
1952	Margate	14.17 (101) - 2.7 (19)	Kingston	
1953	Kingston	8.17 (65) - 5.11 (41)	Margate	
1954	Snug	9.12 (66) - 9.9 (63)	Margate	
1955	Margate	21.14 (140) - 16.5 (101)	Kingston	
1956	Snug	14.9 (93) - 9.13 (67)	Margate	
1957	Snug	14.7 (91) - 11.11 (77)	Kingston	
1958	Kingston	7.14 (56) - 7.10 (52)	Snug	
1959	Margate	9.23 (77) - 6.11 (47)	Snug	
1960	Kingston	15.19 (109) - 7.11 (53)	Snug	
1961	Kingston	9.10 (64) - 5.11 (41)	Snug	
1962	Margate	16.17 (113) - 8.12 (60)	Kingston	
1963	Margate	11.15 (81) - 10.14 (74)	Margate	
1964	Kettering	13.15 (93) - 10.15 (75)	Kingston	
1965	Kingston	14.10 (94) - 5.6 (36)	Kettering	
1966	Kingston	24.22 (160) - 6.4 (40)	Kettering	
