= List of former Australian rules football competitions in Tasmania =

This is a list of former Australian rules football competitions in the Australian state of Tasmania.

== Statewide competitions ==
=== Tasmanian State Premiership (1904–1978) ===
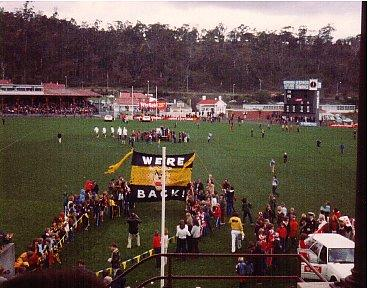
Hobart's banner reads "We're Back!" prior to the 1980 Winfield Statewide Cup final.

The Tasmanian State Premiership was an Australian rules football tournament which was competed originally between the reigning TFL/TANFL and NTFA premiers, with the NWFU joining in from 1954. The State Premiership was finally abandoned after 1978 in favour of sending a combined Tasmanian team to play interstate.

=== Winfield Statewide Cup (1980) ===
The Winfield Statewide Cup was a football tournament held in 1980 between the top twenty-one (21) major football clubs across Tasmania from the three major footballing bodies across the state (at the time), the TANFL, the NTFA and the NWFU.

=== Tasmanian Amateur Football League (1931–1995) ===
The Tasmanian Amateur Football League was a body that controlled amateur football in Tasmania. It ran two competitions - one based in Launceston in the state's north, and one in Hobart in the south.

== Local Competitions ==
=== Associated Youth Clubs (1949–1975) ===
The Associated Youth Clubs (AYC) was based in Hobart. It originally catered for football teams organized by local youth clubs, but expanded to include a number of district clubs throughout its history. After 1975, the AYC disbanded then reorganized into the Southern Tasmanian Football Association.

==== Final clubs ====
Club	Colours	Nickname	Home Ground	Former League	Est.	Years in AYC	AYC Senior Premierships		Fate
Club	Colours	Nickname	Home Ground	Former League	Est.	Years in AYC	Total	Years	Fate
Cambridge		Magpies	Cambridge Memorial Oval, Cambridge	SEDFA, TAFL	1885	1968-1969, 1973-1975	1	1968	Played in TAFL Southern Division between 1970-72. Formed STFA in 1976.
Canes				CSDFA	1948	1959-1975	5	1961, 1962, 1967, 1969, 1970	Folded after 1975 season
Lachlan		Saints	Lachlan Park Oval, New Norfolk	TFA	1922	1972-1975	0	-	Formed STFA in 1976
Maydena		Bulldogs	Maydena Sports Ground, Maydena	SDFA	1952	1975	0	-	Formed STFA in 1976
Metropolitan		Kangaroos	Clare Street Oval, New Town	–	1956	1956-1975	3	1964, 1966, 1974	Formed STFA in 1976
Railway		Blues	Clare Street Oval, New Town	QFA	1876	1957-1975	2	1965, 1971	Formed STFA in 1976
West Hobart		Hawks	West Hobart Recreation Ground, West Hobart		1895	1951, 1957-1975	4	1963, 1972, 1973, 1975	Formed STFA in 1976

==== Former clubs ====
Club	Colours	Nickname	Home Ground	Former League	Est.	Years in AYC	AYC Senior Premierships		Fate
Club	Colours	Nickname	Home Ground	Former League	Est.	Years in AYC	Total	Years	Fate
Cascades Youth Club	Dark with light yoke and monogram on left breast			–	1948	1950-1956	4	1953, 1954, 1955, 1956	Moved to Queenborough FA in 1957
Chigwell	Dark with light vee		Chigwell Football Ground, Chigwell	–	1955	1958-1963	2	1958, 1960	Folded after 1963 season
Dynnyrne Rovers				–	1952	1952-?	0	-	Folded at unknown date after 1954
Eastern Shore Rovers				–	1961	1961-1963, 1973	0	-	Folded
Moonah (Moonah YMCA 1950-54)				GSFA	1914	1950-1954, 1959-1969	0	-	Recess between 1955-58. Folded after 1969 season
Nettlefolds					1929	1955-1962	2	1957, 1959	Folded after 1962 season
New Town Methodists				–	1949	1949-1953	3	1950, 1951, 1952	Folded after 1953 season
New Town Youth Club				–	1949	1949-?	0	-	Folded at unknown date after 1954
Presbyterian Fellowship				–	1949	1949-1950	0	-	Folded after 1950 season
Sandfly		Rovers	Sandfly Football Ground, Sandfly	KFA	1909	1962-1963	0	-	Returned to Kingborough FA as Longley in 1964
Swan Street Methodists				–	1948	1949-1951	1	1949	Folded after 1951 season
Wanderers				–	1950	1950	0	-	Folded after 1950 season
Warrane				CSDFA	1954	1959-1963	0	-	Folded after 1963 season

Premiership Winners

- 1949 – Swan Street Methodists 8.21 (69) d New Town YC 8.7 (55)
- 1950 – New Town Methodists
- 1951 – New Town Methodists 13.12 (90) d New Town YC 9.9 (63)
- 1952 – New Town Methodists d New Town YC
- 1953 – Cascades YC d New Town YC
- 1954 – Cascades YC 6.7 (43) d New Town YC 4.9 (33)
- 1955 – Cascades YC 8.8 (56) d Nettlefolds 7.7 (49)
- 1956 – Cascades YC 10.10 (70) d Nettlefolds 6.7 (43)
- 1957 – Nettlefolds 14.15 (99) d Metropolitan 7.9 (51)
- 1958 – Chigwell 13.8 (86) d Nettlefolds 11.6 (72)
- 1959 – Nettlefolds 10.12 (72) d Chigwell 8.13 (61)
- 1960 – Chigwell 9.6 (60) d Nettlefolds 7.15 (57)
- 1961 – Canes 12.7 (79) d Eastern Shore Rovers 8.10 (58)
- 1962 – Canes 10.12 (72) d West Hobart 6.9 (45)
- 1963 – West Hobart 12.4 (76) d Canes 9.11 (65)
- 1964 – Metropolitan 10.9 (69) d West Hobart 6.13 (49)
- 1965 – Railway 7.10 (52) d Metropolitan 5.11 (41)
- 1966 – Metropolitan 15.17 (107) d Moonah 6.7 (43)
- 1967 – Canes 18.14 (122) d Metropolitan 14.16 (100)
- 1968 – Cambridge 18.12 (120) d Canes 11.13 (79)
- 1969 – Canes 7.11 (53) d Cambridge 6.12 (48)
- 1970 – Canes 10.12 (72) d Railway 6.7 (43)
- 1971 – Railway 8.18 (66) d Canes 7.9 (51)
- 1972 – West Hobart 12.8 (80) d Railway 10.7 (67)
- 1973 – West Hobart 10.17 (77) d Cambridge 6.7 (43)
- 1974 – Metropolitan 13.11 (89) d Lachlan 12.6 (78)
- 1975 – West Hobart 10.16 (76) d Railway 5.8 (38)

=== Beaconsfield Football Association (?–1914) ===
The Beaconsfield Football Association began before the end of the 19th century and was made up of teams from the town of Beaconsfield.
The Association was forced into recess in 1915 because of World War One.
After the war the league was not resumed because of the demise of the towns goldmine and its population.

Teams in the competition included Stars, Rovers, Imperial and Battery.

Premiership Winners

- 1904 – Stars 4.8 (32) d Rovers 1.6 (12)
- 1905 – Imperial
- 1906 –
- 1907 –
- 1908 –
- 1909 – Battery d Rovers (12 Points)
- 1910 –
- 1911 –
- 1912 – Stars 9.7 (61) d Rovers 5.17 (47)
- 1913 –
- 1914 – Stars

=== Bellerive Football Association (1903) ===
Clubs included Bellerive and Union.
The Association lasted one season.

Premiership Winners

- 1903 – Bellerive

=== Bream Creek Football Association ===
Competing Teams Unknown. A Bream Creek combined side played a combined Tasmanian Football Association side in 1927.

=== Brighton Football Association (1922-1931) ===
The Brighton FA was formed in 1922 with Brighton, Bridgewater and Broadmarsh as the inaugural clubs.

There appears to have been a split in the competition in 1930, with Brighton, Bothwell and Kempton competing in the Brighton FA as per usual while Bridgewater, Broadmarsh and Bagdad played in the Brighton Municipal Football Association. These two associations appear to have run separately, with a premier for each being recorded. In 1931 the remaining clubs returned to playing in the BFA following the departure of Bothwell and Brighton.

Final clubs

Club	Colours	Nickname	Home Ground	Former League	Est.	Years in BFA	BFA Senior Premierships		Fate
Club	Colours	Nickname	Home Ground	Former League	Est.	Years in BFA	Total	Years	Fate
Bagdad			Bagdad Football Ground, Bagdad	–	1920	1923-1931	3	1923, 1927, 1928	1932-34 unknown. Joined Richmond FA in 1935
Bridgewater		Swans	Weily Park Oval, Bridgewater		1885	1922, 1926-1931	1	1930 (BMFA)	1923-25 unaffiliated. Moved to Glenorchy Suburban FA in 1932
Broadmarsh			Broadmarsh Recreation Ground, Broadmarsh	–	1922	1922-1928, 1930-1931	0	-	Recess in 1929 and between1932-37. Joined Southern Midlands FA in 1938
Kempton		Magpies	Kempton Oval, Kempton		1864	1925-1931	0	-	1932-33 unknown. Joined Richmond FA in 1934

Former clubs

Club	Colours	Nickname	Home Ground	Former League	Est.	Years in BFA	BFA Senior Premierships		Fate
Club	Colours	Nickname	Home Ground	Former League	Est.	Years in BFA	Total	Years	Fate
Bothwell		Rabbits	Bothwell Recreation Reserve, Bothwell	SCFA	1880	1928-1930	1	1930 (BFA)	Returned to Southern Country FA in 1931
Brighton			Unknown oval in Brighton	–		1922-1930	2	1922, 1929	1930-32 unknown. JoinedRichmond FA in 1933

Premiership Winners

- 1922 – Brighton
- 1923 – Bagdad
- 1924 – ?
- 1925 – ?
- 1926 – ?
- 1927 – Bagdad
- 1928 – Bagdad
- 1929 – Brighton 9.13 (67) d Bothwell 5.8 (38) *
- 1930 (BFA) – Bothwell 16.10 (106) d Kempton 4.11 (35)
- 1930 (BMFA) – Bridgewater
- 1931 – ?

Note:
Brighton's captain/coach in the 1929 Grand Final was the legendary Tasmanian Footballer Horrie Gorringe)
This particular Brighton club, who wore brown and gold playing colours bore no relation to the current club named Brighton which was formerly known as Mangalore up until 1995.

=== Buckingham Football Association ===
The Buckingham Football Association was most likely based around the Hobart suburb of New Town.
Clubs included New Town United, Fitzroy and Maypole Rovers.

=== Central Football Association ===
Clubs included Lefroy Juniors, Carlton, and New Town Juniors.

Premiership Winners

- 1934 – Lefroy Juniors

=== Channel Football Association (1908–1928) ===
A forerunner to the Kingborough Football Association.
Clubs included Gordon, Kettering, Kingston (1908), Margate, Sandfly and Woodbridge.
Member clubs competed for the Warring Shield.

Premiership Winners

- 1908 – Sandfly
- 1909 –
- 1910 –
- 1911 –
- 1912 –
- 1913 –
- 1914 –
- 1915 – Competition suspended (World War One)
- 1916 – Competition suspended (World War One)
- 1917 – Competition suspended (World War One)
- 1918 – Competition suspended (World War One)
- 1919 – Competition suspended (Influenza Outbreak)
- 1920 – Woodbridge 5.7 (37) d Kettering 0.5 (5)
- 1921 – Gordon 4.10 (34) d Woodbridge 3.6 (24)
- 1922 – Gordon 2.13 (25) d Kettering 2.8 (20)
- 1923 –
- 1924 – Sandfly 7.7 (49) d Woodbridge 3.3 (21)
- 1925 – Woodbridge
- 1926 – Woodbridge
- 1927 – Woodbridge
- 1928 – Sandfly 7.7 (49) d Kettering 5.3 (33)

=== Channel Junior Football Association ===
Clubs included Snug, Margate, and Kingston.

=== City and Suburban Football Association ===
Clubs included Cressy Rovers, Timms Bridge, Blundstones and New Town Gymnasium.

=== City Football Association (1931–1934) ===
Clubs included Gray Brothers, Derwent United, Neptune Oils, Standfast, Maypole Rovers, Lindisfarne, and Bellerive Juniors.

Premiership Winners

- 1931 – Gray Brothers 15.10 (100) d Neptune Oils 8.5 (53)
- 1932 – Gray Brothers 12.10 (82) d Derwent United 6.11 (47)
- 1933 – Derwent United 8.5 (53) d Gray Brothers 5.10 (40)
- 1934 – Gray Brothers 13.8 (86) d Lindisfarne 7.5.47

=== Clare Street Football Association (1921–1926) ===
Clubs included Carlton Rovers, Risdon Rovers, Union Rovers, IXL Juniors, Swan Street, North Hobart Rovers, New Town Wanderers, City Rovers, South United and YMCA.

Premiership Winners

- 1921 – South United 3.3 (21) d YMCA 2.4 (16)
- 1922 – City Rovers d Union Rovers (6 points)
- 1923 –
- 1924 – Union Rovers 7.3 (45) d Carlton Rovers 3.8 (26)
- 1925 – Carlton Rovers 6.15 (51) d Union Rovers 4.14 (38)
- 1926 – Carlton Rovers 7.9 (51) d Union Rovers 2.14 (26)

=== Clarence Football Association ===
Clubs included Lindisfarne (–1948), IXL, Bellerive, Cambridge and Aikens.

=== Clarence Sub District Football Association (1948–1958) ===
Clubs included Canes, Gadsdens, Clarence Colts, Lindisfarne, Sandford, South Hobart, Montagu Bay, Forcett, Sorell, Ralphs Bay and Warrane.

Final clubs

Club	Colours	Nickname	Home Ground	Former League	Est.	Years in CSDFA	CSDFA Senior Premierships		Fate
Club	Colours	Nickname	Home Ground	Former League	Est.	Years in CSDFA	Total	Years	Fate
Canes				QFA	1948	1948, 1958	1	1958	Played in Queenborough FA between 1949-57. Moved to AYC in 1959
Forcett			Forcett Recreation Ground, Forcett	SEDFA, SDFA	1884	1950-1952, 1957-1958	1	1950	Played in Southern Districts FA between 1953-56. Folded after 1958 season
Ralphs Bay				–	1957	1957-1958	0	-	Folded after 1958 season
Warrane			Warrane Recreation Ground, Warrane	–	1954	1957-1958	1	1957	Moved to AYC in 1959

Former clubs

Club	Colours	Nickname	Home Ground	Former League	Est.	Years in CSDFA	CSDFA Senior Premierships		Fate
Club	Colours	Nickname	Home Ground	Former League	Est.	Years in CSDFA	Total	Years	Fate
Clarence Colts		Roos	Bellerive Oval, Bellerive	–	1885	1948-1951	0	-	?
Gadsdens				–	1948	1948	0	-	Folded after 1948 season
Lindisfarne		Two Blues	Anzac Park, Lindisfarne		1911	1948	0	-	Also competed in TAFL Southern Division this year
Montagu Bay			Anzac Park, Lindisfarne	–	1950	1950-1952	0	-	Folded after 1952 season
Sandford			Sandford Recreation Ground, Sandford	SEFA	1930	1948-1951	0	-	Folded after 1951 season
South Hobart			Unknown ground in South Hobart		1891	1949-1952	2	1949, 1951	Moved to Southern Districts FA in 1953
Sorell		Magpies	Sorell Memorial Oval, Sorell	PFA, ECFA	1883	1950-1952	1	1952	Moved to East Coast FA in 1953

Premiers

- 1948 – Sandford v Canes (Result Unknown)
- 1949 – South Hobart 13.7 (85) d Sandford 8.8 (56)
- 1950 – Forcett 7.8 (50) d South Hobart 6.9 (45)
- 1951 – South Hobart 8.9 (57) d Sorell 6.6 (42)
- 1952 – Sorell 11.12 (78) d Forcett 5.15 (45)
- 1953 – Competition in Recess
- 1954 – Competition in Recess
- 1955 – Competition in Recess
- 1956 – Competition in Recess
- 1957 – Warrane d Forcett
- 1958 – Canes d Ralphs Bay

=== Coasters' Football Association (1933–1936) ===
Final clubs

Club	Colours	Nickname	Home Ground	Former League	Est.	Years in CFA	CFA Senior Premierships		Fate
Club	Colours	Nickname	Home Ground	Former League	Est.	Years in CFA	Total	Years	Fate
Gladstone			Gladstone Recreation Ground, Gladstone	–	1936	1936	0	-	1937-38 unknown. Joined NEFU in 1939
Moorina			Moorina Recreation Ground, Moorina	NEFA	1902	1933-1936	0	-	Folded after 1936 season
Pioneer			Pioneer Football Ground, Pioneer	NEFA	1907	1933-1936	4	1933, 1934, 1935, 1936	Formed NEFU in 1937

Former clubs

Club	Colours	Nickname	Home Ground	Former League	Est.	Years in CFA	CFA Senior Premierships		Fate
Club	Colours	Nickname	Home Ground	Former League	Est.	Years in CFA	Total	Years	Fate
Weldborough		Robins	Weldborough Football Ground, Weldborough	PFA	1921	1933-1935	0	-	Returned to Portland FA in 1936
Winnaleah			Winnaleah Sports Ground, Winnaleah	NEFA	1905	1933-1935	0	-	Returned to North Eastern FA in 1936

Premiership Winners

- 1933 – Pioneer d Winnaleah
- 1934 – Pioneer 9.18 (72) d Moorina 8.7 (55)
- 1935 – Pioneer 8.15 (63) d Weldborough 7.10 (52)
- 1936 – Pioneer 6.19 (55) d Moorina 7.11 (53)

=== Darwin Football Association (Original – 1938–1949) ===
The original Darwin Football Association was formed as essentially a continuation of the Burnie Football Association. It ran from 1938 until 1941, when it was forced into recess due to WWII. It returned for one season in 1944, then one final time in 1949. This competition is considered separate from the current-day Darwin FA despite both covering roughly the same geographic area.

==== Final clubs ====
Club	Colours	Nickname	Home Ground	Former League	Est.	Years in DFA	DFA Senior Premierships		Fate
Club	Colours	Nickname	Home Ground	Former League	Est.	Years in DFA	Total	Years	Fate
APPM juniors			Wivenhoe Recreation Ground, Wivenhoe	–	1941	1949	0	-	Moved to NWFU in 1950
Burnie juniors		Tigers	West Park Oval, Burnie	BFA	1885	1949	0	-	Moved to NWFU in 1950
Cooee juniors		Bulldogs	West Park Oval, Burnie	–	1894	1949	0	-	Moved to NWFU in 1950
Penguin Juniors		Two Blues	Penguin Recreation Ground, Penguin	RFA	1890	1949	0	-	Moved to NWFU in 1950
Somerset				TCFA	1923	1949	0	-	Recess between 1950-51, re-formed in Darwin FA in 1952
Wynyard Juniors		Cats	Wynyard Football Ground, Wynyard	TCFA	1885	1949	1	1949	Moved to NWFU in 1950
Yolla (2)			Yolla Recreation Ground, Yolla	–	1949	1949	0	-	Folded after 1949 season
Youth Centre			West Park Oval, Burnie	–	1949	1949	0	-	Folded after 1949 season

==== Former clubs ====
Club	Colours	Nickname	Home Ground	Former League	Est.	Years in DFA	DFA Senior Premierships		Fate
Club	Colours	Nickname	Home Ground	Former League	Est.	Years in DFA	Total	Years	Fate
APPM			Wivenhoe Recreation Ground, Wivenhoe	–	1941	1941, 1944	0	-	Moved to NWFU in 1945
Boat Harbour			Boat Harbour Recreation Ground, Boat Harbour	TCFA	1908	1940	0	-	Entered recess in 1941, re-formed in Table Cape FA in 1946
City			Wivenhoe Recreation Ground, Wivenhoe	BFA	1932	1938-1941	1	1939	Folded after 1941 season
Cooee		Bulldogs	West Park Oval, Burnie	DFA	1894	1938-1941, 1944	1	1941	Moved to NWFU in 1945
Old Darwinians			West Park Oval, Burnie	–	1940	1940	0	-	Folded after 1940 season
Penguin		Two Blues	Penguin Recreation Ground, Penguin	NWFU	1890	1938-1939	0	-	Recess between 1940-45, re-formed in NWFU in 1946
Railway			West Park Oval, Burnie	–	1944	1944	1	1944	Moved to NWFU in 1945
Upper Burnie			Upper Burnie Recreation Ground, Upper Burnie	BFA		1940-1941	0	-	Folded after 1941 season
Wynyard		Cats	Wynyard Football Ground, Wynyard	BFA	1885	1938-1941, 1944	0	-	Moved to NWFU in 1945
Yeoman		Robins	Elliott Oval, Elliott	TCFA	1895	1940-1941	1	1940	Moved to NWFU in 1945

==== Premierships ====
- 1938 – Wynyard 12.11 (83) d Penguin 7.11 (53)
- 1939 – City 5.15 (45) d Wynyard 6.7 (43)
- 1940 – Yeoman 13.11 (89) d Wynyard 6.7 (43)
- 1941 – Cooee 13.15 (93) d Upper Burnie 9.5 (59)
- 1942-43 – DFA in recess
- 1944 – Railway 16.14 (110) d APPM 13.12 (90)
- 1945-48 – DFA in recess
- 1949 – Wynyard Juniors 5.7 (37) d APPM juniors 4.8 (32)

=== Deloraine Football Association (1926–1983) ===
Also known as Chudleigh Football Association (1926-1939) and Central Junior Football Association (1946-1949)

=== Denison Football Association ===
Clubs included Derwent, Glebe Juniors, Lindisfarne and Rialannah (Mt Nelson).

Premiership Winners

- 1914 – Derwent

=== Derby Football Association ===
Final clubs

Club	Colours	Nickname	Home Ground	Former League	Est.	Years in DFA	DFA Senior Premierships		Fate
Club	Colours	Nickname	Home Ground	Former League	Est.	Years in DFA	Total	Years	Fate
City			Derby Football Ground, Derby	NEFA	1913	1932-1935	0	-	Folded after 1935 season
Derby			Derby Football Ground, Derby	NEFA	1906	1932-1935	1	1932	Returned to NEFA in 1936
North Derby			Derby Football Ground, Derby	–	1932	1932-1933, 1935	2	1933, 1935	Folded after 1935 season

Former clubs

Club	Colours	Nickname	Home Ground	Former League	Est.	Years in DFA	DFA Senior Premierships		Fate
Club	Colours	Nickname	Home Ground	Former League	Est.	Years in DFA	Total	Years	Fate
IXL			Derby Football Ground, Derby	–	1934	1934	1	1934	Moved to Mount Stronach FA in 1935

Premiership Winners

- 1932 – Derby 10.16 (76) d City 5.18 (48)
- 1933 – North 5.16 (46) d City 5.12 (42)
- 1934 – IXL 9.8 (72) d Derby 5.13 (43)
- 1935 – North d ?

=== Derwent Football Association (1902–1908) ===
Clubs included Fitzroy, Cananore, Lefroy Juniors, Crescent, Bellerive, Queen's College, Officer College, Imperials, Union, New Town, Holebrook, Standfast, East Hobart and Trinity.

Premiership Winners

- 1902 – Fitzroy
- 1903 – Lefroy Juniors
- 1904 – Cananore
- 1905 – Crescent
- 1906 – Imperials
- 1907 – Bellerive
- 1908 – Crescent

=== Derwent Juniors Football Association ===
Clubs included Imperials, Lefroy Juniors, Cananore Juniors, and Bellerive.

=== Dunorlan Football Association (1935-1936) ===
Known as the Central Football Association in 1935.

Final clubs

Club	Colours	Nickname	Home Ground	Former league	Est.	Years in DFA	DFA Senior Premierships		Fate
Club	Colours	Nickname	Home Ground	Former league	Est.	Years in DFA	Total	Years	Fate
Beulah				KFA		1935-1936	0	-	Folded after 1936 season
Kimberley Robins		Robins	Kimberley Football Ground, Kimberley	–		1935-1936	0	-	Folded after 1936 season
Sunnyside (Merseylea 1935)				KFA		1935-1936	1	1936	1937-38 unaffiliated, joined Chudleigh FA in 1939

Former clubs

Club	Colours	Nickname	Home Ground	Former league	Est.	Years in DFA	DFA Senior Premierships		Fate
Club	Colours	Nickname	Home Ground	Former league	Est.	Years in DFA	Total	Years	Fate
Weegena	Dark and light hoops		Weegena Recreation Ground, Weegena	CFA	1902	1935	0	-	Folded after 1935 season

Premierships

- 1935 – ?
- 1936 – Sunnyside 10.6 (66) d Beulah 1.5 (11)

=== East Coast Football Association (1945–1958) ===
The East Coast Football Association was based on Tasmania's east coast. The competition went into recess five rounds into the 1958 season and ultimately folded at the completion of that season.

==== Final clubs ====
Club	Colours	Nickname	Home Ground	Former league	Est.	Years in ECFA	ECFA Senior Premierships		Fate
Club	Colours	Nickname	Home Ground	Former league	Est.	Years in ECFA	Total	Years	Fate
Buckland-Orford			Buckland Park, Buckland and Orford Recreation Ground, Orford	–		1947-1958	1	1948	Folded during 1958 season
Swansea		Swans	Swansea Oval, Swansea	–	1890s	1947-1958	6	1949, 1951, 1953, 1955, 1956, 1957	Recess in 1959-1960, re-formed in Fingal District FA in 1959
Triabunna (Spring Bay 1946)		Kangaroos	Triabunna Recreation Ground, Triabunna		1900	1945-1958	4	1946, 1947, 1950, 1952	Moved to South East District FA in 1959

==== Former clubs ====
Club	Colours	Nickname	Home Ground	Former league	Est.	Years in ECFA	ECFA Senior Premierships		Fate
Club	Colours	Nickname	Home Ground	Former league	Est.	Years in ECFA	Total	Years	Fate
Copping		Blues	Bream Creek Showgrounds, Copping	PFA	1884	1946	0	-	Returned to Pembroke FA in 1947
Cranbrook			Cranbrook Football Ground, Cranbrook	–	1947	1948-1949	0	-	Folded after 1949 season
Forcett			Forcett Recreation Ground, Forcett	–	1884	1945-1946, 1956	0	-	Moved to Pembroke FA in 1947
Nugent			Nugent Football Ground, Nugent	–	1935	1945-1946	1	1945	Moved to Pembroke FA in 1947
Sorell		Magpies	Sorell Memorial Oval, Sorell	CSDFA	1883	1953-1955	1	1954	Moved to South East District FA in 1959
Woodsdale		Lions	Wallaby Park, Woodsdale		1902	1946	0	-	Entered recess in 1947

Premiership Winners

- 1945 – Nugent d Triabunna
- 1946 – Spring Bay 8.7 (55) d Copping 4.13 (37)
- 1947 – Triabunna d Orford-Buckland (18 points)
- 1948 – Buckland-Orford 10.11 (71) d Triabunna 9.12 (66)
- 1949 – Swansea d Triabunna (10 points)
- 1950 – Triabunna 9.10 (64) d Buckland-Orford 6.17 (53)
- 1951 – Swansea 6.24 (60) d Triabunna 6.20 (56)
- 1952 – Triabunna 19.8 (122) d Swansea 8.20 (68)
- 1953 – Swansea d Triabunna (45 points)
- 1954 – Sorell 13.14 (92) d Swansea 12.15 (87)
- 1955 – Swansea 12.9 (81) d Triabunna 7.11 (53)
- 1956 – Swansea 10.15 (75) d Triabunna 10.10 (70)
- 1957 – Swansea 10.15 (75) d Triabunna 9.9 (63)

=== East Coast Football Union (1931-1932) ===
The East Coast Football Union was formed in 1931 when St Marys left the Fingal District Football Association to form a larger association on the north east coast with the clubs of the Portland FA. The ECFU only lasted two seasons, with St Marys' forfeiture of the 1932 grand final spelling the end of its brief existence.

Clubs

Club	Colours	Nickname	Home Ground	Former league	Est.	Years in ECFU	ECFU Senior Premierships		Fate
Club	Colours	Nickname	Home Ground	Former league	Est.	Years in ECFU	Total	Years	Fate
St Helens		Swans	St Helens Recreation Reserve, St Helens	PFA	1910	1931-1932	1	1932	Returned to Portland FA in 1933
St Marys		Tigers	St Marys Recreation Ground, St Marys	FDFA	1890	1931-1932	1	1931	Moved to Cullenswood FA in 1933
Union Rovers			Pyengana Recreation Ground, Pyengana	PFA	1907	1931-1932	0	-	Returned to Portland FA in 1933

Premierships

- 1931 – St Marys 8.11 (59) d St Helens 8.10 (58)
- 1932 – St Helens d St Marys (forfeit)

=== East Devon Football Association (1905–?) ===
Formed in 1905. Clubs included Moriarty, Sassafras, Harford and Latrobe.

=== Eastern Football Association (1922) ===
The Eastern Football Association was a short-lived competition featuring Fingal, St Helens and St Marys. The compeition lapsed after the 1922 season

Clubs

Club	Colours	Nickname	Home Ground	Former league	Est.	Years in EFA	EFA Senior Premierships		Fate
Club	Colours	Nickname	Home Ground	Former league	Est.	Years in EFA	Total	Years	Fate
Fingal		Blues	Fingal Recreation Ground, Fingal	–	1884	1931-1932	0	-	Unaffiliated in 1923, formed Fingal District FA in 1924
St Helens		Swans	St Helens Recreation Reserve, St Helens	PFA	1910	1931-1932	0	-	Unaffiliated in 1923, returned to Portland FA in 1924
St Marys		Tigers	St Marys Recreation Ground, St Marys	–	1890	1931-1932	0	-	Unaffiliated in 1923, formed Fingal District FA in 1924

Premierships

- 1922 – Unknown

=== Elizabeth Town Football Association (1925-1926) ===
Final clubs

Club	Colours	Nickname	Home Ground	Former league	Est.	Years in ETFA	ETFA Senior Premierships		Fate
Club	Colours	Nickname	Home Ground	Former league	Est.	Years in ETFA	Total	Years	Fate
Dunorlan	Dark and light hoops		Weegena Recreation Ground, Weegena	CFA	1902	1925-1926	1	1925	Returned to Central FA in 1927
Elizabeth Town			Railton Recreation Reserve, Railton	–	1925	1925-1926	0	-	Entered recess in 1927. Re-formed in Central FA in 1944
Kimberley			Kimberley Recreation Ground, Kimberley	–	1902	1926	0	-	Unaffilated 1927-29. Joined Latrobe FL in 1930

Former clubs

Club	Colours	Nickname	Home Ground	Former league	Est.	Years in ETFA	ETFA Senior Premierships		Fate
Club	Colours	Nickname	Home Ground	Former league	Est.	Years in ETFA	Total	Years	Fate
Chudleigh			Chudleigh Showgrounds, Chudleigh	–	1919	1925	0	-	Formed Chudleigh FA in 1926
Parkham			Hedley Walker's paddock, Parkham	–	1902	1925	0	-	Unaffiliated in 1926

Premiership Winners

- 1925 – Dunorlan
- 1926 – ?

=== Emu Bay Football League (1942) ===
Formed in 1942 and lasted just that season.
Premiership Winners

- 1942 – Emu Bay

=== Esperance Football Association (1922–1967) ===
Also known as Southport Football Association (1926) and Southern Football Association (1993-1935)

=== Federal Football League (1902) ===
Formed in 1902 and lasted just that season. Clubs included Emu Bay and Penguin.

Premiership Winners

- 1902 – Emu Bay d Penguin

=== Flinders Island Football Association ===
Teams comprised North Flinders Island and South Flinders Island. Games were played at Whitemark.

=== Franklin Football Association ===
Competing clubs unknown.

=== George Town Football League ===
Competing clubs included George Town, Hillwood and Lefroy.

Premiership Winners

- 1932 – Lefroy 15.14 (104) d Hillwood 5.3 (33)

=== Greater Northern Football League (1981–1982) ===
The Greater Northern Football League (GNFL) was a competition played between the fifteen major football clubs across Northern Tasmania from the two major footballing bodies across the north of the state, the Northern Tasmanian Football Association (NTFA), and the North West Football Union (NWFU) in 1981 and 1982.

=== Hobart Central Football Association ===
Clubs included Derwent, Lenah Valley, Sandy Bay Rovers, and Glenorchy.

=== Hobart Football Association ===
Clubs included Old Hobartians, West Hobart, University, and Postal Electricians.

=== Hobart Junior Football Association (1906–1909) ===
(Changed name to Southern Tasmanian Football Association in 1910)

Clubs included: Collingwood, Empire, Derwent, North Hobart Juniors, Hobart Central and Crescent "B".

Premiership Winners

- 1906 – Collingwood
- 1907 – Collingwood
- 1908 – Collingwood
- 1909 –

=== Holebrook Football Association (1906–1910) ===
Clubs included: Training College, Presbyterian, Melville Street, New Town, Rovers and Buckingham.
Premiership Winners

- 1906 – Training College
- 1907 –
- 1908 – Presbyterians
- 1909 – Training College
- 1910 – Buckingham

=== Huon District Football Association (1946–1950) ===
The Huon District Football Association was formed in 1946 to provide a competition for small clubs based around the town of Huonville in southern Tasmania. The competition's existence was brief, ending after the 1950 season.

==== Final clubs ====
Club	Colours	Nickname	Home Ground	Former League	Est.	Years in HDFA	HDFA Senior Premierships		Fate
Club	Colours	Nickname	Home Ground	Former League	Est.	Years in HDFA	Total	Years	Fate
Crabtree			Crabtree Football Ground, Crabtree	–	1949	1949-1950	1	1949	Folded after 1950 season
Glen Huon			Glen Huon Football Ground, Glen Huon	HJFA	1912	1946-1950	2	1947, 1948	Folded after 1950 season
Grove				–	1950	1950	0	-	Folded after 1950 season
Ranelagh			Ranelagh Recreation Ground, Ranelagh	HJFA		1946-1950	1	1946	Folded after 1950 season

==== Former clubs ====
Club	Colours	Nickname	Home Ground	Former League	Est.	Years in HDFA	HDFA Senior Premierships		Fate
Club	Colours	Nickname	Home Ground	Former League	Est.	Years in HDFA	Total	Years	Fate
Mountain River			Mountain River Football Ground, Mountain River		1920	1946-1948	0	-	Folded after 1948 season

Premiership Winners

- 1946 – Ranelagh 12.7 (79) d Mountain River 5.3 (33)
- 1947 – Glen Huon d Mountain River
- 1948 – Glen Huon 11.13 (79) d Mountain River 10.6 (66)
- 1949 – Crabtree d Ranelagh
- 1950 – unknown

=== Kentish Football Association (1904–1954) ===
Also known as Roland Football Association (1904-1910, 1915-1925) and Wilmot Football Association (1911-1914)

=== Kermandie Football Association (1912) ===
The Kermandie Football Association was formed when the Kermandie Football Club were late registering for the Huon Football Association in 1912, and subsequently were left out of the fixture. The club formed a small local association for the 1912 season, which disbanded the following year when they were re-admitted to the Huon FA.

==== Clubs ====
Club	Colours	Nickname	Home Ground	Former League	Est.	Years in KFA	KFA Senior Premierships		Fate
Club	Colours	Nickname	Home Ground	Former League	Est.	Years in KFA	Total	Years	Fate
Castle Forbes Bay			Kermandie Football Oval, Geeveston	–	1912	1912	0	-	Folded after 1912 season
Geeveston			Kermandie Football Oval, Geeveston	–	1912	1912	0	-	Folded after 1912 season
Kermandie		Robins	Kermandie Football Oval, Geeveston	HFA	1887	1912	1	1912	Re-joined Huon FA in 1913

=== Latrobe Football Association (1925–1953) ===
Clubs included Deloraine, Harford, Latrobe Rovers, Railton, Cement Rovers, Goliath, Sassafras, Sheffield and Moriarty.

Premiership Winners

- 1925 – Railton
- 1926 – Sassafras
- 1927 – Latrobe Rovers
- 1928 – Sassafras
- 1929 – Railton
- 1930 – Railton
- 1931 – Cement Rovers
- 1932 – Railton
- 1933 – Railton
- 1934 – Railton
- 1935 – Sassafras
- 1936 – Goliath
- 1937 – Railton
- 1938 – Deloraine
- 1939 – Railton
- 1940 –
- 1941 – Competition suspended (World War II)
- 1942 – Competition suspended (World War II)
- 1943 – Competition suspended (World War II)
- 1944 – Competition suspended (World War II)
- 1945 – Competition suspended (World War II)
- 1946 –
- 1947 –
- 1948 – Moriarty
- 1949 – Sassafras
- 1950 – Sassafras
- 1951 – Sassafras
- 1952 – Moriarty
- 1953 – Latrobe United

=== Lilydale District Football Association (1921–1937) ===
Competing clubs included: Lilydale, Lebrina, Karoola, Tunnel, Pipers River, Bangor, Nabowla, Scottsdale, Scottsdale Juniors and Bridstowe Rovers.

Premiership Winners

- 1921 – Lebrina
- 1922 –
- 1923 – Lilydale 7.0 (42) d Bangor 1.6 (12)
- 1924 –
- 1925 –
- 1926 – Scottsdale Jrs d Lebrina (18 points)
- 1927 –
- 1928 – Lilydale 7.6 (48) d Scottsdale Jrs 6.11 (47)
- 1929 –
- 1930 –
- 1931 –
- 1932 –
- 1933 – Lebrina 8.6 (54) d Karoola 8.5 (53)
- 1934 –
- 1935 –
- 1936 –
- 1937 – Scottsdale 10.11 (71) d Lilydale 10.7 (67)

=== Lower Derwent Football Association (1924–1939) ===
Known as New Norfolk Junior Football Association between 1924-1932.

Final clubs

Club	Colours	Nickname	Home Ground	Former League	Est.	Years in LDFA	LDFA Senior Premierships		Fate
Club	Colours	Nickname	Home Ground	Former League	Est.	Years in LDFA	Total	Years	Fate
Lachlan	(1927-?) Dark with light stripes (1933) Black with light trim (1939)		Lachlan Park Oval, New Norfolk	DVFA	1920	1927-1933, 1939	1	1939	Moved to Derwent Valley FA in 1934. Moved to Tyenna FA after WWII.
Molesworth			Molesworth Football Ground, Molesworth	DVFA	1920	1932-1933, 1939	0	-	Moved to Derwent Valley FA in 1934. Moved to Tyenna FA after WWII.
New Norfolk Rovers			Boyer Oval, New Norfolk	–	1939	1939	0	-	Moved to Southern Districts FA in 1940
Plenty			Plenty Football Ground, Plenty	DVFA	1920	1929-1930, 1932-1933, 1939	0	-	Recess in 1931. Moved to Derwent Valley FA in 1934 and after WWII.

Former clubs

Club	Colours	Nickname	Home Ground	Former League	Est.	Years in LDFA	LDFA Senior Premierships		Fate
Club	Colours	Nickname	Home Ground	Former League	Est.	Years in LDFA	Total	Years	Fate
Lower Derwent			Boyer Oval, New Norfolk	–	1927	1927-1933	2	1932, 1933	Moved to Derwent Valley FA in 1934.
New Norfolk Juniors			Boyer Oval, New Norfolk	–	1878	1924, 1927-1931	3	1924, 1929, 1930	?
Rovers			Boyer Oval, New Norfolk	–	1924	1924	0	-	Folded after 1924 season
Wanderers			Boyer Oval, New Norfolk	–	1924	1924	0	-	Folded after 1924 season

Premiership Winners

- 1924 – New Norfolk Juniors
- 1925 – Competition in recess
- 1926 – Competition in recess
- 1927 – ?
- 1928 – ?
- 1929 – New Norfolk Juniors
- 1930 – New Norfolk Juniors
- 1931 – ?
- 1932 – Lower Derwent 7.8 (50) d Lachlan 4.16 (40)
- 1933 – Lower Derwent 9.8 (62) d Molesworth 6.8 (44)
- 1934 – Competition in recess
- 1935 – Competition in recess
- 1936 – Competition in recess
- 1937 – Competition in recess
- 1938 – Competition in recess
- 1939 – Lachlan 2.4 (16) d Plenty 1.5 (11)

=== Lyell Miners Football Association (1907−1932) ===
Final clubs

Club	Colours	Nickname	Home Ground	Former League	Est.	Years in LMFA	LMFA Senior Premierships		Fate
Club	Colours	Nickname	Home Ground	Former League	Est.	Years in LMFA	Total	Years	Fate
City			Gormanston Oval, Gormanston	–	1937	1937	0	-	Folded after 1937 season
Imperial			Gormanston Oval, Gormanston	–	1937	1937	0	-	Folded after 1937 season
Linda			Linda Football Ground, Linda	LDFA	1900	1909-1924, 1927-1932, 1937	3	1907, 1923, 1937	Unaffiliated in 1925-26. Recess between 1933-36, merged with Mines United in Queenstown FA in 1937

Former clubs

Club	Colours	Nickname	Home Ground	Former League	Est.	Years in LMFA	LMFA Senior Premierships		Fate
Club	Colours	Nickname	Home Ground	Former League	Est.	Years in LMFA	Total	Years	Fate
Comstock			Gormanston Oval, Gormanston	–	1932	1932	0	-	Folded after 1932 season
Gormanston		Blues, Mountain Men, Wrens	Gormanston Oval, Gormanston	–	1900	1907-1908, 1910, 1913-1924, 1932	1	1932	Recesses in 1909 and 1911-12. Replaced by Rovers, Wanderers and Stars in 1925. Moved to Queenstown FA in 1933
Imperials			Gormanston Oval, Gormanston	–	1909	1909-1915	1	1912	Folded after 1915 season
Miners			Gormanston Oval, Gormanston	–	1919	1919-1924	2	1920, 1924	Replaced by Rovers, Wanderers and Stars in 1925.
North Lyell			Linda Football Ground, Linda	–	1905	1907-1912	2	1908, 1909	Folded after 1912 season
Rovers			Gormanston Oval, Gormanston	–	1925	1925-1931	1	1927, 1928, 1929	Merged with Wanderers to re-form Gormanston in 1932
Stars			Gormanston Oval, Gormanston	–	1925	1925-1927	0	-	Folded after 1927 season
Wanderers			Gormanston Oval, Gormanston	–	1925	1925-1931	1	1926	Merged with Rovers to re-form Gormanston in 1932

Premiership Winners

- 1907 – Linda
- 1908 – North Lyell
- 1909 – North Lyell
- 1910 – ?
- 1911 – ?
- 1912 – Imperials
- 1913 – ?
- 1914 – ?
- 1915 – ?
- 1916-18 – Recess (WWI)
- 1919 – ?
- 1920 – Miners
- 1921 – ?
- 1922 – ?
- 1923 – Linda
- 1924 – Miners
- 1925 – ?
- 1926 – Wanderers
- 1927 – Rovers
- 1928 – Rovers
- 1929 – Rovers
- 1930 – ?
- 1931 – ?
- 1932 – Gormanston
- 1933-36 – Recess
- 1937 – Linda

=== Marrawah Football Association (1923−1931) ===
Clubs included: Centrals, Railway, West, Marrawah, East Marrawah and Welcome Swamp Reclaimers.

Premiership Winners

- 1923 – Marrawah
- 1924 –
- 1925 – East Marrawah
- 1926 – Redpa
- 1927 –
- 1928 – Marrawah
- 1929 – Competition in recess
- 1930 – Competition in recess
- 1931 – Competition in recess

=== Midhurst Football Association (1907–1910) ===
Association formed 1907.
Clubs included: Deloraine, Dunorlan, Elizabeth Town, Railton, Red Hills and Westbury Wanderers.

Premiership Winners

- 1907 -
- 1908 - Railton
- 1909 – Deloraine 6.7 (43) d Dunorlan 2.7 (19)
- 1910 – Westbury Wanderers

=== Metropolitan Football Association (1910–1929) ===
Clubs included: Battery Point, Glebe, Bellerive, Old Hobartians Association and Old Virgilians Association.
OVA were later referred to as St Virgils.

Premiership Winners

- 1910 – Bellerive were defeated
- 1915 – Bellerive
- 1929 – OHA 13.6 (84) d OVA 4.12 (36)

Note:
No information is available on Seasons' 1911–1914 or 1916–1928.

=== Mount Farrell Football Association (1912–1936) ===
(Tullah Football Association)

As Tullah was in the early 20th century an isolated community, teams were made up from the township of Tullah only.

With the construction of the Murchison Highway in 1963 a combined Tullah team competed in the Rosebery FA, Murchison FA, and Western Tasmanian FA competitions at different times until folding in 1988.

The competition commenced in 1912.
Teams included: Rovers, Tigers, City, Tullah, Federal, Wanderers and Zeehan.

Premiership Winners

- 1912 –
- 1913 –
- 1914 –
- 1915 –
- 1916 – Competition suspended (World War I)
- 1917 – Competition suspended (World War I)
- 1918 – Competition suspended (World War I)
- 1919 – Competition suspended (Influenza outbreak)
- 1920 –
- 1921 –
- 1922 –
- 1923 – Federal 6.5 (41) d Wanderers 3.6 (24)
- 1924 –
- 1925 –
- 1926 –
- 1927 – Federal
- 1928 –
- 1929 –
- 1930 –
- 1931 – Tullah 8.20 (68) d Federal 9.9 (63)
- 1932 – Tullah d Federal
- 1933 – Rovers 15.20 (110) d City 13.11 (89)
- 1934 – Rovers
- 1935 – Tullah 16.24 (120) d Federal 12.14 (86)
- 1936 – Rosebery 5.16 (46) d Zeehan 4.10 (34)

=== Mount Stronach Football Association (1932–1936) ===
The Mount Stronach Football Association was formed in 1932 and was based in the north-east of Tasmania around the town of Scottsdale.

==== Final clubs ====
Club	Colours	Nickname	Home Ground	Former League	Est.	Years in MSFA	MSFA Senior Premierships		Fate
Club	Colours	Nickname	Home Ground	Former League	Est.	Years in MSFA	Total	Years	Fate
Bridport		Seasiders	Bridport Football Oval, Bridport	–	1932	1932-1936	2	1935, 1936	Folded after 1936 season. Re-formed in NEFU in 1967.
Nabowla			Nabowla Football Ground, Nabowla	–	1922	1934-1936	1	1934	Formed Scottsdale-Nabowla-Lilydale FA in 1937
Scottsdale Ramblers		Ramblers	Scottsdale Oval, Scottsdale	–	1933	1933-1936	0	-	Folded after 1936 season
Warrentinna (IXL 1935)			Warrentinna Football Ground, Warrentinna	–	1935	1935-1936	0	-	Moved to NEFU in 1937

==== Former clubs ====
Club	Colours	Nickname	Home Ground	Former League	Est.	Years in MSFA	MSFA Senior Premierships		Fate
Club	Colours	Nickname	Home Ground	Former League	Est.	Years in MSFA	Total	Years	Fate
Forester Settlement	Dark with light vee			–		1932	0	-	Folded after 1932 season
Lietinna			Lietinna Football Ground, Lietinna	–	1932	1932-1933	0	-	Folded after 1933 season
Springfield			Springfield Recreation Ground, Springfield	–	1922	1932-1934	2	1932, 1933	Recess between 1935-44. Re-formed in Scottsdale Junior FA in 1945.

==== Premierships ====
- 1932 – Springfield 10.10 (70) d Forester 5.13 (43)
- 1933 – Springfield 9.15 (69) d Lietinna 9.7 (61)
- 1934 – Nabowla 13.11 (89) d Springfield 13.4 (82)
- 1935 – Bridport 10.10 (70) d Nabowla 6.5 (41)
- 1936 – Bridport 15.18 (108) d Warrentinna 13.6 (84)

=== Murchison Football Association (1973–1982) ===
The Murchison Football Association was formed in 1973 by the Zeehan Football Club, which had re-formed after a period of recess and sought to enter the Western Tasmanian Football Association. This iteration of the competition lasted until 1975, after which both Zeehan and Tullah were admitted to the WTFA. The competition was re-formed in 1981 by Savage River, Luina and Waratah, but would only last two seasons before disappearing again.

==== Final clubs ====
Club	Colours	Nickname	Home Ground	Former League	Est.	Years in MFA	MFA Senior Premierships		Fate
Club	Colours	Nickname	Home Ground	Former League	Est.	Years in MFA	Total	Years	Fate
Luina			Waratah Football Ground, Waratah	–	1981	1981-1982	0	-	Folded after 1982 season
Savage River		Tigers	Waratah Football Ground, Waratah	–	1973	1973-1975, 1981-1982	2	1981, 1982	Folded after 1982 season
Waratah		Blues	Waratah Football Ground, Waratah	–	1981	1981-1982	0	-	Folded after 1982 season

==== Former clubs ====
Club	Colours	Nickname	Home Ground	Former League	Est.	Years in MFA	MFA Senior Premierships		Fate
Club	Colours	Nickname	Home Ground	Former League	Est.	Years in MFA	Total	Years	Fate
Luina-Waratah		Blues	Waratah Football Ground, Waratah	–	1973	1973-1975	0	-	De-merged into Waratah and Luina in 1981.
Tullah		Roos	Tullah Oval, Tullah	RFA	1930	1973-1975	2	1974, 1975	Joined Western Tasmanian FA in 1976
Zeehan		Bulldogs	Zeehan Cricket Ground, Zeehan	RFA	1896	1973-1975	1	1973	Joined Western Tasmanian FA in 1976

==== Premierships ====
- 1973 – Zeehan
- 1974 – Tullah
- 1975 – Tullah
- 1976–1980 – MFA in recess
- 1981 – Savage River
- 1982 – Savage River

=== North Eastern Football Union (1907–2017) ===
Also known as North East Coast Football Association (1907) and North Eastern Football Association (1908-1924, 1930-1936)

=== North West Football Union (1910−1986) ===
The North West Football Union (NWFU) was an Australian rules football competition which ran from 1910 to 1986. In its time it was one of the three main leagues in Tasmania, with the Tasmanian Football League and Northern Tasmanian Football Association representing the rest of the state.

The NWFU ran until the end of the 1986 season when major clubs such as Cooee and Devonport defected to the TFL Statewide League. In 1987 the NWFU merged with the Northern Tasmanian Football Association (NTFA) to form the Northern Tasmanian Football League.

=== North West Christian Amateur Football League (1987–2000) ===
The North West Christian Amateur Football League (NWCAFL) was formed in early 1987 by Mal Metcalf with the goal of creating a football competition based on Christian conduct and values. The first season saw 4 teams aligned with churches in and around the Burnie region competing. By 1988 the competition had expanded to include a club from Smithton (Circular Head) and from the Leven region (Leven Hawks), and later saw the admission of a Devonport-based club (Eastside, later Mersey). Initially games were played at the Wynyard and Parkland High School ovals but the NWCAFL gained use of the Wivenhoe Showground for its matches in the early 1990s.

Beginning in the mid 1990s, the competition was dominated by the Burnie-based Brooklyn Tigers, who won 8 premierships and were the only team to compete in every season. Towards the end of the 20th century some clubs began to struggle for numbers, ultimately resulting in the competition and its remaining clubs folding at the end of the 2000 season.

==== Final clubs ====
Club	Colours	Nickname	Est.	Years in NWCAFL	NWCAFL Senior Premierships		Fate
Club	Colours	Nickname	Est.	Years in NWCAFL	Total	Years	Fate
Boat Harbour (Boat Harbour Gospel Hall 1987)		Sharks	1987	1987-1994, 1996-2000	3	1987, 1988, 1989	Recess in 1995-96. Folded after 2000 season.
Brooklyn (Burnie Apostolics 1987)		Tigers	1987	1987-2000	8	1990, 1991, 1995, 1996, 1997, 1998, 1999, 2000	Folded after 2000 season
Central Coast		Swans	1995	1995-2000	0	-	Folded after 2000 season
Mersey (Eastside 1994-97)	(1994-97)(1998-2000)	Magpies	1994	1994-2000	0	-	Folded after 2000 season

==== Former clubs ====
Club	Colours	Nickname	Est.	Years in NWCAFL	NWCAFL Senior Premierships		Fate
Club	Colours	Nickname	Est.	Years in NWCAFL	Total	Years	Fate
Circular Head		Seagulls	1988	1988-1993	1	1992	Folded after 1993 season
City (Seabrook 1996-97)	(1988-95)(1996-98)	Hawks	1988	1988-1998	1	1994	Folded after 1998 season
Leven Hawks		Hawks	1988	1988-1993	1	1993	Folded after 1993 season
Ridgley-Acton Brethren			1987	1987	0	-	Folded after 1987 season
Yolla Baptist			1987	1987	0	-	Folded after 1987 season

==== Premierships ====
- 1987 – Boat Harbour 8.9 (57) d Burnie Apostolics 8.4 (52)
- 1988 – Boat Harbour 9.3 (57) d Leven Hawks 3.8 (26)
- 1989 – Boat Harbour 14.12 (96) d Circular Head 9.9 (63)
- 1990 – Brooklyn 10.6 (76) d Circular Head 6.19 (55)
- 1991 – Brooklyn 14.11 (95) d 8.8 (56)
- 1992 – Circular Head 25.18 (168) d Boat Harbour 14.17 (101)
- 1993 – Leven Hawks 13.18 (96) d City 9.14 (68)
- 1994 – City 13.12 (90) d Brooklyn 10.19 (79)
- 1995 – Brooklyn 12.6 (78) d Central Coast 10.12 (72)
- 1996 – Brooklyn 9.12 (66) d Eastside 6.7 (43)
- 1997 – Brooklyn 16.12 (108) d Central Coast 8.8 (56)
- 1998 – Brooklyn 11.5 (71) d Boat Harbou 5.7 (37)
- 1999 – Brooklyn 8.6 (54) d Boat Harbour 1.3 (9)
- 2000 – Brooklyn 10.7 (67) d Boat Harbour 3.11 (29)

=== Northern Suburban Football Association (1924) ===
Clubs included: Druids, South Launceston, Caledonians, East Launceston.

Premiership Winners

- 1924 – Druids

=== Northern Tasmanian Football Association (1886−1986) ===
The Northern Tasmanian Football Association (NTFA) was an Australian rules football competition which ran from 1886 to 1986. In its time it was one of the three main leagues in Tasmania and was based in the Launceston and surrounding districts.

Two teams (North Launceston and East Launceston) were to field reserve grade teams at senior level in the competition in 1986 upon joining the TFL Statewide League with a third club – City-South – merging with East Launceston on 26 May 1986.
In 1987 the NTFA merged with the North West Football Union (NWFU) to form the Northern Tasmanian Football League, losing both North Launceston and the merged East Launceston/City-South (South Launceston) club.

=== Northern Tasmania District Football League (1952−1963) ===
The Northern Tasmanian District Football League was formed in late 1951 after the NTFA expelled second XVIII clubs so it could hold its own reserve grade competition. Players were only permitted to play with the club that represented the district of their residence. The NTDFL folded after the 1963 season.

==== Final clubs ====
Club	Colours	Nickname	Home Ground	Former League	Est.	Years in NTDFL	NTDFL Senior Premierships		Fate
Club	Colours	Nickname	Home Ground	Former League	Est.	Years in NTDFL	Total	Years	Fate
Deloraine		Magpies	Deloraine Recreation Ground, Deloraine	NTFA 2nds	1894	1952-1963	5	1952, 1958, 1959, 1961, 1962	Joined TAFL Northern Division in 1964
Kings Meadows			Youngtown Recreation Ground, Youngtown	NTFA 2nds	1951	1952-1963	0	-	Joined TAFL Northern Division in 1964
Mowbray		Eagles	Birdwood Oval, Brooks High School, Rocherlea	TAFLN	1923	1953-1963	5	1954, 1955, 1956, 1957, 1963	Returned to TAFL Northern Division in 1964
St Leonards			St Leonards Reserve, St Leonards	NTFA 2nds	1950	1953-1963	1	1953	Folded after 1963 season
Westbury		Tigers	Westbury Recreation Ground, Westbury	NTFA 2nds	1902	1952-1963	0	-	Moved to Esk FA in 1964

==== Former clubs ====
Club	Colours	Nickname	Home Ground	Former League	Est.	Years in NTDFL	NTDFL Senior Premierships		Fate
Club	Colours	Nickname	Home Ground	Former League	Est.	Years in NTDFL	Total	Years	Fate
Riverside			Windsor Park, Riverside	NTFA 2nds	1950	1952-1961	1	1960	Folded after 1961 season

Premiership Winners

- 1952 – Deloraine 9.18 (72) d Westbury 6.4 (40)
- 1953 – St Leonards 6.12 (48) d Mowbray 3.11 (29)
- 1954 – Mowbray 7.18 (60) d St Leonards 8.11 (59)
- 1955 – Mowbray 18.7 (115) d Riverside 7.10 (52)
- 1956 – Mowbray 15.13 (103) d Deloraine 7.14 (56)
- 1957 – Mowbray 14.10 (94) d Deloraine 9.18 (72)
- 1958 – Deloraine 17.16 (118) d Mowbray 13.11 (89)
- 1959 – Deloraine 12.27 (99) d Mowbray 14.8 (92)
- 1960 – Riverside 9.12 (66) d Westbury 6.11 (47)
- 1961 – Deloraine 14.15 (99) d Westbury 9.9 (63)
- 1962 – Deloraine 12.19 (91) d Mowbray 5.21 (51)
- 1963 – Mowbray 12.13 (85) d Westbury 10.9 (69)

=== Oatlands District (Junior) Football Association (1932–1938) ===
Clubs included: Mt Pleasant, Oatlands, Tunnack, Tunbridge, Mt Seymour and Parratah.

Premiership Winners

- 1932 – Oatlands 12.10 (82) d Tunnack 8.11 (59)
- 1933 –
- 1934 –
- 1935 –
- 1936 –
- 1937 – Tunnack d Mt Seymour
- 1938 – Mt Pleasant d Oatlands

=== Pembroke Football Association (1933−1950) ===
==== Final clubs ====
Club	Colours	Nickname	Home Ground	Former league	Est.	Years in PFA	PFA Senior Premierships		Fate
Club	Colours	Nickname	Home Ground	Former league	Est.	Years in PFA	Total	Years	Fate
Copping (Bream Creek 1933-36)		Blues	Copping Oval, Copping	ECFA	1884	1933-1936, 1947-1950	1	1948	Played in East Coast FA in 1946. Moved to Tasman FA in 1951.
Dunalley		Bulldogs	Dunalley Football Oval, Dunalley	TFA	1903	1937-1939, 1947-1950	2	1949, 1950	Moved to Tasman FA in 1951
Nugent			Nugent Football Ground, Nugent	ECFA	1935	1933-1939, 1947-1950	2	1934, 1936	Played in East Coast FA in 1946. Folded after 1950 season

==== Former clubs ====
Club	Colours	Nickname	Home Ground	Former league	Est.	Years in PFA	PFA Senior Premierships		Fate
Club	Colours	Nickname	Home Ground	Former league	Est.	Years in PFA	Total	Years	Fate
Forcett			Forcett Recreation Ground, Forcett	ECFA	1884	1936-1939, 1947-1948	1	1947	Played in East Coast FA in 1946. Moved to South East District FA in 1949
Sorell		Magpies	Sorell Memorial Oval, Sorell	CSDFA	1883	1933-1939	4	1933, 1937, 1938, 1939	Moved to South East District FA in 1945

Premiership Winners

The winning premiership team received the Bone Trophy.

- 1933 – Sorell
- 1934 – Nugent
- 1935 – ?
- 1936 – Nugent 6.4 (40) dw Forcett 6.4 (40)
- 1936 – Nugent d Forcett (4 points) *
- 1937 – Sorell 9.6 (60) d Nugent 7.7 (49)
- 1938 – Sorell 8.11 (59) d Nugent 7.8 (50)
- 1939 – Sorell 11.9 (75) d Dunalley 3.14 (32)
- 1940-1946 – Competition in recess (World War II)
- 1947 – Forcett 14.3 (87) d Dunalley 11.10 (76)
- 1948 – Copping 8.11 (59) d Dunalley 5.10 (40)
- 1949 – Dunalley d Copping
- 1950 – Dunalley d Nugent

Note:
The 1936 Grand Final resulted in a draw between Nugent and Forcett.
The two clubs played a replay the following week, again at Bream Creek, resulting in a 4-point victory to Nugent.

=== Portland Football Association (1936−1950) ===
The Portland Football Association teams included Anchor, City, George's Bay, Miners, Pyengana, St Helens, Union Rovers, and Weldborough.

Premiership Winners

- 1936 – Union Rovers
- 1937 – Miners
- 1938 – Pyengana
- 1939 – Anchor
- 1940 – Competition in recess (World War II)
- 1941 – Competition in recess (World War II)
- 1942 – Competition in recess (World War II)
- 1943 – Competition in recess (World War II)
- 1944 – Competition in recess (World War II)
- 1945 – Competition in recess (World War II)
- 1946 –
- 1947 – George's Bay 10.19 (79) d Pyengana 6.4 (40)
- 1948 – George's Bay 9.13 (67) d St Helens 8.18 (66)
- 1949 –
- 1950 – Pyengana 13.18 (96) d St Helens 7.5 (47)

=== Protestant Churches Football Association (1932−1934) ===
Clubs included: Baptists, Methodists, University, Congregationalists, Battery Point Methodists and Hobart Baptists.

Premiership Winners

- 1932 – Combined Methodists 16.11 (107) d University 14.8 (92)
- 1933 – Combined Methodists 13.12 (90) d Battery Point Methodists 9.12 (66)
- 1934 – Competition in recess

=== Public Service Football Association (1947−1951) ===
Clubs included: Hydro Electric, Public Works, Politax, Railways and Tasmanian Government Printers.

=== Queenborough Football Association (1930−1956) ===
Clubs included: Army, Blundstones, Canes, Cascade, Claremont, Elliotts Brothers, Glenorchy Grove, Glenorchy Seconds, High School, Hydro, IXL, Jay Bee, Kingston, Long Beach, Mount Nelson, North Hobart Rovers, Old Hobartians Association (OHA), Old Technical Collegians (OTC), Postal Workers, Railway, Sandy Bay Juniors, Sandy Bay Rovers, Sutex, Teachers College, Timms Bridge, University and YCW.

Premiership Winners

- 1930 – Mt Nelson d Sandy Bay Jrs
- 1931 – Sandy Bay Jrs 10.8 (68) d Mt Nelson 8.11 (59)
- 1932 – Long Beach 6.17 (53) d OHA 2.3 (15)
- 1933 – Long Beach 8.12 (60) d Sandy Bay Jrs 7.17 (59)
- 1934 – Long Beach 10.6 (66) d OHA 3.11 (29)
- 1935 – Long Beach 10.10 (70) d OHA 6.5 (41)
- 1936 – Long Beach 14.13 (97) d Sandy Bay Rovers 8.10 (58)
- 1937 – OHA 15.7 (97) d Long Beach 9.9 (63)
- 1938 – OHA 16.14 (110) d University 3.9 (27)
- 1939 – OTC 8.10 (58) d OHA 7.11 (53)
- 1940 – Timms Bridge 5.6 (36) d OTC 4.9 (33)
- 1941 – Navy 8.6 (54) d Long Beach 7.8 (50)
- 1942 – Long Beach 11.9 (75) d OHA 7.11 (53)
- 1943 – Army Supply 9.11 (65) d University 9.9 (63)
- 1944 – OHA 9.9 (63) d Long Beach 6.16 (52)
- 1945 – OHA 7.3 (45) d Long Beach 4.6 (30)
- 1946 – Claremont 10.21 (81) d IXL 8.12 (60)
- 1947 – Long Beach d IXL
- 1948 – IXL d Long Beach
- 1949 – Long Beach 8.10 (58) d IXL 5.9 (39)
- 1950 – Long Beach 5.14 (44) d IXL 5.7 (37)
- 1951 – IXL 6.7 (43) d Nth Hobart Rovers 4.7 (31)
- 1952 – IXL 2.9 (21) d Elliot Brothers 2.8 (20)
- 1953 – Nth Hobart Rovers 10.11 (71) d Elliot Brothers 3.3 (21)
- 1954 – Nth Hobart Rovers 13.13 (91) d Hydro 3.1 (19)
- 1955 – Nth Hobart Rovers 10.12 (72) d Canes 1.17 (23)
- 1956 – Canes 6.9 (45) d Glenorchy Seconds 2.9 (21)

=== Redpa Football Association (1933−1939) ===
Clubs included: Top End, Bottom End, Salmon River, Central, Railway, Marrawah, Redpa Wanderers.

Premiership Winners

- 1933 – Season abandoned
- 1934 – Central 8.7 (55) d Railway 1.4 (10)
- 1935 –
- 1936 –
- 1937 – Competition in recess
- 1938 –
- 1939 –

=== Richmond Football Association (1931–1936) ===
Clubs included: Richmond, Campania, Colebrook, Brighton, Bagdad, Kempton, Dunalley, Sandford, Sorell and Tea Tree.

Premiership Winners

- 1931 – Sandford d Bellerive
- 1932 – Campania 4.11 (35) d Tea Tree 3.8 (26)
- 1933 – Campania 9.13 (67) d Brighton 5.6 (36)
- 1934 – Kempton 11.14 (80) d Campania 8.5 (53)
- 1935 – Kempton 6.12 (48) dw Campania 7.6 (48)
- 1935 – Kempton 7.8 (50) d Campania 4.9 (33) *
- 1936 – Richmond 14.16 (100) d Campania 8.10 (58)

Note:
The 1935 Grand Final between Kempton and Campania ended in a draw with Kempton winning the replay the following week by 17 points.
Both Grand Finals were played at Richmond.
All clubs joined the Southern Midlands FA which had been reformed from 1937–1940.

=== Ridgley Football Association (1939−1951) ===
Clubs included: Highclere, Mooreville Road, Ridgley, West Ridgley, Tewkesbury, Wilmot.

Premiership Winners

- 1939 – Tewkesbury
- 1940 – Ridgley
- 1941 – Ridgley
- 1942 – Competition suspended (World War II)
- 1943 – Competition suspended (World War II)
- 1944 – Competition suspended (World War II)
- 1945 – Ridgley
- 1946 – West Ridgley
- 1947 – Ridgley
- 1948 – West Ridgley
- 1949 – Ridgley
- 1950 – Ridgley
- 1951 – Mooreville Road

Note:
Tewkesbury now known as Yolla.
Mooreville Road now known as Somerset.

=== Rosebery Football Association (1922−1962) ===
Clubs included: Rosebery, Strahan, Toorak, Tullah, Williamsford and Zeehan.
Rosebery and Toorak clubs amalgamated in 1987 to become Rosebery-Toorak.

Premiership Winners

- 1922 – Williamsford
- 1923 – Williamsford
- 1924 – Rosebery
- 1925 –
- 1926 – Williamsford
- 1927 – Rosebery
- 1928 – Toorak 10.9 (69) d Williamsford 9.13 (67)
- 1929 – Rosebery
- 1930 – Rosebery
- 1931 – Wiiliamsford
- 1932 – Toorak
- 1933 – Williamsford
- 1934 – Rosebery
- 1935 – Williamsford
- 1936 – Williamsford
- 1937 – Mines United 15.13 (103) d Toorak 10.17 (77)
- 1938 – Toorak 11.20 (86) d Mines United 5.6 (36)
- 1939 – Tullah
- 1940 – Renison Bell
- 1941 – Competition suspended (World War II)
- 1942 – Competition suspended (World War II)
- 1943 – Competition suspended (World War II)
- 1944 – Toorak 12.22 (94) d Rosebery 12.12 (84)
- 1945 – Tullah 17.20 (122) d Toorak 8.13 (61)
- 1946 – Toorak 23.10 (148) d Rosebery 8.12 (60)
- 1947 – Williamsford 15.14 (104) d Tullah 12.12 (84)
- 1948 – Tullah 19.21 (135) d Toorak 4.9 (33)
- 1949 – Rosebery 16.23 (119) d Zeehan 6.11 (47)
- 1950 – Tullah 13.26 (104) d Rosebery 10.15 (75)
- 1951 – Rosebery 24.14 (158) d Williamsford 7.11 (53)
- 1952 – Rosebery 12.12 (84) d Toorak 10.9 (69)
- 1953 – Toorak 9.10 (64) d Zeehan 4.9 (33)
- 1954 – Rosebery d Toorak
- 1955 – Rosebery 15.20 (110) d Williamsford 7.10 (52)
- 1956 – Williamsford 16.19 (115) d Rosebery 3.5 (23)
- 1957 –
- 1958 –
- 1959 –
- 1960 – Rosebery 11.14 (80) d Toorak 9.7 (61)
- 1961 – Rosebery 16.19 (115) d Toorak 8.4 (52)
- 1962 –

=== Sorell Football Association (1933−1935) ===
Clubs that competed in the competition included Nugent, Sorell, and Bream Creek.
All clubs moved to the Pembroke Football Association in 1936.

The Association's premiership cup was known as the McHugh Trophy.

Premiership Winners

- 1933 – Sorell 8.9 (57) d Nugent 8.5 (53)
- 1934 –
- 1935 –

=== Southern Country Football Association (1923−1937) ===
A forerunner to the Southern District Football Association which ran from 1934 to 1970.

Clubs included: Bothwell, Ellendale, Glenorchy Flyers, Lachlan, Molesworth, Montacute, New Norfolk, Oatlands, Ouse, Richmond, Rosegarland, Upper Derwent and Waterside Workers.

Premiership Winners

- 1923 – Oatlands 9.11 (65) d Richmond 6.8 (44)
- 1924 – Competition in recess
- 1925 – Richmond 9.7 (61) d Oatlands 8.11 (59)
- 1926 – Richmond 11.11 (77) d Oatlands 10.15 (75)
- 1927 – Oatlands 11.20 (86) d New Norfolk 8.7 (55)
- 1928 – New Norfolk 9 9 (63) d Richmond 5.8 (38)
- 1929 – Upper Derwent 9.8 (62) d Oatlands 6.16 (52)
- 1930 – New Norfolk 16.5 (101) d Richmond 10.15 (75)
- 1931 – Bothwell 10.11 (71) d New Norfolk 7.13 (55)
- 1932 – Upper Derwent 12.12 (84) d New Norfolk 9.9 (63)
- 1933 – New Norfolk 11.4 (70) d Bothwell 7.8 (50)

=== Southern Country Junior Football Association (1934-1936) ===
Also known as the Bothwell District Football Association in 1934.

Final clubs

Club	Colours	Nickname	Home Ground	Former League	Est.	Years in SCJFA	SCJFA Senior Premierships		Fate
Club	Colours	Nickname	Home Ground	Former League	Est.	Years in SCJFA	Total	Years	Fate
Bothwell		Rabbits	Bothwell Recreation Reserve, Bothwell	SCFA	1880	1934-1936	1	1935	Joined Derwent Valley FA in 1937
Ellendale			Ellendale Football Ground, Ellendale	DVFA	1920	1935-1936	0	-	Joined Derwent Valley FA in 1937
Montacute	Light with one thick dark band with thin dark band on either side		Montacute Football Ground, Hollow Tree	–	1934	1934-1936	0	-	Folded after 1936 season
Ouse			Ouse Football Ground, Ouse	–	1935	1935-1936	1	1936	Joined Derwent Valley FA in 1937

Former clubs

Club	Colours	Nickname	Home Ground	Former League	Est.	Years in SCJFA	SCJFA Senior Premierships		Fate
Club	Colours	Nickname	Home Ground	Former League	Est.	Years in SCJFA	Total	Years	Fate
Dennistoun			Dennistoun Recreation Ground, Bothwell	–	1934	1934	0	-	Folded after 1934 season

Premiership Winners

- 1934 – ?
- 1935 – Bothwell 8.5 (53) d Montacute 6.14 (50)
- 1936 – Ouse 10.9 (69) d Montacute 6.1 (37)

=== Southern Districts Football Association (1934−1970) ===
Also known as Glenorchy Suburban Football Association (1924-1933)

=== Southern Tasmanian Football Association (1910) ===
Formerly the Hobart Junior Football Association

Clubs included: Crescent, Excelsior and Brisbane Rovers.

Premiership Winners

- 1910 – Excelsior

=== Southern Tasmanian Football Association (1976−1986) ===
The Southern Tasmanian Football Association (STFA) was formed in 1976 as essentially a continuation of the Associated Youth Clubs competition. The STFA's existence was brief, lasting only 11 seasons before folding in 1986 after a number of clubs disbanded.

==== Final clubs ====
Club	Colours	Nickname	Home Ground	Former League	Est.	Years in STFA	STFA Senior Premierships		Fate
Club	Colours	Nickname	Home Ground	Former League	Est.	Years in STFA	Total	Years	Fate
Bothwell		Rabbits	Bothwell Recreation Reserve, Bothwell	SEDFA	1880	1980-1986	2	1983, 1985	Moved to Oatlands District FA in 1987
Lachlan		Saints	Lachlan Park Oval, New Norfolk	AYC	1922	1976-1986	6	1976, 1979, 1980, 1981, 1984, 1986	Moved to TAFL Southern Division in 1987
Maydena	(1976-?)(?-1986)	Bulldogs	Maydena Sports Ground, Maydena	AYC	1952	1976-1986	0	-	Folded after 1986 season
North Derwent		Kangaroos	Hamilton Showgrounds, Hamilton	–	1984	1984-1986	0	-	Recess between 1987-90, re-formed in Tasman FA in 1991
Railway		Blues	Clare Street Oval, New Town	AYC	1876	1976-1986	1	1977	Recess between 1987-91, re-formed in Tasman FA in 1992
Upper Derwent			Gretna Football Ground, Gretna	SEDFA	1904	1980-1986	0	-	Folded after 1986 season
West Hobart		Hawks	West Hobart Recreation Ground, West Hobart	AYC	1895	1976-1986	1	1982	Folded after 1986 season

==== Former clubs ====
Club	Colours	Nickname	Home Ground	Former League	Est.	Years in STFA	STFA Senior Premierships		Fate
Club	Colours	Nickname	Home Ground	Former League	Est.	Years in STFA	Total	Years	Fate
Buckingham		Bucks	New Town Oval, New Town	TANFL U19s	1908	1976-?	1	1978	Folded at unknown date
Cambridge		Magpies	Cambridge Memorial Oval, Cambridge	AYC	1885	1976-1981	0	-	Moved to Tasman FA in 1982
Metropolitan		Kangaroos	Clare Street Oval, New Town	AYC	1956	1976-?	0	-	Folded at unknown date
Risdon Vale		Tigers	Risdon Vale Park, Risdon Vale	AYC	1969	1976-1981	0	-	Moved to Tasman FA in 1982

Premiership Winners

- 1976 – Lachlan 17.12 (114) d Metropolitan 13.8 (86)
- 1977 – Railway 15.15 (105) d West Hobart 11.14 (80)
- 1978 – Buckingham 12.5 (77) d Railway 8.5 (53)
- 1979 – Lachlan 14.17 (101) d Railway 12.2 (74)
- 1980 – Lachlan 8.13 (61) d Bothwell 5.9 (39)
- 1981 – Lachlan 16.12 (108) d West Hobart 14.13 (97)
- 1982 – West Hobart 21.13 (139) d Bothwell 11.3 (69)
- 1983 – Bothwell 10.12 (72) d Lachlan 10.8 (68)
- 1984 – Lachlan 15.16 (106) d Bothwell 7.3 (45)
- 1985 – Bothwell 10.10 (70) d Lachlan 6.12 (48)
- 1986 – Lachlan 14.11 (95) d Maydena 11.9 (75)

Note: The final match of the Southern Tasmanian FA took place on 5 September 1986 when Lachlan defeated Maydena in the Grand Final at the Hamilton Showground.

=== Tamar Football Association (1970−1984) ===
The Tamar Football Association (TFA) was formed via a merger of the East Tamar and West Tamar Football Associations in 1970, after it became possible to drive across the Tamar River with the opening of the Batman Bridge in 1968. The TFA clubs were absorbed into the TAFL Northern Division in 1985 with the exception of Lilydale, which joined the North Eastern Football Union instead.

==== Final clubs ====
Club	Colours	Nickname	Home Ground	Former League	Est.	Years in TFA	TFA Senior Premierships		Fate
Club	Colours	Nickname	Home Ground	Former League	Est.	Years in TFA	Total	Years	Fate
Beaconsfield		Swans	Beaconsfield Football Ground, Beaconsfield	WTFA	1900	1970-1984	3	1974, 1976, 1981	Joined TAFL Northern Division in 1985
Beauty Point		Tigers	Beauty Point Recreation Ground, Beauty Point	WTFA	1948	1970-1984	1	1978	Joined TAFL Northern Division in 1985
Bridgenorth		Parrots	Bridgenorth Recreation Ground, Bridgenorth	WTFA	1923	1970-1984	2	1983, 1984	Joined TAFL Northern Division in 1985
Exeter		Magpies	Exeter Showgrounds, Exeter	WTFA	1910	1970-1984	3	1970, 1975, 1980	Joined TAFL Northern Division in 1985
Hillwood		Sharks	Hillwood Recreation Reserve, Hillwood	ETFA	1921	1980-1984	0	-	Joined TAFL Northern Division in 1985
Lilydale		Robins	Lilydale Recreation Ground, Lilydale	ETFA	1921	1970-1984	0	-	Joined NEFU in 1985

==== Former clubs ====
Club	Colours	Nickname	Home Ground	Former League	Est.	Years in TFA	TFA Senior Premierships		Fate
Club	Colours	Nickname	Home Ground	Former League	Est.	Years in TFA	Total	Years	Fate
George Town		Saints	George Town Sports Complex, George Town	ETFA	1927	1970-1983	6	1971, 1972, 1973, 1977, 1979, 1982	Joined NTFA in 1984
Karoola			Karoola Recreation Ground, Karoola	ETFA	1929	1970-1981	0	-	Folded after 1981 season
Rosevears			Rosevears Recreation Ground, Rosevears	WTFA	1909	1970-1971	0	-	Folded after 1971 season

Premiership Winners

- 1970 – Exeter 11.9 (75) d Beauty Point 10.9 (69)
- 1971 – George Town 9.14 (68) d Exeter 2.12 (24)
- 1972 – George Town 21.9 (135) d Beauty Point 11.9 (75)
- 1973 – George Town 11.15 (81) d Beauty Point 10.6 (66)
- 1974 – Beaconsfield 14.8 (92) d Exeter 11.14 (80)
- 1975 – Exeter 11.14 (80) d Karoola 9.6 (60)
- 1976 – Beaconsfield 23.15 (153) d George Town 13.12 (90)
- 1977 – George Town 13.11 (89) d Karoola 8.10 (58)
- 1978 – Beauty Point 15.14 (104) d Beaconsfield 12.14 (86)
- 1979 – George Town 12.6 (78) d Lilydale 8.11 (59)
- 1980 – Exeter 11.10 (76) d George Town 10.5 (65)
- 1981 – Beaconsfield 11.18 (84) d George Town 9.19 (73)
- 1982 – George Town 12.5 (77) d Bridgenorth 11.10 (76)
- 1983 – Bridgenorth 18.13 (121) d George Town 13.10 (88)
- 1984 – Bridgenorth 20.14 (134) d Hillwood 14.11 (95)

=== Tasman Football Association (1919−2001) ===
The Tasman Football Association was a competition made up of clubs from the Tasman peninsula and areas and suburbs East of Hobart. In its latter years it also contained a team from the Derwent Valley (North Derwent FC) and the Hobart inner suburb of New Town (Railway FC).

=== Tyenna Football Association (1921–1958) ===
Also known as Russell Football Association (1921-1923) and Forest Hill Cup Football Association (1925-1927)

=== Waratah Football Association (1887-1953) ===
Clubs included Bischoff, City, Magnet, Miners, Parrawe Rovers, Pioneer, Union, Wanderers and Waratah

Premiership Winners

- 1887 – No Premier Determined
- 1888 – Bischoff
- 1889 – Bischoff
- 1890 – Bischoff
- 1891 – Bischoff
- 1892 – Bischoff
- 1893 – Bischoff
- 1894 – Bischoff
- 1895 – Bischoff
- 1896 – Bischoff
- 1897 – NO COMPETITION
- 1898 – Bischoff
- 1899 – Bischoff
- 1900 – Bischoff
- 1901 – Bischoff
- 1902 – Bischoff
- 1903 – Bischoff
- 1904 – Pioneer
- 1905 – Bischoff
- 1906 – Bischoff
- 1907 – Magnet
- 1908 – Bischoff
- 1909 – Rovers
- 1910 – Rovers
- 1911 – Rovers
- 1912 – Bischoff
- 1913 – Rovers
- 1914-1919 – WWI/Influenza Pandemic
- 1920 – Rovers
- 1921 – Waratah
- 1922 – Rovers
- 1923 – UNKNOWN
- 1924 – Rovers
- 1925 – Waratah
- 1926 – Bischoff
- 1927 – Rovers
- 1928 – Waratah
- 1929 – Bischoff
- 1930 – NO COMPETITION
- 1931 – NO COMPETITION
- 1932 – Rovers
- 1933 – Rovers
- 1934 – Waratah
- 1935 – COMPETITION CANCELLED
- 1936 – NO COMPETITION
- 1937 – NO COMPETITION
- 1938 – NO COMPETITION
- 1939 – Wanderers
- 1940 – Wanderers
- 1941-46 – WORLD WAR II
- 1947 – Waratah
- 1948 – Parrawe Rovers
- 1949 – Parrawe Rovers
- 1950 – Waratah
- 1951 – Bischoff
- 1952 – Waratah
- 1953 – Parrawe Rovers

=== Western Tasmanian Football Association (1924−1993) ===
Also known as Queenstown Football Association (1924-1963)

=== Zeehan Football Association (1908−1952) ===
Clubs included: Centrals, City, Commonwealth, East Zeehan, Renison Bell, Silver King, Smelters, Strahan, Wanderers, West Zeehan and Zeehan.*

Premiership Winners

- 1908 –
- 1909 – Zeehan
- 1910 – Commonwealth
- 1911 – Silver King
- 1912 – Silver King
- 1913 – Silver King
- 1914 – Zeehan
- 1919 – Commonwealth
- 1920 –
- 1921 – Centrals
- 1922 –
- 1923 – East Zeehan
- 1924 – East Zeehan
- 1925 – East Zeehan
- 1926 – East Zeehan
- 1927 – East Zeehan
- 1928 – East Zeehan
- 1929 – East Zeehan
- 1930 – East Zeehan
- 1931 – City
- 1932 – City
- 1933 – Wanderers
- 1934 – Wanderers
- 1935 – Wanderers
- 1936 – Wanderers
- 1937 – Wanderers
- 1938 – Renison Bell 9.14 (68) d Smelters 5.7 (37)
- 1939 –
- 1940 – Competition suspended (World War II)
- 1941 – Competition suspended (World War II)
- 1942 – Competition suspended (World War II)
- 1943 – Competition suspended (World War II)
- 1944 – Competition suspended (World War II)
- 1945 –
- 1946 –
- 1947 –
- 1948 –
- 1949 –
- 1950 –
- 1951 – West Zeehan 9.18 (72) d Strahan 7.13 (55)
- 1952 – Strahan

== Sources ==
- Australian rules football in Tasmania – 2001 / edited by John Stoward 0957751567
- The Mercury newspaper – Hobart
- The Examiner newspaper – Launceston
- The Advocate newspaper – Burnie
