= West Tamar Football Association =

Australian rules football league

- Most recent season or competition: 1969
- Sport: Australian rules football
- Founded: 1911
- First season: 1911
- Folded: 1969
- No. of teams: 5 (1969), 12 (historical)
- Country: Australia
- Last champion: Rosevears (1969)
- Most titles: Sidmouth (12)

The West Tamar Football Association was an Australian rules football competition based in the Tamar Valley region of northern Tasmania, featuring clubs based on the west side of the Tamar River.

== History ==
The West Tamar Football Association began competition in 1911, with competing clubs being Sidmouth, Glengarry, Sugar Loaf and Exeter. The pre-war years of the competition are not well recorded, with only one premiership, won by Exeter in 1912, known. By 1915 the competition consisted of Exeter, Sidmouth and Rosevears. It was forced into recess a year later due to WWII, but returned in 1919 with the same clubs. Beaconsfield, which had its own association prior to the War, entered a team in 1920 for the first time. Bridgenorth joined the Association for the first time in 1925. The 1925 grand final ended in confusion when it could not be determined what the correct final score was. Both goal umpires, as well as several spectators, had determined different final scores for the game. Despite the scoreboard awarding them the win, Beaconsfield allowed the match to be replayed, which saw Rosevears claim victory and the premiership.

Dwindling player numbers saw Exeter combine with Rosevears to form the Tamar Rovers in 1931. Exeter would return as a standalone club a year later. 1935 saw Bridgenorth drop out and be replaced with a re-formed Rosevears, however the entire competition would enter recess in 1937 owing to most clubs not having sufficient numbers. The competition would be revived in 1938 with Sidmouth, Beaconsfield, Lochiel Rovers (later Exeter) and Rowella participating but would again enter recess in 1941 due to the onset of WWII.

Competition was resumed in 1946 with Rowella replaced by a re-formed Bridgenorth. Rowella and the newly-formed Beauty Point would join in 1947, followed by Frankford in 1949. Frankford would depart after the 1951 season to leave the WTFA with six clubs. Rowella were replaced by Rosevears at some point during the 1950s. Sidmouth folded after the 1962 season, leaving the competition with only 5 clubs. The opening of the Batman Bridge in 1968 made it much easier to travel across the Tamar River, prompting the WTFA to merge with the similarly struggling East Tamar Football Association in 1970 to form the Tamar Football Association.

== Clubs ==
=== Final ===
Club	Colours	Nickname	Home Ground	Former League	Est.	Years in WTFA	WTFA Senior Premierships		Fate
Club	Colours	Nickname	Home Ground	Former League	Est.	Years in WTFA	Total	Years	Fate
Beaconsfield	(1946)(1953)	Swans	Beaconsfield Football Ground, Beaconsfield	–	1900	1920-1936, 1938-1969	9	1922, 1927, 1931, 1933, 1947, 1948, 1953, 1958, 1965	Recess in 1937. Formed Tamar FA in 1970
Beauty Point	(1950s)(?-1969)	Tigers	Beauty Point Recreation Ground, Beauty Point	–	1948	1948-1969	3	1957, 1962, 1964	Formed Tamar FAin 1970
Bridgenorth	(1948)(?-1969)	Parrots	Bridgenorth Recreation Ground, Bridgenorth	–	1923	1925-1934, 1946-1969	10	1929, 1949, 1950, 1951, 1952, 1956, 1959, 1960, 1963, 1967	In recess between 1935-45. Formed Tamar FA in 1970
Exeter (Lochiel Rovers 1938-39)	(?-1939)(1940-69)	Magpies	Exeter Showgrounds, Exeter	–	1910	1911-1913, 1915, 1919-1930, 1932-1936, 1938-1969	3	1912, 1954, 1955	Merged with Rosevears to form Tamar Rovers in 1931. Recess in 1937. Formed Tamar FA in 1970
Rosevears			Rosevears Recreation Ground, Rosevears	–	1909	1915, 1919-1930, 1935-1936, ?-1969	6	1923, 1926, 1930, 1966, 1968, 1969	Merged with Exeter to form Tamar Rovers in 1931. Entered recess after 1936 season. Formed Tamar FA in 1970

=== Former ===
Club	Colours	Nickname	Home Ground	Former League	Est.	Years in WTFA	WTFA Senior Premierships		Fate
Club	Colours	Nickname	Home Ground	Former League	Est.	Years in WTFA	Total	Years	Fate
Frankford			Frankford Recreation Ground, Frankford	–	1949	1949-1951	0	-	Folded after 1951 season
Glengarry				–		1911	0	-	Left league after 1911 season, folded in 1913
Rowella				–	1938	1938-1940, 1947-?	0	-	Folded at unknown date after 1954
Sidmouth	(1936)(?-1962)	Robins	Sidmouth Recreation Ground, Sidmouth	–	1907	1911-1912, 1915, 1919-1936, 1938-1962	12	1921, 1926, 1928, 1932, 1934, 1935, 1936, 1938, 1939, 1940, 1945, 1946, 1961	Recess in 1937. Folded after 1962 season
Sugar Loaf				–		1911-1912	0	-	Folded after 1912 season
Tamar Rovers			Exeter Showgrounds, Exeter and Rosevears Recreation Ground, Rosevears	–	1930	1930	0	-	Replaced by a re-formed Exeter in 1931
Tamar Valley				–		1913	0	-	Folded after 1913 season

== Premierships ==
Year	Premier	Score	Runners-up	Notes
1911	?			
1912	Exeter			
1913	?			
1914	?			
1915	?			
1916-18	Recess - WWI			
1919	?			
1920	?			
1921	Sidmouth	5.9 (39) - 1.11 (17)	Rosevears	
1922	Beaconsfield			
1923	Rosevears	9.11 (65) - 4.6 (30)	Sidmouth	
1924	?			
1925	Beaconsfield		Rosevears	
1925	Rosevears	9.11 (64) - 8.14 (62)	Beaconsfield	Replay - Rosevears contested original result
1926	Sidmouth	6.7 (43) - 6.6 (42)	Rosevears	
1927	Beaconsfield		Bridgenorth	
1928	Sidmouth	10.8 (68) - 6.13 (49)	Bridgenorth	
1929	Bridgenorth	9.7 (61) - 5.11 (41)	Rosevears	
1930	Rosevears	11.9 (75) - 10.9 (69)	Beaconsfield	
1931	Beaconsfield	8.15 (63) - 7.10 (52)	Sidmouth	
1932	Sidmouth	13.13 (91) - 13.9 (87)	Bridgenorth	
1933	Beaconsfield	13.13 (91) - 13.11 (89)	Sidmouth	
1934	Sidmouth	19.14 (128) - 13.18 (96)	Bridgenorth	
1935	Sidmouth	12.13 (85) - 2.1 (13)	Beaconsfield	
1936	Sidmouth			
1937	Recess			
1938	Sidmouth	9.16 (70) - 9.15 (69)	Lochiel Rovers	
1939	Sidmouth	20.17 (137) - 9.6 (60)	Rowella	
1940	Sidmouth	14.14 (97) - 8.19 (67)	Beaconsfield	
1941-44	Recess - WWII			
1945	Sidmouth			
1946	Sidmouth	15.16 (106) - 12.20 (92)	Beaconsfield	
1947	Beaconsfield	17.21 (123) - 13.20 (98)	Bridgenorth	
1948	Beaconsfield	17.16 (108) - 10.12 (72)	Sidmouth	
1949	Bridgenorth	15.6 (96) - 11.13 (79)	Beaconsfield	
1950	Bridgenorth	9.22 (76) - 3.11 (29)	Beaconsfield	
1951	Bridgenorth	9.19 (73) - 5.7 (37)	Sidmouth	
1952	Bridgenorth	12.7 (70) - 9.16 (70)	Beaconsfield	
1953	Beaconsfield	14.14 (98) - 6.7 (43)	Bridgenorth	
1954	Exeter	7.12 (54) - 3.13 (31)	Bridgenorth	
1955	Exeter	14.18 (102) - 2.2 (14)	Beaconsfield	
1956	Bridgenorth	13.13 (91) - 10.9 (69)	Beauty Point	
1957	Beauty Point	12.19 (91) - 13.9 (87)	Beaconsfield	
1958	Beaconsfield	19. 14 (128) - 11.14 (80)	Bridgenorth	
1959	Bridgenorth	15.12 (102) - 11.10 (76)	Beaconsfield	
1960	Bridgenorth	9.15 (69) - 7.9 (51)	Sidmouth	
1961	Sidmouth	8.11 (59) - 6.10 (46)	Beaconsfield	
1962	Beauty Point	12.6 (78)	?	
1963	Bridgenorth	16.16 (112) - 11.14 (80)	Beaconsfield	
1964	Beauty Point	21.16 (142) - 8.14 (62)	Beaconsfield	
1965	Beaconsfield	14.11 (95) - 12.11 (81)	Bridgenorth	
1966	Rosevears	9.12 (66) - 8.15 (63)	Beaconsfield	
1967	Bridgenorth	10.3 (63) - 6.19 (55)	Beaconsfield	
1968	Rosevears	4.13 (37) - 4.8 (32)	Exeter	
1969	Rosevears	16.21 (117) - 5.13 (43)	Exeter	
