= Hobartian =

Hobartian may refer to:

- A demonym referring to a native or inhabitant of Hobart
- An "Old Hobartian" is a graduate of Hobart College, Tasmania
  - The Old Hobartians are a team in the Old Scholars Football Association
- The high church theology promulgated by John Henry Hobart (1775–1830)
