= Huon Football Association =

Australian rules football league

- Most recent season or competition: 1997
- Sport: Australian rules football
- Founded: 1895
- First season: 1895
- Folded: 1997
- No. of teams: 4 (1995), 10 (historical)
- Country: Australia
- Last champion: Franklin (1997)
- Most titles: Cygnet (31)
- Related competitions: Southern FL; Kingborough FA

The Huon Football Association was an Australian rules football competition based in the Huon Valley region of southern Tasmania. The competition ran, with some brief interruptions, from 1895 until the end of the 1997 season.

== History ==
The earliest iteration of the Huon Football Association was formed in 1895, with Franklin, Kermandie and Huonville participating. Franklin won the inaugural premiership. The Association appears to have lapsed after the 1895 season and did not re-form for the next 6 years.

1903 saw the Huon FA resurrected by the same three clubs. The early seasons of the competition saw the premier determined to be the club with the most wins from official roster matches, with no official grand final played. It was common for Huon FA clubs to play matches against other clubs from outside the association, and there were frequent visits from Hobart and Melbourne-based clubs to play a combined Huon side. The Association lapsed again in 1908, with clubs choosing to play in the Dalton Cup competition or in their own town-based competitions instead.

It was decided to re-form the Huon FA again in 1912. Lovett (later known as Cygnet) and Glen Huon joined for the first time. Kermandie were excluded from the 1912 season under strange circumstances, as it was determined that they had submitted their application to join at too late of a date. The club was forced to form their own local association instead. They would re-join the HFA in 1913. Nicholls Rivulet joined in 1914 to form a six-team competition, however the Association decided not to complete the season out of patriotism in support of the war effort.

Competition restarted in 1919 with 3 clubs - Franklin, Cygnet and Kermandie. Kermandie defeated Franklin by 7 points in the 1921 grand final, however the win was later granted to Franklin on appeal after it was determined that two Kermandie behinds were incorrectly scored as goals. Huonville re-joined in 1922, however left the competition again a year later. The club applied for admission again in 1924 however were controversially denied as it was felt that their application was too informal. The Cygnet club also felt that Huonville had shown contempt to the association by only applying to join when they were able to field a team strong enough to win the premiership. Despite these concerns, Huonville were granted readmission a year later in 1925.

The 1934 grand final was decided in controversial circumstances. Huonville defeated Kermandie in the grand final, but Kermandie lodged a protest on the grounds that Huonville listed an ineligible player as 19th man. This was upheld and Kermandie were awarded the premiership.

The 1940 season saw significant upheaval in the roster of clubs due to WWII enlistments. Huonville and Franklin combined to form Huon, while a combined team from the Kingborough Football Association was also admitted. The HFA season was abandoned in July.

Competition began again in 1945 with Cygnet, Huon and Kermandie competing. Huon would split into Huonville and Franklin again a year later. The 1958 grand final between Franklin and Kermandie saw an unprecedented 3 matches required to determine a premier, after both the original grand final and the replay a week later were drawn. Franklin defeated Kermandie in the second replay to secure the premiership.

The long-time four club roster of the HFA was expanded to 6 in 1967 with the addition of Kingston and the newly-formed Channel club, who both joined from the recently-defunct Kingborough FA. Channel was a merger of Snug, Woodbridge, Kettering and Margate, formed after the 1967 Tasmanian bushfires crippled the small communities south of Kingston. This six-club roster lasted until the end of the 1994 season, when Franklin went into recess. Channel and Kingston departed for the newly-formed Southern Football League after the 1995 season, leaving the competition with only 3 clubs until Franklin re-formed. The long-term future of the competition was agreed not to be secure, which saw the remaining four clubs wind up the HFA after more than 100 years after the 1997 season. Huonville and Franklin merged and joined the Southern FL along with Cygnet and Kermandie.

== Clubs ==
=== Final ===
Club	Colours	Nickname	Home Ground	Former League	Est.	Years in HFA	HFA Senior Premierships		Fate
Club	Colours	Nickname	Home Ground	Former League	Est.	Years in HFA	Total	Years	Fate
Cygnet (Lovett 1912-14)	(1930s)(1960s)(?-1997)	Magpies	Cygnet Recreation Ground, Cygnet	–	1912	1912-1914, 1919-1995	31	1912, 1913, 1915, 1922, 1923, 1925, 1926, 1928, 1931, 1935, 1938, 1945, 1947, 1948, 1950, 1951, 1955, 1957, 1960, 1962, 1964, 1966, 1967, 1968, 1970, 1972, 1974, 1976, 1979, 1984, 1994	Joined Southern FL in 1998
Franklin	(1950s-60s)(1960s-74)(1975-97)	Lions	Franklin Oval, Franklin	FFA	1887	1895, 1903-1907, 1912-1914, 1919-1939, 1946-1994, 1996-1997	18	1895, 1903, 1906, 1907, 1914, 1917, 1918, 1921, 1932, 1958, 1959, 1960, 1961, 1963, 1982, 1985, 1987, 1997	Played merged with Huonville as Huon in 1939-45. Recess in 1995. Merged with Huonville to form Huonville Lions in Southern FL in 1998
Huonville	(?-1934)(1935-60s)(60s-1997)	Bulldogs	Huonville Recreation Ground, Huonville	–	1888	1895, 1903-1907, 1912-1914, 1922, 1935-1939, 1946-1997	7	1904, 1933, 1953, 1971, 1973, 1989, 1992	Played merged with Franklin as Huon in 1939-45. Merged with Franklin to form Huonville Lions in Southern FL in 1998
Kermandie (Liverpool 1895)	(1895-?)(?-1997)	Robins	Kermandie Football Oval, Geeveston	KFA	1887	1895, 1903-1907, 1913-1914, 1919-1997	22	1905, 1916, 1919, 1920, 1924, 1927, 1929, 1930, 1934, 1936, 1937, 1939, 1946, 1949, 1952, 1954, 1956, 1961, 1965, 1969, 1993, 1996	Joined Southern FL in 1998

=== Former ===
Club	Colours	Nickname	Home Ground	Former League	Est.	Years in HFA	HFA Senior Premierships		Fate
Club	Colours	Nickname	Home Ground	Former League	Est.	Years in HFA	Total	Years	Fate
Channel		Saints	Snug Football Oval, Snug	–	1967	1967-1995	8	1975, 1977, 1978, 1981, 1983, 1986, 1988, 1990	Formed Southern FL in 1996
Glen Huon		Rosellas	Glen Huon Football Oval, Glen Huon	–	1912	1912-1914	0	-	Moved to Huon Junior FA in 1915
Huon			Franklin Oval, Franklin and Huonville Recreation Ground, Huonville	–	1940	1940, 1945	0	-	De-merged into Huonville and Franklin in 1946
Kingborough			Sandfly Football Ground, Sandfly	–	1940	1940	0	-	Did not re-form after WWII
Kingston		Tigers	Kingston Beach Sports Ground, Kingston Beach	KFA	1903	1967-1995	3	1980, 1991, 1995	Formed Southern FL in 1996
Nicholls Rivulet			Robert Harvey's Paddock, Lovett	–	1914	1914	0	-	Folded after 1914 season

== Premierships ==
Year	Premier	Score	Runners-up	Notes
1895	Franklin		Liverpool	No grand final
1896	HFA in recess			
1897	HFA in recess			
1898	HFA in recess			
1899	HFA in recess			
1900	HFA in recess			
1901	HFA in recess			
1902	HFA in recess			
1903	Franklin			No grand final
1904	Huonville			No grand final
1905	Kermandie			No grand final
1906	Franklin			No grand final
1907	Franklin			No grand final
1908	HFA in recess			
1909	HFA in recess			
1910	HFA in recess			
1911	HFA in recess			
1912	Lovett	6.14 (50) - 1.2 (8)	Huonville	
1913	Lovett	7.7 (49) - 4.7 (31)	Franklin	
1914				Season abandoned
1915-18	HFA in recess (WWI)			
1919	Kermandie		Franklin	
1920	Kermandie	9.12 (66) - 6.7 (43)	Cygnet	
1921	Franklin	8.12 (60) - 7.22 (53)	Kermandie	Won by Franklin on protest
1922	Cygnet	7.9 (51) - 7.8 (50)	Huonville	
1923	Cygnet	6.16 (52) - 6.9 (45)	Franklin	
1924	Kermandie	18.22 (130) - 5.2 (32)	Cygnet	
1925	Cygnet	14.14 (98) - 6.6 (42)	Franklin	
1926	Cygnet	15.15 (105) - 8.13 (61)	Huonville	
1927	Kermandie	8.18 (66) - 6.9 (45)	Huonville	
1928	Cygnet	8.10 (58) - 7.12 (54)	Kermandie	
1929	Kermandie	11.20 (86) - 6.9 (45)	Cygnet	
1930	Kermandie	7.12 (54) - 7.5 (47)	Cygnet	
1931	Cygnet	11.12 (78) - 5.11 (41)	Franklin	
1932	Franklin	9.10 (64) - 7.15 (57)	Huonville	
1933	Huonville	13.5 (83) - 10.10 (70)	Franklin	
1934	Kermandie	5.8 (38) - 7.14 (56)	Huonville	Kermandie awarded premiership after Huonville played unregistered player
1935	Cygnet	8.15 (63) - 5.16 (46)	Huonville	
1936	Kermandie	11.10 (76) - 9.9 (63)	Franklin	
1937	Kermandie	9.10 (64) - 6.12 (48)	Franklin	
1938	Cygnet	10.12 (72) - 9.14 (68)	Kermandie	
1939	Kermandie	8.9 (57) - 5.15 (45)	Cygnet	
1940				Season abandoned
1941-44	HFA in recess (WWII)			
1945	Cygnet	12.15 (87) - 8.11 (59)	Huonville	
1946	Kermandie	13.12 (90) - 8.9 (57)	Cygnet	
1947	Cygnet	15.22 (112) - 4.8 (32)	Huonville	
1948	Cygnet	11.15 (81) - 9.8 (62)	Kermandie	
1949	Kermandie	12.8 (80) - 10.18 (78)	Cygnet	
1950	Cygnet	16.14 (110) - 11.9 (75)	Huonville	
1951	Cygnet	13.20 (98) - 8.11 (59)	Huonville	
1952	Kermandie	13.7 (85) - 9.9 (63)	Cygnet	
1953	Huonville	9.9 (63) - 8.13 (61)	Kermandie	
1954	Kermandie	16.22 (118) - 12.6 (78)	Cygnet	
1955	Cygnet	17.14 (116) - 10.16 (76)	Huonville	
1956	Kermandie	10.13 (73) - 8.16 (64)	Cygnet	
1957	Cygnet	4.10 (34) - 3.11 (29)	Franklin	
1958	Franklin	9.17 (71) - 9.17 (71)	Kermandie	Draw
1958	Franklin	9.14 (68) - 10.8 (68)	Kermandie	First replay (drawn)
1958	Franklin	15.10 (100) - 11.8 (74)	Kermandie	Second replay
1959	Franklin	9.17 (71) - 5.11 (41)	Cygnet	
1960	Cygnet	11.4 (70) - 6.7 (43)	Franklin	
1961	Kermandie	18.22 (130) - 9.6 (60)	Huonville	
1962	Cygnet	12.15 (87) - 6.2 (38)	Kermandie	
1963	Franklin	11.11 (77) - 9.14 (68)	Huonville	
1964	Cygnet	8.14 (62) - 6.10 (46)	Franklin	
1965	Kermandie	12.9 (81) - 9.5 (59)	Huonville	
1966	Cygnet	11.12 (78) - 6.6 (42)	Franklin	
1967	Cygnet	11.11 (77) - 7.10 (52)	Huonville	
1968	Cygnet	10.12 (72) - 7.4 (46)	Channel	
1969	Kermandie	13.16 (94) - 13.14 (92)	Cygnet	
1970	Cygnet	11.4 (70) - 7.10 (52)	Kermandie	
1971	Huonville	16.16 (112) - 10.10 (70)	Kingston	
1972	Cygnet	14.19 (103) - 9.21 (75)	Kingston	
1973	Huonville	11.18 (84) - 10.15 (75)	Channel	
1974	Cygnet	12.14 (86) - 9.10 (64)	Channel	
1975	Channel	9.20 (74) - 9.10 (64)	Cygnet	
1976	Cygnet	14.6 (90) - 12.13 (85)	Channel	
1977	Channel	10.9 (69) - 9.11 (65)	Kermandie	
1978	Channel	20.14 (134) - 12.12 (84)	Kingston	
1979	Cygnet	17.16 (118) - 13.10 (88)	Huonville	
1980	Kingston	20.17 (137) - 17.9 (111)	Cygnet	
1981	Channel	20.16 (136) - 18.11 (119)	Huonville	
1982	Franklin	23.17 (155) - 13.17 (95)	Channel	
1983	Channel	23.23 (161) - 12.6 (78)	Cygnet	
1984	Cygnet	23.10 (148) - 11.12 (78)	Franklin	
1985	Franklin	20.19 (139) - 17.16 (118)	Kingston	
1986	Channel	17.8 (110) - 13.14 (92)	13.14 (92)	
1987	Franklin	11.19 (85) - 11.9 (75)	Channel	
1988	Channel	22.16 (148) - 11.15 (81)	Kermandie	
1989	Huonville	17.12 (114) - 15.14 (104)	Channel	
1990	Channel	22.18 (150) - 20.7 (127)	Huonville	
1991	Kingston	28.16 (184) - 21.10 (136)	Channel	
1992	Huonville	8.7 (55) - 4.7 (31)	Kingston	
1993	Kermandie	16.10 (106) - 12.6 (78)	Kingston	
1994	Cygnet	14.11 (95) - 7.9 (51)	Kingston	
1995	Kingston	11.18 (84) - 8.15 (63)	Kermandie	
1996	Kermandie	13.14 (92) - 12.13 (85)	Franklin	
1997	Franklin	15.14 (104) - 12.8 (80)	Cygnet	
