= East Tamar Football Association =

Australian rules football league

- Most recent season or competition: 1969
- Sport: Australian rules football
- Founded: 1946
- First season: 1946
- Folded: 1969
- No. of teams: 5 (1969), 8 (historical)
- Country: Australia
- Last champion: Lilydale (1969)
- Most titles: Hillwood (8)

The East Tamar Football Association was an Australian rules football competition based in the Tamar Valley region of northern Tasmania, featuring clubs based on the east side of the Tamar River.

== History ==
The East Tamar Football Association began competition in 1946, featuring George Town, Karoola, Lefroy and Lilydale as the inaugural clubs. The formation of the ETFA marked the first region-wide association to be formed. Prior to World War II, small associations, including the George Town Football Association and the Lilydale Football Association had existed only for brief periods, with clubs instead choosing to play challenge matches against a combination from clubs based in Launceston and those in the wider East Tamar region. Hillwood re-formed and joined the ETFA in 1947 to make it a 5-team competition. Lefroy won three premierships in a row between 1947 and 1949 but were forced to fold halfway through the 1951 season after the ceasing of mining operations saw a number of their players leave the area. Karoola also dropped out after 1951 and were replaced by Lebrina.

The newly-formed Rocherlea club joined in 1953. Lebrina dropped out in the late 1950s and were replaced by a re-formed Karoola. Newstead, a club based in Launceston, joined in 1960 but did not see out the decade. Hillwood dominated the second decade of the competition, winning 3 premierships in a row between 1959–61 and again between 1966–1968. Despite this, the club was forced into recess before the 1970 season due to player and committee member shortages. This left the ETFA with only four clubs. The newly-opened Batman Bridge allowed for much easier travel between the two sides of the Tamar River, and it was decided to merge with the West Tamar Football Association. George Town, Lilydale and Karoola joined the newly formed Tamar Football Association, while Rocherlea joined the closer TAFL Northern Division.

== Clubs ==
=== Final ===
| Club | Colours | Nickname | Home Ground | Former League | Est. | Years in ETFA | ETFA Senior Premierships | | Fate |
| Club | Colours | Nickname | Home Ground | Former League | Est. | Years in ETFA | Total | Years | Fate |
|---|---|---|---|---|---|---|---|---|---|
| George Town | (1946–49)(1950–53, 57–64)(1954–56)(1965–69) | Seagulls | George Town Sports Complex, George Town | GTFA | 1927 | 1946–1969 | 4 | 1957, 1958, 1963, 1965 | Formed Tamar FA in 1970 |
| Hillwood | | Sharks, Apple-Snatchers | Hillwood Recreation Reserve, Hillwood | GTFA | 1927 | 1946–1969 | 8 | 1955, 1959, 1960, 1961, 1964, 1966, 1967, 1968 | Entered recess in 1970. Re-formed in Tamar FA in 1980 |
| Karoola | | | Karoola Recreation Ground, Karoola | – | 1929 | 1946–1951, ?-1969 | 2 | 1946, 1962 | Entered recess in 1952. Formed Tamar FA in 1970 |
| Lilydale | | Magpies | Lilydale Recreation Ground, Lilydale | SNLFA | 1921 | 1946–1969 | 6 | 1950, 1951, 1952, 1953, 1956, 1969 | Formed Tamar FA in 1970 |
| Rocherlea | | Tigers, Rockapes | Rocherlea Football Oval, Rocherlea | – | 1951 | 1953–1969 | 1 | 1954 | Moved to TAFL Northern Division in 1970 |

=== Former ===
| Club | Colours | Nickname | Home Ground | Former League | Est. | Years in ETFA | ETFA Senior Premierships | | Fate |
| Club | Colours | Nickname | Home Ground | Former League | Est. | Years in ETFA | Total | Years | Fate |
|---|---|---|---|---|---|---|---|---|---|
| Lebrina | | | Lebrina Recreation Ground, Lebrina | – | 1920 | 1952–? | 0 | – | Folded at unknown date after 1954 |
| Lefroy | | | Lefroy Recreation Ground, Lefroy | GTFA | 1920 | 1946–1951 | 3 | 1947, 1948, 1949 | Folded during 1961 season |
| Newstead | | | Newstead Park, Newstead | – | 1960 | 1960–? | 0 | – | Folded at unknown date before 1969 |

== Premierships ==
| Year | Premier | Score | Runners-up | Notes |
|---|---|---|---|---|
| 1946 | Karoola | 7.12 (54) – 5.15 (45) | Lilydale | |
| 1947 | Lefroy | 9.11 (65) – 4.9 (33) | Lilydale | |
| 1948 | Lefroy | 12.5 (77) – 9.8 (62) | Karoola | |
| 1949 | Lefroy | 10.10 (70) – 8.8 (56) | Lilydale | |
| 1950 | Lilydale | 9.7 (61) – 9.5 (59) | Karoola | |
| 1951 | Lilydale | 8.10 (58) – 4.6 (30) | Hillwood | |
| 1952 | Lilydale | 6.11 (47) – 5.10 (40) | Lebrina | |
| 1953 | Lilydale | 13.13 (91) – 9.2 (56) | Lebrina | |
| 1954 | Rocherlea | 11.13 (79) – 10.11 (71) | Lilydale | |
| 1955 | Hillwood | 12.12 (84) – 10.8 (68) | Lilydale | |
| 1956 | Lilydale | 7.11 (53) – 5.5 (35) | Hillwood | |
| 1957 | George Town | 7.5 (47) – 4.4 (28) | Lilydale | |
| 1958 | George Town | 14.12 (96) – 5.13 (43) | Lilydale | |
| 1959 | Hillwood | 12.11 (83) – 7.11 (53) | Lilydale | |
| 1960 | Hillwood | 13.4 (82) – 9.8 (62) | Lilydale | |
| 1961 | Hillwood | 13.12 (90) – 11.15 (81) | Karoola | |
| 1962 | Karoola | 9.10 (64) – 8.9 (57) | Lilydale | |
| 1963 | George Town | 14.16 (100) – 12.13 (85) | Lilydale | |
| 1964 | Hillwood | 8.13 (61) – 3.8 (26) | Karoola | |
| 1965 | George Town | 16.11 (107) – 6.7 (43) | Lilydale | |
| 1966 | Hillwood | 13.17 (95) – 3.12 (30) | George Town | |
| 1967 | Hillwood | 11.15 (81) – 10.9 (69) | Rocherlea | |
| 1968 | Hillwood | 16.10 (106) – 6.15 (51) | George Town | |
| 1969 | Lilydale | 10.6 (66) – 7.3 (45) | Hillwood | |
