= Queenstown Oval =

Sports oval in Queenstown, Tasmania

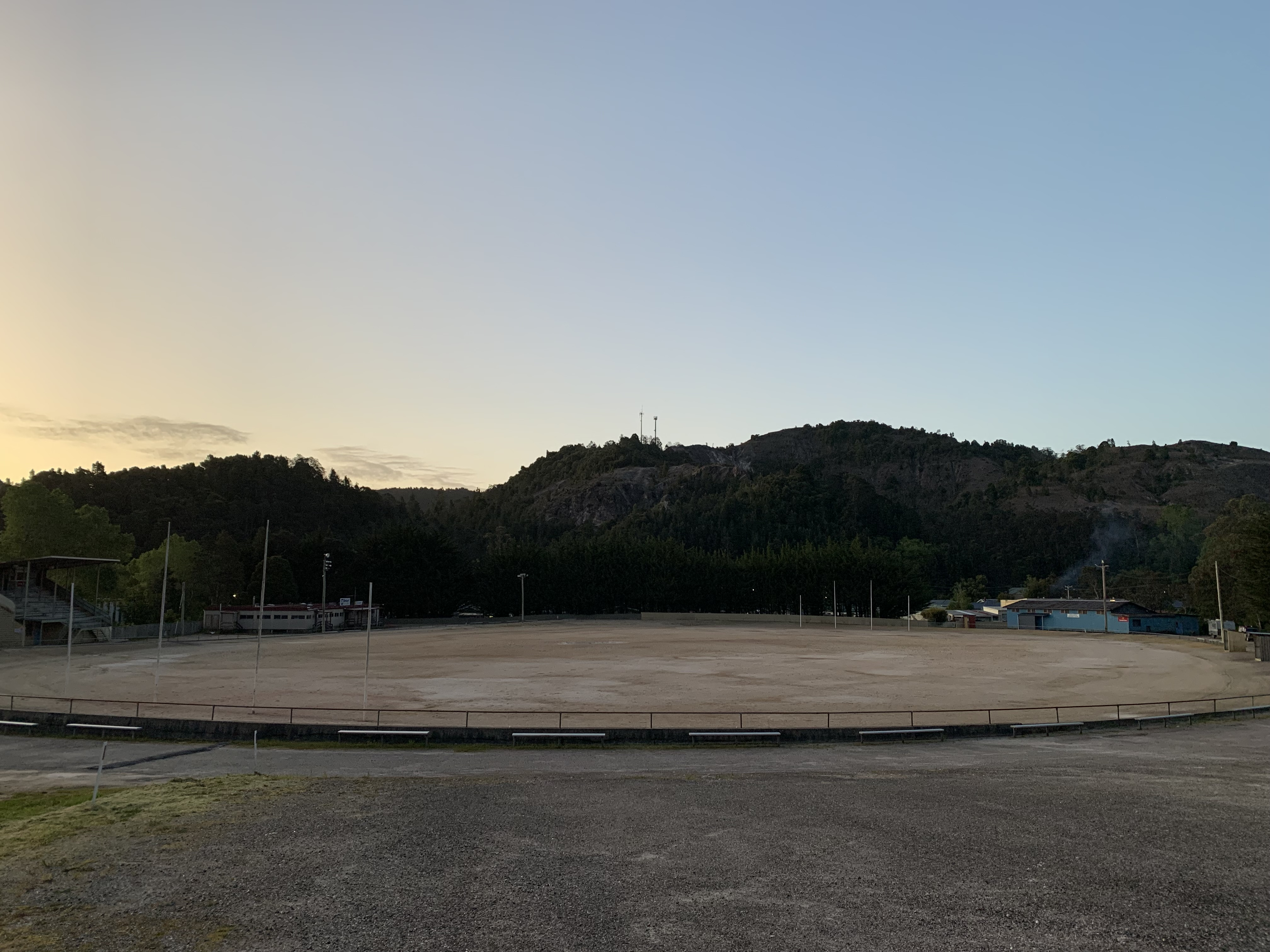
- Queenstown Oval at sunset (2022)
- Interactive map of Queenstown Oval
- Location: Queenstown, Tasmania
- Coordinates: 42°4′33″S 145°33′34″E
- Capacity: 5,000
- Surface: Gravel

Construction
- Opened: 1895
- Cost: Unknown
- Architect: Various

Tenant
- Queenstown Crows Football Club

Queenstown Oval, known colloquially as The Gravel or The Rec (for Recreation Ground), is a sports arena in Queenstown, located on the west coast of Tasmania. Built in 1895, it is infamous for its gravel playing surface, and is used primarily for Australian rules football, while also hosting cricket and athletics. The ground has a main concrete grandstand and a total capacity of 5,000.

For nearly a century, Queenstown Oval was the grand final venue for the now defunct Western Tasmanian Football Association. It is currently the home ground for the local Queenstown Crows in the Darwin Football Association. Queenstown Crows are a 1994-merger of Queenstown Blues and Lyell-Gormanston clubs, both clubs having previously formed as merged entities (Queenstown Blues resulted from the 1977 merger of City Magpies and Smelters Robins, while the Lyell and Gormanston clubs amalgamated in 1976).

The ground was the first in Tasmania to have a siren installed to signal the start and end of each quarter. It was borrowed from the Mt Lyell Mines.

Inducted into the Tasmanian Football Hall of Fame in 2007, the ground was due for updating in the 2010s and was part of The Unconformity festival in 2016.

There is a subtle reference to the ground's gravel playing surface in Jamie Cooper's Tasmania's Team of the Century painting, with gravel visible in the knees of Queenstown-born Australian football legend Ian Stewart.
