= Channel Football Club =

Former Australian rules football club

Channel Saints
- Full name: Channel Football Club
- Nickname: Saints
- Sport: Australian rules football
- Founded: 1967
- Dissolved: 2016
- League: Old Scholars Football Association.(Tas)
- Home ground: Snug Park (capacity: 2,800)
- Anthem: "There's A Team On The Track, Dressed In Red, White & Black"

The Channel Football Club is a former Australian rules football club that last played in the Old Scholars Football Association (Tas) in 2015.
In its history, the club had been a playing member of the Huon Football Association from 1967-1995, the Southern Football League from 1996-2008 and lastly the Old Scholars Football Association from 2009-2015.
The club, which had struggled for much of the previous fifteen years, went into recess owing to a lack of available players prior to the 2016 season and folded.

The Channel Football Club's emblem for most of its history was the Saints.
After quitting the SFL to join the Old Scholars FA in 2009, the club were required to change emblem to the Sharks due to St Virgils already claiming that emblem in that competition.

The Channel Football Club were based at Snug Park, along with the Channel Cricket Club, the ground is situated right alongside the beach at the bottom of Beach Road, Snug.

== The formation of Channel Football Club ==
The Channel Football Club was formed in 1967 after the disastrous 1967 Tasmanian bushfires, which decimated the Channel region. With the demise of the Margate, Kettering, Snug and Woodbridge Football Clubs, the Channel Football Club was formed to incorporate all four of these clubs, Channel would be lining up for the 1967 season in the Huon Football Association. Shortly afterwards, a set of red, white and black playing jumpers were donated to the club by the Longley Football Club, which would no longer be needing them as it had recently merged with Kingston (now Kingborough). Channel adopted the Saints emblem and Red, White & Black playing strip and were firstly based at Margate before moving to the club's present Snug Park headquarters. Channel left the Huon Football Association at the end of 1995 and joined the then STFL (now SFL) in 1996 whereby they won the League's inaugural Senior premiership.

== Channel joins the Old Scholars FA. ==
After losing their final twenty three consecutive matches in the SFL Regional League, including a winless 2008 season, the Channel Football Club applied to join the more social Old Scholars Football Association.
In January 2009, the Channel Football Club was granted permission to join the Old Scholars Football Association.
The club feared that they would be no match for former Premier League clubs rejoining the same competition as them after several had abdicated to join the new Tasmanian State League with the remainder rejoining a single-tier SFL competition, and that the resulting beatings they would've suffered could well have spelled the end of the Channel Football Club's existence.
After a number of years of continuous struggle in the OSFA, including losing their first thirty-nine consecutive matches in the competition (giving Channel the unwanted distinction of holding the Tasmanian record for consecutive defeats at the time with sixty-two), the club battled on until the end of the 2015 season.
Over the Summer break, Channel found itself with a critical shortage of players and in March 2016 it announced that the club would cease to exist effective immediately.
Channel's final match in its existence was on Saturday, 29 August 2015 at Snug Park in the final roster round of that season's Old Scholars Football Association when they hosted eventual premier, Richmond.
Richmond won the match by 45-points, 15.13 (103) to Channel 9.4 (58).

== General Information ==
Club Formed

- 1967

Club Colours

- Red, White and Black.

Emblem

- Saints (1967-2008) & Sharks (2009-2015)

Song

- "There's a team on the track, dressed In red, white and black, we are the mighty Channel team".

Entry to Huon Football Association

- 1967

Entry to Southern Football League

- 1996

Entry to Old Scholars Football Association

- 2009

Huon Football Association Premierships

- 1975, 1977, 1978, 1981, 1983, 1986, 1988, 1990

Huon Football Association Runner-Up

- 1968, 1973, 1976, 1982, 1987, 1989, 1991

Southern Football League Premierships

- 1996

Southern Football League Runners Up

- Nil

Old Scholars Football Association Premierships

- Nil

Old Scholars Football Association Runners Up

- Nil

Peter Hodgman Medal Winners

- Andrew Beveridge (1998)
- M.Gowans (2005)

Club Record Games Holder

- 411 by Ken Smith

Club Record Attendance

- 4,149 v Kingston (Kingborough Tigers) - 1996 SFL Grand Final at Abbotsfield Park.

Club Record Score

- 60.36 (396) vs Lachlan 1.0 (6) at Snug Park in 1996
