= 1953 TANFL season =

Australian rules football season

- Teams: Clarence Kangaroos; New Town Magpies; Hobart Tigers; New Norfolk Eagles; North Hobart Robins; Sandy Bay Seagulls
- Premiers: New Town
- Minor premiers: Hobart; 4th minor premiership

Attendance
- Matches played: 49
- Total attendance: 114,651 (2,340 per match)

The 1953 Tasmanian Australian National Football League (TANFL) premiership season was an Australian Rules football competition staged in Hobart, Tasmania, over fifteen (15) roster rounds and four (4) finals series matches between 18 April and 19 September 1953.

== Participating Clubs ==
- Clarence District Football Club
- New Town District Football Club
- Hobart Football Club
- New Norfolk District Football Club
- North Hobart Football Club
- Sandy Bay Football Club

=== 1953 TANFL Club Coaches ===
- Les McClements (Clarence)
- Jack Rough (Glenorchy)
- Bill Tonks (Hobart)
- Arthur Olliver (New Norfolk)
- Len McCankie (North Hobart)
- Gordon Bowman (Sandy Bay)

=== TANFL Reserves Grand Final ===
- Nth Hobart 8.15 (63) v Sandy Bay 8.4 (52) – North Hobart Oval

=== TANFL Under-19's Grand Final ===
State Schools Old Boys Football Association (SSOBFA)

- Macalburn 6.11 (47) v Buckingham 2.8 (20) – North Hobart Oval

=== Intrastate Matches ===
Jubilee Shield (Saturday, 30 May 1953)

- NWFU 19.13 (127) v TANFL 17.18 (120) – Att: 7,832 at North Hobart Oval

Jubilee Shield (Tuesday, 2 June 1953)

- TANFL 12.19 (91) v NTFA 12.19 (91) – Att: 10,462 at North Hobart Oval

Jubilee Shield (Saturday, 11 July 1953)

- NTFA 16.16 (112) v TANFL 15.16 (106) – Att: 5,732 at York Park

Jubilee Shield (Saturday, 18 July 1953)

- NWFU 13.21 (99) v TANFL 9.28 (82) – Att: N/A at West Park Oval

Inter-Association Match (Saturday, 30 May 1953)

- TANFL II 14.15 (99) v Huon FA 12.9 (81) – Att: 7,832 at North Hobart Oval *

Note: This match was a curtain-raiser to the TANFL v NWFU fixture.

=== Interstate Matches ===
See: 1953 Australian National Football Carnival

Match One (Wednesday, 8 July 1953)

- VFA 11.18 (84) v Tasmania 5.11 (41) – Att: 9,500 at Adelaide Oval

Match Three (Sunday, 12 July 1953)

- Victoria 22.20 (152) v Tasmania 2.8 (20) – Att: 36,500 at Adelaide Oval (Double-Header)

Match Six (Monday, 13 July 1953)

- South Australia 19.13 (127) v Tasmania 17.15 (117) – Att: 8,600 at Adelaide Oval

Match Eight (Thursday, 16 July 1953)

- Western Australia 12.19 (91) v Tasmania 5.7 (37) – Att: N/A at Adelaide Oval

Exhibition Match (Saturday, 18 July 1953)

- Geelong 17.24 (126) v TANFL 8.13 (61) – Att: 4,096 at North Hobart Oval

=== Lightning Premiership Matches ===
(Sunday, 12 July 1953)

- Hobart 3.4 (22) v New Town 1.2 (8)
- New Norfolk 3.6 (24) v Sandy Bay 3.1 (19)
- Clarence 3.3 (21) v Nth Hobart 3.2 (20)
- Hobart 2.3 (15) v Clarence 0.7 (7) (semi-final)
- New Norfolk 4.6 (30) v Hobart 4.1 (25) (Grand Final)
- Attendance: 1,933 at North Hobart Oval

=== Leading Goalkickers: TANFL ===
- Bert Shaw (Sandy Bay) – 51
- Bernie Waldron (Hobart) – 47
- Terry Cashion (Sandy Bay) – 47
- Max Walker (Hobart) – 42
- Rex Garwood (New Town) – 41
- N.Richardson (Clarence) – 41

=== Medal Winners ===
- Terry Cashion (Sandy Bay) – William Leitch Medal
- T.Maddox (New Norfolk) – George Watt Medal (Reserves)
- Athol Unsworth (Macalburn) – V.A Geard Medal (Under-19's)
- John Golding (Hobart) – Weller Arnold Medal (Best TANFL player in Interstate Matches)

== 1953 TANFL Ladder ==
Pos	Team	Pld	W	L	D	PF	PA	PP	Pts
1	Hobart	15	11	3	1	1533	1181	129.8	46
2	New Town	15	10	4	1	1405	1216	115.5	42
3	Sandy Bay	15	10	5	0	1507	1082	139.3	40
4	Clarence	15	5	10	0	1100	1217	90.4	20
5	New Norfolk	15	5	10	0	989	1364	72.5	20
6	North Hobart	15	3	12	0	1102	1576	69.9	12

=== Round 1 ===
(Saturday, 18 April 1953)

- Hobart 12.14 (86) v Clarence 11.11 (77) – Att: 2,916 at North Hobart Oval
- New Town 18.10 (118) v Sandy Bay 16.14 (110) – Att: 2,302 at Queenborough Oval
- New Norfolk 12.11 (83) v Nth Hobart 9.25 (79) – Att: 1,899 at Boyer Oval

=== Round 2 ===
(Saturday, 2 May 1953)

- Hobart 27.13 (175) v Nth Hobart 16.15 (111) – Att: 3,507 at North Hobart Oval
- New Town 14.22 (106) v New Norfolk 8.14 (62) – Att: 2,167 at New Town Oval
- Sandy Bay 15.19 (109) v Clarence 11.14 (80) – Att: 2,129 at Bellerive Oval

=== Round 3 ===
(Saturday, 9 May 1953)

- Sandy Bay 13.18 (96) v New Norfolk 5.8 (38) – Att: 2,058 at North Hobart Oval
- Hobart 16.9 (105) v New Town 16.9 (105) – Att: 3,235 at TCA Ground
- Clarence 9.12 (66) v Nth Hobart 7.14 (56) – Att: 1,285 at Bellerive Oval

=== Round 4 ===
(Saturday, 16 May 1953)

- Sandy Bay 20.11 (131) v Nth Hobart 14.6 (90) – Att: 2,952 at North Hobart Oval
- Hobart 25.18 (168) v New Norfolk 10.12 (72) – Att: 1,171 at TCA Ground
- Clarence 18.13 (121) v New Town 12.25 (97) – Att: 1,980 at New Town Oval

=== Round 5 ===
(Saturday, 23 May 1953)

- New Town 9.15 (69) v Nth Hobart 6.9 (45) – Att: 2,395 at North Hobart Oval
- Hobart 10.9 (69) v Sandy Bay 9.12 (66) – Att: 2,731 at Queenborough Oval
- Clarence 5.20 (50) v New Norfolk 5.15 (45) – Att: 1,292 at Boyer Oval

=== Round 6 ===
(Saturday, 6 June 1953)

- New Norfolk 16.8 (104) v Nth Hobart 13.15 (93) – Att: 1,510 at North Hobart Oval
- Hobart 15.24 (114) v Clarence 7.9 (51) – Att: 1,715 at TCA Ground
- New Town 11.15 (81) v Sandy Bay 9.24 (78) – Att: 2,287 at New Town Oval

=== Round 7 ===
(Saturday, 13 June 1953)

- Sandy Bay 11.8 (74) v Clarence 8.9 (57) – Att: 1,456 at North Hobart Oval
- Hobart 16.18 (114) v Nth Hobart 7.10 (52) – Att: 818 at TCA Ground
- New Town 9.10 (64) v New Norfolk 8.14 (62) – Att: 1,087 at Boyer Oval

=== Round 8 ===
(Saturday, 20 June 1953)

- Nth Hobart 16.14 (110) v Clarence 14.11 (95) – Att: 1,612 at North Hobart Oval
- Sandy Bay 20.14 (134) v New Norfolk 7.12 (54) – Att: 1,565 at Queenborough Oval
- New Town 18.14 (122) v Hobart 12.5 (77) – Att: 2,488 at New Town Oval

=== Round 9 ===
(Saturday, 27 June 1953)

- New Town 14.16 (100) v Clarence 11.11 (77) – Att: 2,248 at North Hobart Oval
- Sandy Bay 17.17 (119) v Nth Hobart 6.13 (49) – Att: 2,028 at Queenborough Oval
- Hobart 16.16 (112) v New Norfolk 7.4 (46) – Att: 957 at Boyer Oval

=== Round 10 ===
(Saturday, 4 July 1953)

- Sandy Bay 16.10 (106) v Hobart 15.9 (99) – Att: 3,967 at North Hobart Oval
- New Town 16.19 (115) v Nth Hobart 7.16 (58) – Att: 1,461 at New Town Oval
- New Norfolk 11.13 (79) v Clarence 10.13 (73) – Att: 892 at Bellerive Oval

=== Round 11 ===
(Saturday, 25 July 1953)

- Sandy Bay 19.13 (127) v New Town 11.13 (79) – Att: 3,264 at North Hobart Oval
- Nth Hobart 13.15 (93) v New Norfolk 12.15 (87) – Att: 766 at TCA Ground
- Hobart 11.17 (83) v Clarence 10.10 (70) – Att: 847 at Bellerive Oval

=== Round 12 ===
(Saturday, 1 August 1953)

- Nth Hobart 12.7 (79) v Hobart 10.17 (77) – Att: 1,894 at North Hobart Oval
- Sandy Bay 15.8 (98) v Clarence 9.17 (71) – Att: 1,745 at Queenborough Oval
- New Town 18.9 (117) v New Norfolk 10.9 (69) – Att: 1,210 at New Town Oval

=== Round 13 ===
(Saturday, 8 August 1953)

- Hobart 13.9 (87) v New Town 11.11 (77) – Att: 3,152 at North Hobart Oval
- Clarence 14.16 (100) v Nth Hobart 6.8 (44) – Att: 1,056 at Bellerive Oval
- New Norfolk 6.11 (47) v Sandy Bay 7.3 (45) – Att: 1,205 at Boyer Oval

=== Round 14 ===
(Saturday, 15 August 1953)

- Sandy Bay 21.14 (140) v Nth Hobart 9.11 (65) – Att: 2,017 at North Hobart Oval
- Hobart 12.10 (82) v New Norfolk 10.13 (73) – Att: 1,352 at TCA Ground
- Clarence 9.9 (63) v New Town 7.12 (54) – Att: 1,537 at Bellerive Oval

=== Round 15 ===
(Saturday, 22 August 1953)

- New Town 14.17 (101) v Nth Hobart 12.5 (77) – Att: 1,283 at North Hobart Oval
- Hobart 12.13 (85) v Sandy Bay 11.8 (74) – Att: 2,485 at TCA Ground
- New Norfolk 9.14 (68) v Clarence 7.7 (49) – Att: 1,339 at Boyer Oval

=== First Semi Final ===
(Saturday, 29 August 1953)

- Sandy Bay: 3.5 (23) | 6.6 (42) | 11.8 (74) | 14.12 (96)
- Clarence: 1.2 (8) | 5.7 (37) | 8.9 (57) | 9.12 (66)
- Attendance: 6,034 at North Hobart Oval

=== Second Semi Final ===
(Saturday, 5 September 1953)

- New Town: 4.4 (28) | 6.4 (40) | 9.7 (61) | 11.10 (76)
- Hobart: 0.3 (3) | 1.4 (10) | 2.8 (20) | 4.9 (33)
- Attendance: 4,017 at North Hobart Oval

=== Preliminary Final ===
(Saturday, 12 September 1953)

- Sandy Bay: 3.1 (19) | 6.2 (38) | 10.4 (64) | 13.5 (83)
- Hobart: 1.2 (8) | 3.6 (24) | 5.7 (37) | 8.12 (60)
- Attendance: 7,993 at North Hobart Oval

=== Grand Final ===
(Saturday, 19 September 1953)

- New Town: 6.2 (38) | 10.9 (69) | 13.13 (91) | 16.18 (114)
- Sandy Bay: 7.2 (44) | 8.7 (55) | 12.11 (83) | 15.13 (103)
- Attendance: 11,860 at North Hobart Oval
