= 1990 TFL Statewide League season =

- Teams: Burnie Hawks; Clarence Kangaroos; Devonport Blues; Glenorchy Magpies; Hobart Tigers; New Norfolk Eagles; North Hobart Demons; North Launceston Robins; Sandy Bay Seagulls; South Launceston Bulldogs
- Premiers: Hobart
- Minor premiers: Clarence; 6th minor premiership

Attendance
- Matches played: 111
- Total attendance: 203,566 (1,834 per match)

The 1990 TFL Statewide League premiership season was an Australian rules football competition staged across Tasmania over 21 roster rounds and 6 finals series matches between 31 March and 22 September 1990.

The League was known as the Cascade-Boags Statewide League under a dual commercial naming-rights sponsorship agreement worth A$1.08 million over the following three years with both Cascade Brewery in Hobart and Boag's Brewery in Launceston.

== Participating Clubs ==
- Burnie Hawks Football Club
- Clarence District Football Club
- Devonport Blues Football Club
- Glenorchy District Football Club
- Hobart Football Club
- New Norfolk District Football Club
- North Hobart Football Club
- North Launceston Football Club
- Sandy Bay Football Club
- South Launceston Football Club

=== 1990 TFL Statewide League Club Coaches ===
- Mark Scott (Burnie Hawks)
- Peter Daniel (Clarence)
- Peter Knights (Devonport)
- Danny Ling (Glenorchy)
- Mark Browning (Hobart)
- Peter Chisnall (New Norfolk)
- Roland Crosby (North Hobart)
- Steven Goulding (North Launceston)
- Shane Williams & Geoff Whitton (Sandy Bay)
- Ricky Dolliver (South Launceston)

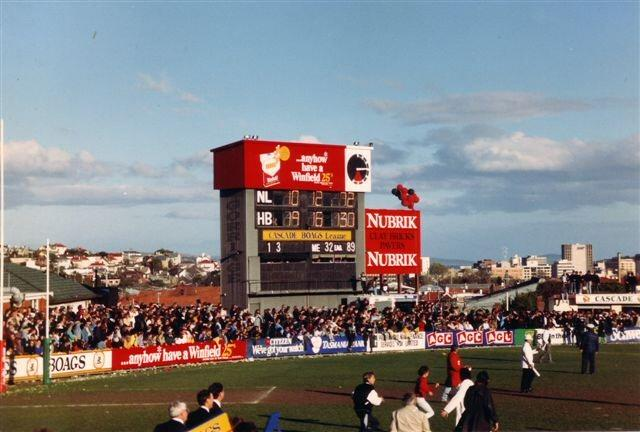
Final scoreboard at North Hobart after the 1990 TFL Statewide Grand Final shows a 58-point victory to Hobart over North Launceston.

=== Medibank Private Cup (Reserves) Grand Final ===
- Burnie Hawks 13.11 (89) v Glenorchy 9.9 (63) – North Hobart Oval

=== Tasmania Bank Colts (Under-19's) Grand Final ===
- Nth Launceston 10.13 (73) v Glenorchy 10.4 (64) – North Hobart Oval

=== TFL Fourths (Under-17's) Grand Final ===
- Clarence 10.11 (71) v Sandy Bay 9.17 (71) – KGV Football Park

=== Leading Goalkickers: TFL Statewide League ===
- Paul Dac (New Norfolk) – 103
- Wayne Fox (Sth Launceston & Sandy Bay) – 88
- Chris Reiwoldt (Clarence) – 77
- Mark Williams (Devonport) – 71

=== Medal Winners ===
- Ricky Hanlon (New Norfolk) – William Leitch Medal
- Michael Winter (Hobart) – Darrel Baldock Medal (Best player in TFL Grand Final)
- Jeffrey Wood (Devonport) – George Watt Medal (Reserves)
- Drew Hall (Sandy Bay) – V.A Geard Medal (Under-19's)
- Stephen Old (Clarence) – D.R Plaister Medal (Under-17's)
- James Manson (Collingwood) – Lefroy Medal (Best player in State Match)

=== Interstate Matches ===
State of Origin Match (Sunday, 24 June 1990) – (Tas-TV footage of Tasmania's 1990 State Of Origin victory)

- Tasmania 20.14 (134) v Victoria 14.17 (101) – Att: 18,651 at North Hobart Oval

=== Intrastate Matches ===
Intrastate Match (Sunday, 24 June 1990)

- TFL 28.17 (185) v NTFL 10.5 (65) – Att: 18,651 at North Hobart Oval (State of Origin Curtain Raiser)

=== 1990 TFL Club Home Attendance Figures ===
- Clarence: 23,692 for 11 matches at 2,153
- Hobart: 17,744 for 10 matches at 1,774
- Devonport: 17,722 for 10 matches at 1,772
- New Norfolk: 18,718 for 11 matches at 1,701
- Nth Hobart: 18,470 for 11 matches at 1,679
- Nth Launceston: 16,513 for 10 matches at 1,651
- Burnie Hawks: 17,276 for 11 matches at 1,570
- Glenorchy: 14,198 for 10 matches at 1,419
- Sandy Bay: 12,260 for 10 matches at 1,226
- Sth Launceston: 8,401 for 11 matches at 763

== 1990 TFL Statewide League Ladder ==
Pos	Team	Pld	W	L	D	PF	PA	PP	Pts
1	Clarence	21	16	5	0	2530	1745	145.0	64
2	North Launceston	21	15	6	0	2201	1636	134.5	60
3	Hobart	21	14	7	0	2261	1839	122.9	56
4	Sandy Bay	21	13	8	0	2006	1840	109.0	52
5	New Norfolk	21	12	8	1	2164	2047	105.7	50
6	Burnie Hawks	21	10	10	1	2241	2091	107.2	42
7	Devonport	21	10	11	0	2136	2011	106.2	40
8	North Hobart	21	7	14	0	1793	2190	81.9	28
9	Glenorchy	21	5	16	0	1732	2171	79.8	20
10	South Launceston	21	2	19	0	1689	3163	53.4	8

=== Round 1 ===
(Saturday, 31 March 1990)

- Nth Hobart 10.15 (75) v Glenorchy 7.19 (61) – Att: 2,235 at North Hobart Oval
- Hobart 13.15 (93) v Sandy Bay 9.13 (67) – Att: 1,652 at Queenborough Oval
- New Norfolk 18.15 (123) v Devonport 14.12 (96) – Att: 1,201 at Boyer Oval
- Sth Launceston 16.7 (103) v Nth Launceston 15.10 (100) – Att: 1,200 at Youngtown Memorial Ground
- Burnie Hawks 15.11 (101) v Clarence 10.11 (71) – Att: 1,507 at West Park Oval

=== Round 2 ===
(Saturday, 7 April 1990)

- Hobart 15.17 (107) v New Norfolk 14.10 (94) – Att: 1,494 at North Hobart Oval
- Clarence 17.14 (116) v Nth Hobart 15.5 (95) – Att: 2,394 at Bellerive Oval
- Sandy Bay 17.12 (114) v Glenorchy 9.13 (67) – Att: 1,620 at KGV Football Park
- Nth Launceston 18.18 (126) v Burnie Hawks 11.11 (77) – Att: 1,681 at York Park
- Devonport 28.16 (184) v Sth Launceston 14.18 (102) – Att: 1,427 at Devonport Oval

=== Round 3 ===
(Saturday, 14 April & Monday, 16 April 1990)

- Nth Launceston 16.11 (107) v Nth Hobart 9.8 (62) – Att: 1,896 at North Hobart Oval
- Sandy Bay 17.14 (116) v New Norfolk 12.16 (88) – Att: 1,427 at Boyer Oval
- Hobart 18.21 (129) v Sth Launceston 15.9 (99) – Att: 856 at Youngtown Memorial Ground
- Clarence 14.8 (92) v Glenorchy 11.9 (75) – Att: 2,500 at Bellerive Oval (Monday)
- Burnie Hawks 24.20 (164) v Devonport 12.8 (80) – Att: 3,007 at West Park Oval (Monday)

=== Round 4 ===
(Saturday, 21 April 1990)

- Hobart 19.14 (128) v Burnie Hawks 14.16 (100) – Att: 1,645 at North Hobart Oval
- Sandy Bay 20.14 (134) v Sth Launceston 10.14 (74) – Att: 823 at Queenborough Oval
- New Norfolk 22.11 (143) v Glenorchy 19.12 (126) – Att: 1,663 at KGV Football Park
- Clarence 14.8 (92) v Nth Launceston 9.19 (73) – Att: 1,707 at York Park
- Devonport 14.8 (92) v Nth Hobart 12.14 (86) – Att: 1,477 at Devonport Oval

=== Round 5 ===
(Saturday, 28 April 1990)

- Hobart 25.19 (169) v Nth Hobart 16.12 (108) – Att: 2,308 at North Hobart Oval
- Clarence 23.14 (152) v Devonport 16.7 (103) – Att: 1,408 at Bellerive Oval
- Nth Launceston 14.18 (102) v Glenorchy 11.12 (78) – Att: 1,100 at KGV Football Park
- New Norfolk 17.15 (117) v Sth Launceston 15.16 (106) – Att: 812 at Youngtown Memorial Ground
- Burnie Hawks 15.18 (108) v Sandy Bay 8.14 (62) – Att: 1,433 at West Park Oval

=== Round 6 ===
(Saturday, 5 May 1990)

- Clarence 23.9 (147) v Hobart 10.9 (69) – Att: 3,344 at North Hobart Oval
- Sandy Bay 26.12 (168) v Nth Hobart 10.6 (66) – Att: 1,356 at Queenborough Oval
- New Norfolk 16.12 (108) v Burnie Hawks 15.18 (108) – Att: 1,584 at Boyer Oval
- Sth Launceston 14.14 (98) v Glenorchy 13.16 (94) – Att: 738 at Youngtown Memorial Ground
- Devonport 14.13 (97) v Nth Launceston 5.13 (43) – Att: 1,765 at Devonport Oval

=== Round 7 ===
(Saturday, 12 May 1990)

- New Norfolk 13.24 (102) v Nth Hobart 13.5 (83) – Att: 1,747 at North Hobart Oval
- Clarence 12.13 (85) v Sandy Bay 8.15 (63) – Att: 2,164 at Bellerive Oval
- Devonport 10.11 (71) v Glenorchy 7.5 (47) – Att: 966 at KGV Football Park
- Nth Launceston 15.13 (103) v Hobart 7.15 (57) – Att: 1,530 at York Park
- Burnie Hawks 23.10 (148) v Sth Launceston 7.17 (59) – Att: 1,147 at West Park Oval

=== Round 8 ===
(Saturday, 19 May 1990)

- Devonport 18.15 (123) v Hobart 9.13 (67) – Att: 1,328 at North Hobart Oval
- Nth Launceston 18.12 (120) v Sandy Bay 8.11 (59) – Att: 1,055 at Queenborough Oval
- New Norfolk 17.18 (120) v Clarence 16.11 (107) – Att: 2,607 at Boyer Oval
- Nth Hobart 21.11 (137) v Sth Launceston 11.17 (83) – Att: 750 at Youngtown Memorial Ground
- Burnie Hawks 17.21 (123) v Glenorchy 10.14 (74) – Att: 1,304 at West Park Oval

=== Round 9 ===
(Saturday, 26 May 1990)

- Nth Hobart 20.7 (127) v Burnie Hawks 14.13 (97) – Att: 1,481 at North Hobart Oval
- Hobart 9.14 (68) v Glenorchy 5.5 (35) – Att: 1,694 at KGV Football Park
- Clarence 32.20 (212) v Sth Launceston 4.3 (27) – Att: 1,396 at Bellerive Oval
- Nth Launceston 22.20 (152) v New Norfolk 11.7 (73) – Att: 2,270 at York Park
- Sandy Bay 13.18 (96) v Devonport 14.10 (94) – Att: 2,164 at Devonport Oval

=== Round 10 ===
(Saturday, 2 June & Sunday, 3 June 1990)

- Hobart 22.18 (150) v Sandy Bay 9.15 (69) – Att: 1,610 at North Hobart Oval
- Nth Hobart 10.11 (71) v Glenorchy 9.15 (69) – Att: 1,628 at KGV Football Park
- Clarence 20.23 (143) v Burnie Hawks 10.12 (72) – Att: 1,719 at Bellerive Oval
- Devonport 15.19 (109) v New Norfolk 14.13 (97) – Att: 1,816 at Devonport Oval
- Nth Launceston 28.20 (188) v Sth Launceston 7.10 (52) – Att: 2,349 at York Park (Sunday)

=== Round 11 ===
(Saturday, 9 June. Sunday, 10 June & Monday, 11 June 1990)

- Glenorchy 13.16 (94) v Sandy Bay 14.8 (92) – Att: 1,291 at Queenborough Oval (Saturday)
- New Norfolk 20.17 (137) v Hobart 13.17 (95) – Att: 2,392 at Boyer Oval (Saturday)
- Nth Launceston 19.11 (125) v Burnie Hawks 17.14 (116) – Att: 1,716 at West Park Oval (Saturday)
- Devonport 29.12 (186) v Sth Launceston 13.14 (92) – Att: 1,037 at Youngtown Memorial Ground (Sunday)
- Clarence 23.16 (154) v Nth Hobart 13.10 (88) – Att: 2,919 at North Hobart Oval (Monday)

=== Round 12 ===
(Saturday, 16 June & Sunday, 17 June 1990)

- Hobart 27.23 (185) v Sth Launceston 12.13 (85) – Att: 990 at North Hobart Oval
- New Norfolk 20.11 (131) v Sandy Bay 12.22 (94) – Att: 1,159 at Queenborough Oval
- Clarence 16.22 (118) v Glenorchy 14.13 (97) – Att: 1,798 at KGV Football Park
- Nth Launceston 11.13 (79) v Nth Hobart 8.6 (54) – Att: 1,154 at York Park
- Burnie Hawks 16.15 (111) v Devonport 13.13 (91) – Att: 4,013 at Devonport Oval (Sunday)

=== Round 13 ===
(Saturday, 30 June & Sunday, 1 July 1990)

- Devonport 18.15 (123) v Nth Hobart 15.15 (105) – Att: 1,230 at North Hobart Oval
- Clarence 22.16 (148) v Nth Launceston 7.14 (56) – Att: 2,409 at Bellerive Oval
- New Norfolk 22.12 (144) v Glenorchy 13.6 (84) – Att: 2,125 at Boyer Oval
- Burnie Hawks 9.10 (64) v Hobart 7.9 (51) – Att: 1,066 at West Park Oval
- Sandy Bay 22.15 (147) v Sth Launceston 13.15 (93) – Att: 783 at York Park (Sunday)

=== Round 14 ===
(Saturday, 7 July 1990)

- Nth Hobart 7.12 (54) v Hobart 6.12 (48) – Att: 1,090 at North Hobart Oval
- Sandy Bay 6.6 (42) v Burnie Hawks 3.7 (25) – Att: 708 at Queenborough Oval
- New Norfolk 12.14 (86) v Sth Launceston 2.5 (17) – Att: 982 at Boyer Oval
- Glenorchy 14.12 (96) v Nth Launceston 9.10 (64) – Att: 1,061 at York Park
- Clarence 14.12 (96) v Devonport 8.9 (57) – Att: 1,677 at Devonport Oval

=== Round 15 ===
(Saturday, 14 July 1990)

- Hobart 13.23 (101) v Clarence 11.12 (78) – Att: 2,136 at Bellerive Oval
- Sandy Bay 16.8 (104) v Nth Hobart 14.12 (96) – Att: 1,508 at North Hobart Oval
- Glenorchy 24.18 (162) v Sth Launceston 18.14 (122) – Att: 1,135 at KGV Football Park
- Nth Launceston 14.13 (97) v Devonport 12.8 (80) – Att: 1,352 at York Park
- New Norfolk 18.19 (127) v Burnie Hawks 16.16 (112) – Att: 1,370 at West Park Oval

=== Round 16 ===
(Saturday, 21 July & Sunday, 22 July 1990)

- Hobart 13.11 (89) v Nth Launceston 11.13 (79) – Att: 1,608 at North Hobart Oval
- Sandy Bay 15.9 (99) v Clarence 12.15 (87) – Att: 1,587 at Queenborough Oval
- New Norfolk 14.15 (99) v Nth Hobart 9.4 (58) – Att: 1,913 at Boyer Oval
- Glenorchy 14.12 (96) v Devonport 11.10 (76) – Att: 1,333 at Devonport Oval
- Burnie Hawks 22.16 (148) v Sth Launceston 13.9 (87) – Att: 545 at York Park (Sunday)

=== Round 17 ===
(Saturday, 28 July 1990)

- Nth Hobart 21.19 (145) v Sth Launceston 14.6 (90) – Att: 858 at North Hobart Oval
- Glenorchy 18.10 (118) v Burnie Hawks 14.17 (101) – Att: 1,233 at KGV Football Park
- Clarence 17.15 (117) v New Norfolk 15.9 (99) – Att: 4,697 at Bellerive Oval
- Nth Launceston 18.8 (116) v Sandy Bay 13.14 (92) – Att: 1,666 at York Park
- Hobart 13.20 (98) v Devonport 9.11 (65) – Att: 1,177 at Devonport Oval

=== Round 18 ===
(Saturday, 4 August 1990)

- Hobart 22.14 (146) v Glenorchy 7.12 (54) – Att: 1,908 at North Hobart Oval
- Sandy Bay 12.10 (82) v Devonport 10.12 (72) – Att: 900 at Queenborough Oval
- Nth Launceston 13.15 (93) v New Norfolk 12.10 (82) – Att: 1,705 at Boyer Oval
- Clarence 20.17 (137) v Sth Launceston 12.7 (79) – Att: 544 at York Park
- Burnie Hawks 21.15 (141) v Nth Hobart 12.13 (85) – Att: 1,743 at West Park Oval

=== Round 19 ===
(Saturday, 11 August & Sunday, 12 August 1990)

- Nth Hobart 13.24 (102) v Glenorchy 11.13 (79) – Att: 1,418 at North Hobart Oval
- Sandy Bay 10.7 (67) v Hobart 9.6 (60) – Att: 1,729 at Queenborough Oval
- New Norfolk 10.11 (71) v Devonport 5.16 (46) – Att: 1,258 at KGV Football Park *
- Burnie Hawks 24.12 (156) v Clarence 19.9 (123) – Att: 1,477 at West Park Oval
- Nth Launceston 20.17 (137) v Sth Launceston 3.6 (24) – Att: 520 at York Park (Sunday)

Note: Match switched to KGV due to flooding at Boyer Oval.

=== Round 20 ===
(Saturday, 18 August 1990)

- Hobart 21.22 (148) v New Norfolk 15.10 (100) – Att: 2,727 at North Hobart Oval
- Sandy Bay 24.21 (165) v Glenorchy 15.8 (98) – Att: 1,361 at KGV Football Park *
- Clarence 19.21 (135) v Nth Hobart 10.10 (70) – Att: 1,522 at Bellerive Oval
- Nth Launceston 26.11 (167) v Burnie Hawks 12.7 (79) – Att: 1,743 at York Park
- Devonport 30.14 (194) v Sth Launceston 13.8 (86) – Att: 873 at Devonport Oval

Note: Wayne Fox (Sandy Bay) registers his 1000th TFL goal, 22 minutes into the first quarter.

=== Round 21 ===
(Saturday, 25 August & Sunday, 26 August 1990)

- Nth Launceston 9.20 (74) v Nth Hobart 3.8 (26) – Att: 870 at North Hobart Oval
- Clarence 18.12 (120) v Glenorchy 7.3 (45) – Att: 1,347 at Bellerive Oval
- Sandy Bay 10.13 (73) v New Norfolk 2.11 (23) – Att: 1,524 at Boyer Oval
- Hobart 31.17 (203) v Sth Launceston 15.21 (111) – Att: 616 at York Park
- Devonport 14.13 (97) v Burnie Hawks 13.12 (90) – Att: 1,506 at West Park Oval (Sunday)

=== Qualifying Final ===
(Saturday, 1 September 1990)

- Nth Launceston: 4.2 (26) | 7.7 (49) | 14.10 (94) | 17.13 (115)
- Hobart: 4.4 (28) | 8.7 (55) | 12.11 (83) | 15.13 (103)
- Attendance: 4,282 at York Park

=== Elimination Final ===
(Sunday, 2 September 1990)

- Sandy Bay: 5.6 (36) | 11.8 (74) | 18.15 (123) | 24.21 (165)
- New Norfolk: 5.0 (30) | 9.2 (56) | 9.3 (57) | 12.4 (76)
- Attendance: 4,765 at North Hobart Oval

=== Second Semi Final ===
(Saturday, 8 September 1990)

- Nth Launceston: 6.5 (41) | 7.8 (50) | 14.12 (96) | 16.18 (114)
- Clarence: 3.4 (22) | 7.8 (50) | 8.11 (59) | 12.12 (84)
- Attendance: 4,206 at North Hobart Oval

=== First Semi Final ===
(Sunday, 9 September 1990)

- Hobart: 7.4 (46) | 14.7 (91) | 19.10 (124) | 20.12 (132)
- Sandy Bay: 7.0 (42) | 9.3 (57) | 12.4 (76) | 15.9 (99)
- Attendance: 4,017 at North Hobart Oval

=== Preliminary Final ===
(Saturday, 15 September 1990)

- Hobart: 4.3 (27) | 9.7 (61) | 10.11 (71) | 15.15 (105)
- Clarence: 3.4 (22) | 5.6 (36) | 12.11 (83) | 13.12 (90)
- Attendance: 5,669 at North Hobart Oval

=== Grand Final ===
(Saturday, 22 September 1990) (ABC-TV highlights: 1990 TFL Grand Final)

- Hobart: 1.4 (10) | 5.8 (38) | 9.10 (64) | 19.16 (130)
- Nth Launceston: 3.3 (21) | 6.6 (42) | 9.10 (64) | 10.12 (72)
- Attendance: 15,633 at North Hobart Oval
