= 1970 TANFL season =

Australian rules football season

- Teams: Clarence Kangaroos; Glenorchy Magpies; Hobart Tigers; New Norfolk Eagles; North Hobart Demons; Sandy Bay Seagulls
- Premiers: Clarence
- Minor premiers: Sandy Bay; 3rd minor premiership

Attendance
- Matches played: 64
- Total attendance: 254,507 (3,977 per match)

The 1970 Tasmanian Australian National Football League (TANFL) premiership season was an Australian rules football competition staged in Hobart, Tasmania over twenty (20) roster rounds and four (4) finals series matches between 28 March and 12 September 1970.

== Participating Clubs ==
- Clarence District Football Club
- Glenorchy District Football Club
- Hobart Football Club
- New Norfolk District Football Club
- North Hobart Football Club
- Sandy Bay Football Club

=== 1970 TANFL Club Coaches ===
- John Bingley (Clarence)
- Graeme Gahan (Glenorchy)
- Burnie Payne (Hobart)
- Ricky Graham (New Norfolk)
- John Devine (North Hobart)
- Rod Olsson (Sandy Bay)

=== TANFL Reserves Grand Final ===
- Glenorchy 15.8 (98) v New Norfolk 9.11 (65) – North Hobart Oval

=== TANFL Under-19's Grand Final ===
(Sunday, 13 September 1970)

- Glenorchy defeated Buckingham (No score available) – North Hobart Oval

=== State Preliminary Final ===
(Saturday, 26 September 1970)

- Clarence: 3.3 (21) | 10.4 (64) | 18.5 (113) | 19.6 (120)
- Scottsdale: 5.4 (34) | 9.4 (58) | 12.5 (77) | 14.8 (92)
- Attendance: 9,721 at North Hobart Oval

=== State Grand Final ===
(Saturday, 3 October 1970)

- Latrobe: 4.2 (26) | 7.3 (45) | 10.7 (67) | 15.10 (100)
- Clarence: 1.3 (9) | 6.7 (43) | 8.9 (57) | 9.11 (65)
- Attendance: 9,778 at Devonport Oval

=== Interstate Matches ===
Interstate Match (Monday, 15 June 1970) – (Article: 1970 Tasmania v WA Interstate Match)^{[usurped]}

- Tasmania 18.10 (118) v Western Australia 17.14 (116) – Att: 19,823 at North Hobart Oval

=== Intrastate Matches ===
Jubilee Shield (Saturday, 2 May 1970)

- TANFL 11.15 (81) v NTFA 7.11 (53) – Att: 3,207 at York Park

Jubilee Shield (Saturday, 30 May 1970)

- TANFL 19.15 (129) v NWFU 15.19 (109) – Att: 13,238 at North Hobart Oval

=== Leading Goalkickers: TANFL ===
- Brent Palfreyman (Sandy Bay) & John Best (Clarence) – 65
- Terry Mayne (Clarence) – 56
- John Marshall (Nth Hobart) – 48
- Michael Elliot (Sandy Bay) – 45

=== Medal Winners ===
- Roger Steele (Sandy Bay) – William Leitch Medal
- Les Barratt (New Norfolk) – George Watt Medal (Reserves)
- K Edwards (New Norfolk) - Les Webb Trophy (Under-19's)
- P. Dwyer (New Norfolk) & M Wiggins (Sandy Bay) – Vic Geard Medal (Under-17's)
- Ricky Graham (New Norfolk) – Weller Arnold Medal (Best player in Intrastate matches)

== 1970 TANFL Ladder ==
Pos	Team	Pld	W	L	D	PF	PA	PP	Pts
1	Sandy Bay	20	15	5	0	2151	1556	138.2	60
2	Clarence	20	13	6	1	2031	1687	120.4	54
3	New Norfolk	20	11	7	2	1734	1491	116.3	48
4	North Hobart	20	11	7	2	1772	1854	95.6	48
5	Glenorchy	20	3	15	2	1589	2079	76.4	16
6	Hobart	20	3	16	1	1384	1976	70.0	14

=== Round 1 ===
(Saturday, 28 March & Monday, 30 March 1970)

- Sandy Bay 19.24 (138) v Nth Hobart 10.10 (70) – Att: 6,375 at North Hobart Oval
- New Norfolk 12.8 (80) v Hobart 7.9 (51) – Att: 2,456 at Boyer Oval
- Clarence 26.11 (167) v Glenorchy 9.12 (66) – Att: 5,440 at KGV Football Park (Monday)

=== Round 2 ===
(Saturday, 4 April 1970)

- Sandy Bay 6.15 (51) v New Norfolk 5.16 (46) – Att: 4,208 at North Hobart Oval
- Nth Hobart 16.9 (105) v Clarence 15.12 (102) – Att: 4,277 at Bellerive Oval
- Hobart 10.27 (87) v Glenorchy 13.8 (86) – Att: 2,394 at TCA Ground

=== Round 3 ===
(Saturday, 11 April 1970)

- Nth Hobart 19.19 (133) v Hobart 10.12 (72) – Att: 4,384 at North Hobart Oval
- Clarence 18.21 (129) v Sandy Bay 17.15 (117) – Att: 4,875 at Queenborough Oval
- Glenorchy 14.16 (100) v New Norfolk 14.16 (100) – Att: 2,804 at KGV Football Park

=== Round 4 ===
(Saturday, 18 April 1970)

- Clarence 17.21 (123) v Hobart 13.5 (83) – Att: 3,953 at North Hobart Oval
- Sandy Bay 30.10 (190) v Glenorchy 9.17 (71) – Att: 3,161 at KGV Football Park
- New Norfolk 20.11 (131) v Nth Hobart 12.12 (84) – Att: 2,805 at Boyer Oval

=== Round 5 ===
(Saturday, 25 April 1970)

- Nth Hobart 22.8 (140) v Glenorchy 13.17 (95) – Att: 4,020 at North Hobart Oval
- Clarence 17.13 (115) v New Norfolk 8.18 (66) – Att: 4,238 at Bellerive Oval
- Sandy Bay 19.20 (134) v Hobart 14.13 (97) – Att: 2,899 at TCA Ground

=== Round 6 ===
(Saturday, 2 May 1970)

- New Norfolk 15.9 (99) v Hobart 13.15 (93) – Att: 2,474 at North Hobart Oval
- Sandy Bay 24.10 (154) v Nth Hobart 11.19 (85) – Att: 2,405 at Queenborough Oval
- Glenorchy 16.13 (109) v Clarence 11.14 (80) – Att: 2,188 at Bellerive Oval

=== Round 7 ===
(Saturday, 9 May 1970)

- Nth Hobart 10.12 (72) v Clarence 9.16 (70) – Att: 5,734 at North Hobart Oval
- Hobart 15.13 (103) v Glenorchy 11.17 (83) – Att: 2,295 at KGV Football Park
- New Norfolk 12.21 (93) v Sandy Bay 6.14 (50) – Att: 3,046 at Boyer Oval

=== Round 8 ===
(Saturday, 16 May 1970)

- Clarence 17.20 (122) v Sandy Bay 16.10 (106) – Att: 5,597 at North Hobart Oval
- Nth Hobart 11.20 (86) v Hobart 12.9 (81) – Att: 2,639 at TCA Ground
- New Norfolk 18.19 (127) v Glenorchy 11.9 (75) – Att: 2,469 at Boyer Oval

=== Round 9 ===
(Saturday, 23 May 1970)

- Nth Hobart 14.15 (99) v New Norfolk 13.13 (91) – Att: 5,349 at North Hobart Oval
- Sandy Bay 18.15 (123) v Glenorchy 14.12 (96) – Att: 2,640 at Queenborough Oval
- Clarence 10.17 (77) v Hobart 8.11 (59) – Att: 2,950 at Bellerive Oval

=== Round 10 ===
(Saturday, 6 June 1970)

- Nth Hobart 15.12 (102) v Glenorchy 13.21 (99) – Att: 2,909 at North Hobart Oval
- New Norfolk 13.13 (91) v Clarence 11.13 (79) – Att: 5,157 at Bellerive Oval *
- Sandy Bay 19.19 (133) v Hobart 6.15 (51) – Att: 3,511 at Queenborough Oval

Note: Record TANFL roster match attendance at Bellerive Oval.

=== Round 11 ===
(Saturday, 13 June 1970)

- Nth Hobart 12.16 (88) v Sandy Bay 10.17 (77) – Att: 4,691 at North Hobart Oval
- Clarence 17.18 (120) v Glenorchy 10.15 (75) – Att: 2,265 at KGV Football Park
- New Norfolk 8.15 (63) v Hobart 6.4 (40) – Att: 1,571 at TCA Ground

=== Round 12 ===
(Saturday, 20 June 1970)

- Glenorchy 16.24 (120) v Hobart 9.4 (58) – Att: 2,668 at North Hobart Oval
- Clarence 17.17 (119) v Nth Hobart 11.10 (76) – Att: 4,311 at Bellerive Oval
- Sandy Bay 17.7 (109) v New Norfolk 7.9 (51) – Att: 2,582 at Boyer Oval

=== Round 13 ===
(Saturday, 27 June 1970)

- Nth Hobart 13.20 (98) v Hobart 11.11 (77) – Att: 2,460 at North Hobart Oval
- Clarence 16.10 (106) v Sandy Bay 13.12 (90) – Att: 5,270 at Queenborough Oval
- Glenorchy 12.16 (88) v New Norfolk 11.5 (71) – Att: 2,488 at KGV Football Park

=== Round 14 ===
(Saturday, 4 July 1970)

- Sandy Bay 9.23 (77) v Glenorchy 6.11 (47) – Att: 3,511 at North Hobart Oval
- Clarence 17.17 (119) v Hobart 11.7 (73) – Att: 2,111 at TCA Ground
- New Norfolk 12.14 (86) v Nth Hobart 7.7 (49) – Att: 1,885 at Boyer Oval

=== Round 15 ===
(Saturday, 11 July 1970)

- Nth Hobart 16.12 (108) v Glenorchy 7.11 (53) – Att: 2,458 at North Hobart Oval
- Clarence 16.10 (106) v Sandy Bay 13.12 (90) – Att: 2,772 at Bellerive Oval
- Sandy Bay 15.19 (109) v Hobart 8.15 (63) – Att: 1,349 at TCA Ground

=== Round 16 ===
(Saturday, 18 July 1970)

- Glenorchy 11.10 (76) v Clarence 11.10 (76) – Att: 3,119 at North Hobart Oval
- New Norfolk 20.19 (139) v Hobart 4.3 (27) – Att: 1,324 at Boyer Oval
- Sandy Bay 16.12 (108) v Nth Hobart 12.5 (77) – Att: 3,921 at Queenborough Oval

=== Round 17 ===
(Saturday, 25 July 1970)

- Clarence 7.14 (56) v Nth Hobart 4.11 (35) – Att: 4,025 at North Hobart Oval
- Hobart 7.14 (56) v Glenorchy 4.12 (36) – Att: 970 at TCA Ground
- Sandy Bay 7.11 (53) v New Norfolk 6.9 (45) – Att: 2,062 at Queenborough Oval

=== Round 18 ===
(Saturday, 1 August 1970)

- New Norfolk 11.16 (82) v Glenorchy 9.11 (65) – Att: 2,225 at North Hobart Oval
- Sandy Bay 18.7 (115) v Clarence 14.15 (99) – Att: 4,717 at Bellerive Oval
- Hobart 10.8 (68) v Nth Hobart 10.8 (68) – Att: 1,951 at TCA Ground

=== Round 19 ===
(Saturday, 8 August 1970)

- Nth Hobart 11.11 (77) v New Norfolk 11.11 (77) – Att: 4,375 at North Hobart Oval
- Clarence 12.14 (86) v Hobart 10.17 (77) – Att: 2,329 at Bellerive Oval
- Sandy Bay 17.11 (113) v Glenorchy 6.13 (49) – Att: 2,081 at Queenborough Oval

Note: North Hobart became the only TANFL team to draw consecutive matches

=== Round 20 ===
(Saturday, 15 August 1970)

- Sandy Bay 15.13 (103) v Hobart 10.8 (68) – Att: 2,833 at North Hobart Oval
- New Norfolk 15.14 (104) v Clarence 11.9 (75) – Att: 2,420 at Boyer Oval
- Nth Hobart 17.15 (117) v Glenorchy 14.16 (100) – Att: 2,023 at KGV Football Park

=== First Semi Final ===
(Saturday, 22 August 1970)

- New Norfolk: 5.5 (35) | 13.9 (87) | 19.13 (127) | 27.15 (177)
- Nth Hobart: 5.3 (33) | 5.6 (36) | 8.10 (58) | 14.13 (97)
- Attendance: 11,607 at North Hobart Oval

=== Second Semi Final ===
(Saturday, 29 August 1970)

- Clarence: 2.5 (17) | 4.6 (30) | 8.9 (57) | 13.13 (91)
- Sandy Bay: 3.1 (19) | 6.5 (41) | 8.5 (53) | 10.9 (69)
- Attendance: 13,241 at North Hobart Oval

=== Preliminary Final ===
(Saturday, 5 September 1970)

- New Norfolk: 3.0 (18) | 7.4 (46) | 9.7 (61) | 13.9 (87)
- Sandy Bay: 3.4 (22) | 4.5 (29) | 9.10 (64) | 11.13 (79)
- Attendance: 12,827 at North Hobart Oval

=== Grand Final ===
(Saturday, 12 September 1970)

- Clarence: 5.8 (38) | 9.11 (65) | 13.14 (92) | 19.16 (130)
- New Norfolk: 1.2 (8) | 3.5 (23) | 8.10 (58) | 10.15 (75)
- Attendance: 24,413 at North Hobart Oval (All-time Tasmanian record until 1979)

Source: All scores and statistics courtesy of the Hobart Mercury and Saturday Evening Mercury (SEM) publications.
