= 1973 TANFL season =

Australian rules football season

- Teams: Clarence Kangaroos; Glenorchy Magpies; Hobart Tigers; New Norfolk Eagles; North Hobart Demons; Sandy Bay Seagulls
- Premiers: Hobart
- Minor premiers: Sandy Bay; 5th minor premiership

Attendance
- Matches played: 61
- Total attendance: 196,739 (3,225 per match)

The 1973 Tasmanian Australian National Football League (TANFL) premiership season was an Australian rules football competition staged in Hobart, Tasmania, over nineteen (19) roster rounds and four (4) finals series matches between 7 April and 15 September 1973.

== Participating Clubs ==
- Clarence District Football Club
- Glenorchy District Football Club
- Hobart Football Club
- New Norfolk District Football Club
- North Hobart Football Club
- Sandy Bay Football Club

=== 1973 TANFL Club Coaches ===
- Robin Norris (Clarence)
- Trevor Sprigg (Glenorchy)
- Alan Appleton (Hobart)
- Geoff Hill (New Norfolk)
- Vin Crowe (North Hobart)
- Rod Olsson (Sandy Bay)

=== TANFL Reserves Grand Final ===
- New Norfolk 14.16 (100) v Sandy Bay 9.16 (70) – North Hobart Oval

=== TANFL Under-19's Grand Final ===
- Glenorchy 12.10 (82) v Buckingham 6.4 (40) – North Hobart Oval

=== State Preliminary Final ===
(Saturday, 22 September 1973)

- Scottsdale 14.15 (99) v Hobart 6.4 (40) – Att: 9,485 at North Hobart Oval

=== State Grand Final ===
(Saturday, 29 September 1973) (Licorice Gallery Article: 1973 State Grand Final)

- Scottsdale: 6.5 (41) | 8.9 (57) | 10.11 (71) | 16.20 (116)
- Cooee: 5.4 (34) | 11.6 (72) | 15.13 (103) | 15.15 (105)
- Attendance: 8,269 at West Park Oval

=== Intrastate Matches ===
Jubilee Shield (Saturday, 30 April 1973)

- NTFA 17.15 (117) v TANFL 12.13 (85) – Att: 4,593 at York Park

Jubilee Shield (Saturday, 26 May 1973)

- NWFU 18.13 (121) v TANFL 14.15 (99) – Att: 6,347 at North Hobart Oval

=== Interstate Match ===
(Saturday, 2 June 1973)

- Victoria 11.23 (89) v Tasmania 8.6 (54) – Att: 13,649 at North Hobart Oval

=== Leading Goalkickers: TANFL ===
- Rod Adams (Sandy Bay) – 96
- Michael Elliot (Sandy Bay) – 59
- Nigel Ricketts (Sandy Bay) – 41
- P.Burke (Glenorchy) – 40

=== Medal Winners ===
- Rod Olsson (Sandy Bay) – William Leitch Medal
- Peter Lynsky (Glenorchy) & Geoff Richardson (New Norfolk) – George Watt Medal (Reserves)
- P.Smith (Clarence) – V.A Geard Medal (Under-19's)
- Bob Cheek (Clarence) – Weller Arnold Medal (Best player in Intrastate matches)

== 1973 TANFL Ladder ==
Pos	Team	Pld	W	L	D	PF	PA	PP	Pts
1	Sandy Bay	19	19	0	0	2315	1465	158.0	76
2	Glenorchy	19	10	9	0	1761	1817	96.9	40
3	Clarence	19	10	9	0	1762	1860	94.7	40
4	Hobart	19	7	12	0	1676	1939	86.4	28
5	New Norfolk	19	6	13	0	1653	1769	93.4	24
6	North Hobart	19	5	14	0	1692	2009	84.2	20

=== Round 1 ===
(Saturday, 7 April 1973)

- Nth Hobart 13.19 (97) v New Norfolk 13.16 (94) – Att: 3,468 at North Hobart Oval
- Sandy Bay 16.15 (111) v Clarence 10.13 (73) – Att: 4,099 at Queenborough Oval
- Hobart 12.12 (84) v Glenorchy 7.16 (58) – Att: 2,737 at KGV Football Park

=== Round 2 ===
(Saturday, 14 April 1973)

- Sandy Bay 16.17 (113) v Glenorchy 12.17 (89) – Att: 3,618 at North Hobart Oval
- Clarence 12.17 (89) v New Norfolk 8.15 (63) – Att: 2,631 at Bellerive Oval
- Hobart 25.11 (161) v Nth Hobart 17.16 (118) – Att: 2,924 at TCA Ground

=== Round 3 ===
(Saturday, 21 April. Monday, 23 April & Wednesday, 25 April 1973)

- Glenorchy 10.18 (78) v New Norfolk 8.12 (60) – Att: 2,484 at North Hobart Oval (Saturday)
- Clarence 18.12 (120) v Nth Hobart 14.16 (100) – Att: 4,860 at North Hobart Oval (Monday)
- Sandy Bay 19.25 (139) v Hobart 10.13 (73) – Att: 7,358 at North Hobart Oval (Wednesday)

=== Round 4 ===
(Saturday, 28 May 1973)

- Clarence 15.23 (113) v Hobart 10.9 (69) – Att: 3,358 at North Hobart Oval
- Nth Hobart 18.17 (125) v Glenorchy 10.13 (73) – Att: 2,414 at KGV Football Park
- Sandy Bay 19.19 (133) v New Norfolk 7.14 (56) – Att: 2,249 at Queenborough Oval

=== Round 5 ===
(Saturday, 5 May 1973)

- Sandy Bay 12.12 (84) v Nth Hobart 10.14 (74) – Att: 4,298 at North Hobart Oval
- Clarence 11.18 (84) v Glenorchy 8.19 (67) – Att: 2,495 at Bellerive Oval
- Hobart 12.14 (86) v New Norfolk 8.16 (64) – Att: 1,565 at Boyer Oval

=== Round 6 ===
(Saturday, 12 May 1973)

- Sandy Bay 26.17 (173) v Clarence 10.7 (67) – Att: 4,941 at North Hobart Oval
- New Norfolk 17.20 (122) v Nth Hobart 4.3 (27) – Att: 1,731 at Boyer Oval
- Hobart 17.12 (114) v Glenorchy 14.14 (98) – Att: 2,135 at TCA Ground

=== Round 7 ===
(Saturday, 19 May 1973)

- Nth Hobart 12.13 (85) v Hobart 11.9 (75) – Att: 3,243 at North Hobart Oval
- Sandy Bay 14.14 (98) v Glenorchy 12.16 (88) – Att: 2,189 at KGV Football Park
- New Norfolk 10.18 (78) v Clarence 5.12 (42) – Att: 1,820 at Boyer Oval

=== Round 8 ===
(Monday, 4 June 1973)

- Sandy Bay 17.14 (116) v Hobart 5.16 (46) – Att: 2,717 at North Hobart Oval
- Clarence 17.16 (118) v Nth Hobart 12.12 (84) – Att: 2,296 at Bellerive Oval
- Glenorchy 14.13 (97) v New Norfolk 11.18 (84) – Att: 2,896 at KGV Football Park

=== Round 9 ===
(Saturday, 9 June 1973)

- Glenorchy 11.17 (83) v Nth Hobart 9.8 (62) – Att: 2,511 at North Hobart Oval
- Hobart 8.17 (65) v Clarence 7.16 (58) – Att: 1,420 at TCA Ground
- Sandy Bay 15.12 (102) v New Norfolk 10.12 (72) – Att: 1,762 at Boyer Oval

=== Round 10 ===
(Saturday, 16 June 1973)

- Glenorchy 17.12 (114) v Clarence 17.8 (110) – Att: 3,569 at North Hobart Oval
- Sandy Bay 19.11 (125) v Nth Hobart 9.14 (68) – Att: 2,444 at Queenborough Oval
- New Norfolk 13.18 (96) v Hobart 11.16 (82) – Att: 1,673 at TCA Ground

=== Round 11 ===
(Saturday, 23 June 1973)

- Nth Hobart 19.14 (128) v New Norfolk 15.14 (104) – Att: 2,763 at North Hobart Oval
- Sandy Bay 20.12 (132) v Clarence 11.19 (85) – Att: 2,841 at Bellerive Oval
- Hobart 23.15 (153) v Glenorchy 15.12 (102) – Att: 2,471 at KGV Football Park

=== Round 12 ===
(Saturday, 30 June 1973)

- Nth Hobart 15.16 (106) v Hobart 11.13 (79) – Att: 2,755 at North Hobart Oval
- Sandy Bay 17.13 (115) v Glenorchy 13.5 (83) – Att: 2,847 at Queenborough Oval
- New Norfolk 17.14 (116) v Clarence 17.10 (112) – Att: 1,693 at Bellerive Oval

=== Round 13 ===
(Saturday, 7 July 1973)

- Clarence 13.18 (96) v Nth Hobart 13.12 (90) – Att: 3,400 at North Hobart Oval
- Sandy Bay 17.16 (118) v Hobart 9.13 (67) – Att: 1,988 at TCA Ground
- Glenorchy 16.8 (104) v New Norfolk 10.14 (74) – Att: 1,696 at Boyer Oval

=== Round 14 ===
(Saturday, 14 July 1973)

- Sandy Bay 17.18 (120) v New Norfolk 10.15 (75) – Att: 2,771 at North Hobart Oval
- Glenorchy 16.22 (118) v Nth Hobart 14.16 (100) – Att: 2,613 at KGV Football Park
- Clarence 17.17 (119) v Hobart 13.10 (88) – Att: 2,772 at Bellerive Oval

=== Round 15 ===
(Saturday, 21 July 1973)

- New Norfolk 14.25 (109) v Hobart 13.10 (88) – Att: 1,934 at North Hobart Oval
- Sandy Bay 15.21 (111) v Nth Hobart 13.10 (88) – Att: 2,247 at Queenborough Oval
- Glenorchy 17.10 (112) v Clarence 13.15 (93) – Att: 3,371 at KGV Football Park

=== Round 16 ===
(Saturday, 28 July 1973)

- Glenorchy 15.15 (105) v Hobart 9.8 (62) – Att: 3,344 at North Hobart Oval
- Sandy Bay 19.20 (134) v Clarence 11.10 (76) – Att: 3,086 at Queenborough Oval
- New Norfolk 21.15 (141) v Nth Hobart 12.10 (82) – Att: 1,677 at Boyer Oval

=== Round 17 ===
(Saturday, 4 August 1973)

- Clarence 12.21 (93) v New Norfolk 9.20 (74) – Att: 2,450 at North Hobart Oval
- Hobart 16.12 (108) v Nth Hobart 13.19 (97) – Att: 1,347 at TCA Ground
- Sandy Bay 18.19 (127) v Glenorchy 16.13 (109) – Att: 3,260 at KGV Football Park

=== Round 18 ===
(Saturday, 11 August 1973)

- Sandy Bay 21.19 (145) v Hobart 9.6 (60) – Att: 2,871 at North Hobart Oval
- Glenorchy 13.17 (95) v New Norfolk 10.12 (72) – Att: 2,370 at KGV Football Park
- Clarence 15.14 (104) v Nth Hobart 9.20 (74) – Att: 2,246 at Bellerive Oval

=== Round 19 ===
(Saturday, 18 August 1973)

- Glenorchy 13.15 (93) v Nth Hobart 12.15 (87) – Att: 2,868 at North Hobart Oval
- Clarence 14.9 (93) v Hobart 11.20 (86) – Att: 2,229 at TCA Ground
- Sandy Bay 18.11 (119) v New Norfolk 9.14 (68) – Att: 1,995 at Boyer Oval

=== First Semi Final ===
(Saturday, 25 August 1973)

- Hobart: 3.3 (21) | 6.6 (42) | 13.7 (85) | 16.14 (110)
- Clarence: 3.2 (20) | 8.7 (55) | 13.7 (85) | 16.10 (106)
- Attendance: 8,256 at North Hobart Oval

=== Second Semi Final ===
(Saturday, 1 September 1973)

- Sandy Bay: 5.0 (30) | 13.0 (78) | 16.4 (100) | 21.9 (135)
- Glenorchy: 2.6 (18) | 3.11 (29) | 7.13 (55) | 11.16 (82)
- Attendance: 9,021 at North Hobart Oval

=== Preliminary Final ===
(Saturday, 8 September 1973)

- Hobart: 4.0 (24) | 7.8 (50) | 14.11 (95) | 18.14 (122)
- Glenorchy: 4.7 (31) | 7.9 (51) | 10.14 (74) | 14.17 (101)
- Attendance: 8,939 at North Hobart Oval

=== Grand Final ===
(Saturday, 15 September 1973)

- Hobart: 2.3 (15) | 5.7 (37) | 8.11 (59) | 11.19 (85)
- Sandy Bay: 3.0 (18) | 4.2 (26) | 8.5 (53) | 10.5 (65)
- Attendance: 14,720 at North Hobart Oval

Source: All scores and statistics courtesy of the Hobart Mercury and Saturday Evening Mercury (SEM) publications.
