= Palfreyman =

Palfreyman is a surname. Notable people with the surname include:

- Brent Palfreyman (born 1945), Australian cricketer
- David Palfreyman (born 1966), English actor, musician, songwriter and poet
- David Palfreyman (born 1945), Australian former Olympic Rower and rowing coach
- George Palfreyman (1893–1936), American college football coach
- Nigel Palfreyman (born 1973), Australian rules footballer
- Stewart Palfreyman (born 1948), former Australian rules footballer
- Thomas Palfreyman (died c. 1589), English author and musician
