= 1960 TANFL season =

Australian rules football season

- Teams: Clarence Kangaroos; Glenorchy Magpies; Hobart Tigers; New Norfolk Eagles; North Hobart Robins; Sandy Bay Seagulls
- Premiers: Hobart
- Minor premiers: Clarence; 1st minor premiership

Attendance
- Matches played: 58
- Total attendance: 203,603 (3,510 per match)

The 1960 Tasmanian Australian National Football League (TANFL) premiership season was an Australian Rules football competition staged in Hobart, Tasmania over eighteen (18) roster rounds and four (4) finals series matches between 9 April and 17 September 1960.

== Participating Clubs ==
- Clarence District Football Club
- Glenorchy District Football Club
- Hobart Football Club
- New Norfolk District Football Club
- North Hobart Football Club
- Sandy Bay Football Club

=== 1960 TANFL Club Coaches ===
- Stuart Spencer (Clarence)
- Jack Rough (Glenorchy)
- Mal Pascoe (Hobart)
- Athol Webb (New Norfolk)
- Darrell Eaton (North Hobart)
- Stan Booth (Sandy Bay)

=== TANFL Reserves Grand Final ===
- Glenorchy 8.11 (59) v Nth Hobart 1.7 (13) – North Hobart Oval

=== TANFL Under-19's Grand Final ===
State Schools Old Boys Football Association (SSOBFA)

- Macalburn 5.12 (42) v Buckingham 5.11 (41) – New Town Oval.

Note: Macalburn were affiliated to Hobart, Buckingham were affiliated to Glenorchy.

=== State Preliminary Final ===
(Saturday, 24 September 1960)

- Burnie Tigers: 3.0 (18) | 4.0 (24) | 8.7 (55) | 9.9 (63)
- Hobart: 1.4 (10) | 5.6 (36) | 6.7 (43) | 9.8 (62)
- Attendance: 4,500 at Devonport Oval

Note: Burnie (NWFU guernseys) and Hobart (TANFL guernseys) wore alternate strips due to a guernsey clash.

=== State Grand Final ===
(Saturday, 1 October 1960)

- City-South: 8.3 (51) | 10.9 (69) | 14.15 (99) | 15.17 (107)
- Burnie Tigers: 0.8 (8) | 5.14 (44) | 9.14 (68) | 12.17 (89)
- Attendance: 9,986 at York Park

=== Intrastate Matches ===
Jubilee Shield (Saturday, 14 May 1960)

- NTFA 14.8 (92) v TANFL 8.13 (61) – Att: 7,030 at York Park

Jubilee Shield (Saturday, 25 June 1960)

- NWFU 13.10 (88) v TANFL 6.16 (52) – Att: 12,972 at North Hobart Oval

=== Interstate Matches ===
Interstate Match (Monday, 13 June 1960)

- Tasmania 13.13 (91) v Victoria 12.12 (84) – Att: 15,600 at York Park

Interstate Match (Saturday, 23 July 1960)

- South Australia 22.16 (148) v Tasmania 12.11 (83) – Att: 36,054 at Adelaide Oval

=== Leading Goalkickers: TANFL ===
- Mal Pascoe (Hobart) – 57
- Rex Garwood (New Norfolk) – 41
- Arthur Cole (Hobart) – 38
- David Collins (North Hobart) – 35
- R.Armstrong (Clarence) – 34
- G.Sansom (Clarence) – 34

=== Medal Winners ===
- Stuart Spencer (Clarence) – William Leitch Medal
- K.Turner (North Hobart) – George Watt Medal (Reserves)
- Roy Isaacs (Buckingham) – V.A Geard Medal (Under-19's)
- John Noble (North Hobart) – Weller Arnold Medal (Best player in Intrastate matches)

== 1960 TANFL Ladder ==
Pos	Team	Pld	W	L	D	PF	PA	PP	Pts
1	Clarence	18	12	6	0	1339	1106	121.1	48
2	Hobart	18	12	6	0	1544	1332	115.9	48
3	North Hobart	18	9	9	0	1208	1253	96.4	36
4	New Norfolk	18	8	10	0	1253	1187	105.6	32
5	Sandy Bay	18	7	11	0	1138	1330	85.6	28
6	Glenorchy	18	6	12	0	1076	1229	87.6	24

=== Round 1 ===
(Saturday, 9 April. Saturday, 16 April & Monday, 18 April 1960)

- Clarence 15.11 (101) v Hobart 13.12 (90) – Att: 7,704 at North Hobart Oval (9 April)
- Glenorchy 5.15 (45) v Nth Hobart 5.6 (36) – Att: 6,539 at North Hobart Oval (16 April)
- Sandy Bay 14.15 (99) v New Norfolk 12.13 (85) – Att: 6,813 at North Hobart Oval (18 April)

=== Round 2 ===
(Saturday, 30 April 1960)

- Hobart 21.13 (139) v Nth Hobart 15.7 (97) – Att: 3,184 at North Hobart Oval
- New Norfolk 8.9 (57) v Glenorchy 5.12 (42) – Att: 2,787 at KGV Park
- Sandy Bay 14.15 (99) v Clarence 6.16 (52) – Att: 3,303 at Bellerive Oval

Note: This round was postponed by one week due to flooding in Southern Tasmania.

=== Round 3 ===
(Saturday, 7 May 1960)

- Hobart 13.13 (91) v Glenorchy 7.13 (55) – Att: 3,710 at North Hobart Oval
- Sandy Bay 12.18 (90) v Nth Hobart 12.8 (80) – Att: 2,470 at Queenborough Oval
- Clarence 11.12 (78) v New Norfolk 5.12 (42) – Att: 2,740 at Boyer Oval

=== Round 4 ===
(Monday, 14 May 1960)

- Nth Hobart 9.6 (60) v New Norfolk 8.7 (55) – Att: 2,565 at North Hobart Oval
- Sandy Bay 12.10 (82) v Hobart 9.11 (65) – Att: 2,187 at Queenborough Oval
- Clarence 9.14 (68) v Glenorchy 8.10 (58) – Att: 2,645 at KGV Park

=== Round 5 ===
(Saturday, 21 May 1960)

- Hobart 13.17 (95) v New Norfolk 10.19 (79) – Att: 3,345 at North Hobart Oval
- Glenorchy 13.9 (87) v Sandy Bay 10.5 (65) – Att: 2,580 at Queenborough Oval
- Clarence 14.16 (100) v Nth Hobart 3.5 (23) – Att: 2,494 at Bellerive Oval

=== Round 6 ===
(Saturday, 28 May 1960)

- Glenorchy 7.11 (53) v Nth Hobart 7.4 (46) – Att: 4,392 at North Hobart Oval
- Hobart 13.8 (86) v Clarence 8.22 (70) – Att: 3,671 at Bellerive Oval
- New Norfolk 11.6 (72) v Sandy Bay 7.17 (59) – Att: 2,533 at Boyer Oval

=== Round 7 ===
(Saturday, 4 June 1960)

- Nth Hobart 16.14 (110) v Hobart 13.5 (83) – Att: 3,490 at North Hobart Oval
- Clarence 14.4 (88) v Sandy Bay 10.9 (69) – Att: 3,490 at Queenborough Oval
- New Norfolk 9.13 (67) v Glenorchy 8.7 (55) – Att: 2,830 at Boyer Oval

=== Round 8 ===
(Saturday, 11 June 1960)

- Nth Hobart 14.13 (97) v Sandy Bay 8.13 (61) – Att: 3,595 at North Hobart Oval
- Glenorchy 7.11 (53) v Hobart 6.11 (47) – Att: 2,571 at KGV Park
- Clarence 13.21 (99) v New Norfolk 11.6 (72) – Att: 3,031 at Bellerive Oval

=== Round 9 ===
(Monday, 13 June 1960)

- Hobart 15.13 (103) v Sandy Bay 9.12 (66) – Att: 2,619 at North Hobart Oval
- Nth Hobart 11.19 (85) v New Norfolk 11.9 (75) – Att: 2,137 at KGV Park
- Glenorchy 13.15 (93) v Clarence 9.9 (63) – Att: 2,534 at Bellerive Oval

=== Round 10 ===
(Saturday, 18 June 1960)

- Nth Hobart 13.8 (86) v Clarence 9.7 (61) – Att: 5,550 at North Hobart Oval
- Sandy Bay 10.17 (77) v Glenorchy 6.17 (53) – Att: 2,260 at KGV Park
- New Norfolk 9.15 (69) v Hobart 8.8 (56) – Att: 2,141 at Boyer Oval

=== Round 11 ===
(Saturday, 2 July 1960)

- Hobart 9.14 (68) v Clarence 8.10 (58) – Att: 3,467 at North Hobart Oval
- Sandy Bay 8.8 (56) v New Norfolk 7.9 (51) – Att: 1,887 at Queenborough Oval
- Glenorchy 11.9 (75) v Nth Hobart 8.16 (64) – Att: 2,584 at KGV Park

=== Round 12 ===
(Saturday, 9 July 1960)

- Hobart 13.17 (95) v Nth Hobart 9.12 (66) – Att: 3,631 at North Hobart Oval
- New Norfolk 15.18 (108) v Glenorchy 5.18 (48) – Att: 2,807 at KGV Park
- Clarence 12.18 (90) v Sandy Bay 2.11 (23) – Att: 2,431 at Bellerive Oval

=== Round 13 ===
(Saturday, 16 July 1960)

- Hobart 20.10 (130) v Glenorchy 14.11 (95) – Att: 3,621 at North Hobart Oval
- Nth Hobart 11.12 (78) v Sandy Bay 7.5 (47) – Att: 2,069 at Queenborough Oval
- New Norfolk 8.14 (62) v Clarence 7.8 (50) – Att: 2,951 at Boyer Oval

=== Round 14 ===
(Saturday, 23 July 1960)

- Hobart 11.7 (73) v Sandy Bay 9.9 (63) – Att: 2,346 at North Hobart Oval
- Clarence 6.6 (42) v Glenorchy 5.11 (41) – Att: 2,207 at KGV Park
- Nth Hobart 7.12 (54) v New Norfolk 7.11 (53) – Att: 2,177 at Boyer Oval

=== Round 15 ===
(Saturday, 30 July 1960)

- Hobart 10.12 (72) v New Norfolk 9.13 (67) – Att: 3,304 at North Hobart Oval
- Sandy Bay 10.12 (72) v Glenorchy 6.10 (46) – Att: 1,936 at Queenborough Oval
- Clarence 13.14 (92) v Nth Hobart 10.14 (74) – Att: 2,594 at Bellerive Oval

=== Round 16 ===
(Saturday, 6 August 1960)

- Nth Hobart 7.9 (51) v Glenorchy 6.12 (48) – Att: 3,691 at North Hobart Oval
- Clarence 13.18 (96) v Hobart 7.11 (53) – Att: 3,157 at Bellerive Oval
- New Norfolk 12.11 (83) v Sandy Bay 7.9 (51) – Att: 2,257 at Boyer Oval

=== Round 17 ===
(Saturday, 13 August 1960)

- Hobart 7.11 (53) v Nth Hobart 5.13 (43) – Att: 3,325 at North Hobart Oval
- Clarence 10.9 (69) v Sandy Bay 5.7 (37) – Att: 1,725 at Queenborough Oval
- New Norfolk 15.10 (100) v Glenorchy 10.6 (66) – Att: 2,082 at Boyer Oval

=== Round 18 ===
(Saturday, 11 August 1962)

- Nth Hobart 8.11 (59) v Sandy Bay 4.4 (28) – Att: 2,337 at North Hobart Oval
- Hobart 22.13 (145) v Glenorchy 9.9 (63) – Att: 1,060 at KGV Park
- Clarence 9.8 (62) v New Norfolk 2.14 (26) – Att: 2,467 at Bellerive Oval

=== First Semi Final ===
(Saturday, 27 August 1960)

- Nth Hobart: 3.1 (19) | 6.4 (40) | 10.8 (68) | 13.10 (88)
- New Norfolk: 3.1 (19) | 3.5 (23) | 3.10 (28) | 5.13 (43)
- Attendance: 9,927 at North Hobart Oval

=== Second Semi Final ===
(Saturday, 3 September 1960)

- Hobart: 6.6 (42) | 7.9 (51) | 12.14 (86) | 14.20 (104)
- Clarence: 4.4 (28) | 7.11 (53) | 11.13 (79) | 13.15 (93)
- Attendance: 11,235 at North Hobart Oval

=== Preliminary Final ===
(Saturday, 10 September 1960)

- Nth Hobart: 3.1 (19) | 5.5 (35) | 7.8 (50) | 11.9 (75)
- Clarence: 5.2 (32) | 7.3 (45) | 8.8 (56) | 10.11 (71)
- Attendance: 12,467 at North Hobart Oval

=== Grand Final ===
(Saturday, 17 September 1960)

- Hobart: 3.2 (20) | 5.3 (33) | 6.7 (43) | 6.7 (43)
- Nth Hobart: 1.2 (8) | 5.3 (33) | 6.3 (39) | 6.3 (39)
- Attendance: 6,001 at North Hobart Oval
