= 1946 TANFL season =

Australian rules football season

- Teams: Hobart Tigers; New Town Magpies; North Hobart Redlegs; Sandy Bay Seagulls
- Premiers: Sandy Bay
- Minor premiers: New Town

Attendance
- Matches played: 33
- Total attendance: 105,186 (3,187 per match)

The 1946 Tasmanian Australian National Football League (TANFL) premiership season was an Australian Rules football competition staged in Hobart, Tasmania over fifteen roster rounds and three finals series matches between 4 May and 28 September 1946.

== Participating clubs ==
- Hobart Football Club
- New Town District Football Club
- North Hobart Football Club
- Sandy Bay Football Club

=== 1946 TANFL Club Coaches ===
- Noel Gray Sr & Ron Savage (Hobart)
- Brian Kelly (New Town)
- Arthur O'Brien & Dinny Kelleher (North Hobart)
- Lance Collins (Sandy Bay)

=== TANFL Reserves Grand Final ===
- New Town 7.10 (52) v Sandy Bay 5.2 (32) – North Hobart Oval

=== TANFL Under-19's Grand Final ===
State Schools Old Boys Football Association (SSOBFA)

- Buckingham 5.5 (35) v South East 2.4 (16) – New Town Oval

Note: Buckingham were aligned with New Town, South East were aligned with Sandy Bay.

=== State Grand Final ===
(Saturday, 5 October 1946)

- Sandy Bay: 3.6 (24) | 5.7 (37) | 11.9 (75) | 13.13 (91)
- Nth Launceston: 2.1 (13) | 6.8 (44) | 10.9 (69) | 12.13 (85)
- Attendance: 7,852 at North Hobart Oval

=== Intrastate Matches ===
Jubilee Shield (Saturday, 8 June 1946)

- TANFL 15.14 (104) v NWFU 13.13 (91) – Att: 6,200 at North Hobart Oval

Jubilee Shield (Saturday, 29 June 1946)

- NTFA 14.9 (93) v TANFL 12.11 (83) – Att: 9,700 at York Park

Jubilee Shield (Saturday, 20 July 1946)

- TANFL 17.12 (114) v NTFA 8.3 (51) – Att: 9,420 at North Hobart Oval

Jubilee Shield (Saturday, 10 August 1946)

- TANFL 15.22 (112) v NWFU 13.21 (99) – Att: 7,500 at West Park Oval

Inter-Association Match (Saturday, 29 June 1946)

- TANFL 16.19 (115) v Huon FA 14.15 (99) – Att: 700 at Franklin Football Ground

Inter-Association Match (Saturday, 10 August 1946)

- TANFL 15.13 (103) v Huon FA 10.16 (76) – Att: 2,500 at North Hobart Oval

=== Leading Goalkickers: TANFL ===
- Alf Cook (New Town) – 58

=== Medal winners ===
- Ernie Pilkington (Sandy Bay) – William Leitch Medal
- Alan Hughes (Macalburn) – V.A Geard Medal (Under-19's)

== 1946 TANFL Ladder ==
Pos	Team	Pld	W	L	D	PF	PA	PP	Pts
1	New Town	15	9	4	2	1462	1124	130.1	40
2	North Hobart	15	9	5	1	1153	1054	109.4	38
3	Sandy Bay	15	8	6	1	1375	1172	117.3	34
4	Hobart	15	2	13	0	991	1631	60.8	8

=== Round 1 ===
(Saturday, 4 May 1946)

- Nth Hobart 11.13 (79) v New Town 10.13 (73) – Att: 3,400 at North Hobart Oval
- Sandy Bay 14.18 (102) v Hobart 5.5 (35) – Att: 1,120 at Queenborough Oval

=== Round 2 ===
(Saturday, 11 May 1946)

- Nth Hobart 13.17 (95) v Hobart 14.8 (92) – Att: 1,800 at North Hobart Oval
- New Town 17.19 (121) v Sandy Bay 15.11 (101) – Att: 3,300 at TCA Ground

=== Round 3 ===
(Saturday, 18 May 1946)

- New Town 15.22 (112) v Hobart 6.15 (51) – Att: 1,060 at North Hobart Oval
- Sandy Bay 15.10 (100) v Nth Hobart 10.12 (72) – Att: 1,085 at TCA Ground

=== Round 4 ===
(Saturday, 25 May 1946)

- Nth Hobart 14.22 (106) v New Town 13.10 (88) – Att: 3,250 at North Hobart Oval
- Sandy Bay 19.13 (127) v Hobart 11.21 (87) – Att: 1,200 at TCA Ground

=== Round 5 ===
(Saturday, 1 June 1946)

- New Town 11.20 (86) v Sandy Bay 12.5 (77) – Att: 3,900 at North Hobart Oval
- Hobart 12.14 (86) v Nth Hobart 10.16 (76) – Att: 1,100 at TCA Ground *

Note: Hobart Football Club's maiden TANFL victory.

=== Round 6 ===
(Monday, 10 June 1946)

- Nth Hobart 16.21 (117) v Sandy Bay 14.20 (104) – Att: 4,830 at North Hobart Oval
- New Town 21.19 (145) v Hobart 12.14 (86) – Att: 1,690 at TCA Ground

=== Round 7 ===
(Saturday, 15 June & Monday, 17 June 1946)

- Nth Hobart 4.12 (36) v New Town 4.12 (36) – Att: 5,970 at North Hobart Oval
- Sandy Bay 14.18 (102) v Hobart 11.11 (77) – Att: 3,622 at North Hobart Oval (Monday)

=== Round 8 ===
(Saturday, 22 June 1946)

- Sandy Bay 13.15 (93) v New Town 12.13 (85) – Att: 3,500 at North Hobart Oval
- Nth Hobart 12.19 (91) v Hobart 8.7 (55) – Att: 1,247 at TCA Ground

=== Round 9 ===
(Saturday, 6 July 1946)

- Hobart 17.13 (115) v New Town 12.9 (81) – Att: 1,290 at North Hobart Oval
- Sandy Bay 7.17 (59) v Nth Hobart 7.7 (49) – Att: 2,210 at TCA Ground

=== Round 10 ===
(Saturday, 13 July 1946)

- New Town 9.16 (70) v Nth Hobart 6.12 (48) – Att: 2,290 at North Hobart Oval
- Sandy Bay 21.16 (142) v Hobart 7.10 (52) – Att: 1,060 at TCA Ground

=== Round 11 ===
(Saturday, 27 July 1946)

- New Town 15.13 (103) v Sandy Bay 15.13 (103) – Att: 5,000 at North Hobart Oval
- Nth Hobart 15.16 (106) v Hobart 8.10 (58) – Att: 608 at TCA Ground

=== Round 12 ===
(Saturday, 3 August 1946)

- Nth Hobart 8.11 (59) v Sandy Bay 7.12 (54) – Att: 4,610 at North Hobart Oval
- New Town 16.21 (117) v Hobart 7.13 (55) – Att: 475 at TCA Ground

=== Round 13 ===
(Saturday, 17 August 1946)

- Sandy Bay 16.6 (102) v Hobart 9.5 (59) – Att: 906 at North Hobart Oval
- New Town 13.11 (89) v Nth Hobart 11.6 (72) – Att: 3,550 at TCA Ground

=== Round 14 ===
(Saturday, 31 August 1946)

- Nth Hobart 9.14 (68) v Hobart 5.7 (37) – Att: 1,010 at North Hobart Oval
- New Town 13.13 (91) v Sandy Bay 8.8 (56) – Att: 5,200 at TCA Ground

Note: This round was postponed by one week due to inclement weather conditions.

=== Round 15 ===
(Saturday, 7 September 1946)

- Nth Hobart 12.7 (79) v Sandy Bay 7.11 (53) – Att: 4,000 at North Hobart Oval
- New Town 25.15 (165) v Hobart 6.10 (46) – Att: 688 at TCA Ground *

Note: Alf Cook (New Town) scores 14 goals, second highest individual total of all time to 1946.

=== Semi-final ===
(Saturday, 14 September 1946)

- Sandy Bay: 1.3 (9) | 6.9 (45) | 9.14 (68) | 12.18 (90)
- Nth Hobart: 4.2 (26) | 4.5 (29) | 7.10 (52) | 10.13 (73)
- Attendance: 6,900 at North Hobart Oval

=== Final ===
(Saturday, 21 September 1946)

- Sandy Bay: 1.7 (13) | 6.9 (45) | 10.14 (74) | 17.19 (121)
- New Town: 1.4 (10) | 5.8 (38) | 11.13 (79) | 15.19 (109)
- Attendance: 9,400 at North Hobart Oval

=== Grand Final ===
(Saturday, 28 September 1946)

- Sandy Bay: 1.3 (9) | 4.9 (33) | 7.10 (52) | 12.16 (88)
- New Town: 1.4 (10) | 1.10 (16) | 4.16 (40) | 5.16 (46)
- Attendance: 12,500 at North Hobart Oval
