= William Leitch Medal =

The William Leitch Medal, named after the highly regarded former Australian rules player and Tasmanian Football Administrator William Douglas Leitch (1863–1943), was an annual award which was presented to the best and fairest player in the TANFL/TFL Statewide League.

At various times prior to 1930 and between 1935 and 1939 the TFL award was known by other names. From 1942 to 1944 the competition was suspended due to World War Two. Following the collapse of both the Tasmanian Football League (TFL) in 1998 and its replacement competitions (the TSFL in 1999 and the SWL in December 2000), the award was suspended until its revival in 2004, awarded to the best and fairest player in the SFL Premier League and from 2009, awarded to the best and fairest player in the SFL.

== Winners by year ==
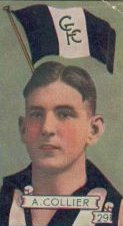
Albert Collier won the inaugural William Leitch Medal in 1931

- W H GILL MEMORIAL TROPHY
- 1925 – Eric "Leisha" Smith (Lefroy Football Club) – Also tied on the same number of votes were Horrie Gorringe & Athol Paul who have never been recognised as joint winners.
- 1926 – No award was made
- WILSON BAILEY MEDAL
- 1927 – Keith Roberts (New Town Football Club) - Wilson Bailey Medal
- 1928 – George Cole - (New Town Football Club) - Wilson Bailey Medal
- 1929 – Alan Leitch (New Town Football Club) - Wilson Bailey Medal
- 1930 – Jack Billett (Cananore) - Wilson Bailey Medal
- WILLIAM LEITCH MEDAL
- 1931 – Albert Collier (Cananore)
- 1932 – Len Pye (North Hobart) & – Pat Hartnett (Cananore)
- 1933 – Eric Hanlon (New Town) & – Burnell Edwards (North Hobart)
- 1934 – Stan Sproule (North Hobart) & – Eric Hanlon (New Town)
- GEORGE WATT MEDAL
- 1935 – Len Powell - (North Hobart)
- 1936 – Eric Zschech - (Lefroy Football Club)
- 1937 – Len Pye - (North Hobart)
- 1938 – Len Pye - (North Hobart)
- 1939 – Eric Zschech - (Lefroy Football Club)
- 1940 – Geoff Kilmartin (Cananore)
- 1941 – Max Abbott (North Hobart)
- 1942 – no award - competition suspended due to WW2
- 1943 – no award - competition suspended due to WW2
- 1944 – no award - competition suspended due to WW2
- WILLIAM LEITCH MEDAL
- 1945 – Noel Reid (North Hobart)
- 1946 – Ernie Pilkington (Sandy Bay)
- 1947 – Jack Sullivan (Hobart)
- 1948 – Jim Brown (New Norfolk)
- 1949 – Hamish Yaxley (Clarence)
- 1950 – Warren Smart (Sandy Bay)
- 1951 – Rex Garwood (New Town)
- 1952 – Cliff Busch (New Norfolk)
- 1953 – Terry Cashion (Sandy Bay)
- 1954 – Bruce Roe (New Norfolk)
- 1955 – Rex Garwood (New Norfolk)
- 1956 – Robert Lewis (Sandy Bay)
- 1957 – Trevor Leo (Hobart)
- 1958 – Rex Garwood (New Norfolk)
- 1959 – Mal Pascoe (Hobart) & – Murray Steele (Sandy Bay)
- 1960 – Stuart Spencer (Clarence)
- 1961 – Roger Browning (New Norfolk)
- 1962 – Roger Browning (New Norfolk)
- 1963 – Geoff Whitton (Sandy Bay)
- 1964 – David Sullivan (Hobart)
- 1965 – Burnie Payne (Hobart)
- 1966 – Burnie Payne (Hobart)
- 1967 – John Richmond (Clarence), – Stuart Spencer (Clarence) & – Neville Johnston (Glenorchy)
- 1968 – Robert Lucas (Clarence)
- 1969 – Roger Steele (Sandy Bay)
- 1970 – Roger Steele (Sandy Bay)
- 1971 – Rodney Olsson (Sandy Bay)
- 1972 – Ricky Graham (New Norfolk)
- 1973 – Rodney Olsson (Sandy Bay)
- 1974 – Tony Browning (New Norfolk)
- 1975 – Trevor Sprigg (Glenorchy)
- 1976 – Trevor Sorrell (Clarence)
- 1977 – Mick Hawkins (North Hobart)
- 1978 – Peter Hudson (Glenorchy)
- 1979 – Peter Hudson (Glenorchy)
- 1980 – Gary Linton (Glenorchy)
- 1981 – Robbie Dykes (New Norfolk)
- 1982 – Tony Martyn (Sandy Bay)
- 1983 – Tony Martyn (Sandy Bay)
- 1984 – Scott Wade (Hobart)
- 1985 – Graham Hunnibell (New Norfolk)

=== William Leitch Medal Winners: TFL Statewide League (1986–2000) ===
- 1986 – Andy Bennett (Sandy Bay)
- 1987 – David Code (Devonport Blues)
- 1988 – Adrian Fletcher (Glenorchy) & – Michael Seddon (Sandy Bay)
- 1989 – Scott Wade (Clarence)
- 1990 – Ricky Hanlon (New Norfolk)
- 1991 – Gary Williamson (Clarence)
- 1992 – Jason Gibson (North Launceston)
- 1993 – Daryn Perry (North Hobart) & – Rene Peters (New Norfolk)
- 1994 – Michael Maple (North Hobart)
- 1995 – Danny Noonan (Clarence) & – Geoff Wiggins (Sandy Bay)
- 1996 – Danny Noonan (Clarence)
- 1997 – Fabian Carelli (Devonport Power)
- 1998 – Wayne Weidemann (Devonport Power)
- 1999 – Ben Atkin (Glenorchy), – Matthew Jones (Clarence) & – Darren Trevena (Nth Bombers)
- 2000 – Nathan Howard (Nth Bombers)

=== William Leitch Medal Winners: SFL & SFL Premier League (2001-2003) ===
- 2001 – Damien Dillon (Cygnet) - Medal Awarded Retrospectively
- 2002 – Matthew Jones (New Norfolk) - Medal Awarded Retrospectively
- 2003 – Brendon Bolton (North Hobart) - Medal Awarded Retrospectively

=== William Leitch Medal Winners: SFL Premier League (2004–2008) & SFL (2009–Present) ===
- 2004 – Brock Ackerley (New Norfolk) & – Roger Belcher (New Norfolk)
- 2005 – David Newett (Glenorchy)
- 2006 – Jesse Crouch (Glenorchy)
- 2007 – Roger Belcher (New Norfolk)
- 2008 – Shane Piuselli (Glenorchy)
- 2009 – Roger Belcher (New Norfolk)
- 2010 – James Lange (Huonville Lions)
- 2011 – Nathan Ross (New Norfolk)
- 2012 – Michael Thompson(New Norfolk)
- 2013 – Nathan Ross (New Norfolk)
- 2014 – Caden Wilson (New Norfolk)
- 2015 – Nathan Brown (Claremont)
- 2016 – Troy Cunliffe (Lindisfarne)
- 2017 – Troy Cunliffe (Lindisfarne)
- 2018 – Jarrod Lawler (Huonville Lions)
- 2019 – Mitch Walker (Claremont)
- 2020 – Ethan Brock (Huonville Lions)
- 2021 – Thor Boscott (Cygnet)
- 2022 – Josh Green (Lindisfarne)
- 2023- Darcy Gardner (Brighton) & Sheldon Smith (Lindisfarne)
- 2024- Sheldon Smith (Lindisfarne)
- 2025- Josh Green (Clarence) & Sam Siggins (Lauderdale) (17 votes each)
- 2026- Bailey Gordon (Lauderdale) (18 votes)
