= Andy Bennett =

Australian rules footballer and coach

Personal information
- Full name: Andrew Bennett
- Born: 30 March 1955 (age 71); Broken Hill, NSW
- Original team: Central Broken Hill (BHFL)
- Height: 189 cm (6 ft 2 in)
- Weight: 86 kg (190 lb)
- Positions: Key position, ruck

Playing career^{1}
Years	Club	Games (Goals)
1975–1979	South Adelaide	111 (162)
1980–1983	Hawthorn	21 (18)
1985	St Kilda	14 (1)
Total		146 (181)
- ^{1} Playing statistics correct to the end of 1985.

Career highlights
- 1986 William Leitch Medalist; 6 interstate games for South Australia (three State-of-Origin); 4 interstate games for Tasmania

Andrew Bennett (born 30 March 1955) is a former Australian rules footballer who played 110 games for South Adelaide in the South Australian National Football League (SANFL) from 1974 to 1979 and 35 games for Hawthorn and St Kilda in the Victorian Football League (VFL) from 1980 to 1985 VFL season.

Making his senior debut for South Adelaide in 1975, Bennett soon became a leading player in the SANFL, representing South Australia six times, including at the 1979 Perth State of Origin Carnival and in 1980. Playing as a ruck-rover he was named South Australia's best player in the match against Victoria at Football Park in mid 1979. He kicked 4 goals against Victoria in the State-of-Origin carnival played later that year in Perth.

Bennett was a regular at Hawthorn in the 1980 VFL season, but had the rest of his time at the club ruined by injury. After crossing to St Kilda in 1985 he managed to add a further 14 games to his tally and the following season became captain-coach of Tasmanian Football League club Sandy Bay and won the 1986 William Leitch Medal. In 1986 Bennett guided his team to its first Grand Final appearance since 1978 but was unsuccessful. He coached and played at Sandy Bay for three years including another finals appearance in 1988, his final year as captain-coach.

From 1986 to 1988 Bennett represented Tasmania five times including captaining the side for three games in 1986. He coached the Tasmanian representative side in three games in 1987.

In 1989 Bennett returned to South Australia where he coached West Torrens Football Club for two seasons until the Club amalgamated with the Woodville Football Club for the 1991 season. Bennett then returned to Tasmania and played for Sandy Bay Football Club for 1991 and part of the 1992 season when a serious facial injury ended his playing career. In total Bennett played 65 games for Sandy Bay. In 2006 he was named as one of Sandy Bay's best ever 25 players in a celebration of the club's time in Tasmanian Football.

Bennett took up a position as a boundary-rider for ABC Television's TFL broadcasts in the latter part of 1992 before he returned to coaching in 1993, taking up the senior coaching position with North Hobart for two seasons, guiding them to a Preliminary Final in his first season followed by a disappointing 1994 season whereby he retired as coach at season's end.

Bennett, was in charge of the Tasmanian interstate team between 1995 and 1998 and steered them to wins over WAFL, SANFL and VFL representative teams. The 1995 game against South Australia is to be inducted into the Tasmanian Football Hall of Fame as a memorable game in 2014. He coached the State Under 18 team in the National Championships in Melbourne in 2000. A teacher and school principal Bennett contested the 1998 state election as a Labor candidate for Denison but was unsuccessful.

In 2007 he was inducted into the Tasmanian Football Hall of Fame, for his achievements as a coach. Bennett was a commentator with ABC1 for 17 years, commentating on Tasmanian Devils VFL matches and ABC1's Tasmanian State League broadcasts. He was also a columnist with the Hobart Mercury newspaper.

== Sources ==
- Holmesby, Russell and Main, Jim (2007). The Encyclopedia of AFL Footballers. 7th ed. Melbourne: Bas Publishing.
