= Tony Martyn =

Australian rules footballer

Personal information
- Born: 9 March 1957 (age 69)
- Original team: Sandy Bay (TANFL)
- Height: 182 cm (6 ft 0 in)
- Weight: 77 kg (170 lb)

Playing career^{1}
Years	Club	Games (Goals)
1979–1981	Melbourne	32 (5)
- ^{1} Playing statistics correct to the end of 1981.

Tony Martyn (born 9 March 1957) is a former Australian rules footballer who played for Melbourne in the Victorian Football League (VFL), Port Adelaide in the South Australian National Football League (SANFL) and with Tasmanian Australian National Football League (TANFL) club Sandy Bay. He could play in various positions including half forward, as a centreman and on the ball.

Martyn played his early football in Tasmania and in 1976, his debut season, he was named as the TANFL's 'Rookie of the Year'. He was a member of the strong Sandy Bay team of the late 1970s and played in three consecutive premierships from 1976 to 1978. After winning their Best and Fairest in 1978 he opted to transfer to Melbourne and try his hand at VFL football.

Martyn appeared in 32 senior games for Melbourne before crossing to Port Adelaide during the 1981 season. It was his only season in South Australia but he was fortunate enough to play in a premiership side with Port.

In 1982, Martyn returned to Sandy Bay and won the William Leitch Medal that season. He won another the following year as well as his third Sandy Bay Best and fairest award. Martyn was a Tasmania interstate representative and won the Lefroy Medal as the state's best performed player in 1982. His career ended in disappointment with a loss in the 1986 Grand Final to Glenorchy and he finished with 129 senior games.
