= Stewart Palfreyman =

Australian rules footballer

Personal information
- Full name: Stewart Palfreyman
- Born: 30 December 1948 (age 77)
- Original team: Sandy Bay
- Height: 180 cm (5 ft 11 in)
- Weight: 83 kg (183 lb)
- Position: Rover

Playing career^{1}
Years	Club	Games (Goals)
1970–71	Geelong	37 (3)
- ^{1} Playing statistics correct to the end of 1971.

Stewart Palfreyman (born 30 December 1948) is a former Australian rules footballer who played for Geelong in the Victorian Football League (VFL) during the early 1970s.

Palfreyman was a rover and played his early football at Sandy Bay in Tasmania, with his brother Brent.

He spent two seasons in the VFL and missed just five games out of the 44 that Geelong played. Palfreyman then returned to Tasmania and represented the state at the 1972 Perth Carnival.
