= Terry Cashion =

Australian rules footballer (1921–2011)

Personal information
- Full name: Terence Robert Cashion
- Born: 7 April 1921
- Died: 8 October 2011 (aged 90)
- Height: 178 cm (5 ft 10 in)
- Weight: 76 kg (168 lb)
- Position: Rover

Playing career
Years	Club	Games (Goals)
1939–1941	New Town	
1942	South Melbourne	5 (5)
1946–1947	Clarence	
1948–1951	Longford	
1952–1954	Sandy Bay	

Career highlights
- Club: TFL premiership (1952); William Leitch Medal (1953); NTFA Best and Fairest (1948,1950,1951); Clarence Best and Fairest (1946,1947); Longford Best and Fairest (1948,1949,1951); Sandy Bay Best and Fairest (1952,1953); Representative: 14 State games for Tasmania; Tassie Medal (1950); Stancombe Trophy (1947,1950); Honours: Australian Football Hall of Fame (2022); Tasmanian Football Team of the Century; Tasmanian Football Icon (2005); Longford Team of the Century

Terence Robert Cashion (7 April 1921 – 8 October 2011) was an Australian rules footballer from Tasmania who played numerous representative matches for the state and also played for South Melbourne in the Victorian Football League (VFL).

In 2022 he was inducted into the Australian Football Hall of Fame.

== Early life and junior career ==
Terry was born to parents Albert and Mary Cashion (née Clements) in April 1921 when the family lived in Goulburn Street, North Hobart.

Cashion first began to come under notice as a player during his junior career with Buckingham.

== Senior career in Tasmania ==
A rover, he had started his senior career with New Town in the TANFL in 1939 and played there until the end of the 1941 season. After time in the army during World War Two he returned to the league in 1947 where he played with Clarence. In the 1947 Hobart Carnival he made his debut for the Tasmanian interstate team and won the Stancombe Trophy. He won the trophy again at the 1950 Brisbane Carnival and also became the only Tasmanian player to have won a Tassie Medal.

He had a stint at Longford from 1948 to 1951 where he won the NTFA best and fairest Tasman Shields Trophy three times. In 1948 Cashion tied with Harry Styles for the award. He won it outright in 1950, and again tied for the award in 1951, this time with Darrel Crosswell.

Cashion then returned to the TFL with Sandy Bay where he won a William Leitch Medal in 1953, before retiring at the end of the season having played 193 club and representative games. Cashion won a total of seven best and fairest awards at his various Tasmanian clubs.

== On the mainland and military service ==
Cashion moved to Victoria in 1941 to enlist in the Citizen's Military Forces, the predecessor to the Army Reserve. St Kilda originally approached him to play for them, but he refused their terms. Ex Richmond player Eric Zschech who had moved to Tasmania, tried to set up a deal with Richmond. In the meantime Cashion had received an offer from South Melbourne, but Zscech told him not to sign until he had heard from Richmond. After waiting three days with no word from the club, he accepted South Melbourne's offer. Only to find a letter waiting for him from Richmond at his accommodation.

In 1942, he would play five games for South Melbourne, kicking five goals, before injuring his knee in the Round 5 game against Carlton, bringing his VFL career to an end.

He would enlist in the permanent military in August 1942. Serving largely in Australia as a Tank driver. He would again injure his knee in a service football game in Cairns in September 1944. Cashion would see combat in the Battle of Balikpapan in July 1945, before returning to Australia in 1946.

== Personal life ==
In day-to-day life after returning to Tasmania he had a career as a carpenter involved in the house building trade.

In June 2004, he was selected as a rover in Tasmania's official 'Team of the Century' and in 2009 was inducted as an icon in the Tasmanian Football Hall of Fame.
