= Geoff Whitton =

Australian rules footballer

Personal information
- Full name: Geoff Whitton
- Born: 1 February 1942 (age 84)
- Original team: Sandy Bay
- Height: 185 cm (6 ft 1 in)
- Weight: 83 kg (183 lb)
- Position: Ruckman

Playing career^{1}
Years	Club	Games (Goals)
1967–68	Melbourne	8 (0)
- ^{1} Playing statistics correct to the end of 1968.

Geoff Whitton (born 1 February 1942) is a former Australian rules footballer who played for Melbourne in the Victorian Football League (VFL).

== Early career ==
Whitton played his early football at Tasmanian club Sandy Bay and he won a William Leitch Medal while playing for them in 1963. He was then a member of Sandy Bay's 1964 premiership team and represented Tasmania at the 1966 Hobart Carnival. He also polled well in the club Best and Fairest award, winning in 1963 and 1964, and finishing third in 1966.

== Melbourne ==
A ruckman, he spent two seasons at Melbourne but struggled to break into the seniors and could only manage eight appearances.

== Return to Sandy Bay ==
Later on, Whitton turned to coaching and came out of the wilderness to spend a brief but successful stint in 1990 at Sandy Bay in the TFL Statewide League. He took over a struggling Seagull outfit after the mid-season sacking of Shane Williams, taking them to the finals and eventually bowing out to eventual premier Hobart in the First Semi Final after looking particularly dangerous until then. Whitton stood down as coach immediately following that loss and has had no involvement in football since.
