= Jack Graham (Australian footballer, born 1916) =

Australian rules footballer (1916–1984)

Personal information
- Full name: John Edward Graham
- Born: 7 May 1916; Rainbow, Victoria
- Died: 14 April 1984 (aged 67); Queensland
- Original team: Red Cliffs
- Height: 6 ft 3 in (191 cm)
- Weight: 15 st 8 lb (99 kg)
- Positions: Ruckman, utility

Playing career^{1}
Years	Club	Games (Goals)
1935–1949	South Melbourne	227 (233)
- ^{1} Playing statistics correct to the end of 1949.

Career highlights
- South Melbourne best and fairest 1945; South Melbourne leading goalkicker 1941, 1948

John Edward Graham (7 May 1916 – 14 April 1984) was an Australian rules footballer who played for South Melbourne in the Victorian Football League (VFL).

Graham was a utility player but played mostly as a ruckman. Over the course of his career he was one of the few players who used the place kick.

He played in losing grand finals with South Melbourne in 1936 and 1945. He polled well in a couple of Brownlow Medal counts with a seventh placing in 1937 and an equal sixth in 1941. He later served as coach of South Adelaide and also played briefly for the club.

His shin was lacerated in a football game, and the wound never healed properly. He had surgery after retirement to repair the wound and died from surgical complications. His son Ricky Graham and grandson Ben Graham both became league footballers at Geelong.
