= Michael Seddon =

Australian rules footballer

Personal information
- Full name: Michael Seddon
- Born: 13 May 1958 (age 68)
- Original team: Sandy Bay (TFL)
- Height: 187 cm (6 ft 2 in)
- Weight: 81 kg (179 lb)
- Position: Ruck-rover

Playing career^{1}
Years	Club	Games (Goals)
1980–1985	Melbourne	57 (24)
- ^{1} Playing statistics correct to the end of 1985.

Michael Seddon (born 13 May 1958) is a former Australian rules footballer who played for the Melbourne Football Club in the Victorian Football League (VFL) during the early 1980s.

Recruited from Tasmanian Football League club Sandy Bay, Seddon was Melbourne's ruck-rover for four seasons before returning to Tasmania. He shared the William Leitch Medal in 1988 with Glenorchy's Adrian Fletcher.
