= Ricky Graham =

Australian rules footballer

Personal information
- Born: 21 June 1946
- Died: 16 November 2023 (aged 77)
- Original team: Adelaide Boys High School
- Height: 180 cm (5 ft 11 in)
- Weight: 81 kg (179 lb)

Playing career^{1}
Years	Club	Games (Goals)
1965–1969	Geelong	35 (4)
- ^{1} Playing statistics correct to the end of 1969.

Ricky Graham (21 June 1946 – 16 November 2023) was an Australian rules footballer who played for Geelong in the Victorian Football League (VFL) during the late 1960s.

He also captain-coached Tasmanian Football League (TFL) club New Norfolk. Ricky comes from a famous footballing family with his father Jack and nephew Ben each playing over 200 games in the VFL/AFL.

Mostly a centreman and flanker during his career, Graham played originally with Geelong Districts. He made his debut for Geelong's VFL side in 1965 and appeared in the seniors sporadically over the course of his five-year career. He spent a lot of his time in the reserves and won a Gardiner Medal in 1967. His efforts in the reserves that year earned him selection as 20th man in the Grand Final against Richmond but he finished on the losing side. Graham did however kick one of his four VFL goals in the game, from outside 50, with such long kicking being a feature of his game.

Graham was appointed captain-coach of New Norfolk in 1970 and won the William Leitch Medal two years later. He had the distinction of captaining Tasmania at the 1972 Perth Carnival. From 1973 to 1976 he coached Ulverstone and steered them to the 1976 Tasmanian State Premiership. He finished his coaching career in Queensland with Windsor-Zillmere.

In his retirement from football Graham had a brief stint as a Brisbane Bears board member and became a property developer on the Gold Coast.
