= Rex Garwood =

Australian sportsman

Rex Elvyn Garwood (15 May 1930 – 16 May 2007) was an Australian sportsman who played Australian rules football in the Tasmanian Football League and first-class cricket for Tasmania during the 1950s.

== Football ==
=== TFL career ===
Best known for his exploits on the football field, Garwood is the only person in history to have won three William Leitch Medals. He was mostly used as a ruck rover but could also play in key positions such as centre half-forward.

Garwood made his league debut in 1950 with New Town. He won his first Leitch Medal the following season, topped New Town's goalkicking and played in their 1951 premiership team. In 1953 he was appointed club captain and helped them to another premiership.

He transferred to New Norfolk in 1954 and was immediately given the role of captain-coach. The Tasmanian won his second Leitch Medal in 1955 and at the conclusion of the 1957 season was relieved of his coaching duties. He won another Leitch Medal in 1958 before his retirement in 1960.

=== State representative ===
Garwood was a regular Tasmanian interstate representative. He played for his state in the 1953 Adelaide Carnival, 1956 Perth Carnival and the 1958 Melbourne Carnival. At the Perth Carnival he was captain-coach and kicked seven goals in a game against the VFA. Garwood also captained Tasmania in interstate matches during 1955 and 1957.

== Cricket ==
Garwood played five first-class matches for Tasmania between the 1952/53 and 1955/56 Australian cricket seasons. He was a top order batsman but didn't manage to score a half century in his career, with a best of 49 which came against Victoria in 1953–54. In all he scored 189 runs at 18.90 and took five wickets at 32.00.

== Later years ==
In his later years Garwood excelled at Bowls and was a winner of several Tasmanian championships. Garwood became the first Tasmanian in 13 years to represent Australia when he appeared for his country in a Test match against New Zealand in 1985. He won a gold medal in the pairs championship of the 1985 Australia Games.

He was the first person inducted into the Tasmanian Sporting Hall of Fame in 1987 and in 2004 was named on the interchange bench in the official Tasmanian Football 'Teams of the Century'.

== See also ==
- List of Tasmanian representative cricketers
