= Rodney Olsson =

Australian rules footballer and coach

Personal information
- Full name: Rodney Stuart Olsson
- Born: 23 April 1942 (age 84)
- Original team: Old Scotch
- Height: 187 cm (6 ft 2 in)
- Weight: 89 kg (196 lb)

Playing career^{1}
Years	Club	Games (Goals)
1962–1969	Hawthorn	116 (64)

Coaching career
Years	Club	Games (W–L–D)
1976–1979	Geelong	91 (45–46–0)
- ^{1} Playing statistics correct to the end of 1969.

Rodney Stuart Olsson (born 23 April 1942) is a former Australian rules footballer and coach who played with Hawthorn in the VFL during the 1960s.

Olsson was a ruck-rover for Hawthorn but when he started his career he played as a half forward as well as on the half back flanks. He was a member of the Hawthorn side which lost the 1963 Grand Final to Geelong, the club he would later coach.

He spent the early 1970s in Tasmania as playing coach of Sandy Bay. In what would be the club's strongest era he steered them to the 1971 and 1972 TFL premierships and to another Grand Final in 1973, which they lost despite winning 20 consecutive games that year. As a player, he also had success and was a William Leitch Medalist in both 1971 and 1973.

In 1976 Olsson returned to the VFL and he coached Geelong for four seasons, twice making the finals.
