= Gordon Bowman =

Australian rules footballer (1927–2013)

Personal information
- Full name: Gordon Richard Bowman
- Born: 10 February 1927
- Died: 14 September 2013 (aged 86)
- Original team: East Malvern
- Debut: Round 5, 1945, Melbourne vs. Geelong, at Punt Road
- Height: 175 cm (5 ft 9 in)
- Weight: 73 kg (161 lb)

Playing career^{1}
Years	Club	Games (Goals)
1945–1950	Melbourne	53 (9)
1950–1951	Hawthorn	29 (2)
Total		82 (11)
- ^{1} Playing statistics correct to the end of 1951.

Gordon Richard Bowman (10 February 1927 – 14 September 2013) was an Australian rules footballer who played for Melbourne and Hawthorn in the Victorian Football League (VFL).

Bowman, originally from East Malvern, was a member of Melbourne's 1948 premiership team as a half forward flanker. He joined a struggling Hawthorn side in 1950 and remained with the club until the end of the 1951 VFL season.

In the 1950s he played in Tasmania with Sandy Bay where he captained the club for seven years, including a premiership in 1952. Such was his impact at the club that in 2001 Bowman was named as one of Sandy Bay's official 'Best 25 Players'. Bowman also captained the Tasmanian state side during this period.

Later, Bowman transferred to Queensland side Mayne where he played for five seasons for two premierships before a final move in 1967 to New South Wales side Newtown, where he played in their 1967 and 1968 premierships, retiring aged 42 after the 1969 Grand Final which Newtown lost. Bowman is the only known Australian rules player to have played in premiership sides in four different states.

== Sources ==
- Atkinson, G. (1982) Everything you ever wanted to know about Australian rules football but couldn't be bothered asking, The Five Mile Press: Melbourne. ISBN 0 86788 009 0.
- Holmesby, Russell and Main, Jim (2007). The Encyclopedia of AFL Footballers. 7th ed. Melbourne: Bas Publishing.
