= Brent Palfreyman =

Australian cricketer (born 1945)

Brent Palfreyman OAM
Personal information
- Full name: Brent Aris Hardcastle Palfreyman
- Born: 20 January 1945 (age 81); Hobart, Tasmania, Australia
- Batting: Right-handed
- Bowling: Right-arm medium
- Role: Middle-order batsman

Domestic team information
- Years: Team
- 1965/66–1972/73: Tasmania

Career statistics
Competition	First-class	List A
Matches	6	2
Runs scored	91	33
Batting average	11.37	16.50
100s/50s	0/0	0/0
Top score	30	17
Balls bowled	161	–
Wickets	0	–
Bowling average	–	–
5 wickets in innings	–	–
10 wickets in match	–	–
Best bowling	–	–
Catches/stumpings	2/–	0/–
- Source: CricketArchive, 19 April 2023

Brent Aris Hardcastle Palfreyman (born 20 January 1945) is a former Australian first-class cricketer who played for Tasmania. He was born at Hobart in 1945.

Palfreyman never played Sheffield Shield cricket, his six first-class appearances all came against foreign touring sides. On his first-class debut against the Marylebone Cricket Club in 1966, Palfreyman was bowled by David Brown for six and didn't bat in the second innings. He also went for 34 from four overs of medium pace bowling in the first innings and took a catch to dismiss David Allen .

He had to wait another five years to represent Tasmania again at first-class level and it was once more against the touring MCC. In the first of two matches, he fell victim to Peter Lever then Derek Underwood, for 3 and 20 respectively. His second appearance was for a Tasmania Combined XI but the match was ruined by rain and only 47 overs were possible, although he managed to catch to dismiss Colin Cowdrey.

The following summer he was picked in the Tasmanian team to play the World XI. Against a bowling line-up consisting of players to the calibre of Gary Sobers, Tony Greig and Bishan Bedi, Palfreyman made his highest first-class score of 30 before being dismissed by the Indian spinner. Later in the week he made another appearance against the World XI, this time for the Combined Tasmanian outfit and he made 22 in his only innings.

His last summer of first-class cricket was in 1972/73 when he represented Tasmania against Pakistan. The Tasmanians bowled first and Palfreyman went for 41 runs off his seven overs but threw the ball which ran out Talat Ali. When it was his turn to bat, Palfreyman was dismissed by Intikhab Alam for a duck, with the Pakistani finishing with his career best figures of 8-54. After Tasmania followed on, Palfreyman yet again lost his wicket to a spin bowler, this time Nasim-ul-Ghani for one run.

In addition to his first-class career, Palfreyman played two limited overs matches for Tasmania in the national One Day Competition, both quarter finals which Tasmania lost.

At the 1992 Cricket World Cup, Palfreyman was the match referee for a match between Australia and Zimbabwe in Hobart.

Palfreyman was also a successful Australian rules footballer, who played in the Tasmanian Football League for Sandy Bay. A forward, he was the TFL leading goal-kicker in 1969 with 51 goals and again in 1970 with 67 goals. He was a member of the 1971 Sandy Bay premiership team which in 2007 was inducted into the Tasmanian Football Hall of Fame. His brother, Stewart Palfreyman, played for Geelong.

Palfreyman, an accountant, went into cricket administration after ending his playing career and has served as the chairman of the Tasmanian Cricket Association.
