= Shane Williams (Australian footballer) =

Australian rules footballer and coach

Personal information
- Full name: Shane Williams
- Born: 14 August 1959 (age 67)
- Original team: North Hobart
- Height: 184 cm (6 ft 0 in)
- Weight: 89 kg (196 lb)
- Position: Half forward flanker

Playing career^{1}
Years	Club	Games (Goals)
1979–1983	Richmond	27 (14)
1985–1987	Geelong	21 (7)
1987–1988	Footscray	13 (9)
Total		61 (30)
- ^{1} Playing statistics correct to the end of 1988.

Shane Williams (born 14 August 1959) is a former Australian rules footballer who played with Richmond, Geelong and Footscray in the Victorian Football League (VFL) during the 1980s.

Originally playing in Melbourne with Essex Heights, a Richmond feeder club, he impressed with his speed and skills. Williams, a half forward flanker, had a VFL career plagued by injuries and could only manage six senior appearances in his first three years at Richmond. He was on the wing when Richmond lost the 1982 Grand Final, having broken into the team earlier in the year and played 18 successive games leading up to the premiership decider.

After not playing a single game in 1984, the North Hobart recruit crossed to Geelong the following season and managed 16 games in his first year. He then suffered a shoulder injury and was offloaded to Footscray during the 1987 season where he would finish his career. He currently resides in Hobart with his family.
