= Sandy Bay Football Club =

Sandy Bay

Names
- Full name: Sandy Bay District Football Club
- Nickname: Seagulls
- Motto: "The Game Above All"
- Club song: "Seagulls, Seagulls, That's Our Name!"

Club details
- Founded: 1944
- Dissolved: 1997; 29 years ago
- Colours
- Competition: Tasmanian Football League (1st. season: 1945)
- Grounds: Queenborough Oval (capacity: 4,000)
- North Hobart Oval (capacity: 18,000)

Uniforms
Home

The Sandy Bay Football Club was an Australian rules football club based in Sandy Bay, Tasmania. The team participated in the Tasmanian Football League from 1945 to 1997.

== Club history ==
The club was founded in November 1944 as a result of a meeting called by the late Bill Barwick at Wrest Point Riviera (now Wrest Point Casino). With World War II in its final stages it became clear that some former TANFL clubs would not survive and as a result, the League's Constitution was amended to provide for district football. In 1945 four clubs, Sandy Bay, North Hobart, New Town and Hobart, took part in the revamped competition.

Sandy Bay adopted the colours of Royal Blue and White, the playing jumper was Royal Blue and White with a white seagull on the breast. This was used by the club between 1945–1966 and from 1967 onwards, the club wore a Blue and White vertical striped playing jumper. Sandy Bay was given permission by the Hobart City Council to use Queenborough Oval in Sandy Bay as its home ground and a weatherboard changeroom was erected on the site of where the Palfreyman Stand and Pavilion would be built twenty years later. Sandy Bay's emblem was the Seagull, generally thought to be named after all the seagulls that hung around the waterfront suburb where the club was located.

Sandy Bay team posing for the photographer, c. 1950.

Sandy Bay participated in the Tasmanian Football League with a strong degree of success in its first three decades in the competition, participating in fifteen TFL Grand Finals between 1945 and 1978 (including eight consecutive Grand Finals from 1971 to 1978) and winning the Tasmanian State Premiership twice in 1946 and 1971. But after losing the 1979 TANFL Preliminary Final by 19 points to Clarence, the club's era of dominance was over. Another problem looming for Sandy Bay was that during their remarkable period of sustained success during the 1970s, the demographic of their area had begun to change to a more upmarket occupancy and as a result, their supporter base withered away badly during this time. Home games at Queenborough Oval reflected this trend where their average home attendances had fallen from a 3,823-average in 1970 to just a 995-average by 1980.

It was during this time that the Hobart Mercury and other sports commentators began to headlines calls for the club to vacate Queenborough Oval and relocate to either the North Hobart Oval or into the Kingborough region, south of Hobart. Despite improving attendances at home in 1981 and 1982, the Seagulls made the move to North Hobart Oval in 1983, where they played all of their home fixtures at the ground. Buoyed by increased attendances, the club made it all the way to the Preliminary Final, where it suffered a 53-point loss to New Norfolk. But the success of the 1983 season proved to be mirage, as the club sunk back down the ladder, struggling for attendances.

With the beginning of the new TFL Statewide League competition in 1986, the Seagulls made a permanent return to Queenborough, and with solid home crowds, the club had a brilliant season. At one stage the Seaguls won 13 matches in succession under Andy Bennett, leading them into their first Grand Final since 1978. But the Seagulls juggernaut stopped in spectacular fashion on Grand Final day, where they trailed badly all day en route to a 32-point defeat at the hands of Glenorchy.

From 1987 onwards, it was a case of doom and gloom for the struggling Seagulls. Their supporter base was continuing to fall and the club was struggling financially, despite a strong finish to the 1990 season, in which they made it to the First Semi Final and held a 38-point lead early in the match before being overrun by eventual premier, Hobart by 33 points. The bottom fell out of the club only eighteen months later. During the 1992 season, Sandy Bay required an immediate cash injection of $70,000 in the middle of the season in order to keep the club afloat until the end of the season. A 'Save The Bay' campaign was hastily organised and charity matches took place in order to raise funds for what was now an ailing club.

After various TFL and media-driven merger attempts over a number of years, the Bay moved back to North Hobart Oval in 1994, when the club made its last finals appearance. After finishing second on the ladder during the roster season, they would make it to the Preliminary Final, but the club suffered from a dreadful start to the match and despite a second half rally, ultimately bowed out to New Norfolk by 26-points. From 1995 the Seagulls battled on as more merger attempts were foist upon them, but no more success came its way. In 1997, president Bill Sorell, announced that the club would be wound up at the completion of the season.

The Seagulls final home match at Queenborough took place on Sunday, 27 July 1997, when they hosted Glenorchy. Sandy Bay were beaten convincingly by 101-points. Three weeks later it would be all over for the Sandy Bay Football Club, their final match taking place at Bellerive Oval on 16 August 1997, when they suffered a 76-point defeat to Clarence amid emotional scenes and a standing ovation from the crowd as they left the ground for the final time. A short time later, the club was wound up and closed down.

== Summary ==
- Home ground – Queenborough Oval & North Hobart Oval
- Established – 1945
- Playing colours – Blue & White
- Emblem – Seagulls
- Club theme song – "Seagulls, Seagulls, that's our name!" (Tune: "California Here I Come")
- Motto – "The Game Above All"
- Affiliations – TANFL & TFL Statewide League (1945–1997)
- Total matches played – 1,037 (522–502–13) * includes 12 matches played in State Preliminary Finals, State Grand Finals and Winfield Statewide Cup (5–7–0)

== Statistics ==
=== Club record games holder ===
- 315 – Bob Lahey

=== Record home attendance ===
- 7,976 – Sandy Bay v North Hobart at North Hobart Oval on 19 April 1965
- 6,070 – Sandy Bay v Glenorchy at Queenborough Oval on 9 May 1964

=== Record match attendance ===
- 20,775 – Sandy Bay v New Norfolk at North Hobart Oval on 12 September 1964 (1964 TANFL Grand Final)

=== Club record score ===
- 30.12 (192) v Launceston 9.14 (68) at North Hobart Oval on 21 August 1994.

== Honours ==
=== Club ===
- Tasmanian Football League
  - Premierships (8): 1946, 1952, 1964, 1971, 1972, 1976, 1977, 1978
  - Runners-Up (8): 1945, 1953, 1958, 1963, 1973, 1974, 1975, 1986
- Tasmanian State Premierships (2): 1946, 1971

=== Individual ===
Medal winners:

William Leitch Medalists

- 1946 – Ernie Pilkington
- 1950 – Bill Smart
- 1953 – Terry Cashion
- 1956 – Bob Lewis
- 1959 – Murray Steele (Tied)
- 1963 – Geoff Whitton
- 1969 – Roger Steele
- 1970 – Roger Steele
- 1971 – Rodney Olsson
- 1973 – Rodney Olsson
- 1982 – Tony Martyn
- 1983 – Tony Martyn
- 1986 – Andy Bennett
- 1988 – Michael Seddon (Tied)
- 1995 – Geoff Wiggins (Tied)

George Watt Medal winners

- 1947 – A.Neil Clarke
- 1950 – R.Toulmin
- 1951 – R.Toulmin
- 1961 – B.Beckett
- 1969 – L.Pilkington
- 1976 – John Mundy
- 1978 – Henri Pastoor
- 1986 – Craig Randall & Mark Radford.

V. A. Geard Medal winners

- 1969 - Peter Unsworth
- 1975 – Michael Seddon
- 1980 – Alistair Davies
- 1982 – Peter Sherwood
- 1983 – Robert Newton
- 1985 – Sam Synnott

D. R. Plaister Medal winners

- 1987 – Paul Burnell

Lefroy Medal winners

- 1954 – Gordon Bowman
- 1959 – Rex Geard
- 1971 – Kerry Doran
- 1981 – Chris Saunders
- 1982 – Tony Martyn

=== Competition leading goalkickers ===
TANFL & TFL Statewide League Leading Goalkickers:

- 1947 – Lance Collins – (50)
- 1948 – Ian Westell – (57)
- 1950 – Ian Westell – (83)
- 1952 – Ian Westell – (66)
- 1954 – Ian Westell – (68)
- 1955 – Ian Westell – (88)
- 1969 – Brent Palfreyman – (51)
- 1970 – Brent Palfreyman – (67)
- 1973 – Rod Adams – (96)

== Sandy Bay Football Club: Senior Coaches ==
- 1945: Jack Rogers
- 1946: Lance Collins
- 1947: Lance Collins
- 1948: Ernie Pilkington
- 1949: Ernie Pilkington
- 1950: Jack Rogers
- 1951: Bert Lucas
- 1952: Gordon Bowman
- 1953: Gordon Bowman
- 1954: Gordon Bowman
- 1955: Gordon Bowman
- 1956: Gordon Bowman
- 1957: Gordon Bowman
- 1958: Gordon Bowman
- 1959: Terry Cashion
- 1960: Terry Cashion
- 1961: Terry Cashion
- 1962: Stan Booth
- 1963: Rex Geard
- 1966: Rex Geard
- 1967: Ray Giblett
- 1968: Ray Giblett
- 1969: Ray Giblett
- 1970: Rodney Olsson
- 1971: Rodney Olsson
- 1972: Rodney Olsson
- 1973: Rodney Olsson
- 1974: Rodney Olsson
- 1975: Rodney Olsson
- 1976: Paul Sproule
- 1977: Paul Sproule
- 1978: Paul Sproule
- 1979: Graeme Mackey
- 1980: Graeme Mackey
- 1981: Graeme Mackey
- 1982: Gary Linton
- 1983: Paul Sproule
- 1984: Paul Sproule
- 1985: Tim Maxwell
- 1986: Andy Bennett
- 1987: Andy Bennett
- 1988: Andy Bennett
- 1989: Shane Williams
- 1990: Shane Williams & Geoff Whitton
- 1991: Paul Jeffrey
- 1992: Paul Jeffrey
- 1993: Chris Fagan
- 1994: Chris Fagan
- 1995: Michael Hibberd & L.Spaulding
- 1996: Lance Spaulding
- 1997: Troy Clarke

== Bibliography ==
- Club profile at Fullpointsfooty.net
- Football: The People's Game by B. T. 'Buck' Anderton (2004)
