= North Hobart Oval =

Sports venue in North Hobart, Tasmania

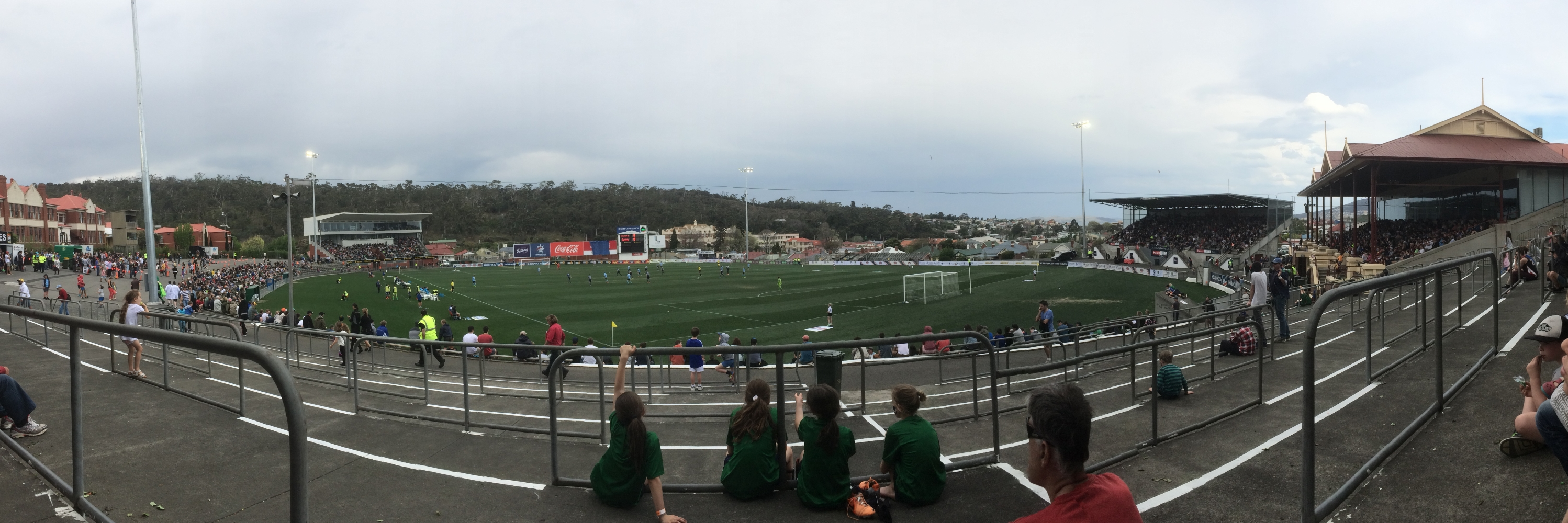
- North Hobart Oval in 2014
- Interactive map of North Hobart Oval
- Address: Ryde Street & Argyle St; North Hobart, Tasmania
- Coordinates: 42°52′4″S 147°18′57″E
- Owner: City of Hobart
- Operator: City of Hobart
- Capacity: 11,135
- Field size: 150 m × 105 m (492 ft × 344 ft)
- Public transit: Buses

Construction
- Groundbreaking: 1921; 105 years ago
- Opened: 1922; 104 years ago
- Cost: A$1.2 million (redevelopment)

Tenants
- Current tenants: North Hobart Football Club (1922–2013; 2018–); North Melbourne (2019–2022, 2024–); Tasmania Devils Academy (2019–); Tasmania Football Club (2026–); Tasmania Rugby League Team (1955–); Former tenants: Hobart City Football Club (2014–2017); DOSA Football Club (2010–2013); Hobart Tigers (1945, 1954–1960, 1986–1997); Sandy Bay Seagulls (1983–1984, 1993–1997); Southern Cats (1998–1999); Lefroy Football Club (1922–1941); Fitzroy Football Club (1952, 1991–1992); Tassie Mariners (1996–2006); Tasmania Devils (2001–2005); Melbourne Storm (1998, 2012, 2017 trials); Melbourne Rebels (2013 trial); Melbourne Victory FC (2014 pre-season); Western United FC (2022–2024); Socceroos XI (1957)

North Hobart Oval is a sports venue located in the Tasmanian suburb of North Hobart. It is widely regarded as the traditional home of Australian rules football in Tasmania, but has also been used for other sports including soccer, rugby league, rugby union, cricket and athletics.

The ground holds the record crowd for Australian rules football in Tasmania and the highest for any football code in the state, when 24,968 people attended the 1979 TANFL grand final.

As of 2026, North Hobart Oval is the home of the North Hobart Football Club in the Southern Football League (SFL). The ground is also used by the Tasmania Football Club in the Victorian Football League (VFL) and the VFL Women's (VFLW), the Tasmania Devils Academy in the Talent League, North Melbourne in the AFL Women's (AFLW), and the Tasmania Rugby League Team in the Affiliated States Championship.

== History ==
North Hobart Oval started its existence as Hobart Town's brickfields in 1844 before becoming a convict women's housing site, an immigration depot and an invalid persons' depot before closing in 1882 whereby the land became a rubbish dump until it was acquired for construction of a football stadium in 1921. The first official match to take place on North Hobart Oval was a Tasmanian Football League (TFL) match between Lefroy and New Town on 6 May 1922, the match was won by Lefroy (9.8.62 to 7.13.55) before 1,000 people.

=== Football ===
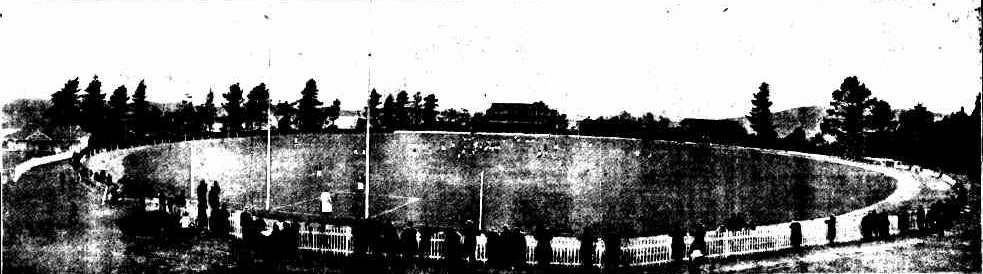
Cananore vs North Hobart at the North Hobart Oval in 1922 drew a crowd of more than 5,000

North Hobart Oval became League Headquarters for the TFL/TANFL/TFL Statewide League in 1922 and remained so until the League was disbanded in 2000. The ground hosted a total of 74 TFL grand finals between 1922–1999 and also hosted the Tasmanian State Grand Final on 20 occasions between 1923 and 1975, also hosting the Winfield Statewide Cup Grand Final in 1980. The final TFL match to be held at the ground was the 2000 SWL Preliminary Final between North Hobart and North Launceston (trading as the Hobart Demons and Northern Bombers at the time) which resulted in a narrow win to the Northern Bombers. After pressure from Northern TFL clubs, notably the Northern Bombers, the TFL scheduled the 2000 Grand Final to be played at Launceston's York Park, marking the first (and ultimately last) TFL Grand Final to be held away from North Hobart Oval since 1921.

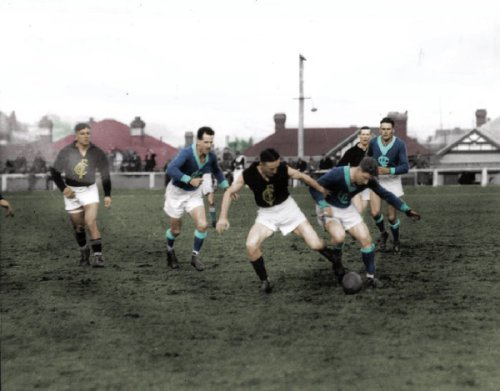
Cananore v Lefroy in 1938.

The first official radio broadcast of a Tasmanian Football League match took place at North Hobart on 9 May 1931 when former Cananore player "Dinah" Green commentated on the match between North Hobart and Lefroy for radio station 7ZL. After the disbandment of the TFL, the Southern Football League made the ground its Grand Final venue in both the Premier and Regional competitions and has done since 2000, it also hosts the Old Scholars Football Association Grand Final each year. The Tasmanian Devils VFL side also played its Southern home fixtures at North Hobart from its inception in 2001 until AFL Tasmania moved the team to Bellerive Oval in 2005 where its Centre Of Excellence was established and it could more adequately host corporate functions.

=== Australian football carnivals ===
North Hobart Oval has hosted three Australian National Football Carnivals. The first was in August 1924, which was won by Victoria before an official attendance of 60,705 for the entire carnival. In 1947 a total of 67,271 attended the carnival which was played in deplorable conditions - including one match where a dog ran onto the ground and buried a saveloy in the mud in the centre of the ground. Victorian once again triumphed, this time on percentage. The 1966 Carnival was the last to be played in Tasmania. A total attendance of 91,347 were present to view the matches played and once again, Victoria took the title defeating Western Australia in the final.

=== Interstate and state of origin matches ===
The ground hosted numerous intrastate, interstate and state of origin clashes in its history. Some of the most memorable are Tasmania's triumph over Western Australia by two points in 1970 and the three State Of Origin matches held there in 1989 where 12,342 saw Tasmania hold Victoria to halftime before Victoria raced away to win. 24 June 1990 saw Tasmania finally get its revenge on Victoria, with a crowd of 18,653 packing North Hobart Oval, Tasmania raced away in the last quarter before a roaring crowd to record a 33-point win, its first over Victoria since 1960.

And in 1991 a peculiar draw from the Australian Football League (AFL) scheduled the match to be played at 11am on a Tuesday morning (a working day in Hobart) - despite this, 14,086-people turned out to watch Tasmania fall agonisingly short after leading Victoria B for much of the game, with the Victoria B rushing home with a late flurry to win by 12 points. Subsequently, through the rest of the 1990s Tasmania went on to defeat the South Australia, the Western Australia and Victoria (VFA), all at North Hobart Oval.

=== VFL/AFL and TFL matches ===
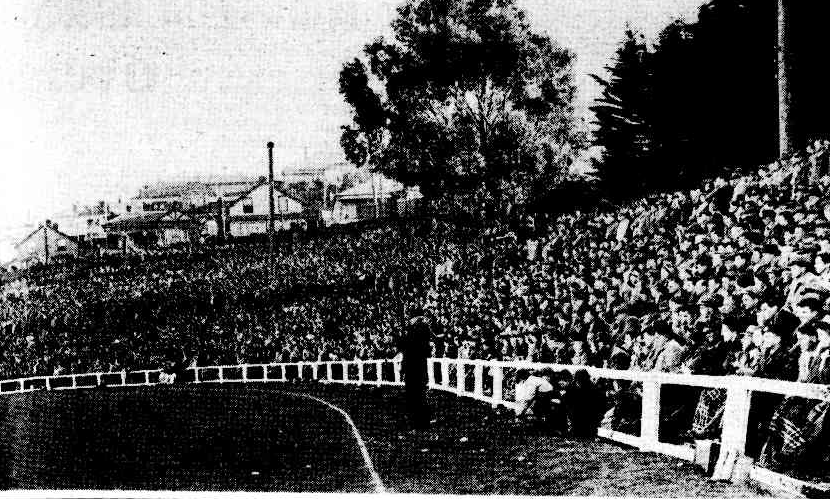
A record crowd of 18,387 packed the North Hobart Ground to see VFL clubs Fitzroy and Melbourne in 1952

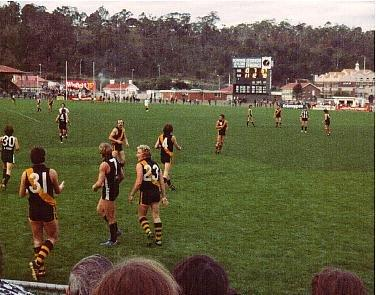
Hobart v Glenorchy Winfield Cup Semi Final in 1980

North Hobart's first VFL/AFL match took place (as part of National Day Round) on 14 June 1952, when 18,387 crammed in to witness Fitzroy beat Melbourne by 20 points, 13.12 (90) to 10.10 (70). Fitzroy later hosted two AFL premiership matches in each of 1991 and 1992 but, due to the uncompetitive nature of Fitzroy at the time (including a 157-point belting by Hawthorn, the club's worst ever defeat) crowds were lower than expected and the cash-strapped Lions pulled out of the experiment at the end of 1992.

There were numerous other Foster's Cup and Ansett Cup pre-season matches held there during the 1990s. The largest crowd for any of these matches was over 19,300 in 1996 for a Hydro Challenge pre-season practice match between the previous season's grand finalists, Carlton and Geelong which was won by Carlton.

=== Other notable events ===
North Hobart Oval has hosted numerous other events throughout its long history. Cricket, Association football (soccer), Rugby League, Rugby Union, Anzac Day sports events and athletics have all been staged there at various times. An Australian XI played an association football friendly against Hungarian club Ferencvárosi TC in 1957, and two world records were established at North Hobart in athletics when Betty Cuthbert set a new world record for the 220-yard sprint on 7 March 1960 and Ron Clarke beat Vladimir Kuts 5000 metres record on 16 January 1965. A NRL match between the Melbourne Storm and the Brisbane Broncos was played at the ground in 2012. A Super Rugby Pacific match between the New South Wales Waratahs and the Melbourne Rebels was played at the ground in 2013.

In 1959 a Billy Graham crusade set an all-time attendance record for the ground with a crowd in excess of 25,000 attending, and in 1987, thousands attended a Military Tattoo at the ground.

=== Development ===
The first of the grandstands to be built at North Hobart was the Ryde Street (George Miller) Stand in late-1921 which was badly damaged by fire in June 2012 and has since been rebuilt.

The Argyle Street Stand (known today as the Horrie Gorringe Stand) was an 840-seat stand that began construction in 1923 and was opened in time for the 1924 Australian National Football Carnival. It remained unaltered until the rear-half of the structure was gutted-out in June 1991 to build the North Hobart Football Clubrooms which in years to come would become the headquarters for AFL Tasmania and the Southern Football League.

The Letitia Street Stand was also erected in 1924. This was built of wood and was in a poor state of disrepair by the time it was burned down in an arson attack in May 1987, it was later replaced by the $1.25 million Doug Plaister Stand that was completed in 1988. The concrete Roy Cazaly Stand, located in the forward pocket in front of the main entrance gate was constructed during 1960/1961.

Other works carried out were the building of players' tunnels at the foot of the Horrie Gorringe Stand and building the terraces (still in place today) during 1964/1965.

The main, electronic scoreboard, opened as the Gorringe Electronic Scoreboard, sponsored by the Donald Gorringe company in North Hobart, was constructed in 1972 and opened in time for the 1972 TANFL Finals Series. After being in a rundown and precarious condition for several years, its 538 light globes were removed and replaced by the Hobart City Council in May 2011, with a flat screen installed in place and new time clock installed. The upgraded scoreboard was opened for use on 21 May 2011 for a TSL match between North Hobart and Clarence. This has since been replaced by a jumbo screen scoreboard affixed to the front of the structure.

A new media centre named the Devine-Leedham Media Centre was constructed on centre-wing on the terraced side of the ground to replace the old television tower that had stood at the ground since the 1970s.

== Future ==
Despite North Hobart Oval's long-standing tradition as the 'Home Of Football' in the South of the State, the future of the venue is looking increasingly shaky as other stadiums gradually have surpassed the now tired looking stadium. In the 2009 TSL season, the ground was only scheduled to hold North Hobart's home matches and one finals match, but due to the poor standard of the playing surface the match was transferred to the now-preferred Bellerive Oval which marked the first TFL/TSL Season since 1921 that the ground went without hosting a finals match. The ground continued to host the Grand Final for the SFL and for the Old Scholars Football Association in 2009, but on 23 December 2009, it was announced by the SFL that they would be moving their operations and their Grand Final fixture to KGV Oval from 2010 and beyond.

North Hobart Oval has repeatedly been the subject of discussions over potential future redevelopment into a rectangular stadium in similar fashion to Perth Oval. However, the SFL has since backflipped and returned the Grand Final to NHO for the 2016 season. However, in recent times, the future of the ground has been assured somewhat with a 1.1 million combined state and federal government investment into the ground that will see improvements including a new kiosk and cool room, terraced and roofed standing area on the Rydges Hotel wing, an AFL compliant coaches and media box and a lift into the Plaister Stand to allow disabled access to the function room. In 2019, the ground will also host its first elite-level AFL event since the early 2000s when it hosts an AFL Women's match between North Melbourne Football Club vs Carlton Football Club on 3 February.

== Football attendance records ==
North Hobart Oval holds the top five ground attendance records in Tasmanian football history, including the highest roster match attendance ever recorded of 8,840 in 1967:

- 24,968 - Clarence v Glenorchy - 1979 TANFL Grand Final.
- 24,413 - New Norfolk v Clarence - 1970 TANFL Grand Final
- 23,764 - Tasmania v VFL - 1966 Australian National Football Carnival.
- 23,368 - Western Australia v VFL - 1966 Australian National Football Carnival.
- 20,775 - Sandy Bay v New Norfolk - 1964 TANFL Grand Final

== Rugby League attendance records ==
North Hobart Oval holds the top three attendance records in Tasmanian Rugby League History

- 11,752 Melbourne Storm V Brisbane Broncos - 2012 NRL Trials Match
- 6,823 Melbourne Storm V Canterbury-Bankstown Bulldogs - 2017 NRL Trials Match
- 3,000 Melbourne Storm V Adelaide Rams - 1998 NRL Trials Match

== Hosted events ==
- Australian Football League
- AFL Women's
- Victorian Football League
- VFL Women's
- 2026 VFL Finals series
- Southern Football League
- Tasmanian Football League
- Old Scholars Football Association
- Talent League Boy
- Talent League Girls
- The 1924, 1947, and 1966 Australian National Football Carnivals
- A-League Men
- A-League Women
- National Premier Leagues Tasmania
- Tasmanian Soccer Championship
- National Rugby League
- Affiliated States Championship
- Tasmanian Rugby League Grand Finals
- Super Rugby Pacific
- The 1924, 1936, 1951, 1959, 1960, 1965, 1967 and 1973 Australian Athletics Championships
- The 1987 Australian Masters Games
