= 1976 TANFL season =

Australian rules football season

- Teams: Clarence Kangaroos; Glenorchy Magpies; Hobart Tigers; New Norfolk Eagles; North Hobart Demons; Sandy Bay Seagulls
- Premiers: Sandy Bay
- Minor premiers: Sandy Bay; 6th minor premiership

Attendance
- Matches played: 55
- Total attendance: 128,233 (2,332 per match)

The 1976 Tasmanian Australian National Football League (TANFL) premiership season was an Australian rules football competition staged in Hobart, Tasmania over seventeen (17) roster rounds and four (4) finals series matches between 3 April and 11 September 1976.

== Participating Clubs ==
- Clarence District Football Club
- Glenorchy District Football Club
- Hobart Football Club
- New Norfolk District Football Club
- North Hobart Football Club
- Sandy Bay Football Club

=== 1976 TANFL Club Coaches ===
- Trevor Sorrell (Clarence)
- Peter Hudson (Glenorchy)
- David Harris (Hobart)
- Neil Ferguson (New Norfolk)
- Ross Price (North Hobart)
- Paul Sproule (Sandy Bay)

=== TANFL Reserves Grand Final ===
- New Norfolk 9.11 (65) v Sandy Bay 5.9 (39) – North Hobart Oval

=== TANFL Under-19's Grand Final ===
- Clarence 23.17 (155) v Glenorchy 8.15 (63) – North Hobart Oval

=== State Preliminary Final ===
(Saturday, 18 September 1976)

- Ulverstone: 4.2 (26) | 12.5 (77) | 15.8 (98) | 21.12 (138)
- Sandy Bay: 1.3 (9) | 4.6 (30) | 7.14 (56) | 9.15 (69)
- Attendance: 3,211 at Devonport Oval

=== State Grand Final ===
(Saturday, 25 September 1976)

- Ulverstone: 5.3 (33) | 8.10 (58) | 11.15 (81) | 17.19 (121)
- Launceston: 4.6 (30) | 6.10 (46) | 7.12 (54) | 10.14 (74)
- Attendance: 6,827 at York Park

=== Interstate Matches ===
Interstate Match (Saturday, 12 June 1976)

- Tasmania 21.19 (145) v Queensland 14.15 (99) – Att: 7,715 at North Hobart Oval

Interstate Match (Sunday, 11 July 1976)

- New South Wales 18.23 (131) v Tasmania 18.13 (121) – Att: N/A at Trumper Park, Sydney.

=== Intrastate Matches ===
Jubilee Shield – (Saturday, 15 May 1976)

- TANFL 18.16 (124) v NWFU 14.21 (105) – Att: 7,702 at North Hobart Oval

Jubilee Shield – (Saturday, 29 May 1976)

- TANFL 17.17 (119) v NTFA 13.14 (92) – Att: N/A at York Park

Inter-Association Match – (Sunday, 16 May 1976)

- Huon FA 12.13 (85) v TANFL II 8.19 (67) – Att: 1,350 at Huonville Recreation Ground.

=== Leading Goalkickers: TANFL ===
- Peter Hudson (Glenorchy) – 133
- Michael Elliot (Sandy Bay) – 74
- Trevor Sorrell (Clarence) – 47
- David Charlesworth (Hobart) – 40

=== Medal Winners ===
- Trevor Sorell (Clarence) – William Leitch Medal
- John Mundy (Sandy Bay) – George Watt Medal (Reserves)
- D.Sutton (New Norfolk) – V.A Geard Medal (Under-19's)
- Gary Linton (Glenorchy) – Weller Arnold Medal (Best TANFL player in Intrastate Matches)

== 1976 TANFL Ladder ==
Pos	Team	Pld	W	L	D	PF	PA	PP	Pts
1	Sandy Bay	17	15	2	0	1875	1270	147.6	60
2	Glenorchy	17	11	6	0	1847	1449	127.5	44
3	Clarence	17	9	8	0	1607	1629	98.6	36
4	Hobart	17	8	9	0	1789	1699	105.3	32
5	New Norfolk	17	6	11	0	1480	1767	83.8	24
6	North Hobart	17	2	15	0	1186	1970	60.2	8

=== Round 1 ===
(Saturday, 3 April 1976)

- Hobart 21.14 (140) v Nth Hobart 11.15 (81) – Att: 2,448 at North Hobart Oval
- Sandy Bay 15.20 (110) v Glenorchy 12.4 (76) – Att: 2,686 at KGV Football Park
- Clarence 17.21 (123) v New Norfolk 12.17 (89) – Att: 1,788 at Boyer Oval

=== Round 2 ===
(Saturday, 10 April 1976)

- New Norfolk 22.10 (142) v Hobart 15.20 (110) – Att: 2,047 at North Hobart Oval
- Sandy Bay 14.15 (99) v Clarence 4.12 (36) – Att: 2,270 at Queenborough Oval
- Glenorchy 10.15 (75) v Nth Hobart 7.13 (55) – Att: 2,380 at KGV Football Park

=== Round 3 ===
(Saturday, 17 April & Monday, 19 April 1976)

- Sandy Bay 13.13 (91) v Nth Hobart 5.11 (41) – Att: 2,148 at North Hobart Oval
- New Norfolk 17.16 (118) v Glenorchy 13.11 (89) – Att: 1,954 at Boyer Oval
- Hobart 20.15 (135) v Clarence 13.18 (96) – Att: 2,871 at North Hobart Oval (Monday)

=== Round 4 ===
(Saturday, 24 April 1976)

- Clarence 21.16 (142) v Nth Hobart 12.16 (88) – Att: 1,788 at North Hobart Oval
- Sandy Bay 16.17 (113) v New Norfolk 4.12 (36) – Att: 2,150 at Queenborough Oval
- Glenorchy 14.12 (96) v Hobart 12.18 (90) – Att: 2,067 at TCA Ground

=== Round 5 ===
(Saturday, 1 May 1976)

- Nth Hobart 15.19 (109) v New Norfolk 15.17 (107) – Att: 1,828 at North Hobart Oval
- Sandy Bay 17.14 (116) v Hobart 13.17 (95) – Att: 1,813 at TCA Ground
- Clarence 12.20 (92) v Glenorchy 9.15 (69) – Att: 2,786 at KGV Football Park

=== Round 6 ===
(Saturday, 8 May 1976)

- New Norfolk 17.20 (122) v Clarence 16.15 (111) – Att: 1,972 at North Hobart Oval
- Hobart 22.20 (152) v Nth Hobart 6.8 (44) – Att: 1,624 at TCA Ground
- Sandy Bay 15.14 (104) v Glenorchy 14.14 (98) – Att: 2,318 at Queenborough Oval

=== Round 7 ===
(Saturday, 22 May 1976)

- Glenorchy 26.15 (171) v Nth Hobart 9.8 (62) – Att: 2,472 at North Hobart Oval
- Clarence 16.16 (112) v Sandy Bay 15.21 (111) – Att: 2,368 at Bellerive Oval
- Hobart 20.10 (130) v New Norfolk 13.12 (90) – Att: 1,451 at Boyer Oval

=== Round 8 ===
(Saturday, 29 May 1976)

- New Norfolk 20.9 (129) v Glenorchy 14.9 (93) – Att: 1,556 at North Hobart Oval
- Clarence 15.13 (103) v Hobart 12.21 (93) – Att: 1,233 at TCA Ground
- Sandy Bay 12.20 (92) v Nth Hobart 12.7 (79) – Att: 1,061 at Queenborough Oval

=== Round 9 ===
(Saturday, 5 June 1976)

- Sandy Bay 14.23 (107) v New Norfolk 13.16 (94) – Att: 2,008 at North Hobart Oval
- Glenorchy 18.8 (116) v Hobart 16.12 (108) – Att: 2,077 at KGV Football Park
- Clarence 19.20 (134) v Nth Hobart 13.19 (97) – Att: 1,522 at Bellerive Oval

=== Round 10 ===
(Monday, 14 June 1976)

- Glenorchy 12.12 (84) v Clarence 11.10 (76) – Att: 3,063 at North Hobart Oval
- Sandy Bay 20.11 (131) v Hobart 12.17 (89) – Att: 1,606 at Queenborough Oval
- Nth Hobart 10.10 (70) v New Norfolk 8.14 (62) – Att: 1,287 at Boyer Oval

=== Round 11 ===
(Saturday, 19 June 1976)

- Hobart 15.20 (110) v Nth Hobart 12.13 (85) – Att: 1,629 at North Hobart Oval
- Sandy Bay 16.8 (104) v Glenorchy 12.17 (89) – Att: 2,920 at KGV Football Park
- Clarence 16.12 (108) v New Norfolk 11.14 (80) – Att: 1,675 at Bellerive Oval

=== Round 12 ===
(Saturday, 26 June & Saturday, 3 July 1976)

- Sandy Bay 11.21 (87) v Clarence 8.10 (58) – Att: 2,666 at North Hobart Oval (26 June)
- Hobart 13.23 (101) v New Norfolk 13.19 (97) – Att: 1,245 at TCA Ground (26 June)
- Glenorchy 20.16 (136) v Nth Hobart 10.15 (75) – Att: 2,411 at KGV Football Park (3 July)

=== Round 13 ===
(Saturday, 10 July 1976)

- Sandy Bay 24.16 (160) v Nth Hobart 10.16 (76) – Att: 1,497 at North Hobart Oval
- Glenorchy 19.18 (132) v New Norfolk 3.9 (27) – Att: 1,762 at KGV Football Park
- Hobart 12.20 (92) v Clarence 9.20 (74) – Att: 1,772 at Bellerive Oval

=== Round 14 ===
(Saturday, 17 July 1976)

- Glenorchy 19.18 (132) v Hobart 13.15 (93) – Att: 2,654 at North Hobart Oval
- Clarence 13.16 (94) v Nth Hobart 10.13 (73) – Att: 1,080 at Bellerive Oval
- Sandy Bay 13.14 (92) v New Norfolk 10.9 (69) – Att: 822 at Boyer Oval

=== Round 15 ===
(Saturday, 24 July 1976)

- New Norfolk 12.8 (80) v Nth Hobart 9.20 (74) – Att: 1,096 at North Hobart Oval
- Sandy Bay 22.15 (147) v Hobart 13.18 (96) – Att: 1,290 at TCA Ground
- Glenorchy 23.16 (154) v Clarence 11.17 (83) – Att: 2,336 at Bellerive Oval

=== Round 16 ===
(Saturday, 31 July 1976)

- Glenorchy 15.13 (103) v Sandy Bay 9.9 (63) – Att: 3,642 at North Hobart Oval
- Hobart 11.11 (77) v Nth Hobart 7.12 (54) – Att: 685 at TCA Ground
- New Norfolk 10.18 (78) v Clarence 10.10 (70) – Att: 635 at Boyer Oval

=== Round 17 ===
(Saturday, 14 August 1976)

- Clarence 13.17 (95) v Hobart 11.11 (77) – Att: 1,127 at North Hobart Oval
- Sandy Bay 20.22 (142) v Nth Hobart 3.5 (23) – Att: 923 at Queenborough Oval
- Glenorchy 20.15 (135) v New Norfolk 9.6 (60) – Att: 1,455 at Boyer Oval

Note: This round was postponed by one week on 7 August due to poor weather and ground conditions.

=== First Semi Final ===
(Saturday, 21 August 1976)

- Clarence: 6.4 (40) | 14.5 (89) | 22.9 (141) | 26.13 (169)
- Hobart: 8.3 (51) | 11.5 (71) | 16.8 (104) | 20.13 (133)
- Attendance: 4,614 at North Hobart Oval

=== Second Semi Final ===
(Saturday, 28 August 1976)

- Sandy Bay: 4.4 (28) | 12.9 (81) | 20.12 (132) | 24.15 (159)
- Glenorchy: 4.3 (27) | 7.6 (48) | 9.8 (62) | 15.12 (102)
- Attendance: 7,806 at North Hobart Oval

=== Preliminary Final ===
(Saturday, 4 September 1976)

- Glenorchy: 4.0 (24) | 6.6 (42) | 14.6 (90) | 18.9 (117)
- Clarence: 1.4 (10) | 6.6 (42) | 9.9 (63) | 12.13 (85)
- Attendance: 8,067 at North Hobart Oval

=== Grand Final ===
(Saturday, 11 September 1976)

- Sandy Bay: 2.1 (13) | 9.4 (58) | 15.5 (95) | 21.10 (136)
- Glenorchy: 3.3 (21) | 3.6 (24) | 4.8 (32) | 5.9 (39)
- Attendance: 10,881 at North Hobart Oval

Source: All scores and statistics courtesy of the Hobart Mercury and Saturday Evening Mercury (SEM) publications.
