= 1959 TANFL season =

Australian rules football season

- Teams: Clarence Kangaroos; Glenorchy Magpies; Hobart Tigers; New Norfolk Eagles; North Hobart Robins; Sandy Bay Seagulls
- Premiers: Hobart
- Minor premiers: Nth Hobart

Attendance
- Matches played: 58
- Total attendance: 212,436 (3,663 per match)

The 1959 Tasmanian Australian National Football League (TANFL) premiership season was an Australian Rules football competition staged in Hobart, Tasmania over eighteen (18) roster rounds and four (4) finals series matches between 28 March and 19 September 1959.

== Participating Clubs ==
- Clarence District Football Club
- Glenorchy District Football Club
- Hobart Football Club
- New Norfolk District Football Club
- North Hobart Football Club
- Sandy Bay Football Club

=== 1959 TANFL Club Coaches ===
- Stuart Spencer (Clarence)
- Jack Rough (Glenorchy)
- Mal Pascoe (Hobart)
- Noel Clarke (New Norfolk)
- John Leedham (North Hobart)
- Terry Cashion (Sandy Bay)

=== Leading Goalkickers: TANFL ===
- Mal Pascoe (Hobart) – 75
- D.Anning (Sandy Bay) – 54
- Paddy Cooper (North Hobart) – 52
- John Leedham (North Hobart) – 51
- Burnie Payne (Hobart) – 44

=== Medal Winners ===
- Mal Pascoe (Hobart) – William Leitch Medal
- S.Graham (North Hobart) – George Watt Medal (Reserves)
- Tony Browning (New Norfolk) – V.A Geard Medal (Under-19's)
- Mal Pascoe (Hobart) – Weller Arnold Medal (Best TANFL player in Intrastate match)

=== TANFL Reserves Grand Final ===
- Glenorchy 5.12 (42) v Sandy Bay 5.7 (37) – North Hobart Oval

=== TANFL Under-19's Grand Final ===
State Schools Old Boys Football Association (SSOBFA)

- Buckingham 12.18 (90) v Glenorchy 7.10 (52) – New Town Oval

=== State Preliminary Final ===
(Saturday, 19 September 1959)

- Burnie: 3.2 (20) | 5.7 (37) | 6.8 (44) | 7.13 (55)
- City: 1.2 (8) | 2.3 (15) | 4.3 (27) | 4.4 (28)
- Attendance: 4,687 at York Park

=== State Grand Final ===
(Saturday, 26 September 1959)

- Hobart: 4.1 (25) | 9.4 (58) | 12.6 (78) | 14.11 (95)
- Burnie: 3.4 (22) | 5.5 (35) | 8.12 (60) | 9.14 (68)
- Attendance: 13,223 at North Hobart Oval

Note: Hobart (TANFL guernseys) and Burnie (NWFU guernseys) wore alternate strips due to a guernsey clash.

=== Intrastate Matches ===
Jubilee Shield (Saturday, 9 May 1959)

- NWFU 15.12 (102) v TANFL 9.16 (70) – Att: 8,792 at West Park Oval

Jubilee Shield (Saturday, 6 June 1959)

- TANFL 12.15 (87) v NTFA 10.15 (75) – Att: 11,861 at North Hobart Oval

=== Interstate Matches ===
Interstate Match (Saturday, 20 June 1959)

- Victoria 17.17 (119) v Tasmania 9.10 (64) – Att: 13,000 at Devonport Oval

Interstate Match (Wednesday, 24 June 1959)

- Western Australia 25.15 (165) v Tasmania 13.16 (94) – Att: 11,740 at North Hobart Oval

== 1959 TANFL Ladder ==
Pos	Team	Pld	W	L	D	PF	PA	PP	Pts
1	North Hobart	18	15	3	0	1762	1449	121.6	60
2	Hobart	18	12	6	0	1694	1579	107.3	48
3	Sandy Bay	18	7	11	0	1527	1607	95.0	28
4	New Norfolk	18	7	11	0	1447	1639	88.3	28
5	Clarence	18	7	11	0	1336	1521	87.8	28
6	Glenorchy	18	6	12	0	1443	1524	94.7	24

=== Round 1 ===
(Saturday, 28 March. Monday, 30 March & Saturday, 4 April 1959)

- Clarence 13.14 (92) v New Norfolk 8.16 (64) – Att: 6,695 at North Hobart Oval (28 March)
- Glenorchy 12.11 (83) v Hobart 10.14 (74) – Att: 6,857 at North Hobart Oval (30 March)
- Nth Hobart 17.14 (116) v Sandy Bay 13.10 (88) – Att: 7,351 at North Hobart Oval (4 April)

=== Round 2 ===
(Saturday, 11 April 1959)

- Sandy Bay 24.15 (159) v Hobart 11.20 (86) – Att: 4,248 at North Hobart Oval
- Glenorchy 15.13 (103) v Clarence 9.20 (74) – Att: 3,551 at KGV Park
- New Norfolk 12.16 (88) v Nth Hobart 11.11 (77) – Att: 2,336 at Boyer Oval

=== Round 3 ===
(Saturday, 18 April 1959)

- Nth Hobart 21.16 (142) v Clarence 13.14 (92) – Att: 3,804 at North Hobart Oval
- Sandy Bay 12.14 (86) v Glenorchy 10.19 (79) – Att: 3,914 at Queenborough Oval
- Hobart 13.13 (91) v New Norfolk 12.12 (84) – Att: 2,328 at Boyer Oval

=== Round 4 ===
(Saturday, 2 May 1959)

- Nth Hobart 17.17 (119) v Glenorchy 12.12 (84) – Att: 5,231 at North Hobart Oval
- New Norfolk 15.11 (101) v Sandy Bay 13.15 (93) – Att: 2,355 at Queenborough Oval
- Hobart 14.10 (94) v Clarence 13.8 (86) – Att: 1,643 at Bellerive Oval

=== Round 5 ===
(Saturday, 9 May 1959)

- Nth Hobart 16.16 (112) v Hobart 7.10 (52) – Att: 3,221 at North Hobart Oval
- Glenorchy 17.16 (118) v New Norfolk 11.11 (77) – Att: 2,274 at KGV Park
- Sandy Bay 20.15 (135) v Clarence 10.11 (71) – Att: 1,412 at Bellerive Oval

=== Round 6 ===
(Saturday, 16 May 1959)

- Nth Hobart 16.13 (109) v Sandy Bay 11.15 (81) – Att: 4,612 at North Hobart Oval
- Glenorchy 17.16 (118) v Hobart 13.13 (91) – Att: 2,366 at KGV Park
- New Norfolk 17.16 (118) v Clarence 7.12 (54) – Att: 1,899 at Boyer Oval

=== Round 7 ===
(Saturday, 23 May 1959)

- Nth Hobart 10.20 (80) v New Norfolk 9.11 (65) – Att: 3,636 at North Hobart Oval
- Hobart 13.11 (89) v Sandy Bay 11.15 (81) – Att: 1,651 at Queenborough Oval
- Clarence 10.25 (85) v Glenorchy 7.6 (48) – Att: 1,350 at Bellerive Oval

=== Round 8 ===
(Saturday, 30 May 1959)

- Hobart 19.13 (127) v New Norfolk 16.9 (105) – Att: 3,758 at North Hobart Oval
- Sandy Bay 13.6 (84) v Glenorchy 10.9 (69) – Att: 3,154 at KGV Park
- Nth Hobart 8.11 (59) v Clarence 8.8 (56) – Att: 2,373 at Bellerive Oval

=== Round 9 ===
(Saturday, 13 June & Monday, 15 June 1959)

- Hobart 22.7 (139) v Clarence 4.9 (33) – Att: 2,313 at North Hobart Oval
- Sandy Bay 16.13 (109) v New Norfolk 9.8 (62) – Att: 1,555 at Boyer Oval
- Nth Hobart 11.12 (78) v Glenorchy 10.13 (73) – Att: 7,118 at North Hobart Oval (Monday)

=== Round 10 ===
(Saturday, 20 June & Saturday, 27 June 1959)

- New Norfolk 13.12 (90) v Glenorchy 10.23 (83) – Att: 4,098 at North Hobart Oval (20 June)
- Nth Hobart 13.14 (92) v Hobart 11.22 (88) – Att: 4,855 at North Hobart Oval (27 June)
- Clarence 10.10 (70) v Sandy Bay 7.9 (51) – Att: 1,924 at Queenborough Oval (27 June)

=== Round 11 ===
(Saturday, 4 July 1959)

- Hobart 17.14 (116) v Glenorchy 10.7 (67) – Att: 3,857 at North Hobart Oval
- Nth Hobart 13.12 (90) v Sandy Bay 8.8 (56) – Att: 2,014 at Queenborough Oval
- Clarence 9.14 (68) v New Norfolk 5.9 (39) – Att: 2,356 at Bellerive Oval

=== Round 12 ===
(Saturday, 11 July 1959)

- Hobart 17.14 (116) v Sandy Bay 9.21 (75) – Att: 3,647 at North Hobart Oval
- Glenorchy 9.13 (67) v Clarence 6.16 (52) – Att: 3,247 at KGV Park
- Nth Hobart 16.11 (107) v New Norfolk 13.5 (83) – Att: 1,871 at Boyer Oval

=== Round 13 ===
(Saturday, 18 July 1959)

- Nth Hobart 15.11 (101) v Clarence 14.13 (97) – Att: 3,238 at North Hobart Oval
- Sandy Bay 10.10 (70) v Glenorchy 8.11 (59) – Att: 3,008 at Queenborough Oval
- Hobart 15.17 (107) v New Norfolk 7.8 (50) – Att: 1,805 at Boyer Oval

=== Round 14 ===
(Saturday, 25 July 1959)

- Hobart 16.19 (115) v Clarence 8.11 (59) – Att: 3,292 at North Hobart Oval
- New Norfolk 15.8 (98) v Sandy Bay 7.9 (51) – Att: 1,807 at Queenborough Oval
- Nth Hobart 14.8 (92) v Glenorchy 12.12 (84) – Att: 3,170 at KGV Park

=== Round 15 ===
(Saturday, 1 August 1959)

- Nth Hobart 19.15 (129) v Hobart 11.12 (78) – Att: 6,172 at North Hobart Oval
- Clarence 10.14 (74) v Sandy Bay 9.16 (70) – Att: 1,956 at Bellerive Oval
- New Norfolk 11.14 (80) v Glenorchy 10.14 (74) – Att: 2,736 at Boyer Oval

=== Round 16 ===
(Saturday, 8 August 1959)

- Sandy Bay 13.12 (90) v Nth Hobart 10.16 (76) – Att: 3,439 at North Hobart Oval
- Hobart 14.15 (99) v Glenorchy 12.14 (86) – Att: 3,049 at KGV Park
- New Norfolk 12.10 (82) v Clarence 10.9 (69) – Att: 2,525 at Boyer Oval

=== Round 17 ===
(Saturday, 15 August 1959)

- Nth Hobart 17.18 (120) v New Norfolk 10.15 (75) – Att: 3,172 at North Hobart Oval
- Hobart 17.22 (124) v Sandy Bay 11.7 (73) – Att: 1,917 at Queenborough Oval
- Clarence 11.16 (82) v Glenorchy 4.7 (31) – Att: 1,755 at Bellerive Oval

=== Round 18 ===
(Saturday, 22 August 1959)

- Hobart 14.24 (108) v New Norfolk 13.9 (87) – Att: 3,212 at North Hobart Oval
- Glenorchy 17.16 (118) v Sandy Bay 11.9 (75) – Att: 1,800 at KGV Park
- Clarence 18.13 (121) v Nth Hobart 9.9 (63) – Att: 2,421 at Bellerive Oval

=== First Semi Final ===
(Saturday, 29 August 1959)

- New Norfolk: 5.4 (34) | 8.6 (54) | 10.13 (73) | 12.15 (87)
- Sandy Bay: 2.5 (17) | 5.8 (38) | 7.9 (51) | 9.10 (64)
- Attendance: 9,264 at North Hobart Oval

=== Second Semi Final ===
(Saturday, 5 September 1959)

- Hobart: 7.4 (46) | 11.5 (71) | 15.8 (98) | 17.10 (112)
- Nth Hobart: 4.4 (28) | 6.6 (42) | 8.8 (56) | 8.12 (60)
- Attendance: 10,608 at North Hobart Oval

=== Preliminary Final ===
(Saturday, 12 September 1959)

- New Norfolk: 0.5 (5) | 4.7 (31) | 8.11 (59) | 11.12 (78)
- Nth Hobart: 5.3 (33) | 9.4 (58) | 11.6 (72) | 11.8 (74)
- Attendance: 11,119 at North Hobart Oval

=== Grand Final ===
(Saturday, 19 September 1959)

- Hobart: 4.6 (30) | 6.11 (47) | 8.14 (62) | 9.14 (68)
- New Norfolk: 0.0 (0) | 1.5 (11) | 2.5 (17) | 2.9 (21)
- Attendance: 10,103 at North Hobart Oval

Source: All scores and statistics courtesy of the Hobart Mercury and Saturday Evening Mercury (SEM) publications.
