= 1958 TANFL season =

Australian rules football season

- Teams: Clarence Kangaroos; Glenorchy Magpies; Hobart Tigers; New Norfolk Eagles; North Hobart Robins; Sandy Bay Seagulls
- Premiers: Glenorchy
- Minor premiers: New Norfolk; 1st minor premiership

Attendance
- Matches played: 55
- Total attendance: 207,127 (3,766 per match)

The 1958 Tasmanian Australian National Football League (TANFL) premiership season was an Australian Rules football competition staged in Hobart, Tasmania over eighteen (17) roster rounds and four (4) finals series matches between 5 April and 13 September 1958.

The eighteenth roster round scheduled for 16 August was postponed due to inclement weather conditions and was abandoned altogether two days later.

== Participating Clubs ==
- Clarence District Football Club
- Glenorchy District Football Club
- Hobart Football Club
- New Norfolk District Football Club
- North Hobart Football Club
- Sandy Bay Football Club

=== 1958 TANFL Club Coaches ===
- Stuart Spencer (Clarence)
- Jack Rough (Glenorchy)
- Bill Williams (Hobart)
- Noel Clarke (New Norfolk)
- John Leedham (North Hobart)
- Gordon Bowman (Sandy Bay)

=== TANFL Reserves Grand Final ===
- Glenorchy 17.15 (117) v Clarence 11.9 (75) – North Hobart Oval

=== TANFL Under-19's Grand Final ===
State Schools Old Boys Football Association (SSOBFA)

- Buckingham 9.14 (68) v Clarence 5.7 (37) – New Town Oval

=== State Preliminary Final ===
(Saturday, 20 September 1958)

- Glenorchy: 3.4 (22) | 6.6 (42) | 9.9 (63) | 15.12 (102)
- Longford: 6.5 (41) | 8.8 (56) | 10.10 (70) | 11.10 (76)
- Attendance: 8,150 at North Hobart Oval

=== State Grand Final ===
(Saturday, 27 September 1958)

- Glenorchy: 1.7 (13) | 3.7 (25) | 5.11 (41) | 7.11 (53)
- Burnie: 1.1 (7) | 4.7 (31) | 4.10 (34) | 6.11 (47)
- Attendance: 8,873 at Devonport Oval

=== Intrastate Matches ===
Jubilee Shield (Saturday, 10 May 1958)

- TANFL 19.9 (123) v NTFA 15.15 (105) – Att: 5,776 at York Park

Jubilee Shield (Saturday, 14 June 1958)

- TANFL 13.19 (97) v NWFU 8.17 (65) – Att: 9,280 at North Hobart Oval

=== Interstate Matches ===
See: 1958 Australian National Football Carnival

Match One (Tuesday, 3 July 1958)

- Victoria FA 15.12 (102) v Tasmania 13.16 (94) – Att: N/A at Lake Oval

Match Four (Thursday, 5 July 1958)

- Tasmania 13.16 (94) v Western Australia 11.12 (78) – Att: 3,000 at Lake Oval

Match Six (Saturday, 7 July 1958)

- Tasmania 11.18 (84) v South Australia 11.16 (82) – Att: 2,670 at Melbourne Cricket Ground

Match Eight (Monday, 9 July 1958)

- Victoria 25.14 (164) v Tasmania 8.14 (62) – Att: 3,500 at Lake Oval

=== Leading Goalkickers: TANFL ===
- Paddy Cooper (North Hobart) – 45
- Max Howard (Sandy Bay) – 36
- Bert Blenkinsopp (Hobart) – 32
- Ian Westell (Sandy Bay) – 32
- W.Pepper (Hobart) – 30
- A.Walch (New Norfolk) – 30

=== Medal Winners ===
- Rex Garwood (New Norfolk) – William Leitch Medal
- Bob Large (North Hobart) – George Watt Medal (Reserves)
- Colin Glover (Buckingham) – V.A Geard Medal (Under-19's)
- Stuart Spencer (Clarence) – Weller Arnold Medal (Best TANFL player in Intrastate match)

== 1958 TANFL Ladder ==
Pos	Team	Pld	W	L	D	PF	PA	PP	Pts
1	New Norfolk	17	14	3	0	1426	1169	122.0	56
2	Glenorchy	17	12	5	0	1525	1172	130.1	48
3	North Hobart	17	9	8	0	1529	1450	105.4	36
4	Sandy Bay	17	8	9	0	1369	1493	91.7	32
5	Hobart	17	6	10	1	1314	1333	98.6	26
6	Clarence	17	1	15	1	1098	1534	71.6	6

=== Round 1 ===
(Saturday, 5 April. Monday, 7 April & Saturday, 12 April 1958)

- Nth Hobart 14.15 (99) v Glenorchy 14.13 (97) – Att: 7,238 at North Hobart Oval (5 April)
- New Norfolk 8.14 (62) v Hobart 8.10 (58) – Att: 5,742 at North Hobart Oval (7 April)
- Sandy Bay 17.20 (122) v Clarence 10.16 (76) – Att: 7,412 at North Hobart Oval (12 April)

=== Round 2 ===
(Saturday, 19 April 1958)

- New Norfolk 14.13 (97) v Nth Hobart 14.11 (95) – Att: 4,681 at North Hobart Oval
- Sandy Bay 16.9 (105) v Glenorchy 14.14 (98) – Att: 2,756 at KGV Park
- Hobart 9.16 (70) v Clarence 6.12 (48) – Att: 1,612 at Bellerive Oval

=== Round 3 ===
(Saturday, 26 April 1958)

- Nth Hobart 22.14 (146) v Clarence 12.8 (80) – Att: 3,314 at North Hobart Oval
- Hobart 15.24 (114) v Sandy Bay 8.7 (55) – Att: 3,167 at Queenborough Oval
- New Norfolk 16.6 (102) v Glenorchy 13.16 (94) – Att: 4,059 at Boyer Oval

=== Round 4 ===
(Saturday, 3 May 1958)

- Nth Hobart 8.17 (65) v Hobart 5.6 (36) – Att: 2,192 at North Hobart Oval
- Glenorchy 15.20 (110) v Clarence 0.7 (7) – Att: 792 at KGV Park
- New Norfolk 8.12 (60) v Sandy Bay 5.6 (36) – Att: 1,140 at Boyer Oval

=== Round 5 ===
(Saturday, 10 May & Saturday, 17 May 1958)

- Nth Hobart 23.17 (155) v Sandy Bay 15.12 (102) – Att: 4,280 at North Hobart Oval (10 May)
- Glenorchy 15.10 (100) v Hobart 11.17 (83) – Att: 5,832 at North Hobart Oval (17 May)
- New Norfolk 15.16 (106) v Clarence 6.10 (46) – Att: 2,341 at Bellerive Oval (17 May)

=== Round 6 ===
(Saturday, 24 May 1958)

- Glenorchy 8.11 (59) v Nth Hobart 6.7 (43) – Att: 4,589 at North Hobart Oval
- Clarence 11.8 (74) v Sandy Bay 4.12 (36) – Att: 1,240 at Queenborough Oval
- New Norfolk 6.16 (52) v Hobart 4.12 (36) – Att: 1,969 at Boyer Oval

=== Round 7 ===
(Saturday, 31 May 1958)

- Hobart 6.19 (55) v Clarence 7.13 (55) – Att: 2,660 at North Hobart Oval
- Sandy Bay 8.19 (67) v Glenorchy 9.8 (62) – Att: 2,619 at Queenborough Oval
- Nth Hobart 13.8 (86) v New Norfolk 10.10 (70) – Att: 3,778 at Boyer Oval

=== Round 8 ===
(Saturday, 7 June 1958)

- Sandy Bay 18.10 (118) v Hobart 9.16 (70) – Att: 3,530 at North Hobart Oval
- Glenorchy 15.12 (102) v New Norfolk 12.11 (83) – Att: 4,373 at KGV Park
- Nth Hobart 13.15 (93) v Clarence 10.15 (75) – Att: 2,472 at Bellerive Oval

=== Round 9 ===
(Monday, 16 June 1958)

- Nth Hobart 14.10 (94) v Hobart 9.11 (65) – Att: 3,109 at North Hobart Oval
- New Norfolk 12.12 (84) v Sandy Bay 10.8 (68) – Att: 2,489 at Queenborough Oval
- Glenorchy 17.13 (115) v Clarence 12.12 (84) – Att: 1,716 at Bellerive Oval

=== Round 10 ===
(Saturday, 21 June 1958)

- Sandy Bay 13.14 (92) v Nth Hobart 10.18 (78) – Att: 4,445 at North Hobart Oval
- Glenorchy 12.10 (82) v Hobart 9.13 (67) – Att: 2,886 at KGV Park
- New Norfolk 6.9 (45) v Clarence 4.14 (38) – Att: 2,293 at Boyer Oval

=== Round 11 ===
(Saturday, 28 June 1958)

- Hobart 15.8 (98) v New Norfolk 11.18 (84) – Att: 3,423 at North Hobart Oval
- Glenorchy 13.10 (88) v Nth Hobart 6.8 (44) – Att: 3,724 at KGV Park
- Sandy Bay 18.18 (126) v Clarence 7.11 (53) – Att: 1,501 at Bellerive Oval

=== Round 12 ===
(Saturday, 5 July 1958)

- New Norfolk 13.14 (92) v Nth Hobart 13.13 (91) – Att: 3,826 at North Hobart Oval
- Glenorchy 10.18 (78) v Sandy Bay 6.14 (50) – Att: 3,097 at KGV Park
- Hobart 16.9 (105) v Clarence 11.14 (80) – Att: 1,114 at Bellerive Oval

=== Round 13 ===
(Saturday, 12 July 1958)

- Nth Hobart 15.26 (116) v Clarence 15.7 (97) – Att: 2,541 at North Hobart Oval
- Sandy Bay 15.9 (99) v Hobart 14.14 (98) – Att: 2,313 at Queenborough Oval
- New Norfolk 13.10 (88) v Glenorchy 6.11 (47) – Att: 2,979 at Boyer Oval

=== Round 14 ===
(Saturday, 19 July 1958)

- Hobart 14.6 (90) v Nth Hobart 9.23 (77) – Att: 4,074 at North Hobart Oval
- Glenorchy 12.20 (92) v Clarence 3.7 (25) – Att: 2,263 at KGV Park
- New Norfolk 20.13 (133) v Sandy Bay 10.7 (67) – Att: 2,241 at Boyer Oval

=== Round 15 ===
(Saturday, 26 July 1958)

- Glenorchy 12.13 (85) v Hobart 10.16 (76) – Att: 4,614 at North Hobart Oval
- Nth Hobart 15.19 (109) v Sandy Bay 10.5 (65) – Att: 1,766 at Queenborough Oval
- New Norfolk 17.10 (112) v Clarence 13.11 (89) – Att: 1,643 at Bellerive Oval

=== Round 16 ===
(Saturday, 2 August 1958)

- Glenorchy 20.16 (136) v Nth Hobart 12.9 (81) – Att: 5,929 at North Hobart Oval
- Sandy Bay 12.11 (83) v Clarence 11.15 (81) – Att: 1,372 at Queenborough Oval
- New Norfolk 13.8 (86) v Hobart 9.8 (62) – Att: 2,121 at Boyer Oval

=== Round 17 ===
(Saturday, 9 August 1958)

- Hobart 15.12 (102) v Clarence 12.18 (90) – Att: 1,875 at North Hobart Oval
- Glenorchy 12.8 (80) v Sandy Bay 12.6 (78) – Att: 2,034 at Queenborough Oval
- New Norfolk 11.14 (80) v Nth Hobart 8.8 (56) – Att: 2,271 at Boyer Oval

=== Round 18 ===
(Saturday, 16 August 1958)

- Hobart v Sandy Bay – at North Hobart Oval (Cancelled)
- Glenorchy v New Norfolk – at KGV Park (Cancelled)
- Clarence v Nth Hobart – at Bellerive Oval (Cancelled)

Note: This round was abandoned due to inclement weather conditions.

=== First Semi Final ===
(Saturday, 23 August 1958)

- Sandy Bay: 4.1 (25) | 6.2 (38) | 10.8 (68) | 15.9 (99)
- Nth Hobart: 4.5 (29) | 8.8 (56) | 10.9 (69) | 14.13 (97)
- Attendance: 9,043 at North Hobart Oval

=== Second Semi Final ===
(Saturday, 30 August 1958)

- Glenorchy: 3.4 (22) | 8.8 (56) | 12.14 (86) | 13.14 (92)
- New Norfolk: 3.1 (19) | 3.6 (24) | 5.10 (40) | 10.11 (71)
- Attendance: 13,176 at North Hobart Oval

=== Preliminary Final ===
(Saturday, 6 September 1958)

- Sandy Bay: 0.6 (6) | 4.13 (37) | 10.14 (74) | 13.18 (96)
- New Norfolk: 3.0 (18) | 4.4 (28) | 5.10 (40) | 8.12 (60)
- Attendance: 11,818 at North Hobart Oval

=== Grand Final ===
(Saturday, 13 September 1958)

- Glenorchy: 1.3 (9) | 6.6 (42) | 9.11 (65) | 15.15 (105)
- Sandy Bay: 1.3 (9) | 4.4 (28) | 9.8 (62) | 11.11 (77)
- Attendance: 15,643 at North Hobart Oval

Source: All scores and statistics courtesy of the Hobart Mercury and Saturday Evening Mercury (SEM) publications.
