= 1961 TANFL season =

Australian rules football season

- Teams: Clarence Kangaroos; Glenorchy Magpies; Hobart Tigers; New Norfolk Eagles; North Hobart Robins; Sandy Bay Seagulls
- Premiers: Nth Hobart
- Minor premiers: Nth Hobart

Attendance
- Matches played: 64
- Total attendance: 216,408 (3,381 per match)

The 1961 Tasmanian Australian National Football League (TANFL) premiership season was an Australian Rules football competition staged in Hobart, Tasmania over twenty (20) roster rounds and four (4) finals series matches between 1 April and 16 September 1961.

== Participating clubs ==
- Clarence District Football Club
- Glenorchy District Football Club
- Hobart Football Club
- New Norfolk District Football Club
- North Hobart Football Club
- Sandy Bay Football Club

=== 1961 TANFL Club Coaches ===
- Stuart Spencer & Geoff Frier (Stand-In) (Clarence)
- John Chick (Glenorchy)
- Mal Pascoe (Hobart)
- Athol Webb (New Norfolk)
- Peter Marquis (North Hobart)
- Stan Booth (Sandy Bay)

=== TANFL Reserves Grand Final ===
- Glenorchy 11.17 (83) v Clarence 7.12 (54) – North Hobart Oval

=== TANFL Under-19's Grand Final ===
State Schools Old Boys Football Association (SSOBFA)

- Lindisfarne 9.18 (72) v Glenorchy 8.2 (50) – New Town Oval

=== State Preliminary Final ===
(Saturday, 23 September 1961)

- Nth Hobart 15.22 (112) v Nth Launceston 13.8 (86) – Att: 9,053 at North Hobart Oval

=== State Grand Final ===
(Saturday, 30 September 1961)

- Nth Hobart: 1.0 (6) | 8.4 (52) | 9.4 (58) | 13.8 (86)
- Cooee: 2.1 (13) | 2.4 (16) | 5.9 (39) | 8.10 (58)
- Attendance: 8,000 at West Park Oval

=== Intrastate Matches ===
Jubilee Shield (Saturday, 6 May 1961)

- TANFL 13.13 (91) v NWFU 6.23 (59) – Att: 8,500 at West Park Oval

Jubilee Shield (Saturday, 24 June 1961)

- TANFL 8.19 (67) v NTFA 8.8 (56) – Att: 9,378 at North Hobart Oval

=== Interstate Matches ===
See: 1961 Australian National Football Carnival

Match One (Sunday, 16 July 1961)

- Western Australia 24.33 (177) v Tasmania 10.6 (66) – Att: 7,192 at the Gabba, Brisbane

Match Three (Wednesday, 19 July 1961)

- Victoria 20.30 (150) v Tasmania 12.17 (89) – Att: 4,500 at the Gabba, Brisbane

Match Five (Saturday, 22 July 1961)

- South Australia 15.17 (107) v Tasmania 14.16 (100) – Att: 2,500 at the Gabba, Brisbane

Interstate Match (Monday, 12 June 1961)

- Tasmania 17.12 (114) v VFA 11.25 (91) – Att: 14,017 at North Hobart Oval

=== Leading Goalkickers: TANFL ===
- Noel Clarke (Nth Hobart) – 74

=== Medal Winners ===
- Roger Browning (New Norfolk) – William Leitch Medal
- Barry Beckett (Sandy Bay) – George Watt Medal (Reserves)
- Ian Stewart (Macalburn) – V.A Geard Medal (Under-19's)
- John Noble (Nth Hobart) – Lefroy Medal (Best player in Interstate matches)
- Peter Marquis (Nth Hobart) & Dale Flint (Sandy Bay) – Weller Arnold Medal (Best player/s in Intrastate matches)

== 1961 TANFL Ladder ==
Pos	Team	Pld	W	L	D	PF	PA	PP	Pts
1	North Hobart	20	13	7	0	1550	1220	127.0	52
2	Glenorchy	20	12	8	0	1439	1296	111.0	48
3	Clarence	20	11	9	0	1362	1353	100.7	44
4	Sandy Bay	20	10	9	1	1471	1200	122.6	42
5	Hobart	20	9	11	0	1503	1645	91.4	36
6	New Norfolk	20	4	15	1	1107	1610	68.8	18

=== Round 1 ===
(Saturday, 1 April & Monday, 3 April 1961)

- Hobart 13.16 (94) v Nth Hobart 12.13 (85) – Att: 5,522 at North Hobart Oval
- Clarence 13.9 (87) v New Norfolk 8.13 (61) – Att: 3,073 at Boyer Oval
- Sandy Bay 10.20 (80) v Glenorchy 5.11 (41) – Att: 5,900 at North Hobart Oval (Monday)

=== Round 2 ===
(Saturday, 8 April 1961)

- Glenorchy 11.14 (80) v Nth Hobart 10.11 (71) – Att: 3,808 at North Hobart Oval
- Sandy Bay 7.7 (49) v New Norfolk 7.7 (49) – Att: 2,095 at Queenborough Oval
- Hobart 14.12 (96) v Clarence 9.18 (72) – Att: 2,937 at Bellerive Oval

=== Round 3 ===
(Saturday, 15 April 1961)

- New Norfolk 9.7 (61) v Glenorchy 8.10 (58) – Att: 4,002 at North Hobart Oval
- Hobart 14.15 (99) v Sandy Bay 13.20 (98) – Att: 2,816 at Queenborough Oval
- Clarence 13.16 (94) v Nth Hobart 8.17 (65) – Att: 2,782 at Bellerive Oval

=== Round 4 ===
(Saturday, 22 April 1961)

- New Norfolk 8.8 (56) v Nth Hobart 6.9 (45) – Att: 3,772 at North Hobart Oval
- Clarence 8.14 (62) v Sandy Bay 5.13 (43) – Att: 2,871 at Bellerive Oval
- Glenorchy 9.15 (69) v Hobart 8.14 (62) – Att: 3,347 at KGV Park

=== Round 5 ===
(Saturday, 29 April 1961)

- Nth Hobart 11.13 (79) v Sandy Bay 10.14 (74) – Att: 3,775 at North Hobart Oval
- New Norfolk 14.14 (98) v Hobart 15.5 (95) – Att: 2,661 at Boyer Oval
- Clarence 10.12 (72) v Glenorchy 9.10 (64) – Att: 4,309 at Bellerive Oval

=== Round 6 ===
(Saturday, 6 May 1961)

- Clarence 13.7 (85) v New Norfolk 9.14 (68) – Att: 3,868 at North Hobart Oval
- Nth Hobart 19.16 (130) v Hobart 8.11 (59) – Att: 2,117 at TCA Ground
- Glenorchy 14.13 (97) v Sandy Bay 13.10 (88) – Att: 2,087 at Queenborough Oval

=== Round 7 ===
(Saturday, 13 May 1961)

- Sandy Bay 18.9 (117) v New Norfolk 12.13 (85) – Att: 3,061 at North Hobart Oval
- Hobart 12.8 (80) v Clarence 9.15 (69) – Att: 3,591 at TCA Ground
- Glenorchy 13.8 (86) v Nth Hobart 10.11 (71) – Att: 3,622 at KGV Park

=== Round 8 ===
(Saturday, 20 May 1961)

- Clarence 9.13 (67) v Nth Hobart 7.7 (49) – Att: 4,180 at North Hobart Oval
- Glenorchy 15.19 (109) v New Norfolk 7.11 (53) – Att: 3,318 at KGV Park
- Sandy Bay 13.10 (88) v Hobart 10.13 (73) – Att: 2,629 at TCA Ground

=== Round 9 ===
(Saturday, 27 May 1961)

- Glenorchy 14.16 (100) v Hobart 8.20 (68) – Att: 4,809 at North Hobart Oval
- Sandy Bay 10.8 (68) v Clarence 8.15 (63) – Att: 3,715 at Queenborough Oval
- Nth Hobart 9.17 (71) v New Norfolk 4.8 (32) – Att: 2,037 at Boyer Oval

=== Round 10 ===
(Saturday, 3 June 1961)

- Hobart 19.11 (125) v New Norfolk 10.6 (66) – Att: 2,227 at North Hobart Oval
- Nth Hobart 7.10 (52) v Sandy Bay 6.14 (50) – Att: 2,304 at Queenborough Oval
- Glenorchy 12.8 (80) v Clarence 11.10 (76) – Att: 4,008 at Bellerive Oval

=== Round 11 ===
(Saturday, 10 June 1961)

- Nth Hobart 18.6 (114) v Hobart 9.12 (66) – Att: 3,535 at North Hobart Oval
- Glenorchy 9.17 (71) v Sandy Bay 9.11 (65) – Att: 3,563 at KGV Park
- Clarence 7.6 (48) v New Norfolk 6.7 (43) – Att: 1,768 at Boyer Oval

=== Round 12 ===
(Saturday, 17 June 1961)

- Nth Hobart 13.8 (86) v Glenorchy 7.7 (49) – Att: 2,397 at North Hobart Oval
- Hobart 8.11 (59) v Clarence 6.7 (43) – Att: 1,556 at TCA Ground
- Sandy Bay 11.9 (75) v New Norfolk 6.10 (46) – Att: 867 at Queenborough Oval

=== Round 13 ===
(Saturday, 1 July 1961)

- Sandy Bay 10.12 (72) v Hobart 7.12 (54) – Att: 2,852 at North Hobart Oval
- New Norfolk 9.8 (62) v Glenorchy 7.13 (55) – Att: 1,595 at Boyer Oval
- Nth Hobart 6.14 (50) v Clarence 5.8 (38) – Att: 2,512 at Bellerive Oval

=== Round 14 ===
(Saturday, 8 July 1961)

- Nth Hobart 13.20 (98) v New Norfolk 6.1 (37) – Att: 1,810 at North Hobart Oval
- Sandy Bay 11.11 (77) v Clarence 8.7 (55) – Att: 1,604 at Bellerive Oval
- Glenorchy 9.11 (65) v Hobart 6.9 (45) – Att: 1,335 at KGV Park

=== Round 15 ===
(Saturday, 15 July 1961)

- Clarence 6.21 (57) v Glenorchy 6.5 (41) – Att: 2,790 at North Hobart Oval
- Sandy Bay 11.5 (71) v Nth Hobart 8.9 (57) – Att: 2,121 at Queenborough Oval
- Hobart 6.16 (52) v New Norfolk 4.7 (31) – Att: 1,190 at TCA Ground

=== Round 16 ===
(Saturday, 22 July 1961)

- Glenorchy 6.9 (45) v Sandy Bay 4.12 (36) – Att: 4,227 at North Hobart Oval
- Nth Hobart 11.8 (74) v Hobart 4.15 (39) – Att: 1,973 at TCA Ground
- Clarence 16.15 (111) v New Norfolk 11.15 (81) – Att: 1,953 at Bellerive Oval

=== Round 17 ===
(Saturday, 29 July 1961)

- Clarence 13.15 (93) v Hobart 10.11 (71) – Att: 3,223 at North Hobart Oval
- Nth Hobart 7.15 (57) v Glenorchy 6.13 (49) – Att: 3,087 at KGV Park
- Sandy Bay 7.15 (57) v New Norfolk 2.4 (16) – Att: 1,230 at Boyer Oval

=== Round 18 ===
(Saturday, 5 August 1961)

- Nth Hobart 14.15 (99) v Clarence 4.11 (35) – Att: 6,552 at North Hobart Oval
- Hobart 12.16 (88) v Sandy Bay 12.13 (85) – Att: 1,913 at Queenborough Oval
- Glenorchy 14.14 (98) v New Norfolk 4.5 (29) – Att: 1,702 at KGV Park

=== Round 19 ===
(Saturday, 12 August 1961)

- Sandy Bay 12.21 (93) v Clarence 10.8 (68) – Att: 3,929 at North Hobart Oval
- Glenorchy 17.16 (118) v Hobart 12.18 (90) – Att: 2,928 at TCA Ground
- Nth Hobart 12.17 (89) v New Norfolk 7.16 (58) – Att: 999 at Boyer Oval

=== Round 20 ===
(Saturday, 19 August 1961)

- Nth Hobart 16.14 (110) v Sandy Bay 11.19 (85) – Att: 3,501 at North Hobart Oval
- Clarence 10.7 (67) v Glenorchy 9.11 (65) – Att: 2,287 at Bellerive Oval
- Hobart 13.8 (86) v New Norfolk 10.16 (76) – Att: 929 at Boyer Oval

=== First Semi Final ===
(Saturday, 26 August 1961)

- Sandy Bay: 2.3 (15) | 5.5 (35) | 6.8 (44) | 11.11 (77)
- Clarence: 2.2 (14) | 7.4 (46) | 8.9 (57) | 8.10 (58)
- Attendance: 8,859 at North Hobart Oval

=== Second Semi Final ===
(Saturday, 2 September 1961)

- Nth Hobart: 3.3 (21) | 5.7 (37) | 9.9 (63) | 11.10 (76)
- Glenorchy: 2.1 (13) | 4.2 (26) | 5.2 (32) | 10.6 (66)
- Attendance: 8,922 at North Hobart Oval

=== Preliminary Final ===
(Saturday, 9 September 1961)

- Glenorchy: 3.3 (21) | 6.6 (42) | 9.10 (64) | 13.13 (91)
- Sandy Bay: 1.2 (8) | 8.4 (52) | 8.6 (54) | 9.8 (62)
- Attendance: 10,265 at North Hobart Oval

=== Grand Final ===
(Saturday, 16 September 1961)

- Nth Hobart: 5.4 (34) | 9.6 (60) | 13.9 (87) | 16.12 (108)
- Glenorchy: 2.1 (13) | 5.3 (33) | 6.5 (41) | 11.6 (72)
- Attendance: 15,217 at North Hobart Oval

Source: All scores and statistics courtesy of the Hobart Mercury and Saturday Evening Mercury (SEM) publications.
