= 1974 TANFL season =

Australian rules football season

- Teams: Clarence Kangaroos; Glenorchy Magpies; Hobart Tigers; New Norfolk Eagles; North Hobart Demons; Sandy Bay Seagulls
- Premiers: North Hobart
- Minor premiers: Glenorchy

Attendance
- Matches played: 67
- Total attendance: 210,142 (3,136 per match)

The 1974 Tasmanian Australian National Football League (TANFL) premiership season was an Australian rules football competition staged in Hobart, Tasmania over twenty-one (21) roster rounds and four (4) finals series matches between 6 April and 5 October 1974.

== Participating Clubs ==
- Clarence District Football Club
- Glenorchy District Football Club
- Hobart Football Club
- New Norfolk District Football Club
- North Hobart Football Club
- Sandy Bay Football Club

=== 1974 TANFL Club Coaches ===
- Robin Norris (Clarence)
- Trevor Sprigg (Glenorchy)
- Trevor Leo (Hobart)
- Geoff Hill (New Norfolk)
- John Devine (North Hobart)
- Rod Olsson (Sandy Bay)

=== TANFL Reserves Grand Final ===
- Nth Hobart 17.6 (108) v Glenorchy 13.13 (91) – North Hobart Oval

=== TANFL Under-19's Grand Final ===
(Saturday, 12 October 1974)

- Glenorchy 11.7 (73) v Clarence 5.9 (39) – Boyer Oval

=== Intrastate Match ===
Inter-Association Match (Saturday, 8 June 1974)

- TANFL 12.10 (82) v Huon FA 8.18 (66) – Att: 1,600 at Huonville Recreation Ground.

=== Leading Goalkickers: TANFL ===
- Frank Ogle (Glenorchy) – 55
- Terry Mayne (Clarence) – 46
- Nigel Ricketts (Sandy Bay) – 43
- Chris Saunders (Sandy Bay) – 43

=== Medal Winners ===
- Tony Browning (New Norfolk) – William Leitch Medal
- P.Smith (Clarence) – George Watt Medal (Reserves)
- L.Berwick (Glenorchy) – V.A Geard Medal (Under-19's)

== 1974 TANFL Ladder ==
Pos	Team	Pld	W	L	D	PF	PA	PP	Pts
1	Glenorchy	21	12	8	1	1886	1718	109.8	50
2	Sandy Bay	21	11	9	1	1952	1632	119.6	46
3	North Hobart	21	10	10	1	1837	1823	100.8	42
4	Clarence	21	10	10	1	1776	1867	95.1	42
5	Hobart	21	9	11	1	1709	1845	92.6	38
6	New Norfolk	21	8	12	1	1733	2008	86.3	34

=== Round 1 ===
(Saturday, 6 April 1974)

- Nth Hobart 10.20 (80) v Glenorchy 9.10 (64) – Att: 4,037 at North Hobart Oval
- New Norfolk 20.19 (139) v Hobart 17.11 (113) – Att: 1,884 at TCA Ground
- Sandy Bay 17.11 (113) v Clarence 7.20 (62) – Att: 3,146 at Bellerive Oval

=== Round 2 ===
(Saturday, 13 April & Monday, 15 April 1974)

- New Norfolk 16.16 (112) v Glenorchy 9.18 (72) – Att: 2,918 at North Hobart Oval
- Nth Hobart 21.19 (145) v Sandy Bay 10.14 (74) – Att: 3,096 at Queenborough Oval
- Hobart 15.16 (106) v Clarence 11.15 (81) – Att: 4,498 at North Hobart Oval (Monday)

=== Round 3 ===
(Saturday, 20 April 1974)

- Hobart 19.14 (128) v Nth Hobart 15.15 (105) – Att: 4,536 at North Hobart Oval
- Glenorchy 14.9 (93) v Sandy Bay 11.19 (85) – Att: 2,605 at KGV Football Park
- Clarence 12.13 (85) v New Norfolk 11.8 (74) – Att: 1,925 at Boyer Oval

=== Round 4 ===
(Thursday, 25 April & Saturday, 27 April 1974)

- Sandy Bay 17.20 (122) v New Norfolk 9.7 (61) – Att: 3,674 at North Hobart Oval (Anzac Day)
- Glenorchy 14.15 (99) v Hobart 11.14 (80) – Att: 4,032 at North Hobart Oval (Saturday)
- Clarence 14.25 (109) v Nth Hobart 16.11 (107) – Att: 3,205 at Bellerive Oval (Saturday)

=== Round 5 ===
(Saturday, 4 May 1974)

- New Norfolk 17.16 (118) v Nth Hobart 13.11 (89) – Att: 3,457 at North Hobart Oval
- Sandy Bay 22.18 (150) v Hobart 10.8 (68) – Att: 2,779 at Queenborough Oval
- Clarence 16.13 (109) v Glenorchy 16.12 (108) – Att: 3,224 at KGV Football Park

=== Round 6 ===
(Saturday, 11 May 1974)

- Sandy Bay 18.14 (122) v Clarence 7.6 (48) – Att: 3,684 at North Hobart Oval
- New Norfolk 15.21 (111) v Hobart 14.17 (101) – Att: 1,692 at TCA Ground
- Nth Hobart 14.23 (107) v Glenorchy 12.16 (88) – Att: 4,123 at KGV Football Park

=== Round 7 ===
(Saturday, 18 May 1974)

- Nth Hobart 14.17 (101) v Sandy Bay 11.11 (77) – Att: 5,105 at North Hobart Oval
- New Norfolk 13.11 (89) v Glenorchy 12.17 (89) – Att: 2,147 at Boyer Oval
- Clarence 14.15 (99) v Hobart 8.13 (61) – Att: 2,127 at Bellerive Oval

=== Round 8 ===
(Saturday, 25 May 1974)

- Clarence 21.12 (138) v New Norfolk 9.13 (67) – Att: 3,005 at North Hobart Oval
- Glenorchy 16.8 (104) v Sandy Bay 14.17 (101) – Att: 2,772 at Queenborough Oval
- Hobart 13.17 (95) v Nth Hobart 14.11 (95) – Att: 2,477 at TCA Ground

=== Round 9 ===
(Saturday, 1 June 1974)

- Clarence 16.12 (108) v Nth Hobart 13.14 (92) – Att: 4,651 at North Hobart Oval
- Sandy Bay 21.8 (134) v New Norfolk 17.9 (111) – Att: 2,071 at Queenborough Oval
- Glenorchy 19.18 (132) v Hobart 8.7 (55) – Att: 2,710 at KGV Football Park

=== Round 10 ===
(Saturday, 8 June. Saturday, 15 June & Monday, 17 June 1974)

- Nth Hobart 11.10 (76) v New Norfolk 7.12 (54) – Att: 2,734 at North Hobart Oval (8 June)
- Hobart 11.12 (78) v Sandy Bay 7.11 (53) – Att: 3,329 at North Hobart Oval (15 June)
- Glenorchy 13.12 (90) v Clarence 11.7 (73) – Att: 5,784 at North Hobart Oval (17 June)

=== Round 11 ===
(Saturday, 22 June 1974)

- Glenorchy 11.11 (77) v Nth Hobart 8.7 (55) – Att: 4,442 at North Hobart Oval
- Hobart 14.11 (95) v New Norfolk 9.7 (61) – Att: 1,430 at Boyer Oval
- Sandy Bay 9.22 (76) v Clarence 2.6 (18) – Att: 2,473 at Bellerive Oval

=== Round 12 ===
(Saturday, 29 June 1974)

- Glenorchy 12.29 (101) v New Norfolk 12.16 (88) – Att: 2,722 at North Hobart Oval
- Clarence 16.11 (107) v Hobart 13.8 (86) – Att: 2,190 at TCA Ground
- Sandy Bay 12.15 (87) v Nth Hobart 10.6 (66) – Att: 2,841 at Queenborough Oval

=== Round 13 ===
(Saturday, 6 July 1974)

- Nth Hobart 8.8 (56) v Hobart 7.12 (54) – Att: 2,199 at North Hobart Oval
- New Norfolk 14.20 (104) v Clarence 9.12 (66) – Att: 1,210 at Boyer Oval
- Glenorchy 11.11 (77) v Sandy Bay 8.12 (60) – Att: 2,427 at KGV Football Park

=== Round 14 ===
(Saturday, 20 July 1974)

- Nth Hobart 8.16 (64) v New Norfolk 8.6 (54) – Att: 2,129 at North Hobart Oval
- Sandy Bay 10.11 (71) v Hobart 4.9 (33) – Att: 1,682 at TCA Ground
- Glenorchy 11.12 (78) v Clarence 6.11 (47) – Att: 1,880 at Bellerive Oval

Note: This round was postponed on 13 July due to inclement weather conditions.

=== Round 15 ===
(Saturday, 3 August 1974)

- Sandy Bay 20.19 (139) v Nth Hobart 9.7 (61) – Att: 3,010 at North Hobart Oval
- Hobart 10.14 (74) v Clarence 6.16 (52) – Att: 1,671 at Bellerive Oval
- Glenorchy 24.14 (158) v New Norfolk 6.6 (42) – Att: 2,331 at KGV Football Park

Note: Originally this was scheduled as Round 16. Round 15 (27 July) was postponed due to poor weather and ground conditions and was eventually replayed on 14 September as Round 21.

=== Round 16 ===
(Saturday, 10 August 1974)

- Sandy Bay 16.14 (110) v Glenorchy 12.9 (81) – Att: 4,822 at North Hobart Oval
- Hobart 10.13 (73) v Nth Hobart 8.12 (60) – Att: 1,184 at Boyer Oval *
- Clarence 16.15 (111) v New Norfolk 10.19 (79) – Att: 1,322 at Queenborough Oval *

Note: Matches scheduled at the TCA Ground and Bellerive Oval switched due to poor ground conditions.

=== Round 17 ===
(Saturday, 17 August 1974)

- Clarence 18.16 (124) v Nth Hobart 13.9 (87) – Att: 3,515 at North Hobart Oval
- New Norfolk 8.17 (65) v Sandy Bay 6.15 (51) – Att: 1,312 at Boyer Oval
- Hobart 12.12 (84) v Glenorchy 12.11 (83) – Att: 2,016 at TCA Ground

=== Round 18 ===
(Saturday, 24 August 1974)

- Glenorchy 12.8 (80) v Clarence 11.11 (77) – Att: 4,042 at North Hobart Oval
- Sandy Bay 14.10 (94) v Hobart 11.12.(78) – Att: 2,466 at Queenborough Oval
- Nth Hobart 17.15 (117) v New Norfolk 8.13 (61) – Att: 1,732 at Boyer Oval

=== Round 19 ===
(Saturday, 31 August 1974)

- Nth Hobart 16.15 (111) v Glenorchy 11.14 (80) – Att: 3,755 at North Hobart Oval
- Hobart 13.15 (93) v New Norfolk 9.12 (66) – Att: 1,270 at Boyer Oval
- Sandy Bay 13.16 (94) v Clarence 14.10.(94) – Att: 2,783 at Queenborough Oval

=== Round 20 ===
(Saturday, 7 September 1974)

- New Norfolk 12.16 (88) v Sandy Bay 8.11 (59) – Att: 1,562 at North Hobart Oval
- Nth Hobart 14.3 (87) v Clarence 10.9 (69) – Att: 2,487 at Bellerive Oval
- Hobart 11.13 (79) v Glenorchy 5.12 (42) – Att: 1,965 at TCA Ground

=== Round 21 ===
(Saturday, 14 September 1974)

- New Norfolk 13.11 (89) v Hobart 10.14 (74) – Att: 1,997 at North Hobart Oval
- Clarence 14.16 (100) v Sandy Bay 12.9 (81) – Att: 2,605 at Queenborough Oval
- Glenorchy 12.18 (90) v Nth Hobart 11.10 (76) – Att: 2,937 at KGV Football Park

Note: This round was originally scheduled as Round 15 to be played on 27 July but was postponed due to poor weather.

=== First Semi Final ===
(Saturday, 21 September 1974)

- Nth Hobart: 3.4 (22) | 9.4 (58) | 13.10 (88) | 15.16 (106)
- Clarence: 3.3 (21) | 5.7 (37) | 5.9 (39) | 8.17 (65)
- Attendance: 7,795 at North Hobart Oval

=== Second Semi Final ===
(Sunday, 22 September 1974)

- Sandy Bay: 3.2 (20) | 7.6 (48) | 8.13 (61) | 15.15 (105)
- Glenorchy: 6.6 (42) | 8.8 (56) | 9.9 (63) | 12.14 (86)
- Attendance: 7,850 at North Hobart Oval

=== Preliminary Final ===
(Saturday, 28 September 1974)

- Nth Hobart: 5.5 (35) | 11.8 (74) | 15.9 (99) | 20.10 (130)
- Glenorchy: 1.2 (8) | 3.7 (25) | 8.11 (59) | 12.17 (89)
- Attendance: 8,427 at North Hobart Oval

=== Grand Final ===
(Saturday, 5 October 1974)

- Nth Hobart: 5.1 (31) | 13.6 (84) | 15.9 (99) | 21.10 (136)
- Sandy Bay: 4.5 (29) | 4.8 (32) | 11.13 (79) | 15.18 (108)
- Attendance: 16,234 at North Hobart Oval

Source: All scores and statistics courtesy of the Hobart Mercury and Saturday Evening Mercury (SEM) publications, also Tasmanian Football Record publications.
