= 1977 TANFL season =

Australian rules football season in Tasmania

- Teams: Clarence Kangaroos; Glenorchy Magpies; Hobart Tigers; New Norfolk Eagles; North Hobart Demons; Sandy Bay Seagulls
- Premiers: Sandy Bay
- Minor premiers: Sandy Bay; 7th minor premiership

Attendance
- Matches played: 49
- Total attendance: 111,044 (2,266 per match)

The 1977 Tasmanian Australian National Football League (TANFL) premiership season was an Australian rules football competition staged in Hobart, Tasmania over fifteen (15) roster rounds and four (4) finals series matches between 16 April and 10 September 1977.

== Participating Clubs ==
- Clarence District Football Club
- Glenorchy District Football Club
- Hobart Football Club
- New Norfolk District Football Club
- North Hobart Football Club
- Sandy Bay Football Club

=== 1977 TANFL Club Coaches ===
- Robin Norris (Clarence)
- Jack Rough (Glenorchy)
- Barry Grinter (Hobart)
- Peter Chisnall (New Norfolk)
- Ian Bremner (North Hobart)
- Paul Sproule (Sandy Bay)

=== TANFL Reserves Grand Final ===
- Glenorchy 12.17 (89) v New Norfolk 9.15 (69) – North Hobart Oval

=== TANFL Under-19's Grand Final ===
- Not Available.

=== Interstate Matches ===
Ardath Cup (Tuesday, 26 April 1977)

- South Fremantle 13.14 (92) v Tasmania 13.11 (89) – Att: N/A at Norwood Oval, Adelaide

Interstate Match (Sunday, 12 June 1977)

- Victoria 24.28 (172) v Tasmania 9.9 (63) – Att: 10,369 at North Hobart Oval

=== Intrastate Matches ===
Jubilee Shield (Saturday, 14 May 1977)

- TANFL 18.17 (125) v NWFU 16.17 (113) – Att: 4,378 at North Hobart Oval

Jubilee Shield (Saturday, 21 May 1977)

- NWFU 21.15 (141) v TANFL 15.8 (98) – Att: 3,536 at Devonport Oval

Inter-Association Match (Saturday, 7 May 1977)

- TANFL 29.29 (203) v WTFA 5.7 (37) – Att: 3,387 at North Hobart Oval

=== Leading Goalkickers: TANFL ===
- Col Smith (Hobart) – 49
- John Hollis (Sandy Bay) – 42
- Roland Curley (Glenorchy) – 34
- Don McLeod (Nth Hobart) – 28

=== Medal Winners ===
- Michael Hawkins (Nth Hobart) – William Leitch Medal
- R.Murley (New Norfolk) – George Watt Medal (Reserves)
- Dan Munnings (New Norfolk) – V.A Geard Medal (Under-19's)
- David Jones (Sandy Bay) – Weller Arnold Medal (Best TANFL player in Intrastate Matches)

== 1977 TANFL Ladder ==
Pos	Team	Pld	W	L	D	PF	PA	PP	Pts
1	Sandy Bay	15	14	1	0	1570	959	163.7	56
2	New Norfolk	15	11	4	0	1433	1278	112.1	44
3	Glenorchy	15	10	5	0	1374	1177	116.7	40
4	North Hobart	15	5	10	0	1155	1310	88.2	20
5	Hobart	15	3	12	0	1239	1539	80.5	12
6	Clarence	15	2	13	0	956	1484	64.4	8

=== Round 1 ===
(Saturday, 16 April 1977)

- New Norfolk 13.11 (89) v Nth Hobart 11.15 (81) – Att: 2,486 at North Hobart Oval
- Sandy Bay 12.18 (90) v Hobart 7.8 (50) – Att: 1,150 at TCA Ground
- Glenorchy 9.16 (70) v Clarence 9.9 (63) – Att: 1,675 at Bellerive Oval

=== Round 2 ===
(Saturday, 23 April & Monday, 25 April 1977)

- Nth Hobart 15.13 (103) v Clarence 4.12 (36) – Att: 2,859 at North Hobart Oval
- Glenorchy 15.6 (96) v Hobart 13.10 (88) – Att: 1,950 at KGV Football Park
- Sandy Bay 19.18 (132) v New Norfolk 12.14 (86) – Att: 3,173 at North Hobart Oval (Monday)

=== Round 3 ===
(Saturday, 30 April 1977)

- Hobart 18.21 (129) v Clarence 13.12 (90) – Att: 1,563 at North Hobart Oval
- Sandy Bay 12.8 (80) v Nth Hobart 8.17 (65) – Att: 2,008 at Queenborough Oval
- Glenorchy 18.13 (121) v New Norfolk 8.13 (61) – Att: 1,855 at Boyer Oval

=== Round 4 ===
(Saturday, 21 May 1977)

- New Norfolk 17.8 (110) v Hobart 15.19 (109) – Att: 1,341 at North Hobart Oval
- Sandy Bay 12.14 (86) v Clarence 10.19 (79) – Att: 1,332 at Queenborough Oval
- Glenorchy 14.10 (94) v Nth Hobart 10.6 (66) – Att: 2,036 at KGV Football Park

=== Round 5 ===
(Saturday, 28 May 1977)

- Sandy Bay 19.10 (124) v Glenorchy 6.10 (46) – Att: 3,182 at North Hobart Oval
- Hobart 11.13 (79) v Nth Hobart 8.18 (66) – Att: 1,196 at TCA Ground
- New Norfolk 11.7 (73) v Clarence 10.11 (71) – Att: 1,252 at Bellerive Oval

=== Round 6 ===
(Saturday, 4 June 1977)

- Glenorchy 23.13 (151) v Clarence 9.13 (67) – Att: 2,095 at North Hobart Oval
- Sandy Bay 21.10 (136) v Hobart 10.8 (68) – Att: 1,652 at Queenborough Oval
- New Norfolk 24.13 (157) v Nth Hobart 13.6 (84) – Att: 1,402 at Boyer Oval

=== Round 7 ===
(Saturday, 11 June 1977)

- Clarence 11.15 (81) v Nth Hobart 8.8 (56) – Att: 1,542 at North Hobart Oval
- Sandy Bay 13.10 (88) v New Norfolk 7.16 (58) – Att: 1,561 at Queenborough Oval
- Glenorchy 15.14 (104) v Hobart 9.12 (66) – Att: 1,695 at KGV Football Park

=== Round 8 ===
(Saturday, 18 June 1977)

- Sandy Bay 14.20 (104) v Nth Hobart 12.11 (83) – Att: 1,673 at North Hobart Oval
- New Norfolk 13.14 (92) v Glenorchy 13.7 (85) – Att: 1,866 at KGV Football Park
- Clarence 9.21 (75) v Hobart 9.11 (65) – Att: 1,394 at Bellerive Oval

=== Round 9 ===
(Saturday, 25 June 1977)

- Glenorchy 6.21 (57) v Nth Hobart 7.10 (52) – Att: 2,138 at North Hobart Oval
- Sandy Bay 20.18 (138) v Clarence 7.12 (54) – Att: 1,272 at Bellerive Oval
- New Norfolk 18.8 (116) v Hobart 9.14 (68) – Att: 1,191 at Boyer Oval

=== Round 10 ===
(Saturday, 2 July 1977)

- Nth Hobart 17.11 (113) v Hobart 13.13 (91) – Att: 1,368 at TCA Ground
- Sandy Bay 12.15 (87) v Glenorchy 8.12 (60) – Att: 2,089 at Queenborough Oval
- New Norfolk 16.13 (109) v Clarence 9.10 (64) – Att: 1,391 at KGV Football Park

=== Round 11 ===
(Saturday, 9 July 1977)

- Sandy Bay 12.21 (93) v Hobart 13.9 (87) – Att: 1,621 at North Hobart Oval
- Glenorchy 16.13 (109) v Clarence 11.10 (76) – Att: 1,607 at KGV Football Park
- New Norfolk 10.12 (72) v Nth Hobart 7.11 (53) – Att: 1,773 at Boyer Oval

=== Round 12 ===
(Saturday, 16 July 1977)

- Glenorchy 15.16 (106) v Hobart 5.8 (38) – Att: 2,087 at North Hobart Oval
- Nth Hobart 13.9 (87) v Clarence 9.6 (60) – Att: 1,433 at Bellerive Oval
- Sandy Bay 10.20 (80) v New Norfolk 7.10 (52) – Att: 2,040 at Boyer Oval

=== Round 13 ===
(Saturday, 23 July & Saturday, 30 July 1977)

- New Norfolk 17.7 (109) v Glenorchy 13.15 (93) – Att: 2,749 at North Hobart Oval (23 July)
- Hobart 16.14 (110) v Clarence 6.12 (48) – Att: 964 at TCA Ground (23 July)
- Sandy Bay 16.25 (121) v Nth Hobart 6.8 (44) – Att: 2,675 at North Hobart Oval (30 July)

=== Round 14 ===
(Saturday, 6 August 1977)

- Sandy Bay 18.19 (127) v Clarence 5.8 (38) – Att: 1,251 at North Hobart Oval
- New Norfolk 28.10 (178) v Hobart 13.17 (95) – Att: 1,356 at TCA Ground
- Nth Hobart 16.9 (105) v Glenorchy 12.21 (93) – Att: 1,818 at KGV Football Park

=== Round 15 ===
(Saturday, 13 August 1977)

- Nth Hobart 13.19 (97) v Hobart 14.12 (96) – Att: 1,816 at North Hobart Oval
- Glenorchy 12.17 (89) v Sandy Bay 11.17 (83) – Att: 1,964 at KGV Football Park
- New Norfolk 10.11 (71) v Clarence 8.6 (54) – Att: 1,176 at Boyer Oval

=== First Semi Final ===
(Saturday, 20 August 1977)

- Glenorchy: 3.9 (27) | 8.12 (60) | 11.17 (83) | 13.22 (100)
- Nth Hobart: 4.2 (26) | 6.3 (39) | 11.5 (71) | 13.8 (86)
- Attendance: 4,825 at North Hobart Oval

=== Second Semi Final ===
(Saturday, 27 August 1977)

- Sandy Bay: 3.3 (21) | 8.6 (54) | 15.9 (99) | 18.10 (118)
- New Norfolk: 5.3 (33) | 9.5 (59) | 15.5 (95) | 16.10 (106)
- Attendance: 7,931 at North Hobart Oval

=== Preliminary Final ===
(Saturday, 3 September 1977)

- Glenorchy: 1.4 (10) | 6.9 (45) | 10.11 (71) | 14.16 (100)
- New Norfolk: 2.7 (19) | 2.11 (23) | 5.12 (42) | 7.13 (55)
- Attendance: 5,611 at North Hobart Oval

=== Grand Final ===
(Saturday, 10 September 1977)

- Sandy Bay: 6.5 (41) | 9.5 (59) | 15.7 (97) | 19.9 (123)
- Glenorchy: 0.3 (3) | 1.7 (13) | 1.9 (15) | 5.14 (44)
- Attendance: 12,960 at North Hobart Oval

Source: All scores and statistics courtesy of the Hobart Mercury and Saturday Evening Mercury (SEM) publications.
