= 1968 TANFL season =

Australian rules football season

- Teams: Clarence Kangaroos; Glenorchy Magpies; Hobart Tigers; New Norfolk Eagles; North Hobart Robins; Sandy Bay Seagulls
- Premiers: New Norfolk
- Minor premiers: New Norfolk; 4th minor premiership

Attendance
- Matches played: 64
- Total attendance: 277,769 (4,340 per match)

The 1968 Tasmanian Australian National Football League (TANFL) premiership season was an Australian Rules football competition staged in Hobart, Tasmania over twenty (20) roster rounds and four (4) finals series matches, between 6 April and 21 September 1968.

== Participating Clubs ==
- Clarence District Football Club
- Glenorchy District Football Club
- Hobart Football Club
- New Norfolk District Football Club
- North Hobart Football Club
- Sandy Bay Football Club

=== 1968 TANFL Club Coaches ===
- John Bingley (Clarence)
- Bobby Parsons (Glenorchy)
- John Watts (Hobart)
- Trevor Leo (New Norfolk)
- John Devine (North Hobart)
- Ray Giblett (Sandy Bay)

=== TANFL Reserves Grand Final ===
- Glenorchy 10.18 (78) v New Norfolk 10.15 (75) – North Hobart Oval

=== TANFL Under-19's Grand Final ===
(Saturday, 28 September 1968)

- Glenorchy 9.11 (65) v New Norfolk 7.1 (43) – North Hobart Oval

=== State Preliminary Final ===
(Saturday, 28 September 1968)

- Scottsdale 16.15 (111) v East Devonport 11.10 (76) – Att: 7,659 at York Park

=== State Grand Final ===
(Saturday, 5 October 1968)

- New Norfolk: 1.4 (10) | 3.10 (28) | 5.11 (41) | 9.13 (67)
- Scottsdale: 1.0 (6) | 3.4 (22) | 6.9 (45) | 7.12 (54)
- Attendance: 11,329 at North Hobart Oval

=== Intrastate Matches ===
Jubilee Shield (Saturday, 11 May 1968)

- NWFU 17.10 (112) v TANFL 9.16 (70) – Att: 10,705 at North Hobart Oval

Jubilee Shield (Saturday, 15 June 1968)

- NTFA 12.13 (85) v TANFL 11.14 (80) – Att: 6,784 at York Park

=== Interstate Match ===
(Saturday, 29 June 1968)

- Victorian FA 19.15 (129) v Tasmania 18.8 (116) – Att: 10,688 at York Park

=== Leading Goalkickers: TANFL ===
- John Mills (Clarence) – 49
- Graeme "Harry" Dwyer (Nth Hobart) – 40
- Ben Nusteling (New Norfolk) – 40
- David Collins (Nth Hobart) – 39

=== Medal Winners ===
- Bob Lucas (Clarence) – William Leitch Medal
- Bill Patmore (Nth Hobart) & Wayne Hayes (Glenorchy) – George Watt Medal (Reserves)
- S.Appleby (Buckingham) & A.Caudwell (Nth Hobart) – V.A Geard Medal (Under-19's)
- John Devine (Nth Hobart) – Lefroy Medal (Best player in Interstate match)
- Roger Steele (Sandy Bay) – Weller Arnold Medal (Best player in Intrastate matches)

== 1968 TANFL Ladder ==
Pos	Team	Pld	W	L	D	PF	PA	PP	Pts
1	New Norfolk	20	12	7	1	1617	1460	110.8	50
2	North Hobart	20	12	8	0	1615	1435	112.5	48
3	Clarence	20	11	8	1	1620	1442	112.3	46
4	Glenorchy	20	9	11	0	1605	1591	100.9	36
5	Sandy Bay	20	8	11	1	1489	1689	88.2	32 (Note: 2 points deducted?)
6	Hobart	20	6	13	1	1458	1787	81.6	26

=== Round 1 ===
(Saturday, 6 April 1968)

- Sandy Bay 14.19 (103) v Nth Hobart 14.11 (95) – Att: 5,722 at North Hobart Oval
- New Norfolk 13.10 (88) v Hobart 12.7 (79) – Att: 2,126 at Boyer Oval
- Clarence 14.12 (96) v Glenorchy 9.15 (69) – Att: 3,851 at Bellerive Oval

=== Round 2 ===
(Saturday, 13 April & Monday, 15 April 1968)

- New Norfolk 14.9 (93) v Glenorchy 13.9 (87) – Att: 5,617 at North Hobart Oval
- Hobart 12.18 (90) v Sandy Bay 8.14 (62) – Att: 3,366 at TCA Ground
- Clarence 9.9 (63) v Nth Hobart 9.7 (61) – Att: 8,593 at North Hobart Oval (Monday) *

Note: North Hobart Football Club's record home attendance.

=== Round 3 ===
(Saturday, 20 April 1968)

- Nth Hobart 17.14 (116) v Hobart 10.13 (73) – Att: 4,894 at North Hobart Oval
- New Norfolk 13.10 (88) v Clarence 10.14 (74) – Att: 3,791 at Bellerive Oval
- Sandy Bay 14.13 (97) v Glenorchy 14.8 (92) – Att: 3,200 at KGV Park

=== Round 4 ===
(Thursday, 25 April & Saturday, 27 April 1968)

- Hobart 9.14 (68) v Clarence 9.11 (65) – Att: 7,381 at North Hobart Oval (Anzac Day)
- Glenorchy 14.8 (92) v Nth Hobart 7.10 (52) – Att: 4,764 at KGV Park
- New Norfolk 10.11 (71) v Sandy Bay 7.12 (54) – Att: 5,595 at North Hobart Oval (Monday)

=== Round 5 ===
(Saturday, 4 May 1968)

- Nth Hobart 8.9 (57) v New Norfolk 7.13 (55) – Att: 3,404 at North Hobart Oval
- Clarence 10.8 (68) v Sandy Bay 9.7 (61) – Att: 2,675 at Queenborough Oval
- Hobart 10.18 (78) v Glenorchy 8.15 (63) – Att: 2,158 at TCA Ground

=== Round 6 ===
(Saturday, 18 May 1968)

- Glenorchy 15.10 (100) v Clarence 12.12 (84) – Att: 4,728 at North Hobart Oval
- New Norfolk 13.9 (87) v Hobart 10.10 (70) – Att: 2,317 at Boyer Oval
- Sandy Bay 9.14 (68) v Nth Hobart 9.13 (67) – Att: 3,155 at Queenborough Oval

=== Round 7 ===
(Saturday, 25 May 1968)

- Sandy Bay 17.14 (116) v Hobart 15.11 (101) – Att: 3,069 at North Hobart Oval
- Clarence 12.10 (82) v Nth Hobart 8.12 (60) – Att: 3,013 at Bellerive Oval
- Glenorchy 13.10 (88) v New Norfolk 11.12 (78) – Att: 3,549 at KGV Park

=== Round 8 ===
(Saturday, 1 June 1968)

- New Norfolk 14.15 (99) v Clarence 13.16 (94) – Att: 4,468 at North Hobart Oval
- Glenorchy 14.5 (89) v Sandy Bay 12.13 (85) – Att: 3,624 at Queenborough Oval
- Nth Hobart 13.14 (92) v Hobart 10.12 (72) – Att: 2,685 at TCA Ground

=== Round 9 ===
(Saturday, 8 June & Monday, 10 June 1968)

- Sandy Bay 15.8 (98) v New Norfolk 13.10 (88) – Att: 5,464 at North Hobart Oval
- Hobart 9.16 (70) v Clarence 10.8 (68) – Att: 3,032 at TCA Ground
- Nth Hobart 9.27 (81) v Glenorchy 11.8 (74) – Att: 6,724 at North Hobart Oval (Monday)

=== Round 10 ===
(Saturday, 15 June 1968)

- Glenorchy 10.12 (72) v Hobart 8.15 (63) – Att: 4,024 at North Hobart Oval
- Clarence 12.11 (83) v Sandy Bay 5.10 (40) – Att: 3,386 at Bellerive Oval
- New Norfolk 9.19 (73) v Nth Hobart 10.10 (70) – Att: 2,565 at Boyer Oval

=== Round 11 ===
(Saturday, 22 June 1968)

- Nth Hobart 17.10 (112) v Sandy Bay 8.5 (53) – Att: 4,319 at North Hobart Oval
- Glenorchy 13.14 (92) v Clarence 11.15 (81) – Att: 3,614 at KGV Park
- Hobart 13.9 (87) v New Norfolk 12.15 (87) – Att: 2,045 at TCA Ground

=== Round 12 ===
(Saturday, 29 June 1968)

- Glenorchy 9.13 (67) v New Norfolk 7.22 (64) – Att: 3,616 at North Hobart Oval
- Nth Hobart 10.16 (76) v Clarence 7.12 (54) – Att: 2,632 at Bellerive Oval
- Sandy Bay 9.14 (68) v Hobart 7.10 (52) – Att: 1,868 at Queenborough Oval

=== Round 13 ===
(Saturday, 6 July 1968)

- Nth Hobart 13.7 (85) v Hobart 9.8 (62) – Att: 3,916 at North Hobart Oval
- Sandy Bay 19.7 (121) v Glenorchy 11.15 (81) – Att: 3,348 at KGV Park
- Clarence 10.13 (73) v New Norfolk 9.11 (65) – Att: 2,795 at Boyer Oval

=== Round 14 ===
(Saturday, 13 July 1968)

- Clarence 19.18 (132) v Hobart 11.6 (72) – Att: 3,440 at North Hobart Oval
- New Norfolk 19.9 (123) v Sandy Bay 5.8 (38) – Att: 2,206 at Boyer Oval
- Nth Hobart 11.15 (81) v Glenorchy 10.10 (70) – Att: 3,895 at KGV Park

=== Round 15 ===
(Saturday, 20 July 1968)

- New Norfolk 14.13 (97) v Nth Hobart 13.11 (89) – Att: 5,431 at North Hobart Oval
- Sandy Bay 11.16 (82) v Clarence 12.10 (82) – Att: 3,366 at Queenborough Oval
- Hobart 13.16 (94) v Glenorchy 10.12 (72) – Att: 2,054 at TCA Ground

=== Round 16 ===
(Saturday, 27 July 1968)

- New Norfolk 15.11 (101) v Hobart 11.8 (74) – Att: 3,041 at North Hobart Oval
- Nth Hobart 11.19 (85) v Sandy Bay 13.5 (83) – Att: 3,488 at Queenborough Oval
- Clarence 16.11 (107) v Glenorchy 12.18 (90) – Att: 3,138 at Bellerive Oval

=== Round 17 ===
(Saturday, 3 August 1968)

- Clarence 9.11 (65) v Nth Hobart 9.10 (64) – Att: 4,695 at North Hobart Oval
- Glenorchy 7.6 (48) v New Norfolk 6.9 (45) – Att: 1,654 at Boyer Oval
- Hobart 13.12 (90) v Sandy Bay 7.8 (50) – Att: 1,622 at TCA Ground

=== Round 18 ===
(Saturday, 10 August 1968)

- Sandy Bay 10.9 (69) v Glenorchy 8.10 (58) – Att: 3,888 at North Hobart Oval
- New Norfolk 9.9 (63) v Clarence 8.11 (59) – Att: 3,623 at Bellerive Oval
- Nth Hobart 18.12 (120) v Hobart 8.10 (58) – Att: 2,603 at TCA Ground

=== Round 19 ===
(Saturday, 17 August 1968)

- Nth Hobart 9.18 (72) v Glenorchy 8.14 (62) – Att: 4,890 at North Hobart Oval
- New Norfolk 12.5 (77) v Sandy Bay 11.8 (74) – Att: 3,187 at Queenborough Oval
- Clarence 15.14 (104) v Hobart 7.13 (55) – Att: 2,641 at Bellerive Oval

=== Round 20 ===
(Saturday, 24 August 1968)

- Clarence 11.19 (85) v Sandy Bay 10.7 (67) – Att: 5,665 at North Hobart Oval
- Nth Hobart 11.14 (80) v New Norfolk 11.10 (76) – Att: 3,121 at Boyer Oval
- Glenorchy 21.14 (140) v Hobart 7.6 (48) – Att: 2,447 at KGV Park

=== First Semi Final ===
(Saturday, 31 August 1968)

- Clarence: 4.1 (25) | 9.4 (58) | 12.7 (79) | 17.14 (116)
- Glenorchy: 2.1 (13) | 5.2 (32) | 7.4 (46) | 9.8 (62)
- Attendance: 11,736 at North Hobart Oval

=== Second Semi Final ===
(Saturday, 7 September 1968)

- Nth Hobart: 5.3 (33) | 10.5 (65) | 12.8 (80) | 18.13 (121)
- New Norfolk: 1.7 (13) | 3.8 (26) | 7.13 (55) | 9.14 (68)
- Attendance: 11,172 at North Hobart Oval

=== Preliminary Final ===
(Saturday, 14 September 1968)

- New Norfolk: 3.4 (22) | 4.11 (35) | 7.14 (56) | 7.18 (60)
- Clarence: 0.4 (4) | 1.6 (12) | 2.6 (18) | 6.11 (47)
- Attendance: 14,347 at North Hobart Oval

=== Grand Final ===
(Saturday, 21 September 1968)

- New Norfolk: 3.4 (22) | 4.6 (30) | 10.11 (71) | 14.13 (97)
- Nth Hobart: 1.3 (9) | 3.7 (25) | 4.9 (33) | 9.14 (68)
- Attendance: 19,236 at North Hobart Oval

Source: All scores and statistics courtesy of the Hobart Mercury and Saturday Evening Mercury (SEM) publications.
