= 1955 TANFL season =

Australian rules football season

- Teams: Clarence Kangaroos; New Town Magpies; Hobart Tigers; New Norfolk Eagles; North Hobart Robins; Sandy Bay Seagulls
- Premiers: New Town
- Minor premiers: Hobart; 6th minor premiership

Attendance
- Matches played: 49
- Total attendance: 151,807 (3,098 per match)

The 1955 Tasmanian Australian National Football League (TANFL) premiership season was an Australian Rules football competition staged in Hobart, Tasmania over fifteen (15) roster rounds and four (4) finals series matches between 9 April and 17 September 1955.

== Participating Clubs ==
- Clarence District Football Club
- New Town District Football Club
- Hobart Football Club
- New Norfolk District Football Club
- North Hobart Football Club
- Sandy Bay Football Club

=== 1955 TANFL Club Coaches ===
- Les McClements (Clarence)
- Jack Rough (Glenorchy)
- Bill Williams (Hobart)
- Rex Garwood (New Norfolk)
- John Leedham (North Hobart)
- Gordon Bowman (Sandy Bay)

=== TANFL Reserves Grand Final ===
(Saturday, 24 September 1955)

- Hobart 16.14 (110) v Sandy Bay 4.8 (32) – Att: 1,779 at North Hobart Oval

Note: This match was played one week after the senior Grand Final due to a drawn Preliminary Final.

=== TANFL Under-19's Grand Final ===
State Schools Old Boys Football Association (SSOBFA)

- South East 7.4 (46) v North West 4.17 (41) – New Town Oval

Note: South East affiliated to Sandy Bay, North West affiliated to North Hobart.

=== State Preliminary Final ===
(Saturday, 24 September 1955)

- Ulverstone: 3.10 (28) | 7.19 (61) | 9.24 (78) | 12.29 (101)
- New Town: 2.3 (15) | 4.9 (33) | 5.12 (42) | 7.15 (57)
- Attendance: 5,307 at Ulverstone Recreation Ground

=== State Grand Final ===
(Saturday, 1 October 1955)

- Ulverstone: 5.4 (34) | 9.6 (60) | 14.8 (92) | 19.12 (126)
- Longford: 3.3 (21) | 5.5 (35) | 12.7 (79) | 12.13 (85)
- Attendance: 10,004 at York Park

=== Intrastate Matches ===
Jubilee Shield (Saturday, 7 May 1955)

- NWFU 14.10 (94) v TANFL 13.12 (90) – Att: 6,127 at West Park Oval

Jubilee Shield (Saturday, 11 June 1955)

- TANFL 19.16 (130) v NTFA 16.22 (118) – Att: 8,711 at North Hobart Oval

Jubilee Shield (Monday, 13 June 1955)

- NWFU 15.18 (108) v TANFL 13.25 (103) – Att: 11,047 at North Hobart Oval

Jubilee Shield (Saturday, 16 July 1955)

- TANFL 15.11 (101) v NTFA 9.13 (67) – Att: 6,304 at York Park

Inter-Association Match (Saturday, 7 May 1955)

- Huon FA 13.13 (91) v TANFL II 13.9 (87) – Att: 1,400 at Huonville Recreation Ground

Inter-Association Match (Saturday, 7 May 1955)

- Midlands FA 15.12 (102) v TANFL III 8.16 (64) – Att: 1,970 at North Hobart Oval

=== Interstate Matches ===
Interstate Match (Saturday, 16 July 1955)

- Tasmania 20.19 (139) v Canberra 9.7 (61) – Att: 3,329 at Manuka Oval

Interstate Match (Sunday, 17 July 1955)

- Tasmania 21.18 (144) v New South Wales 7.12 (54) – Att: 4,671 at Manuka Oval

=== Leading Goalkickers: TANFL ===
- Ian Westell (Sandy Bay) – 85
- Terry Brain (Hobart) – 54
- Max Griffiths (New Town) – 50
- Neville Legro (Hobart) – 47
- Paddy Cooper (North Hobart) – 45

=== Medal Winners ===
- Rex Garwood (New Norfolk) – William Leitch Medal
- A.Peterson (North Hobart) – George Watt Medal (Reserves)
- Dennis Lester (Buckingham) – V.A Geard Medal (Under-19's)
- Max Griffiths (New Town) – Weller Arnold Medal (Best TANFL player in Intrastate match)

== 1955 TANFL Ladder ==
Pos	Team	Pld	W	L	D	PF	PA	PP	Pts
1	Hobart	15	12	3	0	1581	1184	133.5	48
2	New Town	15	10	5	0	1471	1184	124.2	40
3	Sandy Bay	15	10	5	0	1236	1245	99.3	40
4	North Hobart	15	9	6	0	1397	1164	120.0	36
5	New Norfolk	15	3	12	0	1039	1471	70.6	12
6	Clarence	15	1	14	0	1129	1605	70.3	4

=== Round 1 ===
(Saturday, 9 April, Monday, 11 April & Saturday 16 April 1955)

- Nth Hobart 14.16 (100) v Hobart 8.16 (64) – Att: 5,703 at North Hobart Oval (9 April)
- New Town 22.19 (151) v New Norfolk 10.9 (69) – Att: 4,041 at North Hobart Oval (11 April)
- Sandy Bay 16.16 (112) v Clarence 10.14 (74) – Att: 4,431 at North Hobart Oval (16 April)

=== Round 2 ===
(Saturday, 23 April 1955)

- Nth Hobart 19.10 (124) v New Norfolk 12.9 (81) – Att: 2,218 at North Hobart Oval
- Sandy Bay 14.15 (99) v New Town 13.13 (91) – Att: 3,670 at Queenborough Oval
- Hobart 21.26 (152) v Clarence 9.13 (67) – Att: 1,328 at Bellerive Oval

=== Round 3 ===
(Saturday, 30 April 1955)

- Nth Hobart 16.8 (104) v Sandy Bay 12.7 (79) – Att: 5,986 at North Hobart Oval
- New Town 17.11 (113) v Clarence 11.14 (80) – Att: 1,380 at New Town Oval
- Hobart 21.20 (146) v New Norfolk 7.11 (53) – Att: 1,173 at Boyer Oval

=== Round 4 ===
(Saturday, 14 May 1955)

- Hobart 17.14 (116) v New Town 8.14 (62) – Att: 3,973 at North Hobart Oval
- Sandy Bay 8.16 (64) v New Norfolk 8.7 (55) – Att: 1,380 at Queenborough Oval
- Clarence 17.9 (111) v Nth Hobart 12.17 (89) – Att: 1,575 at Bellerive Oval

=== Round 5 ===
(Saturday, 21 May 1955)

- Hobart 18.13 (121) v Sandy Bay 16.17 (113) – Att: 3,397 at North Hobart Oval
- Nth Hobart 15.17 (107) v New Town 15.14 (104) – Att: 3,293 at New Town Oval
- New Norfolk 13.12 (90) v Clarence 13.9 (87) – Att: 1,231 at Bellerive Oval

=== Round 6 ===
(Saturday, 28 May 1955)

- Hobart 15.15 (105) v Nth Hobart 7.15 (57) – Att: 6,085 at North Hobart Oval
- New Town 11.13 (79) v New Norfolk 9.8 (62) – Att: 1,713 at New Town Oval
- Sandy Bay 15.21 (111) v Clarence 12.14 (86) – Att: 1,645 at Bellerive Oval

=== Round 7 ===
(Saturday, 4 June 1955)

- Hobart 17.21 (123) v Clarence 11.8 (74) – Att: 1,625 at North Hobart Oval
- New Town 12.14 (86) v Sandy Bay 7.11 (53) – Att: 3,532 at New Town Oval
- Nth Hobart 15.16 (106) v New Norfolk 8.6 (54) – Att: 1,427 at Boyer Oval

=== Round 8 ===
(Saturday, 18 June 1955)

- Hobart 13.23 (101) v New Norfolk 10.16 (76) – Att: 1,441 at North Hobart Oval
- Sandy Bay 11.13 (79) v Nth Hobart 7.12 (54) – Att: 2,915 at Queenborough Oval
- New Town 14.8 (92) v Clarence 10.10 (70) – Att: 1,366 at Bellerive Oval

=== Round 9 ===
(Saturday, 25 June 1955)

- Nth Hobart 16.15 (111) v Clarence 4.10 (34) – Att: 1,944 at North Hobart Oval
- New Town 21.22 (148) v Hobart 16.10 (106) – Att: 3,763 at New Town Oval
- Sandy Bay 11.8 (74) v New Norfolk 10.12 (72) – Att: 1,152 at Boyer Oval

=== Round 10 ===
(Saturday, 2 July 1955)

- New Town 15.12 (102) v Nth Hobart 12.13 (85) – Att: 4,163 at North Hobart Oval
- Hobart 19.18 (132) v Sandy Bay 12.7 (79) – Att: 2,558 at Queenborough Oval
- New Norfolk 13.15 (93) v Clarence 12.11 (83) – Att: 1,040 at Boyer Oval

=== Round 11 ===
(Saturday, 9 July 1955)

- Hobart 11.11 (77) v Nth Hobart 8.11 (59) – Att: 2,504 at North Hobart Oval
- Sandy Bay 10.11 (71) v Clarence 7.9 (51) – Att: 754 at Queenborough Oval
- New Town 8.13 (61) v New Norfolk 6.5 (41) – Att: 839 at Boyer Oval

=== Round 12 ===
(Saturday, 23 July 1955)

- Nth Hobart 18.9 (117) v New Norfolk 9.10 (64) – Att: 2,199 at North Hobart Oval
- Sandy Bay 13.9 (87) v New Town 12.13 (85) – Att: 3,357 at New Town Oval
- Hobart 16.15 (111) v Clarence 14.11 (95) – Att: 896 at Bellerive Oval

=== Round 13 ===
(Saturday, 6 August 1955)

- Nth Hobart 16.7 (103) v Sandy Bay 5.16 (46) – Att: 5,183 at North Hobart Oval
- New Town 18.18 (126) v Clarence 8.17 (65) – Att: 1,557 at New Town Oval
- Hobart 13.13 (91) v New Norfolk 8.12 (60) – Att: 810 at Boyer Oval

Note: Round postponed on 30 July due to inclement weather conditions.

=== Round 14 ===
(Saturday, 13 August 1955)

- Hobart 15.4 (94) v New Town 12.11 (83) – Att: 5,002 at North Hobart Oval
- Sandy Bay 16.15 (111) v New Norfolk 13.11 (89) – Att: 1,035 at Queenborough Oval
- Nth Hobart 19.17 (131) v Clarence 11.10 (76) – Att: 1,008 at Bellerive Oval

=== Round 15 ===
(Saturday, 20 August 1955)

- Sandy Bay 7.16 (58) v Hobart 5.12 (42) – Att: 3,877 at North Hobart Oval
- New Town 13.10 (88) v Nth Hobart 7.8 (50) – Att: 1,608 at New Town Oval
- New Norfolk 11.14 (80) v Clarence 11.10 (76) – Att: 542 at Bellerive Oval

=== First Semi Final ===
(Saturday, 27 August 1955)

- Sandy Bay: 6.3 (39) | 6.4 (40) | 9.9 (63) | 12.10 (82)
- Nth Hobart: 1.4 (10) | 6.10 (46) | 9.15 (69) | 10.20 (80)
- Attendance: 7,644 at North Hobart Oval

=== Second Semi Final ===
(Saturday, 3 September 1955)

- New Town: 0.1 (1) | 4.4 (28) | 10.11 (71) | 12.11 (83)
- Hobart: 5.4 (34) | 6.11 (47) | 8.14 (62) | 9.18 (72)
- Attendance: 8,697 at North Hobart Oval

=== Preliminary Final ===
(Saturday, 10 September 1955)

- Hobart: 2.8 (20) | 6.14 (50) | 9.17 (71) | 13.17 (95)
- Sandy Bay: 2.3 (15) | 5.7 (37) | 6.9 (45) | 11.12 (78)
- Attendance: 9,718 at North Hobart Oval

=== Grand Final ===
(Saturday, 17 September 1955)

- New Town: 4.2 (26) | 6.8 (44) | 11.8 (74) | 15.11 (101)
- Hobart: 2.4 (16) | 4.7 (31) | 6.13 (49) | 8.18 (66)
- Attendance: 13,429 at North Hobart Oval

Source: All scores and statistics courtesy of the Hobart Mercury and Saturday Evening Mercury (SEM) publications.
