= 1951 TANFL season =

Australian rules football season

- Teams: Clarence Kangaroos; New Town Magpies; Hobart Tigers; New Norfolk Eagles; North Hobart Robins; Sandy Bay Seagulls
- Premiers: New Town
- Minor premiers: New Town

Attendance
- Matches played: 49
- Total attendance: 141,039 (2,878 per match)

The 1951 Tasmanian Australian National Football League (TANFL) premiership season was an Australian Rules football competition staged in Hobart, Tasmania over fifteen (15) roster rounds and four (4) finals series matches between 14 April and 6 October 1951.

== Participating Clubs ==
- Clarence District Football Club
- New Town District Football Club
- Hobart Football Club
- New Norfolk District Football Club
- North Hobart Football Club
- Sandy Bay Football Club

=== 1951 TANFL Club Coaches ===
- Les McClements (Clarence)
- Roy Cazaly (New Town)
- Bill Tonks (Hobart)
- Arthur Olliver (New Norfolk)
- Len McCankie (North Hobart)
- Bert Lucas (Sandy Bay)

=== TANFL Reserves Grand Final ===
- New Town 11.18 (84) v Nth Hobart 10.7 (67) – North Hobart Oval

=== TANFL Under-19's Grand Final ===
State Schools Old Boys Football Association (SSOBFA)

- Buckingham 17.7 (109) v North West 7.10 (52) – North Hobart Oval

Note: Buckingham affiliated to New Town, North West affiliated to North Hobart.

=== Intrastate Matches ===
Jubilee Shield (Saturday, 5 May 1951)

- TANFL 15.23 (113) v NTFA 13.14 (92) – Att: 8,886 at North Hobart Oval

Jubilee Shield (Saturday, 16 June 1951)

- TANFL 19.18 (132) v NWFU 13.16 (94) – Att: 4,056 at TCA Ground

Jubilee Shield (Saturday, 21 July 1951)

- TANFL 14.10 (94) v NTFA 10.19 (79) – Att: 11,300 at York Park

Jubilee Shield (Saturday, 18 August 1951)

- TANFL 23.12 (150) v NWFU 17.13 (115) – Att: 4,530 at West Park Oval

Inter-Association Match (Saturday, 21 July 1951)

- Huon FA 11.14 (80) v TANFL II 9.9 (63) – Att: 1,000 at Geeveston Oval

Inter-Association Match (Saturday, 18 August 1951)

- Huon FA 12.22 (94) v TANFL II 12.15 (87) – Att: 1,326 at TCA Ground

Inter-Association Match (Sunday, 19 August 1951)

- TANFL III 15.12 (102) v Queenstown FA 14.13 (97) – Att: N/A at Queenstown Oval

=== Interstate Matches ===
Exhibition Match (Saturday, 26 May 1951)

- Essendon 20.18 (138) v TANFL 13.4 (82) – Att: 7,973 at North Hobart Oval

Interstate Match (Saturday, 30 June 1951)

- Victorian FA 26.15 (171) v Tasmania 12.11 (83) – Att: 6,949 at North Hobart Oval

=== Leading Goalkickers: TANFL ===
- J.Cooper (Clarence) – 42
- Les McClements (Clarence) – 41
- W.Pepper (Hobart) – 36
- Rex Garwood (New Town) – 35
- R.Grattidge (Clarence) – 31

=== Medal Winners ===
- Rex Garwood (New Town) – William Leitch Medal
- R.Toulmin (Sandy Bay) – George Watt Medal (Reserves)
- Brian Cartwright (South East) – V.A Geard Medal (Under-19's)
- Max Griffiths (New Town) – Weller Arnold Medal (Best TANFL player in Intrastate match)

== 1951 TANFL Ladder ==
Pos	Team	Pld	W	L	D	PF	PA	PP	Pts
1	New Town	15	9	6	0	1419	1165	121.8	36
2	Hobart	15	9	6	0	1310	1231	106.4	36
3	North Hobart	15	9	6	0	1196	1173	102.0	36
4	New Norfolk	15	7	8	0	1225	1246	98.3	28
5	Clarence	15	6	7	2	1141	1319	86.5	28
6	Sandy Bay	15	3	10	2	1197	1364	87.8	16

=== Round 1 ===
(Saturday, 14 April 1951)

- Clarence 12.16 (88) v New Town 12.13 (85) – Att: 3,312 at North Hobart Oval
- Hobart 16.15 (111) v Sandy Bay 12.10 (82) – Att: 1,997 at TCA Ground
- Nth Hobart 12.8 (80) v New Norfolk 6.11 (47) – Att: 1,430 at Boyer Oval

=== Round 2 ===
(Saturday, 21 April 1951)

- Nth Hobart 8.10 (58) v Sandy Bay 7.12 (54) – Att: 2,847 at North Hobart Oval
- Hobart 13.9 (87) v New Town 10.15 (75) – Att: 1,811 at New Town Oval
- Clarence 11.11 (77) v New Norfolk 9.15 (69) – Att: 1,226 at Bellerive Oval

=== Round 3 ===
(Saturday, 28 April 1951)

- Clarence 12.11 (83) v Sandy Bay 12.9 (81) – Att: 3,674 at North Hobart Oval
- Nth Hobart 12.14 (86) v Hobart 10.13 (73) – Att: 2,659 at TCA Ground
- New Norfolk 14.13 (97) v New Town 11.12 (78) – Att: 1,983 at Boyer Oval

=== Round 4 ===
(Saturday, 12 May 1951)

- Hobart 17.15 (117) v New Norfolk 14.11 (95) – Att: 2,395 at North Hobart Oval
- Clarence 10.11 (71) v Nth Hobart 8.15 (63) – Att: 3,719 at TCA Ground
- New Town 16.14 (110) v Sandy Bay 9.8 (62) – Att: 2,028 at Queenborough Oval

=== Round 5 ===
(Saturday, 19 May 1951)

- Nth Hobart 10.12 (72) v New Town 9.10 (64) – Att: 3,873 at North Hobart Oval
- Clarence 17.9 (111) v Hobart 11.19 (85) – Att: 3,217 at Bellerive Oval
- New Norfolk 14.8 (92) v Sandy Bay 12.11 (83) – Att: 1,837 at Boyer Oval

=== Round 6 ===
(Saturday, 2 June 1951)

- Nth Hobart 15.17 (107) v New Norfolk 16.9 (105) – Att: 3,396 at North Hobart Oval
- Sandy Bay 17.26 (128) v Hobart 10.9 (69) – Att: 1,748 at Queenborough Oval
- New Town 16.24 (120) v Clarence 10.10 (70) – Att: 2,068 at Bellerive Oval

=== Round 7 ===
(Saturday, 9 June & Monday, 11 June 1951)

- Sandy Bay 12.12 (84) v Nth Hobart 7.10 (52) – Att: 4,318 at North Hobart Oval
- Clarence 13.9 (87) v New Norfolk 7.10 (52) – Att: 1,724 at Boyer Oval
- Hobart 9.15 (69) v New Town 8.10 (58) – Att: 5,040 at North Hobart Oval (Monday)

=== Round 8 ===
(Saturday, 23 June 1951)

- Nth Hobart 15.13 (103) v Hobart 11.15 (81) – Att: 2,518 at North Hobart Oval
- Sandy Bay 15.15 (105) v Clarence 16.9 (105) – Att: 2,388 at Queenborough Oval
- New Town 18.15 (123) v New Norfolk 12.12 (84) – Att: 1,455 at New Town Oval

=== Round 9 ===
(Saturday, 7 July 1951)

- New Town 10.14 (74) v Sandy Bay 10.8 (68) – Att: 3,732 at North Hobart Oval
- Nth Hobart 21.7 (133) v Clarence 10.7 (67) – Att: 1,774 at Bellerive Oval
- New Norfolk 7.8 (50) v Hobart 5.16 (46) – Att: 964 at Boyer Oval

=== Round 10 ===
(Saturday, 14 July 1951)

- New Norfolk 12.8 (80) v Sandy Bay 10.11 (71) – Att: 2,045 at North Hobart Oval
- Hobart 13.21 (99) v Clarence 11.11 (77) – Att: 1,267 at TCA Ground
- New Town 11.13 (79) v Nth Hobart 10.17 (77) – Att: 2,817 at New Town Oval

=== Round 11 ===
(Saturday, 28 July 1951)

- Hobart 12.16 (88) v Sandy Bay 5.12 (42) – Att: 2,145 at North Hobart Oval
- New Town 10.17 (77) v Clarence 4.10 (34) – Att: 1,759 at New Town Oval
- Nth Hobart 4.11 (35) v New Norfolk 3.12 (30) – Att: 1,245 at Boyer Oval

=== Round 12 ===
(Saturday, 4 August 1951)

- New Norfolk 14.9 (93) v Clarence 7.11 (53) – Att: 1,899 at North Hobart Oval
- Hobart 12.10 (82) v New Town 10.13 (73) – Att: 2,317 at TCA Ground
- Sandy Bay 16.10 (106) v Nth Hobart 10.16 (76) – Att: 1,608 at Queenborough Oval

=== Round 13 ===
(Saturday, 25 August 1951)

- New Town 17.13 (115) v New Norfolk 13.8 (86) – Att: 2,283 at North Hobart Oval
- Hobart 16.16 (112) v Nth Hobart 11.11 (77) – Att: 2,080 at TCA Ground
- Clarence 9.16 (70) v Sandy Bay 10.10 (70) – Att: 1,675 at Bellerive Oval

Note: Round postponed on 11 August due to inclement weather and poor ground conditions.

=== Round 14 ===
(Saturday, 1 September 1951)

- Nth Hobart 10.20 (80) v Clarence 10.16 (76) – Att: 2,777 at North Hobart Oval
- New Norfolk 13.24 (102) v Hobart 14.15 (99) – Att: 1,439 at TCA Ground
- New Town 21.27 (153) v Sandy Bay 13.8 (86) – Att: 1,531 at New Town Oval

=== Round 15 ===
(Saturday, 8 September 1951)

- New Town 19.11 (125) v Nth Hobart 16.7 (103) – Att: 4,849 at North Hobart Oval
- New Norfolk 21.17 (143) v Sandy Bay 11.9 (75) – Att: 934 at Queenborough Oval
- Hobart 12.21 (93) v Clarence 10.12 (72) – Att: 1,929 at Bellerive Oval

=== First Semi Final ===
(Saturday, 15 September 1951)

- Nth Hobart: 5.2 (32) | 7.10 (52) | 11.14 (80) | 14.20 (104)
- New Norfolk: 3.1 (19) | 7.1 (43) | 11.2 (68) | 14.4 (88)
- Attendance: 7,179 at North Hobart Oval

=== Second Semi Final ===
(Saturday, 22 September 1951)

- New Town: 5.4 (34) | 10.7 (67) | 11.15 (81) | 17.22 (124)
- Hobart: 2.1 (13) | 6.8 (44) | 9.8 (62) | 11.8 (74)
- Attendance: 7,979 at North Hobart Oval

=== Preliminary Final ===
(Saturday, 29 September 1951)

- Nth Hobart: 6.2 (38) | 7.6 (48) | 11.10 (76) | 12.14 (86)
- Hobart: 2.2 (14) | 7.4 (46) | 9.8 (62) | 10.13 (73)
- Attendance: 7,070 at North Hobart Oval

=== Grand Final ===
(Saturday, 6 October 1951)

- New Town: 7.2 (44) | 10.5 (65) | 15.12 (102) | 20.14 (134)
- Nth Hobart: 2.0 (12) | 5.5 (35) | 6.6 (42) | 9.9 (63)
- Attendance: 13,079 at North Hobart Oval

Source: All scores and statistics courtesy of the Hobart Mercury publication.
