= 1983 TANFL season =

Australian rules football season

- Teams: Clarence Kangaroos; Glenorchy Magpies; Hobart Tigers; New Norfolk Eagles; North Hobart Demons; Sandy Bay Seagulls
- Premiers: Glenorchy
- Minor premiers: Glenorchy; 7th minor premiership

Attendance
- Matches played: 65
- Total attendance: 169,650 (2,610 per match)

The 1983 Tasmanian Australian National Football League (TANFL) premiership season was an Australian rules football competition staged in Hobart, Tasmania over twenty (20) roster rounds and five (5) finals series matches (one was a replay due to a draw – in fact the only drawn game in the TANFL or TSL between 1981 and 1988) between 2 April and 17 September 1983. The League was known as the Winfield League under a commercial naming-rights sponsorship agreement with the Winfield tobacco company.

== Participating Clubs ==
- Clarence District Football Club
- Glenorchy District Football Club
- Hobart Football Club
- New Norfolk District Football Club
- North Hobart Football Club
- Sandy Bay Football Club

=== 1983 TANFL Club Coaches ===
- Noel Leary (Clarence)
- Garry Davidson (Glenorchy)
- Bruce Greenhill (Hobart)
- Robbie Dykes (New Norfolk)
- John Thurley (North Hobart)
- Paul Sproule (Sandy Bay)

=== Midas Mufflers League (Reserves) Grand Final ===
- Glenorchy 11.13 (79) v Hobart 8.14 (62) – North Hobart Oval

=== Dux Hotwater Systems League (Under-19's) Grand Final ===
- Sandy Bay 18.8 (116) v Hobart 12.17 (89) – North Hobart Oval

=== Leading Goalkickers: TANFL ===
- Wayne Fox (New Norfolk) – 135
- Garry Davidson (Glenorchy) – 61
- Chris Fagan (Sandy Bay) – 56
- Robert Dutton (Clarence) – 54

=== Medal Winners ===
- Tony Martyn (Sandy Bay) – William Leitch Medal
- Steve Sutton (New Norfolk) – George Watt Medal (Reserves)
- Robert Newton (Sandy Bay) – V.A Geard Medal (Under-19's)
- Michael Eiszele (New Norfolk) – D.R Plaister Medal (Under-17's)

=== Interstate Matches ===
Interstate Match (Sunday, 17 April 1983)

- Tasmania 15.24 (114) v ACT 15.9 (99) – Att: N/A at Manuka Oval, Canberra

Interstate Match (Saturday, 14 May 1983)

- Tasmania 26.21 (177) v New South Wales 13.9 (87) – Att: 5,524 at North Hobart Oval

Interstate Match (Saturday, 4 June 1983)

- Queensland 13.23 (101) v Tasmania 12.24 (96) – Att: 9,072 at North Hobart Oval

== Season summary ==
The 1983 Winfield League TANFL season saw Glenorchy as the standout team in a magnificent season for the Magpies.

In a season which saw the Final Four settled fairly early in the piece, Glenorchy finished six wins ahead of its nearest rivals New Norfolk (twelve wins) and Sandy Bay (twelve wins), with a woefully inconsistent Clarence rounding out the Four on ten wins.

Reigning Premier New Norfolk started its campaign by demolishing Hobart at Boyer on the opening day by 145-points and winning six of their opening seven matches including a 70-point demolition of Glenorchy at KGV to sit in top spot.

Glenorchy then went on a rampage winning their final fourteen roster matches to finish on top, New Norfolk began to lose form and suffer from injury concerns while Sandy Bay quietly set about winning matches to maintain second spot, New Norfolk found a purple patch winning four in a row, the last of which saw them booting a TANFL record score of 39.17 (251) against Clarence on 14 July at Boyer to hand the Roos their biggest defeat in their club's history, ironically, Clarence led New Norfolk by 24-points during the first quarter.

This set the stage for a titanic showdown against Glenorchy at KGV the following week where a crowd of almost 5,000 gathered and saw the classy Magpie outfit run out 22-point winners in a high-standard match.

Clarence's staggeringly inconsistent form saw them boot a club record score of 33.23 (221) against Hobart on 23 April at Bellerive, but would suffer from the above-mentioned 173-point loss later in the season to New Norfolk, then two weeks later defeat Hobart by 90-points.

Meanwhile, at the other end of the table, North Hobart and Hobart occupied the bottom two places and despite being competitive in many matches, were well behind the top four teams in skill and experience, North Hobart were still sitting in bottom position with one quarter to go of the roster season but Hobart were the victim of a new TANFL record quarter score of 16.3 (99) in the final quarter against Glenorchy to suffer a 103-point loss and take the wooden spoon by 1.13%.

The First Semi Final saw Sandy Bay and Clarence fight out a thrilling draw, the replay the following week was a curtain raiser to the Second Semi Final between Glenorchy and New Norfolk with almost 11,000 attending an impressively high-standard double header with Sandy Bay edging out the Roos in a thriller and the Second Semi Final saw an incredible fifty goals scored, New Norfolk's losing score of 24.10 (154) was another TANFL record.

New Norfolk would run all over a tired Sandy Bay by 53-points in the Preliminary Final to book a spot in the Grand Final against the all-conquering Magpie machine.

A crowd of almost 18,000 attended the Grand Final to see if New Norfolk under Captain/Coach Robbie Dykes could go back-to-back or whether the Magpies under Captain/Coach Garry Davidson could erase the dreadful memories of six Grand Finals and one Preliminary Final loss stretching back to 1976.

Glenorchy answering the question in emphatic fashion to lead late in the match by over 100-points, the Eagles getting two late goals to reduce the margin to 92-points at siren time, the Magpies winning their sixteenth consecutive match in taking their first title since 1975.

Under ground rationalisation plans instigated by the TANFL, both Hobart and Sandy Bay Football Clubs would play their home fixtures this season at KGV Football Park and North Hobart Oval respectively after being removed from their home grounds by the League at the end of the 1982 season.

== 1983 TANFL Ladder ==
Pos	Team	Pld	W	L	D	PF	PA	PP	Pts
1	Glenorchy	20	18	2	0	2616	1956	133.7	72
2	New Norfolk	20	12	8	0	2413	1857	129.9	48
3	Sandy Bay	20	12	8	0	1990	1813	109.8	48
4	Clarence	20	10	10	0	2160	2159	100.0	40
5	North Hobart	20	4	16	0	1870	2556	73.2	16
6	Hobart	20	4	16	0	1810	2513	72.0	16

=== Round 1 ===
(Saturday, 2 April & Monday 4 April 1983)

- Glenorchy 21.14 (140) v Clarence 10.13 (73) – Att: 3,113 at KGV Football Park
- New Norfolk 30.17 (197) v Hobart 7.10 (52) – Att: 1,385 at Boyer Oval
- Sandy Bay 22.19 (151) v Nth Hobart 11.11 (77) – Att: 3,061 at North Hobart Oval (Monday)

=== Round 2 ===
(Saturday, 9 April 1983)

- Glenorchy 20.15 (135) v Sandy Bay 16.12 (108) – Att: 2,620 at North Hobart Oval
- Hobart 21.16 (142) v Nth Hobart 8.22 (70) – Att: 1,124 at KGV Football Park
- New Norfolk 23.15 (153) v Clarence 11.10 (76) – Att: 2,358 at Bellerive Oval

=== Round 3 ===
(Saturday, 16 April 1983)

- Clarence 21.16 (142) v Nth Hobart 13.7 (85) – Att: 2,069 at North Hobart Oval
- Hobart 12.24 (96) v Sandy Bay 9.16 (70) – Att: 1,393 at KGV Football Park
- New Norfolk 20.21 (141) v Glenorchy 10.11 (71) – Att: 1,945 at Boyer Oval

=== Round 4 ===
(Saturday, 23rd & Monday, 25 April 1983)

- Glenorchy 29.25 (199) v Nth Hobart 14.16 (100) – Att: 2,304 at KGV Football Park
- Clarence 33.23 (221) v Hobart 8.13 (61) – Att: 2,614 at Bellerive Oval
- Sandy Bay 10.9 (69) v New Norfolk 4.8 (32) – Att: 1,462 at North Hobart Oval (Monday)

=== Round 5 ===
(Saturday, 30 April 1983)

- Clarence 17.16 (118) v Sandy Bay 9.16 (70) – Att: 2,483 at North Hobart Oval
- Glenorchy 18.14 (122) v Hobart 15.7 (97) – Att: 1,966 at KGV Football Park
- New Norfolk 12.21 (93) v Nth Hobart 8.11 (59) – Att: 1,612 at Boyer Oval

=== Round 6 ===
(Saturday, 7 May 1983)

- Sandy Bay 18.10 (118) v Nth Hobart 12.10 (82) – Att: 1,722 at North Hobart Oval
- New Norfolk 16.23 (119) v Hobart 11.9 (75) – Att: 1,486 at KGV Football Park
- Clarence 17.21 (123) v Glenorchy 10.14 (74) – Att: 3,022 at Bellerive Oval

=== Round 7 ===
(Saturday, 21 May 1983)

- Nth Hobart 15.16 (106) v Hobart 13.17 (95) – Att: 1,648 at North Hobart Oval
- Glenorchy 17.15 (117) v Sandy Bay 13.20 (98) – Att: 2,096 at KGV Football Park
- New Norfolk 18.13 (121) v Clarence 15.13 (103) – Att: 2,564 at Boyer Oval

=== Round 8 ===
(Saturday, 28 May 1983)

- Sandy Bay 18.19 (127) v Hobart 15.15 (105) – Att: 1,352 at North Hobart Oval
- Glenorchy 21.17 (143) v New Norfolk 16.11 (107) – Att: 2,863 at KGV Football Park
- Clarence 17.20 (122) v Nth Hobart 15.20 (110) – Att: 1,916 at Bellerive Oval

=== Round 9 ===
(Saturday, 11 June 1983)

- Glenorchy 28.13 (181) v North Hobart 12.15 (87) – Att: 2,076 at North Hobart Oval
- Clarence 15.18 (108) v Hobart 14.18 (102) – Att: 1,254 at KGV Football Park
- Sandy Bay 15.13 (103) v New Norfolk 14.13 (97) – Att: 1,468 at Boyer Oval

=== Round 10 ===
(Monday, 13 June 1983)

- New Norfolk 24.11 (155) v Nth Hobart 16.12 (108) – Att: 1,282 at North Hobart Oval
- Glenorchy 14.15 (99) v Hobart 10.15 (75) – Att: 1,420 at KGV Football Park
- Sandy Bay 17.13 (115) v Clarence 12.15 (87) – Att: 1,847 at Bellerive Oval

=== Round 11 ===
(Saturday, 18 June 1983)

- Sandy Bay 13.19 (97) v Nth Hobart 14.7 (91) – Att: 1,695 at North Hobart Oval
- Glenorchy 22.14 (146) v Clarence 10.14 (74) – Att: 2,981 at KGV Football Park
- Hobart 24.7 (151) v New Norfolk 9.12 (66) – Att: 1,282 at Boyer Oval

=== Round 12 ===
(Saturday, 25 June 1983)

- Glenorchy 10.9 (69) v Sandy Bay 7.16 (58) – Att: 1,928 at North Hobart Oval
- Nth Hobart 18.15 (123) v Hobart 11.14 (80) – Att: 992 at KGV Football Park
- Clarence 17.14 (116) v New Norfolk 13.16 (94) – Att: 1,598 at Bellerive Oval

=== Round 13 ===
(Saturday, 2 July 1983)

- Nth Hobart 10.7 (67) v Clarence 7.12 (54) – Att: 1,757 at North Hobart Oval
- Sandy Bay 13.12 (90) v Hobart 7.11 (53) – Att: 1,102 at KGV Football Park
- Glenorchy 15.7 (97) v New Norfolk 11.19 (85) – Att: 1,543 at Boyer Oval

=== Round 14 ===
(Saturday, 9 July 1983)

- New Norfolk 19.12 (126) v Sandy Bay 9.8 (62) – Att: 1,986 at North Hobart Oval
- Glenorchy 18.17 (125) v Nth Hobart 10.10 (70) – Att: 2,391 at KGV Football Park
- Clarence 20.20 (140) v Hobart 5.9 (39) – Att: 1,562 at Bellerive Oval

=== Round 15 ===
(Saturday, 16 July 1983)

- Clarence 16.10 (106) v Sandy Bay 11.19 (85) – Att: 2,411 at North Hobart Oval
- Glenorchy 17.14 (116) v Hobart 13.12 (90) – Att: 1,568 at KGV Football Park
- New Norfolk 22.12 (144) v Nth Hobart 13.13 (91) – Att: 1,404 at Boyer Oval

=== Round 16 ===
(Saturday, 23 July 1983)

- Sandy Bay 16.17 (113) v Nth Hobart 10.8 (68) – Att: 1,734 at North Hobart Oval
- New Norfolk 17.12 (114) v Hobart 13.11 (89) – Att: 1,209 at KGV Football Park
- Glenorchy 14.13 (97) v Clarence 10.11 (71) – Att: 2,700 at Bellerive Oval

=== Round 17 ===
(Saturday, 30 July 1983)

- Hobart 16.16 (112) v Nth Hobart 14.17 (101) – Att: 1,403 at North Hobart Oval
- Glenorchy 20.17 (137) v Sandy Bay 20.14 (134) – Att: 2,457 at KGV Football Park
- New Norfolk 39.17 (251) v Clarence 11.12 (78) – Att: 1,985 at Boyer Oval *

Note: New Norfolk kicks the TANFL record score which lasted until 1995, it was also Clarence Football Club's largest ever defeat.

=== Round 18 ===
(Saturday, 6 August 1983)

- Sandy Bay 16.11 (107) v Hobart 10.14 (74) – Att: 1,192 at North Hobart Oval
- Glenorchy 18.13 (121) v New Norfolk 14.16 (100) – Att: 4,946 at KGV Football Park
- Nth Hobart 16.29 (125) v Clarence 12.17 (89) – Att: 1,604 at Bellerive Oval

=== Round 19 ===
(Saturday, 13 August 1983)

- Glenorchy 30.20 (200) v Nth Hobart 22.11 (143) – Att: 2,862 at North Hobart Oval
- Clarence 29.16 (190) v Hobart 14.16 (100) – Att: 1,344 at KGV Football Park
- Sandy Bay 14.7 (91) v New Norfolk 10.14 (74) – Att: 2,189 at Boyer Oval

=== Round 20 ===
(Saturday, 20 August 1983)

- New Norfolk 21.18 (144) v Nth Hobart 15.17 (107) – Att: 2,053 at North Hobart Oval
- Glenorchy 34.21 (225) v Hobart 18.14 (122) – Att: 1,660 at KGV Football Park *
- Sandy Bay 18.16 (124) v Clarence 10.9 (69) – Att: 2,267 at Bellerive Oval

Note: Glenorchy Football Club kicks their all-time record score.

=== First Semi Final ===
(Saturday, 27 August 1983)

- Sandy Bay: 2.4 (16) | 6.8 (44) | 10.15 (75) | 15.16 (106)
- Clarence: 5.2 (32) | 9.5 (59) | 14.6 (90) | 16.10 (106)
- Attendance: 5,230 at North Hobart Oval

=== First Semi Final Replay ===
(Saturday, 3 September 1983)

- Sandy Bay: 3.8 (26) | 10.11 (71) | 14.14 (98) | 15.18 (108)
- Clarence: 3.2 (20) | 8.7 (55) | 10.14 (74) | 14.17 (101)
- Attendance: 10,921 at North Hobart Oval (Double-Header)

=== Second Semi Final ===
(Saturday, 3 September 1983)

- Glenorchy: 8.6 (54) | 15.7 (97) | 18.9 (117) | 26.11 (167)
- New Norfolk: 5.2 (32) | 10.5 (65) | 21.8 (134) | 24.10 (154)
- Attendance: 10,921 at North Hobart Oval (Double-Header)

=== Preliminary Final ===
(Saturday, 10 September 1983)

- New Norfolk: 8.2 (50) | 11.4 (70) | 15.7 (97) | 23.11 (149)
- Sandy Bay: 1.0 (6) | 10.2 (62) | 11.5 (71) | 15.6 (96)
- Attendance: 7,348 at North Hobart Oval

=== Grand Final ===
(Saturday, 17 September 1983)

- Glenorchy: 8.6 (54) | 12.11 (83) | 19.16 (130) | 28.19 (187)
- New Norfolk: 2.3 (15) | 7.5 (47) | 11.6 (72) | 14.11 (95)
- Attendance: 17,900 at North Hobart Oval

Source: All scores and statistics courtesy of the Hobart Mercury and Saturday Evening Mercury (SEM) publications.
