= KGV Oval =

Sports stadium in Hobart, Tasmania

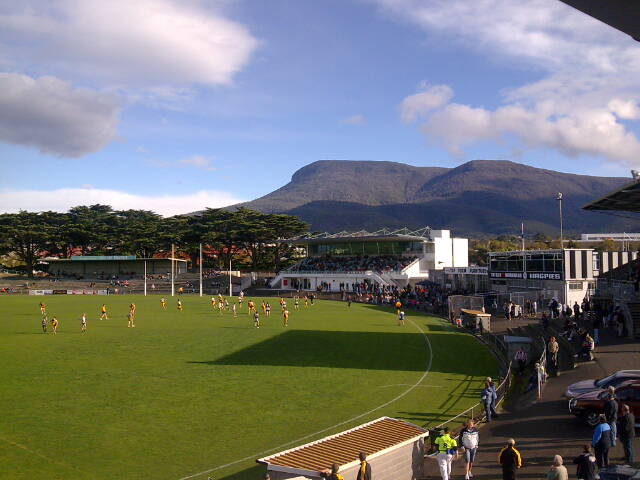

- Location within Hobart
- Location: Glenorchy, Tasmania
- Coordinates: 42°49′53″S 147°16′37″E
- Owner: Glenorchy City Council
- Operator: Glenorchy City Council
- Capacity: 18,000
- Surface: Grass

Construction
- Opened: 1950

Tenants
- Glenorchy Football Club – Tasmanian State League, Southern Football League, Southern Tasmanian Junior Football League; Glenorchy Cricket Club – TCA; Southern Football League (HQ)

KGV Oval is a multi-purpose sports stadium located in Glenorchy, Tasmania. It serves as the home ground for the Glenorchy Football Club and the Southern Football League, and it is also used by the Glenorchy Cricket Club.

The oval has a seating capacity of 18,000, making it the third-largest Australian rules football venue in Tasmania after North Hobart Oval and UTAS Stadium.

KGV Oval is named in honour of King George V, and is located less than 1 kilometre from the Glenorchy CBD, approximately 7 kilometres (4.3 mi) from Hobart.

KGV Oval should not be confused with KGV Park, an adjoining soccer venue that is the base of Football Tasmania and home to Tasmania’s top soccer competitions.

== History ==
=== 1950s: Establishment and early years ===
Construction of the new King George V Memorial Oval took place over a number of years between 1949 and 1952 by the Glenorchy Municipal Council, and was completed in stages due to a lack of available funding.
Despite being opened for use by 1953, the ground did not have a major tenant with Glenorchy Rovers opting to remain at Eady Street as did the Glenorchy District Cricket Club.
On 14 October 1953, a meeting tabled between Glenorchy Rovers, TANFL club, New Town and the Glenorchy Municipal Council to discuss the possibility of either club entering into a lease agreement with the Council failed to achieve an outcome, Rovers later moved to KGV and began playing there in 1954.
After some years of discussion, ultimately New Town Football Club outgrew their home ground at the New Town Oval and after completing the 1956 TANFL Season, moved base to KGV in early 1957.
On 8 April 1957, Glenorchy Football Club, formed through a merger between New Town and Glenorchy Rovers was ratified by the TANFL and became the main tenant of the ground, and KGV Oval quickly became a key venue for Australian rules football in Tasmania. It also hosted the local Glenorchy Cricket Club and other sports teams. Early development included the construction of basic spectator facilities, such as grandstands and terracing.

=== 1980s: Expansion and concerts ===
In the 1980s, KGV Oval underwent significant redevelopment, including the construction of grassy spectator banks and terracing. The ground was considered as a possible central venue for the Tasmanian Football League (TFL), but plans for it to become the official home of the TFL never came to fruition.

During this period, KGV Oval also became a major concert venue in Hobart. In 1987, the Australian Made concert series event featured performances by INXS, Jimmy Barnes, Divinyls, The Saints, Models, The Triffids, I'm Talking, and Mental As Anything. This event is particularly notable for INXS performing "Good Times" live for the first time with Jimmy Barnes.

In 1986, Dire Straits performed two consecutive nights at KGV Oval, attracting crowds of over 20,000 and 18,000 respectively. Other notable acts include Stevie Wonder, and Dolly Parton and Kenny Rogers performed a joint concert at KGV in the mid-1980s.

However, KGV Oval’s status as a key entertainment venue in Tasmania was short-lived. Following the completion of the Derwent Entertainment Centre (DEC) in 1989, bookers began favouring the newer, indoor venue for international touring acts. KGV Oval was further hindered by its location within a residential area, whereas the DEC, located in a dedicated sporting precinct, was able to host events later in the evening, making it a more practical choice for large-scale concerts and entertainment events.

=== Fire and rebuilding of the Cresswell-Beakley Stand (2007-2010) ===
In October 2007, the Cresswell-Beakley Stand, which had been a staple of KGV Oval since 1962, was destroyed by fire. Local youths were suspected to have started the blaze, causing over $600,000 in damage. The stand was noted for its unique curved wooden ceiling, designed to reduce bird droppings on the seating below. A new, modern version of the stand was completed in 2010, featuring improved seating, function rooms, corporate facilities, and accessibility enhancements.

In 2009, the Southern Football League (Tasmania) (SFL) announced it would relocate its offices and host its major finals at KGV Oval starting in the 2010 season. As part of the redevelopment, the Tasmanian government provided funding for new television-quality lights and an electric scoreboard. The new lights were inaugurated during the 2011 TSL season opening match, which drew a record crowd of 8,480 spectators.

=== 2010s: KGV Sports and Community Precinct ===
In the 2010s, the KGV Sports and Community Precinct Master Plan was developed by the Glenorchy City Council, aiming to transform KGV Oval into a multi-functional community space. This plan included the construction of the KGV Sports and Community Centre, which opened in 2015 and was designed by Jaws Architects. The centre now hosts a variety of community and sporting events and is a hub for local engagement.

=== Recent events ===
KGV Oval continues to be used for high-profile events, including hosting the offices and finals of the Southern Football League. The venue remains an important asset to the Glenorchy community, both as a sports ground and an entertainment venue.

== Facilities ==
KGV Oval has a large playing surface measuring 160 by 134 metres (525 ft × 440 ft), which makes it one of the largest football grounds in Tasmania. The venue includes two main grandstands: the rebuilt Cresswell-Beakley Stand and the Anfield Street Stand, which was constructed in 1981. The Glenorchy Football Club's clubrooms, located between the two stands, were built in 1968 and feature change rooms, offices, a social club, and a kiosk.

On the broadcast wing near the river end of the oval is the Glenorchy Cricket Club's clubhouse and cricket nets.

== Attendance ==
KGV Oval has hosted several high-attendance events, particularly for Tasmanian State League and Southern Football League finals.

No.	Date	Event	Teams	Sport	Attendance
1	2 April 2011	Tasmanian State League	Glenorchy vs. Clarence	Australian rules football	8,480
2	25 September 2011	SFL Grand Final	New Norfolk vs. Kingborough	Australian rules football	6,907

== Access and transport ==
KGV Oval is centrally located in Glenorchy, easily accessible from Hobart via public transport. Metro Tasmania buses service the area, with routes connecting Glenorchy to Hobart City and other northern suburbs. There is limited parking at the venue, and during major events, nearby streets and parking lots are utilised by attendees.
