= Queenborough Oval =

Sports ground in Hobart, Tasmania

Coordinates: 42.904°S 147.333°E

- "The Bay"
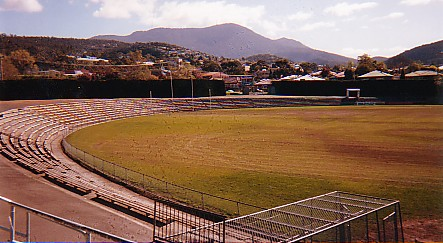
- Interactive map of Queenborough Oval
- Location: Sandy Bay, Tasmania
- Owner: Hobart City Council
- Operator: Hobart City Council
- Capacity: 8,000
- Surface: Grass

Construction
- Opened: 1916

Tenants
- Hutchins Football Club - Old Scholars Football Association; South Hobart/Sandy Bay Cricket Club - TCA

Queenborough Oval is the home headquarters of the Hutchins Old Boys Football Club and the South Hobart/Sandy Bay Cricket Club. The ground is a former Tasmanian Football League venue, being the former home of the Sandy Bay Football Club (now defunct) from 1945 to 1997. After the demise of Sandy Bay in 1997, Hutchins moved to the ground during the 1998 season after vacating their former home ground of 43 years (Hutchins War Memorial Oval) just up the street from Queenborough. It is located on the corner of Nelson Road and Peel Street Sandy Bay, 5 km (3.1 mi) south of the Hobart CBD.

== History ==
Queenborough Oval was originally part of the Queenborough Regional Cemetery, a 12-acre (49,000 m^{2}) site opened in 1873 and owned by Sandy Bay businessmen George Luckman and Stephen Large who purchased the site for £280 as a means of good business enterprise so that the residents in the Queenborough area could bury their dead some distance from their homes.
The cemetery originally occupied the site from the edge of Sandy Bay Road (across from where Wrest Point Hotel Casino stands today), extending the whole way up the hills of Nelson Road to the edge Churchill Avenue (where The Hutchins School exists today).

By 1913 the Queenborough Cemetery Company had run out of money to maintain the cemetery and the entire site lay derelict until the Hobart City Council purchased the site in late-1915 through an Act of Parliament and began building sports grounds in 1916 in the lower portion off Sandy Bay Road (now known as Lower Queenborough) and the current Queenborough Oval above that on the corner of Peel Street, with the remainder of the cemetery being used until it was closed in 1934 and was later dismantled in 1961 for the construction of The Hutchins School site. Across the road from the Peel Street end of Queenborough Oval, the headstones of many of the dead still remain in a small, well maintained remembrance garden.

Football at Queenborough began in 1916 with the ground being the new home to the Sandy Bay Rovers Football Club that played in the Queenborough Football Association at that time, prior to that, Rovers played at Lord's Paddock off Lord Street, Sandy Bay. Sandy Bay Rovers became defunct prior to World War Two and after the four-year break in football due to the War, the most notable tenant of the ground, Sandy Bay Football Club was formed in January 1945 and made the ground its home in the Tasmanian Football League. The quaint ground received some modifications in 1965 when a grandstand (later named the Palfreyman Stand after the Sandy Bay legend) was built and the clubroom building adjacent and terracing at the Peel Street end was also built.

Queenborough Oval was well known in Tasmanian football for the long row of hedges which extended along the perimeter fence along the Nelson Road side of the ground and the entire perimeter fence at the Peel Street end, known as "The Hedge End", the hedges were often inhabited by scores of children on matchdays playing in them.

Despite such a picturesque setting Queenborough Oval's shortcomings as a major football ground in TFL football were becoming obvious by the late 1970s with respect to the lack of room to be able to extend and further develop the ground for the future.

By 1980 The Mercury newspaper were headlining calls for Sandy Bay to vacate Queenborough Oval and move to North Hobart Oval or move to the Kingborough Region to the south of Hobart, due to the ground's small playing surface and somewhat inadequate spectator and player facilities, as poor crowds continued to dog the venue. These calls were to continue until Sandy Bay finally moved away to play at North Hobart Oval in 1983, but then moved back to Queenborough part-time for the next two seasons before returning permanently in 1986. By the early 1990s The Mercury once again had Queenborough in the firing line, with an article titled "Queenborough Is The Pits!" appearing in 1990, Sandy Bay then moved back and forth between North Hobart Oval and Queenborough Oval on several occasions until Sandy Bay's demise at the end of the 1997 TFL Statewide League season.

The final TFL match staged at Queenborough Oval was on Sunday, 27 July 1997 where a crowd of 1,333 people saw Sandy Bay host Glenorchy to which the Bay were handed a 101-point defeat, 21.13 (139) to 5.8 (38) by Glenorchy in a sad end to their 53-year history at the ground.

On 25 May 1968, the touring New Zealand All Blacks, in their second match on tour, played Tasmania at Queenborough Oval, winning 74–0.

The All Blacks, captained by Sir Brian Lochore, later coach of the first team to win the Rugby World Cup in 1987, scored 18 tries that day of which only seven were converted. The captain of the Tasmanian Rugby Team was John Donaldson of the university-Associates Club.

Queenborough also hosted an international soccer friendly between Tasmania and touring Welsh club Cardiff City on 8 June 1968, Cardiff won the match 5–1 in front of a crowd of 4,500.

Today, Queenborough Oval is now used by Hutchins Old Boys Football Club in the Old Scholars Football Association, who moved from their former Hutchins Memorial Oval base to Queenborough in 1998.

The ground has hosted finals in that competition over several years, along with STJFL football as well as being the home to the South Hobart/Sandy Bay Sharks in the Tasmanian Cricket Association
