= Boyer Oval =

Tasmanian football ground

Coordinates: 42°46′29.25″S 147°03′26.7″E

- "The Valley of Love"
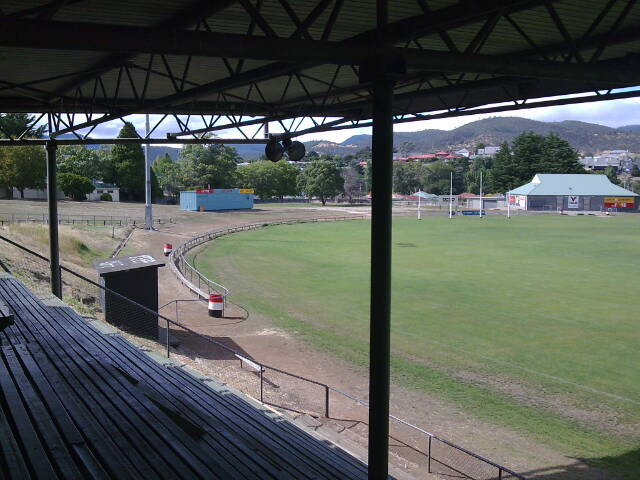
- Interactive map of Boyer Oval
- Location: New Norfolk, Tasmania
- Owner: Derwent Valley Council
- Operator: Derwent Valley Council
- Capacity: 5,000
- Surface: Grass

Construction
- Opened: 1945

Tenants
- New Norfolk District Football Club - Southern Football League; Molesworth Cricket Club - Southern Cricket Association

Boyer Oval is the home headquarters of the New Norfolk District Football Club and the Molesworth Cricket Club.
The ground is a former Tasmanian Football League venue, being the host venue of 825 official TFL matches for New Norfolk (and one game for Hobart in 1974) in TFL football from 1947 to 1999 and from 2000 it became a venue for SFL football when New Norfolk were demoted from the Statewide League.
It is located on First Avenue and has a back entrance on Back River Road (behind the Derwent Valley Sports Bar – the club's former licensed clubrooms) at New Norfolk, 38 kilometres north-west of the Hobart CBD.

== History ==
Boyer Oval at New Norfolk was built by the former Australian Newsprint Mills Limited (ANM) in 1945 and was built with a large amount of technical input from experts from the Victorian Football League (now Australian Football League). It was built for the people of New Norfolk and the Derwent Valley to the same playing surface size as the Melbourne Cricket Ground and was intended to be used for Australian Rules football, soccer, cricket, cycling and athletics with a view to expansion in future years when needed. Boyer Oval also hosted boxing events and community concerts for many years and was an extremely well utilised venue in its earlier years. The ground was named after ANM Limited's Boyer Newsprint Mill, located at Boyer, 6 km south of New Norfolk.

The main grandstand at the ground is the L.W.Hepper Stand, named after New Norfolk president Les Hepper (1909–2009) who presided over the Eagles from 1957–1974, and was built in 1961 and for many years had a fearsome reputation amongst Tasmanian football fans for the highly partisan supporters that used to pack the stand each match.
The stand was condemned in 2021 after the seating began to buckle and collapse, the seating was removed and remains empty as of 2024 with only a standing area at the rear still in use.
At the end of 1997, the Derwent Valley Council erected brand new changerooms to replace the former wooden ones (believed to have been wooden huts from a former Hydro village in the Central Highlands) which had stood behind the First Avenue end goals since the ground was opened.

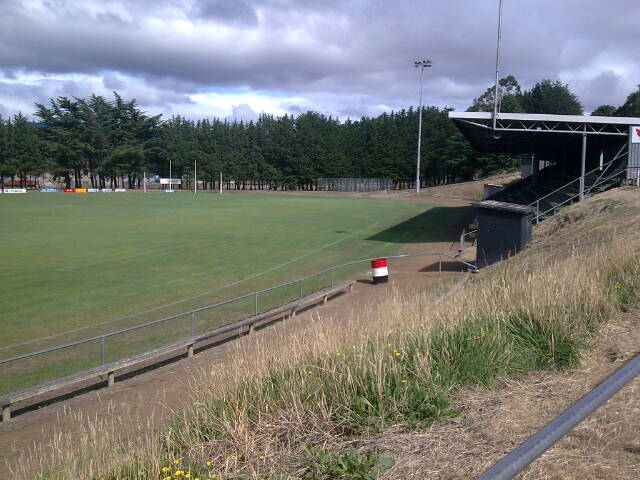
View of Boyer Oval from the Hepper Stand side looking towards the Back River Road (Queenstown) end.

New Norfolk played their first match at Boyer Oval in 1946 in the Southern District Football Association, prior to that they played at Lachlan Park in the grounds of the old Royal Derwent Hospital complex.
The ground holds the distinction of having the second highest - 39.17 (251) by New Norfolk on 14 July 1983 - and fourth highest - 38.15 (243) by North Hobart on 5 August 1989 - scores kicked in TFL history on it.
In 1972, the New Norfolk District Football Club opened its own licensed clubrooms in the rear-carpark on Back River Road, approximately 200m behind the Queenstown end goal.

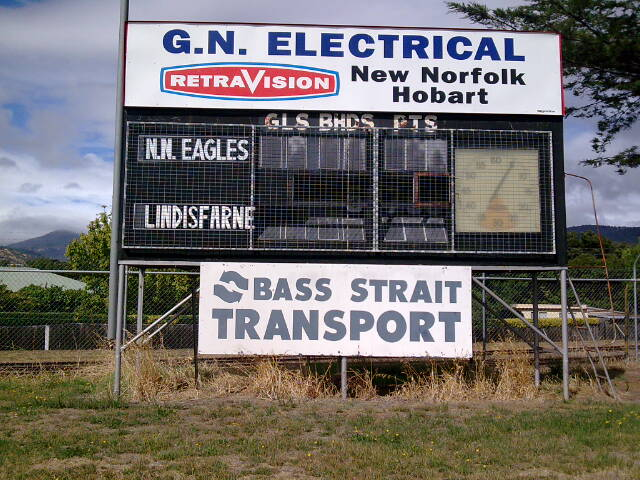
Old main scoreboard at Boyer Oval, Has been since replaced with an up to date LED scoreboard.

The final Tasmanian Football League match to be staged at Boyer Oval was on Saturday, 21 August 1999 between New Norfolk (then known as Derwent Eagles) and North Launceston (then known as Northern Bombers) resulting in an 81-point win to the Bombers. The record crowd for a match at Boyer Oval is 4,710 recorded on 25 April 1964 between New Norfolk and Clarence. Today, the ground is continuing to be used by the New Norfolk District Football Club and Molesworth Cricket Club in their related competitions and has unfortunately been a magnet for vandalism in the town over the past several years and has fallen into a gradual state of disrepair due to a lack of funding to conduct repairs.

Late 2024 construction and work has begun on building a new pavilion, changerooms, parking improvements, repairing and improving the existing L.W.Hepper grandstand which has been long due. This is from a government $5 Million dollar grant to improve local sports facilities in the region which includes creating new soccer facilities at Tynwald park.
