= Attendance =

Presence of a person at a location for a scheduled event

Attendance is the concept of people, individually or as a group, appearing at a location for a previously scheduled event. Measuring attendance is a significant concern for many organizations, which can use such information to gauge the effectiveness of their efforts and to plan for future efforts.

== In education and work ==
In both classroom settings and workplaces, attendance may be mandatory. Poor attendance by a student in a class may affect their grades or other evaluations. Poor attendance may also reflect problems in a student's personal situation, and is an indicator that "students are not developing the knowledge and skills needed for later success".

For students in elementary school and high school, laws may require compulsory attendance, while students at higher levels of education may be penalized by professors or the institution for lack of attendance. Daycare providers tend to use iPad applications to take attendance throughout the day or when the children are move locations.

== In entertainment and social settings ==
In entertainment and commercial settings, attendance is often measured to determine the success of an event as a form of entertainment. Attendance at sporting events is particularly well examined, as sports teams with attendance too low to generate revenue may be shut down or relocated. "Attendance figures, average attendance, and percentage of stadium capacity filled are important indicators of fan support and how much advertisers and partners are willing to invest in a team". Attendance of other events, such as films, plays, and other performances, may similarly determine whether the production was a commercial success, and may influence the determination to make sequels or similar works. The expectation of certain levels of attendance at a particular kind of event is a significant factor in determining the seating capacity to be built into venues constructed for such events, and the distribution of events or performances. If an event repeats, as with a series of games in a sports season or performances of a concert or show, "the aim though should be to spread attendance across less popular days, or extend performances over a longer period of time".

Attendance is also measured and reported for a wide variety of other social events ranging from political rallies to religious services.

== Attendance management ==
Attendance management is the act of managing attendance or presence in a work setting to minimize loss due to employee downtime.

Attendance control has traditionally been approached using time clocks, timesheets, and time tracking software, but attendance management goes beyond this to provide a working environment which maximizes and motivates employee attendance. Recently it has become possible to collect attendance data automatically through using real-time location systems, which also allow for cross-linking between attendance data and performance. Organizations must deal with compliance issues, payroll errors, and more with a reliable employee attendance management system. Organizations can save time, reduce administrative work, maintain accurate attendance records, and eliminate process bottlenecks by replacing paper-based timesheets with attendance management software. Attendance management takes place in all educational campuses be they university, college or school.

== See also ==
- List of most-attended concerts
- List of most-attended concert tours
- List of sports attendance figures
- List of attendance figures at domestic professional sports leagues
