= 1969 TANFL season =

Australian football season

- Teams: Clarence Kangaroos; Glenorchy Magpies; Hobart Tigers; New Norfolk Eagles; North Hobart Robins/Demons; Sandy Bay Seagulls
- Premiers: Nth Hobart
- Minor premiers: Nth Hobart

Attendance
- Matches played: 61
- Total attendance: 242,765 (3,980 per match)

The 1969 Tasmanian Australian National Football League (TANFL) premiership season was an Australian Rules football competition staged in Hobart, Tasmania over nineteen (19) roster rounds and four (4) finals series matches between 5 April and 13 September 1969.

== Participating Clubs ==
- Clarence District Football Club
- Glenorchy District Football Club
- Hobart Football Club
- New Norfolk District Football Club
- North Hobart Football Club
- Sandy Bay Football Club

Note: North Hobart officially changed their emblem from the Robins to Demons on 1 May 1969, previously they had also been referred to colloquially as the Redlegs.

=== 1969 TANFL Club Coaches ===
- John Bingley (Clarence)
- Graeme Gahan (Glenorchy)
- Burnie Payne (Hobart)
- Trevor Leo (New Norfolk)
- John Devine (North Hobart)
- Ray Giblett (Sandy Bay)

=== TANFL Reserves Grand Final ===
- Sandy Bay 15.15 (105) v Glenorchy 12.9 (81) – North Hobart Oval

=== TANFL Under-19's Grand Final ===
- Glenorchy. (Scores unavailable)

=== TANFL Under-17's Grand Final ===
- Clarence 10.9 (69) d New Norfolk 8.10 (58) – North Hobart Oval

=== State Preliminary Final ===
(Saturday, 20 September 1969)

- Nth Hobart 15.15 (105) v Latrobe 11.13 (79) – Att: 7,999 at Devonport Oval

Note: North Hobart (TANFL guernsey) and Latrobe (NWFU guernsey) wore alternate strips due to a guernsey clash.

=== State Grand Final ===
(Saturday, 27 September 1969)

- Nth Hobart: 4.3 (27) | 10.11 (71) | 16.15 (111) | 26.20 (176)
- Launceston: 2.3 (15) | 3.6 (24) | 3.12 (30) | 6.13 (49)
- Attendance: 10,371 at York Park

=== Intrastate Matches ===
Jubilee Shield (Saturday, 26 April 1969)

- NWFU 21.17 (143) v TANFL 16.15 (111) – Att: 8,114 at West Park Oval

Jubilee Shield (Saturday, 24 May 1969)

- TANFL 15.17 (107) v NTFA 9.9 (63) – Att: 13,256 at North Hobart Oval

=== Interstate Matches ===
See: 1969 Australian Football Carnival

Match One (Saturday, 7 June 1969)

- Victoria 23.21 (159) v Tasmania 10.26 (86) – Att: 40,150 at Adelaide Oval

Match Three (Wednesday, 11 June 1969)

- South Australia 21.22 (148) v Tasmania 13.12 (90) – Att: N/A at Adelaide Oval

Match Five (Saturday, 14 June 1969)

- Western Australia 28.24 (192) v Tasmania 12.7 (79) – Att: 51,000 at Adelaide Oval

=== Leading Goalkickers: TANFL ===
- John Marshall (Nth Hobart) – 50
- Brent Palfreyman (Sandy Bay) – 48
- Kevin King (Clarence) – 47
- Bob Smith (Nth Hobart) – 42

=== Medal Winners ===
- Roger Steele (Sandy Bay) – William Leitch Medal
- L.Pilkington (Sandy Bay) – George Watt Medal (Reserves)
- Robbie Dykes (Claremont) – V.A Geard Medal (Under-19's)
- Burnie Payne (Hobart) – Weller Arnold Medal (Best player in Intrastate matches)

== 1969 TANFL Ladder ==
Pos	Team	Pld	W	L	D	PF	PA	PP	Pts
1	North Hobart	19	15	4	0	1869	1684	111.0	60
2	Clarence	19	13	6	0	1796	1435	125.2	52
3	Sandy Bay	19	10	9	0	1674	1649	101.5	40
4	New Norfolk	19	9	10	0	1691	1526	110.8	36
5	Glenorchy	19	6	13	0	1640	1869	87.7	24
6	Hobart	19	4	15	0	1478	2085	70.9	20 (Note: 4 bonus points?)

=== Round 1 ===
(Saturday, 5 April & Monday, 7 April 1969)

- Sandy Bay 14.8 (92) v Nth Hobart 10.20 (80) – Att: 7,123 at North Hobart Oval
- New Norfolk 8.17 (65) v Hobart 5.6 (36) – Att: 3,242 at Boyer Oval
- Clarence 22.17 (149) v Glenorchy 10.5 (65) – Att: 7,858 at North Hobart Oval (Monday)

=== Round 2 ===
(Saturday, 12 April 1969)

- Glenorchy 12.8 (80) v New Norfolk 9.10 (64) – Att: 4,358 at North Hobart Oval
- Nth Hobart 8.11 (59) v Clarence 4.12 (36) – Att: 4,296 at Bellerive Oval
- Sandy Bay 19.12 (126) v Hobart 5.12 (42) – Att: 3,241 at Queenborough Oval

=== Round 3 ===
(Saturday, 19 April 1969)

- Hobart 11.17 (83) v Nth Hobart 12.9 (81) – Att: 4,039 at North Hobart Oval
- Clarence 13.9 (87) v New Norfolk 10.11 (71) – Att: 3,006 at Boyer Oval
- Glenorchy 10.22 (82) v Sandy Bay 8.10 (58) – Att: 4,049 at KGV Football Park

=== Round 4 ===
(Friday, 25 April & Saturday, 26 April 1969)

- Nth Hobart 18.14 (122) v Glenorchy 13.15 (93) – Att: 7,524 at North Hobart Oval (Friday)
- Clarence 18.24 (132) v Hobart 16.23 (119) – Att: 3,549 at TCA Ground
- Sandy Bay 17.13 (115) v New Norfolk 15.14 (104) – Att: 4,396 at North Hobart Oval

=== Round 5 ===
(Saturday, 3 May 1969)

- Clarence 21.13 (139) v Sandy Bay 10.8 (68) – Att: 6,501 at North Hobart Oval
- Nth Hobart 14.5 (89) v New Norfolk 10.24 (84) – Att: 3,012 at Boyer Oval *
- Glenorchy 22.14 (146) v Hobart 12.10 (82) – Att: 2,904 at TCA Ground

Note: North Hobart's first official match as the Demons, formerly the Robins.

=== Round 6 ===
(Saturday, 10 May 1969)

- New Norfolk 22.20 (152) v Hobart 6.13 (49) – Att: 3,226 at North Hobart Oval
- Nth Hobart 12.14 (86) v Sandy Bay 9.14 (68) – Att: 3,781 at Queenborough Oval
- Clarence 17.25 (127) v Glenorchy 15.10 (100) – Att: 3,893 at Bellerive Oval

=== Round 7 ===
(Saturday, 17 May 1969)

- Clarence 15.13 (103) v Nth Hobart 6.9 (45) – Att: 2,967 at North Hobart Oval
- New Norfolk 14.17 (101) v Glenorchy 10.10 (70) – Att: 2,091 at KGV Football Park
- Hobart 11.13 (79) v Sandy Bay 7.6 (48) – Att: 1,154 at TCA Ground

=== Round 8 ===
(Saturday, 31 May 1969)

- Sandy Bay 10.15 (75) v Glenorchy 10.13 (73) – Att: 3,208 at North Hobart Oval
- New Norfolk 9.10 (64) v Clarence 6.10 (46) – Att: 2,865 at Bellerive Oval
- Nth Hobart 16.13 (109) v Hobart 15.8 (98) – Att: 2,458 at TCA Ground

=== Round 9 ===
(Saturday, 7 June 1969)

- Clarence 22.11 (143) v Hobart 11.12 (78) – Att: 3,373 at North Hobart Oval
- New Norfolk 10.15 (75) v Sandy Bay 8.9 (57) – Att: 2,038 at Boyer Oval
- Nth Hobart 16.12 (108) v Glenorchy 14.14 (98) – Att: 3,102 at KGV Football Park

=== Round 10 ===
(Saturday, 14 June & Monday, 16 June 1969)

- Glenorchy 16.25 (121) v Hobart 14.14 (98) – Att: 2,595 at North Hobart Oval
- Clarence 9.18 (72) v Sandy Bay 6.12 (48) – Att: 3,334 at Queenborough Oval
- Nth Hobart 18.6 (114) v New Norfolk 15.18 (108) – Att: 5,881 at North Hobart Oval (Monday)

=== Round 11 ===
(Saturday, 21 June 1969)

- Nth Hobart 16.15 (111) v Sandy Bay 15.12 (102) – Att: 4,102 at North Hobart Oval
- Clarence 10.17 (77) v Glenorchy 7.10 (52) – Att: 3,158 at KGV Football Park
- Hobart 11.23 (89) v New Norfolk 8.12 (60) – Att: 1,742 at TCA Ground

=== Round 12 ===
(Saturday, 28 June 1969)

- Sandy Bay 12.17 (89) v Hobart 9.14 (68) – Att: 3,259 at North Hobart Oval
- Nth Hobart 16.17 (113) v Clarence 12.21 (93) – Att: 3,764 at Bellerive Oval
- New Norfolk 16.8 (104) v Glenorchy 12.15 (87) – Att: 2,056 at Boyer Oval

=== Round 13 ===
(Saturday, 5 July 1969)

- Nth Hobart 19.10 (124) v Hobart 10.10 (70) – Att: 3,177 at North Hobart Oval
- New Norfolk 8.10 (58) v Clarence 5.14 (44) – Att: 2,152 at Boyer Oval
- Sandy Bay 19.9 (123) v Glenorchy 13.17 (95) – Att: 2,339 at Queenborough Oval

=== Round 14 ===
(Saturday, 12 July 1969)

- Nth Hobart 15.22 (112) v Glenorchy 15.16 (106) – Att: 3,956 at North Hobart Oval
- Sandy Bay 13.10 (88) v New Norfolk 10.17 (77) – Att: 2,982 at Queenborough Oval
- Clarence 15.10 (100) v Hobart 9.12 (66) – Att: 2,166 at Bellerive Oval

=== Round 15 ===
(Saturday, 19 July 1969)

- Nth Hobart 15.14 (104) v New Norfolk 14.17 (101) – Att: 4,110 at North Hobart Oval
- Clarence 15.14 (104) v Sandy Bay 9.19 (73) – Att: 2,610 at Bellerive Oval
- Glenorchy 19.12 (126) v Hobart 13.8 (86) – Att: 1,572 at KGV Football Park

=== Round 16 ===
(Saturday, 26 July 1969)

- Clarence 12.17 (89) v Glenorchy 9.20 (74) – Att: 3,710 at North Hobart Oval
- Hobart 15.11 (101) v New Norfolk 13.15 (93) – Att: 1,621 at TCA Ground
- Nth Hobart 16.6 (102) v Sandy Bay 13.12 (90) – Att: 3,224 at Queenborough Oval

=== Round 17 ===
(Saturday, 2 August 1969)

- Nth Hobart 18.13 (121) v Clarence 5.12 (42) – Att: 4,629 at North Hobart Oval
- Sandy Bay 21.6 (132) v Hobart 9.8 (62) – Att: 1,783 at Queenborough Oval
- New Norfolk 16.16 (112) v Glenorchy 8.12 (60) – Att: 1,520 at Boyer Oval

=== Round 18 ===
(Saturday, 9 August 1969)

- Nth Hobart 11.16 (82) v Clarence 10.16 (76) – Att: 3,238 at North Hobart Oval
- Sandy Bay 14.10 (94) v Glenorchy 12.10 (82) – Att: 1,522 at KGV Football Park
- New Norfolk 14.17 (101) v Hobart 13.15 (93) – Att: 1,794 at TCA Ground

=== Round 19 ===
(Saturday, 16 August 1969)

- Sandy Bay 20.8 (128) v New Norfolk 16.19 (115) – Att: 3,607 at North Hobart Oval
- Clarence 19.23 (137) v Hobart 11.13 (79) – Att: 2,148 at Bellerive Oval
- Glenorchy 18.16 (124) v Nth Hobart 9.28 (82) – Att: 2,565 at KGV Football Park

=== First Semi Final ===
(Saturday, 23 August 1969)

- New Norfolk: 3.6 (24) | 7.10 (52) | 8.14 (62) | 13.15 (93)
- Sandy Bay: 2.2 (14) | 3.9 (27) | 11.14 (80) | 13.14 (92)
- Attendance: 9,695 at North Hobart Oval

=== Second Semi Final ===
(Saturday, 30 August 1969)

- Nth Hobart: 8.2 (50) | 9.3 (57) | 17.6 (108) | 24.10 (154)
- Clarence: 2.3 (15) | 4.8 (32) | 8.11 (59) | 10.13 (73)
- Attendance: 12,461 at North Hobart Oval

=== Preliminary Final ===
(Saturday, 6 September 1969)

- Clarence: 4.12 (36) | 11.17 (83) | 15.21 (111) | 17.23 (125)
- New Norfolk: 3.3 (21) | 4.5 (29) | 8.5 (53) | 11.7 (73)
- Attendance: 11,618 at North Hobart Oval

=== Grand Final ===
(Saturday, 13 September 1969)

- Nth Hobart: 2.4 (16) | 8.10 (58) | 15.12 (102) | 19.15 (129)
- Clarence: 3.4 (22) | 6.4 (40) | 12.7 (79) | 17.15 (117)
- Attendance: 19,425 at North Hobart Oval

Source: All scores and statistics courtesy of the Hobart Mercury and Saturday Evening Mercury (SEM) publications.
