= 1950 TANFL season =

Australian rules football season

- Teams: Clarence Kangaroos; Hobart Tigers; New Norfolk Eagles; New Town Magpies; North Hobart Robins; Sandy Bay Seagulls
- Premiers: Hobart
- Minor premiers: Hobart; 2nd minor premiership

Attendance
- Matches played: 49
- Total attendance: 170,712 (3,484 per match)

The 1950 Tasmanian Australian National Football League (TANFL) premiership season was an Australian Rules football competition staged in Hobart, Tasmania over twenty (20) roster rounds and four (4) finals series matches between 15 April and 7 October 1950.

On 7 August, near the end of their fourth season of competition, the TANFL formally admitted Clarence and New Norfolk as full and permanent members of the TANFL, with equal rights and financial support as the four city clubs.

== Participating Clubs ==
- Clarence District Football Club
- Hobart Football Club
- New Norfolk District Football Club
- New Town District Football Club
- North Hobart Football Club
- Sandy Bay Football Club

=== 1950 TANFL Club Coaches ===
- Jack Bennett (Clarence)
- Jack Sullivan (Hobart)
- Bert Edwards (New Norfolk)
- Roy Cazaly (New Town)
- Vern Rae (North Hobart)
- Jack Rogers (Sandy Bay)

=== TANFL Reserves Grand Final ===
- New Town 12.14 (86) v Sandy Bay 10.10 (70) – North Hobart Oval

=== TANFL Under-19's Grand Final ===
State Schools Old Boys Football Association (SSOBFA)

- Macalburn 9.12 (66) v Buckingham 6.3 (39) – New Town Oval.

Note: Macalburn were affiliated to Hobart, Buckingham were affiliated to New Town.

=== State Preliminary Final ===
(Saturday, 7 October 1950)

- Nth Launceston: 0.1 (1) | 6.5 (41) | 9.5 (59) | 14.16 (100)
- Ulverstone: 4.3 (27) | 5.4 (34) | 7.8 (50) | 8.8 (56)
- Attendance: 4680 at York Park

=== State Grand Final ===
(Saturday, 14 October 1950)

- Nth Launceston: 7.2 (44) | 7.3 (45) | 12.4 (76) | 14.9 (93)
- Hobart Tigers: 4.1 (25) | 5.5 (35) | 5.9 (39) | 8.10 (58)
- Attendance: 10,006 at North Hobart Oval

=== Intrastate Matches ===
Jubilee Shield (Saturday, 29 July 1950)

- NTFA 17.17 (119) v TANFL 12.10 (82) – Att: 8,500 at York Park

Inter-Association Match (Saturday, 29 July 1950)

- Huon FA 16.8 (104) v TANFL 12.12 (84) – Att: 1,130 at Franklin Oval

=== Interstate Matches ===
See – 1950 Australian National Football Carnival

Australian National Football Carnival (Wednesday, 19 July 1950)

- Tasmania 14.7 (91) v Victorian FA 9.15 (69) – Att: N/A at Brisbane Exhibition Ground

Australian National Football Carnival (Saturday, 22 July 1950)

- Sth Australia 13.14 (92) v Tasmania 8.11 (59) – Att: N/A at Brisbane Exhibition Ground

Australian National Football Carnival (Monday, 24 July 1950)

- Victoria 16.11 (107) v Tasmania 8.7 (55) – Att: N/A at Brisbane Exhibition Ground

Australian National Football Carnival (Wednesday, 26 July 1950)

- Western Australia 11.12 (78) v Tasmania 11.5 (71) – Att: N/A at Brisbane Exhibition Ground

Interstate Match (Sunday, 30 July 1950)

- Tasmania 23.16 (154) v New South Wales 13.17 (95) – Att: N/A at Trumper Park Oval, Sydney

Exhibition Match (Saturday, 29 July 1950)

- Melbourne 19.24 (138) v TANFL 8.17 (65) – Att: 4,153 at North Hobart Oval

=== Leading Goalkickers: TANFL ===
- Ian Westell (Sandy Bay) – 83
- Bernie Waldron (Hobart) – 67
- J.Cooper (Clarence) – 47
- Bobby Parsons (New Town) – 47
- Albert Park (New Town) – 41

=== Medal Winners ===
- Warren Smart (Sandy Bay) – William Leitch Medal
- R.Toulmin (Sandy Bay) – George Watt Medal (Reserves)
- John Chick (Glenorchy) – V.A Geard Medal (Under-19's)

== 1950 TANFL Ladder ==
Pos	Team	Pld	W	L	D	PF	PA	PP	Pts
1	Hobart	20	15	5	0	1656	1256	131.8	60
2	North Hobart	20	13	7	0	1643	1400	117.4	52
3	New Town	20	12	8	0	1769	1582	111.8	48
4	Sandy Bay	20	10	10	0	1609	1533	105.0	40
5	New Norfolk	20	9	11	0	1492	1528	97.6	36
6	Clarence	20	1	19	0	1232	2102	58.6	4

=== Round 1 ===
(Saturday, 15 April 1950)

- Nth Hobart 10.14 (74) v Sandy Bay 11.3 (69) – Att: 3,386 at North Hobart Oval
- New Town 9.13 (67) v Hobart 8.14 (62) – Att: 2,989 at New Town Oval
- Clarence 11.6 (72) v New Norfolk 7.8 (50) – Att: 1,427 at Boyer Oval

=== Round 2 ===
(Saturday, 22 April 1950)

- Nth Hobart 13.15 (93) v Clarence 11.8 (74) – Att: 2,964 at North Hobart Oval
- Sandy Bay 15.14 (104) v New Town 11.12 (78) – Att: 2,528 at New Town Oval
- Hobart 8.17 (65) v New Norfolk 2.6 (18) – Att: 1,612 at TCA Ground

=== Round 3 ===
(Saturday, 29 April 1950)

- Hobart 4.13 (37) v Sandy Bay 3.10 (28) – Att: 5,619 at North Hobart Oval
- New Town 21.15 (141) v Clarence 10.9 (69) – Att: 1,974 at New Town Oval
- Nth Hobart 15.21 (111) v New Norfolk 6.5 (41) – Att: 1,483 at Boyer Oval

=== Round 4 ===
(Saturday, 6 May 1950)

- Nth Hobart 16.18 (114) v New Town 12.2 (74) – Att: 4,270 at North Hobart Oval
- New Norfolk 18.3 (111) v Sandy Bay 13.12 (90) – Att: 1,308 at Queenborough Oval
- Hobart 12.17 (89) v Clarence 13.6 (84) – Att: 1,151 at TCA Ground

=== Round 5 ===
(Saturday, 13 May 1950)

- Nth Hobart 10.12 (72) v Hobart 9.14 (68) – Att: 5,388 at North Hobart Oval
- Sandy Bay 11.19 (85) v Clarence 12.8 (80) – Att: 1,420 at TCA Ground
- New Norfolk 13.6 (84) v New Town 4.20 (44) – Att: 1,628 at Boyer Oval

=== Round 6 ===
(Saturday, 20 May 1950)

- New Norfolk 19.11 (125) v Clarence 7.12 (54) – Att: 1,954 at North Hobart Oval
- Nth Hobart 10.8 (68) v Sandy Bay 7.13 (55) – Att: 2,049 at Queenborough Oval
- Hobart 19.12 (126) v New Town 6.21 (57) – Att: 1,858 at TCA Ground

=== Round 7 ===
(Saturday, 27 May 1950)

- New Town 13.16 (94) v Sandy Bay 12.10 (82) – Att: 4,010 at North Hobart Oval
- Hobart 9.13 (67) v New Norfolk 10.5 (65) – Att: 2,251 at Boyer Oval
- Nth Hobart 17.11 (113) v Clarence 8.13 (61) – Att: 1,270 at Bellerive Oval

=== Round 8 ===
(Saturday, 3 June 1950)

- Nth Hobart 18.17 (125) v New Norfolk 6.5 (41) – Att: 4,236 at North Hobart Oval
- Hobart 12.12 (84) v Sandy Bay 11.5 (71) – Att: 2,086 at Queenborough
- New Town 22.11 (143) v Clarence 10.19 (79) – Att: 1,002 at Bellerive Oval

=== Round 9 ===
(Saturday, 17 June 1950)

- Sandy Bay 7.19 (61) v New Norfolk 6.11 (47) – Att: 1,988 at North Hobart Oval
- Nth Hobart 10.14 (74) v New Town 8.9 (57) – Att: 3,138 at New Town Oval
- Hobart 13.17 (95) v Clarence 13.4 (82) – Att: 975 at Bellerive Oval

=== Round 10 ===
(Saturday, 24 June 1950)

- New Town 10.18 (78) v New Norfolk 11.6 (72) – Att: 1,909 at North Hobart Oval
- Hobart 20.13 (133) v Nth Hobart 9.5 (59) – Att: 3,861 at TCA Ground
- Sandy Bay 9.19 (73) v Clarence 9.10 (64) – Att: 1,314 at Queenborough Oval

=== Round 11 ===
(Saturday, 1 July 1950)

- Sandy Bay 14.13 (97) v Nth Hobart 10.14 (74) – Att: 3,250 at North Hobart Oval
- New Town 13.21 (99) v Hobart 8.18 (66) – Att: 2,973 at New Town Oval
- New Norfolk 15.14 (104) v Clarence 7.12 (54) – Att: 995 at Bellerive Oval

=== Round 12 ===
(Saturday, 8 July 1950)

- Nth Hobart 10.20 (80) v Clarence 6.7 (43) – Att: 1,888 at North Hobart Oval
- Sandy Bay 12.10 (82) v New Town 11.12 (78) – Att: 2,680 at Queenborough Oval
- Hobart 11.14 (80) v New Norfolk 8.8 (56) – Att: 1,331 at TCA Ground

=== Round 13 ===
(Saturday, 15 July 1950)

- New Town 19.16 (130) v Clarence 14.13 (97) – Att: 1,787 at North Hobart Oval
- Hobart 19.9 (123) v Sandy Bay 14.14 (98) – Att: 3,704 at TCA Ground
- New Norfolk 11.15 (81) v Nth Hobart 12.8 (80) – Att: 1,492 at Boyer Oval

=== Round 14 ===
(Saturday, 22 July 1950)

- New Town 11.10 (76) v Nth Hobart 8.11 (59) – Att: 3,257 at North Hobart Oval
- Hobart 18.18 (126) v Clarence 4.9 (33) – Att: 1,118 at TCA Ground *
- New Norfolk 12.14 (86) v Sandy Bay 8.9 (57) – Att: 1,504 at Boyer Oval

Note: Bernie Waldron kicked a then Hobart Football Club record of 14 goals in this match, later breaking the record again on 30 August 1952.

=== Round 15 ===
(Saturday, 5 August 1950)

- Hobart 4.8 (32) v Nth Hobart 1.11 (17) – Att: 2,027 at North Hobart Oval
- New Norfolk 14.1 (85) v New Town 10.18 (78) – Att: 1,069 at New Town Oval
- Sandy Bay 17.10 (112) v Clarence 7.13 (55) – Att: 586 at Bellerive Oval

=== Round 16 ===
(Saturday, 12 August 1950)

- Hobart 13.15 (93) v New Town 9.16 (70) – Att: 4,694 at North Hobart Oval
- Nth Hobart 13.12 (90) v Sandy Bay 10.14 (74) – Att: 1,582 at Queenborough Oval
- New Norfolk 20.21 (141) v Clarence 5.8 (38) – Att: 1,074 at Boyer Oval

=== Round 17 ===
(Saturday, 19 August 1950)

- New Norfolk 15.10 (100) v Hobart 9.17 (71) – Att: 5,136 at North Hobart Oval
- New Town 14.19 (103) v Sandy Bay 12.7 (79) – Att: 1,783 at New Town Oval
- Nth Hobart 15.15 (105) v Clarence 8.14 (62) – Att: 759 at Bellerive Oval

=== Round 18 ===
(Saturday, 26 August 1950)

- Nth Hobart 18.13 (121) v New Norfolk 6.11 (47) – Att: 4,329 at North Hobart Oval
- Sandy Bay 11.13 (79) v Hobart 8.12 (60) – Att: 1,185 at Queenborough Oval
- New Town 19.19 (133) v Clarence 4.10 (34) – Att: 726 at Bellerive Oval

=== Round 19 ===
(Saturday, 2 September 1950)

- Hobart 9.14 (68) v Clarence 8.7 (55) – Att: 855 at North Hobart Oval
- New Town 15.14 (104) v Nth Hobart 9.14 (68) – Att: 1,988 at New Town Oval
- Sandy Bay 17.15 (117) v New Norfolk 12.13 (85) – Att: 1,878 at Queenborough Oval

=== Round 20 ===
(Saturday, 9 September 1950)

- Sandy Bay 14.12 (96) v Clarence 5.12 (42) – Att: 1,572 at North Hobart Oval
- Hobart 15.21 (111) v Nth Hobart 6.10 (46) – Att: 1,468 at TCA Ground
- New Town 9.11 (65) v New Norfolk 7.11 (53) – Att: 1,371 at Boyer Oval

=== First Semi Final ===
(Saturday, 16 September 1950)

- New Town: 3.5 (23) | 11.11 (77) | 13.14 (92) | 20.19 (139)
- Sandy Bay: 1.5 (11) | 2.7 (19) | 4.11 (35) | 7.11 (53)
- Attendance: 8,313 at North Hobart Oval

=== Second Semi Final ===
(Saturday, 23 September 1950)

- Hobart: 3.2 (20) | 5.9 (39) | 8.13 (61) | 11.15 (81)
- Nth Hobart: 1.7 (13) | 2.7 (19) | 4.10 (34) | 6.14 (50)
- Attendance: 7,489 at North Hobart Oval

=== Preliminary Final ===
(Saturday, 30 September 1950)

- New Town: 4.6 (30) | 7.9 (51) | 10.15 (75) | 12.16 (88)
- Nth Hobart: 1.4 (10) | 2.6 (18) | 4.8 (32) | 9.9 (63)
- Attendance: 7,420 at North Hobart Oval

=== Grand Final ===
(Saturday, 7 October 1950)

- Hobart: 3.4 (22) | 6.6 (42) | 11.10 (76) | 11.12 (78)
- New Town: 4.2 (26) | 7.5 (47) | 8.10 (58) | 11.10 (76)
- Attendance: 12,697 at North Hobart Oval
