= 1948 TANFL season =

Australian rules football season

- Teams: Clarence Kangaroos; New Town Magpies; Hobart Tigers; New Norfolk Eagles; North Hobart Robins; Sandy Bay Seagulls
- Premiers: New Town
- Minor premiers: Sandy Bay; 1st minor premiership

Attendance
- Matches played: 49
- Total attendance: 139,590 (2,849 per match)

The 1948 Tasmanian Australian National Football League (TANFL) premiership season was an Australian Rules football competition staged in Hobart, Tasmania over fifteen (15) roster rounds and four (4) finals series matches between 24 April and 25 September 1948.

== Participating Clubs ==
- Clarence District Football Club
- New Town District Football Club
- Hobart Football Club
- New Norfolk District Football Club
- North Hobart Football Club
- Sandy Bay Football Club

=== 1948 TANFL Club Coaches ===
- E.Edwards (Clarence)
- Roy Cazaly (New Town)
- Jack Sullivan (Hobart)
- Albert "Tich" Edwards (New Norfolk)
- Jack Metherell (North Hobart)
- Ernie Pilkington (Sandy Bay)

=== TANFL Reserves Grand Final ===
- New Town 9.11 (65) v Nth Hobart 8.10 (58) – North Hobart Oval

=== TANFL Under-19's Grand Final ===
State Schools Old Boys Football Association (SSOBFA)

- Buckingham 10.8 (68) v North West 8.3 (51) – New Town Oval.

Note: Buckingham were affiliated to New Town, North West were affiliated to North Hobart.

=== State Grand Final ===
(Saturday, 2 October 1948)

- New Town: 16.9 (105)
- Nth Launceston: 16.7 (103)
- Attendance: 8,387 at North Hobart Oval

=== Intrastate Matches ===
Jubilee Shield (Saturday, 15 May 1948)

- NWFU 13.16 (94) v TANFL 10.17 (77) – Att: 2,300 at West Park Oval

Jubilee Shield (Saturday, 5 June 1948)

- NTFA 16.19 (115) v TANFL 15.17 (107) – Att: 9,636 at North Hobart Oval

Jubilee Shield (Saturday, 19 June 1948)

- TANFL 15.16 (106) v NTFA 14.12 (96) – Att: 6,602 at North Hobart Oval

Jubilee Shield (Saturday, 10 July 1948)

- NTFA 18.18 (126) v TANFL 16.13 (109) – Att: 10,000 at York Park

=== Interstate Match ===
Exhibition Match (Saturday, 31 July 1948)

- East Perth 14.17 (101) v TANFL 12.20 (92) – Att: 4,385 at North Hobart Oval

=== Leading Goalkickers: TANFL ===
- Ian Westell (Sandy Bay) – 57
- W.Pepper (Hobart) – 49
- J.Martin (Sandy Bay) – 45
- D.Challender (North Hobart) – 44
- G.Barwick (New Norfolk) – 35

=== Medal winners ===
- Joe Brown (New Norfolk) – William Leitch Medal
- Not Awarded – George Watt Medal (Reserves)
- Rex Garwood (Buckingham) – V.A Geard Medal (Under-19's)

== 1948 TANFL Ladder ==
| Pos | Team | Pld | W | L | D | PF | PA | PP | Pts |
|---|---|---|---|---|---|---|---|---|---|
| 1 | Sandy Bay | 15 | 11 | 3 | 1 | 1245 | 1030 | 120.9 | 46 |
| 2 | New Town | 15 | 10 | 4 | 1 | 1263 | 917 | 137.7 | 42 |
| 3 | Hobart | 15 | 10 | 5 | 0 | 1150 | 844 | 136.3 | 40 |
| 4 | North Hobart | 15 | 7 | 8 | 0 | 1171 | 1096 | 106.8 | 28 |
| 5 | New Norfolk | 15 | 5 | 10 | 0 | 978 | 1081 | 90.5 | 20 |
| 6 | Clarence | 15 | 1 | 14 | 0 | 709 | 1542 | 46.0 | 4 |

=== Round 1 ===
(Saturday, 24 April 1948)

- Sandy Bay 12.13 (85) v Nth Hobart 11.15 (81) – Att: 4,151 at North Hobart Oval
- Hobart 12.6 (78) v New Norfolk 6.13 (49) – Att: 2,271 at TCA Ground
- New Town 13.20 (98) v Clarence 7.20 (62) – Att: 1,252 at Bellerive Oval

=== Round 2 ===
(Saturday, 1 May 1948)

- Sandy Bay 11.17 (83) v Clarence 9.16 (70) – Att: 1,896 at North Hobart Oval
- Nth Hobart 10.13 (73) v Hobart 8.16 (64) – Att: 4,536 at TCA Ground
- New Norfolk 9.18 (72) v New Town 8.13 (61) – Att: 1,750 at Boyer Oval

=== Round 3 ===
(Saturday, 8 May 1948)

- Hobart 13.15 (93) v New Town 12.15 (87) – Att: 3,397 at North Hobart Oval
- Sandy Bay 13.20 (98) v New Norfolk 9.9 (63) – Att: 2,134 at Queenborough Oval
- Nth Hobart 16.20 (116) v Clarence 3.11 (29) – Att: 1,025 at Bellerive Oval

=== Round 4 ===
(Saturday, 22 May 1948)

- New Norfolk 12.9 (81) v Nth Hobart 11.12 (78) – Att: 2,538 at North Hobart Oval
- New Town 11.16 (82) v Sandy Bay 11.15 (81) – Att: 3,592 at New Town Oval
- Hobart 19.20 (134) v Clarence 5.5 (35) – Att: 1,134 at Bellerive Oval

=== Round 5 ===
(Saturday, 29 May 1948)

- New Town 6.25 (61) v Nth Hobart 5.9 (39) – Att: 3,361 at North Hobart Oval
- Sandy Bay 10.9 (69) v Hobart 8.17 (65) – Att: 2,339 at Queenborough Oval
- New Norfolk 12.19 (91) v Clarence 2.8 (20) – Att: 1,029 at Boyer Oval

=== Round 6 ===
(Saturday, 12 June 1948)

- New Town 22.24 (156) v Clarence 8.12 (60) – Att: 1,783 at North Hobart Oval
- Sandy Bay 12.13 (85) v Nth Hobart 11.7 (73) – Att: 3,286 at Queenborough Oval
- Hobart 10.5 (65) v New Norfolk 3.3 (21) – Att: 1,843 at Boyer Oval

=== Round 7 ===
(Monday, 14 June 1948)

- Hobart 10.6 (66) v Nth Hobart 5.13 (43) – Att: 3,999 at North Hobart Oval
- New Town 16.17 (113) v New Norfolk 13.5 (83) – Att: 2,498 at New Town Oval
- Sandy Bay 21.20 (146) v Clarence 9.10 (64) – Att: 1,035 at Bellerive Oval

=== Round 8 ===
(Saturday, 26 June 1948)

- Nth Hobart 8.18 (66) v Clarence 3.12 (30) – Att: 901 at North Hobart Oval
- New Town 8.12 (60) v Hobart 7.7 (49) – Att: 3,636 at TCA Ground
- Sandy Bay 9.7 (61) v New Norfolk 6.10 (46) – Att: 1,084 at Boyer Oval

=== Round 9 ===
(Saturday, 3 July 1948)

- New Town 10.8 (68) v Sandy Bay 10.8 (68) – Att: 5,433 at North Hobart Oval
- Hobart 16.25 (121) v Clarence 4.13 (37) – Att: 548 at TCA Ground
- Nth Hobart 13.7 (85) v New Norfolk 10.14 (74) – Att: 1,065 at Boyer Oval

=== Round 10 ===
(Saturday, 17 July 1948)

- Hobart 10.18 (78) v Sandy Bay 9.15 (69) – Att: 3,075 at North Hobart Oval
- New Town 16.15 (111) v Nth Hobart 12.11 (83) – Att: 2,107 at New Town Oval
- New Norfolk 9.11 (65) v Clarence 6.8 (44) – Att: 1,012 at Bellerive Oval

=== Round 11 ===
(Saturday, 24 July 1948)

- Nth Hobart 19.9 (123) v Sandy Bay 13.15 (93) – Att: 3,975 at North Hobart Oval
- New Town 19.25 (139) v Clarence 8.7 (55) – Att: 1,126 at New Town Oval
- Hobart 9.13 (67) v New Norfolk 8.11 (59) – Att: 1,378 at Boyer Oval

=== Round 12 ===
(Saturday, 7 August 1948)

- New Town 16.17 (113) v New Norfolk 7.11 (53) – Att: 2,114 at North Hobart Oval
- Nth Hobart 13.13 (91) v Hobart 12.12 (84) – Att: 3,049 at TCA Ground
- Sandy Bay 13.11 (89) v Clarence 6.10 (46) – Att: 1,019 at Queenborough Oval

=== Round 13 ===
(Saturday, 14 August 1948)

- Sandy Bay 7.12 (54) v New Norfolk 5.4 (34) – Att: 1,627 at North Hobart Oval
- Hobart 6.15 (51) v New Town 3.10 (28) – Att: 3,448 at New Town Oval
- Clarence 7.22 (64) v Nth Hobart 5.19 (49) – Att: 500 at Bellerive Oval

=== Round 14 ===
(Saturday, 21 August 1948)

- Nth Hobart 12.18 (90) v New Norfolk 8.8 (56) – Att: 1,658 at North Hobart Oval
- Sandy Bay 11.14 (80) v New Town 8.12 (60) – Att: 4,222 at Queenborough Oval
- Hobart 7.16 (58) v Clarence 4.15 (39) – Att: 836 at Bellerive Oval

=== Round 15 ===
(Saturday, 28 August 1948)

- New Town 17.11 (113) v Nth Hobart 11.15 (81) – Att: 2,940 at North Hobart Oval
- Sandy Bay 11.18 (84) v Hobart 11.11 (77) – Att: 4,028 at TCA Ground
- New Norfolk 19.17 (131) v Clarence 6.18 (54) – Att: 885 at Boyer Oval

=== First Semi Final ===
(Saturday, 4 September 1948)

- Nth Hobart: 5.0 (30) | 6.3 (39) | 9.8 (62) | 13.10 (88)
- Hobart: 5.3 (33) | 8.6 (54) | 10.6 (66) | 12.7 (79)
- Attendance: 6,792 at North Hobart Oval

=== Second Semi Final ===
(Saturday, 11 September 1948)

- New Town: 4.2 (26) | 6.6 (42) | 10.10 (70) | 11.13 (79)
- Sandy Bay: 0.5 (5) | 3.8 (26) | 7.11 (53) | 8.15 (63)
- Attendance: 8,918 at North Hobart Oval

=== Preliminary Final ===
(Saturday, 18 September 1948)

- Nth Hobart: 4.3 (27) | 8.5 (53) | 13.7 (85) | 15.8 (98)
- Sandy Bay: 2.5 (17) | 3.9 (27) | 7.11 (53) | 11.16 (82)
- Attendance: 9,129 at North Hobart Oval

=== Grand Final ===
(Saturday, 25 September 1948)

- New Town: 1.3 (9) | 3.10 (28) | 6.14 (50) | 11.15 (81)
- Nth Hobart: 1.4 (10) | 2.8 (20) | 5.9 (39) | 9.11 (65)
- Attendance: 12,236 at North Hobart Oval

Source: All scores and statistics courtesy of the Hobart Mercury publications.
