= 1989 TFL Statewide League season =

- Teams: Burnie Hawks; Clarence Kangaroos; Devonport Blues; Glenorchy Magpies; Hobart Tigers; New Norfolk Eagles; North Hobart Demons; North Launceston Robins; Sandy Bay Seagulls; South Launceston Bulldogs
- Premiers: North Hobart
- Minor premiers: North Launceston; 1st minor premiership

Attendance
- Matches played: 96
- Total attendance: 192,943 (2,010 per match)

The 1989 TFL Statewide League premiership season was an Australian rules football competition staged across Tasmania, Australia over eighteen roster rounds and six finals series matches between 1 April and 16 September 1989.

The League was known as the Cascade-Boags Statewide League under a dual commercial naming-rights sponsorship agreement with both Cascade Brewery in Hobart and Boag's Brewery in Launceston.

== Participating Clubs ==
- Burnie Hawks Football Club
- Clarence District Football Club
- Devonport Blues Football Club
- Glenorchy District Football Club
- Hobart Football Club
- New Norfolk District Football Club
- North Hobart Football Club
- North Launceston Football Club
- Sandy Bay Football Club
- South Launceston Football Club

=== 1989 TFL Statewide League Club Coaches ===
- Colin Robertson (Burnie Hawks)
- Peter Daniel (Clarence)
- Roland Crosby (Devonport)
- Billy Picken (Glenorchy)
- Mark Browning (Hobart)
- Brian Hickey (New Norfolk)
- Garry Davidson (North Hobart)
- Steven Goulding (North Launceston)
- Shane Williams (Sandy Bay)
- Ian Paton (South Launceston)

=== Medibank Private Cup (Reserves) Grand Final ===
- Sandy Bay 10.14 (74) v Devonport 8.8 (56) – North Hobart Oval

=== Tasmania Bank Colts (Under-19's) Grand Final ===
- Sandy Bay 10.8 (68) v South Launceston 7.8 (50) – North Hobart Oval

=== Leading Goalkickers: TFL Statewide League ===
- Shane Fell (Glenorchy) – 114
- Wayne Fox (Hobart) – 97
- Steven Cole (Burnie Hawks) – 76
- Paul Dac (New Norfolk) – 62

=== Medal Winners ===
- Scott Wade (Clarence) – William Leitch Medal
- Jeffrey Wood (Devonport) – George Watt Medal (Reserves)
- Damien Goss (Hobart) – V.A Geard Medal (Under-19's)
- Paul Barrow (New Norfolk) – D.R Plaister Medal (Under-17's)
- Scott Wade (Clarence) – Delphin Medalist (Best Player in NFL Shield)
- Scott Wade (Clarence) – Lefroy Medalist (Best Player in State Matches)
- Jim Mathewson (Nth Hobart) – Darrel Baldock Medalist (Best player in TFL Grand Final)

=== Foster's NFL Shield Interstate Matches ===
Foster's NFL Shield Match (Friday, 9 June 1989)

- ACT 12.2 (74) v Tasmania 8.12 (60) – Att: 1,743 at West Park Oval (Night)

Foster's NFL Shield Match (Saturday, 10 June 1989)

- Australian Amateurs 11.7 (73) v Tasmania 11.2 (68) – Att: 1,236 at York Park

Foster's NFL Shield Match (Monday, 12 June 1989)

- Tasmania 17.11 (113) v New South Wales 8.16 (64) – Att: 1,304 at North Hobart Oval

=== State of Origin Match ===
(Saturday, 2 July 1989)

- Victoria 25.13 (163) v Tasmania 15.17 (107) – Att: 12,342 at North Hobart Oval

=== 1989 TFL Club Home Attendance Figures ===
- Nth Hobart: 19,457 for 9 matches at 2,161
- Nth Launceston: 18,520 for 9 matches at 2,057
- Glenorchy: 18,274 for 9 matches at 2,030
- Clarence: 17,273 for 9 matches at 1,919
- Hobart: 16,433 for 9 matches at 1,825
- Burnie Hawks: 14,553 for 9 matches at 1,617
- Devonport: 14,213 for 9 matches at 1,579
- Sandy Bay: 12,290 for 9 matches at 1,365
- New Norfolk: 10,029 for 9 matches at 1,114
- Sth Launceston: 7,000 for 9 matches at 777

== Season summary ==
The 1989 TFL Statewide League season was the fourth season of statewide football and the football public were treated to some magnificent football throughout the season.

North Launceston were tipped to be the big improvers as were North Hobart, with Glenorchy and Devonport looming as possible outside chances.

Hobart under Mark Browning had had a large cleanout over the summer following their dismal end to 1988 and the jury was out on whether they would take the step up this season.

On the opening day Clarence threw their hat into the ring with a sensational 89-point demolition of North Hobart but their season would be punctuated with brilliant displays such as this, followed by the mediocre, sometimes even in the same game as in two such cases where they led Devonport by 55-points at three-quarter time at Bellerive Oval on 8 April only to see the Blues steam home to draw the game and again at the same venue on 14 July against the Burnie Hawks, the Roos again led by 55-points at the final change only to see the Hawks fly home to fail by one point.

North Launceston would be all the rage in the north of the state, the high-flying Robins would finally demonstrate their full potential to take the minor premiership ahead of North Hobart, who had produced many moments of champagne-football throughout the season including a Statewide League record score against the hapless New Norfolk at Boyer on 3 August with 38.15 (243).

On the eve of the finals, the rampaging Demons sent reigning premier Devonport, who had suffered a very disappointing fall from grace away from North Hobart Oval (the site of their ground-breaking premiership only eleven months previous) with a staggering 161-point defeat.

After a moderate start, Hobart would go on a rampage as well and storm into the finals with ten wins from their final eleven games to take third spot and aim for their first premiership since 1980.

Both Clarence and Glenorchy would be far from their dominant selves for much of the season, indeed Glenorchy were looking likely to miss the finals for the first time since 1973 but managed to produce four wins from their final five matches to sneak into the five over the Burnie Hawks, who lost their final two matches to miss out while Clarence won their final five matches to claim fourth spot.

At the other end of the table New Norfolk continued to wallow at the foot of the table and suffer from disastrous financial turmoil, during the season a crisis meeting was held at New Norfolk where discussions were held on what the future of the club may be, whether it be a merger, dropping out of the league or a last-ditch effort to rescue the club's ailing finances.

South Launceston continued to struggle on and off the field, with the TFL looking likely to attempt to get the struggling Bulldogs to move away from their sub-standard Youngtown ground and move them to York Park in an effort to lift the club's poor image and attract better crowds, whilst Sandy Bay would win their opening four games of the season then fall into a dark hole and only win another three for the rest of the season in a disappointing finish.

The TFL and various media commentators were similarly calling for Sandy Bay to merge with North Hobart and move its home base away from the tiny Queenborough Oval and up to North Hobart Oval in a bid to improve the Seagulls image and attract better crowds to their matches.

An exciting finals series got underway on 26 August with fierce inner-city rivals North Hobart and Hobart doing battle in the Qualifying Final.

Hobart broke out to a 31-point lead late in the second quarter only to see the Demons fight back and run away with the match to record a 31-point victory, while the following day, Clarence would start the Elimination Final strongly against hated rival Glenorchy and hold a five-goal lead shortly before half time only to see the Magpies draw level at three-quarter time and race away with the match to win by 30-points, keeping the Roos scoreless in the final quarter in the process.

On 2 September, football followers in both the North and South of the state were treated to two intriguing finals matches.

At York Park, minor premier North Launceston would face North Hobart for the right to go straight into the grand final.

Despite a good start for the Robins, North Hobart would find their way during the second quarter and run rampant, proving far too good on the day to record a 28-point win in front of almost 7,000 parochial Launcestonians.

Meanwhile, at North Hobart Oval, Hobart would do battle against the fading Magpie Machine from Glenorchy.

Glenorchy had made every grand final except one from 1975 to 1988 whilst their opponents Hobart had been in only three grand finals since 1966.

In a see-sawing contest all day which enthralled the 5,573-strong crowd, Glenorchy held sway by just 2-points at the final change before the Tigers unleashed a sensational seven goal to two burst in the final quarter to win by 29-points, consigning Glenorchy to missing their first Grand Final since 1981. In the Preliminary Final on 9 September, Hobart would do battle with North Launceston in a true North v South battle. The two clubs last North Hobart Oval finals meeting was in the 1950 State Grand Final and the Robins were keen to repeat that 1950 triumph.

Unfortunately for the minor premier, the hopes of the North weighed too heavily on them and they were crushed by a quiet and determined Tiger outfit who totally outclassed the Robins all day to book a Grand Final spot with a 41-point win. This however, was not to be the last time these two clubs would cross paths in the ensuing years.

The Grand Final showdown on 16 September was one eagerly awaited by football fans in the South, the two old inner-city rivals (North Hobart and Hobart) both with great histories were ready to battle it out in the Grand Final for the first time since 1960.

On a dull, cold day Hobart, looking to break a nine-year premiership drought, came out full of running and shocked an unsettled Demon side with six unanswered first quarter goals which left the 16,528-strong crowd stunned.

In the early stages of the second quarter, Hobart continued to hold sway and held a 35-point lead over North Hobart, but the Demons produced one of the most memorable spells of attacking football in TFL Grand Final history by rattling on eight unanswered goals in eleven minutes to jump out to a 9-point lead over a shell-shocked Hobart, Tiger forward Michael Winter booted his sixth goal right on half time to reduce the Demon lead to 3-points at the long break but the difference in body language of the two sides leaving the ground for half-time couldn't have been more stark.

In the second half it was all North Hobart as they ran rampant over Hobart, producing another six goals in the third quarter to break out to a 26-point three-quarter time lead and eventually run out 30-point winners over a gallant Hobart to take their second premiership in three years.

== 1989 TFL Statewide League Ladder ==
Pos	Team	Pld	W	L	D	PF	PA	PP	Pts
1	North Launceston	18	13	4	1	1932	1542	125.3	54
2	North Hobart	18	13	5	0	2477	1765	140.3	52
3	Hobart	18	13	5	0	2200	1874	117.4	52
4	Clarence	18	11	6	1	2030	1870	108.6	46
5	Glenorchy	18	11	7	0	1967	1704	115.4	44
6	Burnie Hawks	18	9	8	1	2336	2052	113.8	38
7	Sandy Bay	18	7	11	0	1785	2041	87.5	28
8	Devonport	18	4	12	2	1608	1925	83.5	20
9	South Launceston	18	3	14	1	1301	2083	62.5	14
10	New Norfolk	18	2	14	2	1630	2437	66.9	12

=== Round 1 ===
(Saturday, 1 April 1989)

- Clarence 29.13 (187) v Nth Hobart 14.14 (98) – Att: 2,481 at North Hobart Oval
- Sandy Bay 18.23 (131) v Burnie Hawks 15.16 (106) – Att: 1,110 at Queenborough Oval
- Glenorchy 18.16 (124) v New Norfolk 12.8 (80) – Att: 1,817 at Boyer Oval
- Sth Launceston 16.14 (110) v Hobart 12.13 (85) – Att: 834 at Youngtown Memorial Ground
- Nth Launceston 7.8 (50) v Devonport 5.7 (37) – Att: 1,325 at Devonport Oval

=== Round 2 ===
(Saturday, 8 April 1989)

- Hobart 29.13 (187) v New Norfolk 11.14 (80) – Att: 1,513 at North Hobart Oval
- Nth Hobart 19.16 (130) v Glenorchy 7.8 (50) – Att: 2,543 at KGV Football Park
- Clarence 16.13 (109) v Devonport 15.19 (109) – Att: 1,895 at Bellerive Oval

This was the first draw in TFL Statewide League history, with the most recent in the TANFL having occurred a combined 407 games earlier in the 1983 First-Semi-Final between Sandy Bay and Clarence. The previous roster round draw was in 1980 between Glenorchy and North Hobart.

- Sandy Bay 22.13 (145) v Nth Launceston 17.15 (117) – Att: 1,964 at York Park
- Burnie Hawks 23.23 (161) v Sth Launceston 12.5 (77) – Att: 1,161 at West Park Oval

=== Round 3 ===
(Saturday, 15 April 1989)

- Nth Hobart 29.11 (185) v Hobart 16.14 (110) – Att: 2,668 at North Hobart Oval
- Nth Launceston 19.19 (133) v Clarence 13.10 (88) – Att: 1,855 at Bellerive Oval
- Burnie Hawks 28.13 (181) v New Norfolk 11.12 (78) – Att: 1,064 at Boyer Oval
- Sandy Bay 16.14 (110) v Sth Launceston 8.15 (63) – Att: 816 at Youngtown Memorial Ground
- Glenorchy 14.16 (100) v Devonport 10.10 (70) – Att: 2,031 at Devonport Oval

=== Round 4 ===
(Saturday, 22 April & Sunday, 23 April 1989)

- Hobart 20.9 (129) v Devonport 17.19 (121) – Att: 1,374 at North Hobart Oval
- Clarence 17.10 (112) v Glenorchy 16.15 (111) – Att: 3,100 at KGV Football Park
- Nth Hobart 20.18 (138) v Burnie Hawks 20.12 (132) – Att: 1,901 at West Park Oval
- Sandy Bay 15.20 (110) v New Norfolk 12.13 (85) – Att: 1,424 at North Hobart Oval (Sunday)
- Sth Launceston 15.14 (104) v Nth Launceston 14.19 (103) – Att: 2,987 at York Park (Sunday)

=== Round 5 ===
(Tuesday, 25 April & Saturday, 29 April 1989)

- Burnie Hawks 14.18 (102) v Devonport 11.16 (82) – Att: 4,046 at Devonport Oval (Tuesday)
- Nth Hobart 22.21 (153) v Sandy Bay 6.10 (46) – Att: 2,974 at North Hobart Oval
- Hobart 18.13 (121) v Clarence 14.15 (99) – Att: 2,165 at Bellerive Oval
- New Norfolk 12.16 (88) v Sth Launceston 12.16 (88) – Att: 955 at Boyer Oval
- Nth Launceston 18.22 (130) v Glenorchy 13.5 (83) – Att: 1,803 at York Park

=== Round 6 ===
(Saturday, 6 May 1989)

- Glenorchy 15.22 (112) v Hobart 12.15 (87) – Att: 3,056 at North Hobart Oval
- Devonport 15.26 (116) v Sandy Bay 8.13 (61) – Att: 1,059 at Queenborough Oval
- Nth Launceston 20.11 (131) v New Norfolk 14.14 (98) – Att: 1,095 at Boyer Oval
- Nth Hobart 17.18 (120) v Sth Launceston 10.11 (71) – Att: 1,021 at Youngtown Memorial Ground
- Burnie Hawks 21.26 (152) v Clarence 19.12 (126) – Att: 1,724 at West Park Oval

=== Round 7 ===
(Saturday, 13 May 1989)

- Nth Hobart 24.19 (163) v New Norfolk 21.14 (140) – Att: 1,586 at North Hobart Oval
- Glenorchy 25.18 (168) v Burnie Hawks 11.16 (82) – Att: 2,058 at KGV Football Park
- Clarence 23.15 (153) v Sandy Bay 13.13 (91) – Att: 1,830 at Bellerive Oval
- Nth Launceston 14.23 (107) v Hobart 13.13 (91) – Att: 1,612 at York Park
- Devonport 21.17 (143) v Sth Launceston 14.15 (99) – Att: 1,529 at Devonport Oval

=== Round 8 ===
(Saturday, 20 May & Sunday, 21 May 1989)

- Nth Launceston 12.8 (80) v Nth Hobart 10.12 (72) – Att: 3,061 at North Hobart Oval
- New Norfolk 21.16 (142) v Devonport 10.13 (73) – Att: 1,108 at Boyer Oval
- Sth Launceston 19.18 (132) v Clarence 14.5 (89) – Att: 820 at Youngtown Memorial Ground
- Hobart 23.13 (151) v Burnie Hawks 14.9 (93) – Att: 1,481 at West Park Oval
- Glenorchy 18.13 (121) v Sandy Bay 15.8 (98) – Att: 1,942 at North Hobart Oval (Sunday)

=== Round 9 ===
(Saturday, 27 May 1989)

- Hobart 19.13 (127) v Sandy Bay 12.15 (87) – Att: 1,475 at North Hobart Oval
- Glenorchy 15.16 (106) v Sth Launceston 14.16 (100) – Att: 1,452 at KGV Football Park
- Clarence 17.9 (111) v New Norfolk 11.16 (82) – Att: 1,662 at Bellerive Oval
- Nth Launceston 16.16 (112) v Burnie Hawks 17.10 (112) – Att: 1,610 at York Park
- Nth Hobart 15.21 (111) v Devonport 14.7 (91) – Att: 1,485 at Devonport Oval

=== Round 10 ===
(Saturday, 3 June 1989)

- Hobart 25.19 (169) v Sth Launceston 5.9 (39) – Att: 1,131 at North Hobart Oval
- Glenorchy 23.20 (158) v New Norfolk 9.12 (66) – Att: 1,865 at KGV Football Park
- Clarence 19.14 (128) v Nth Hobart 15.15 (105) – Att: 2,633 at Bellerive Oval
- Nth Launceston 20.12 (132) v Devonport 15.12 (102) – Att: 1,801 at York Park
- Burnie Hawks 25.14 (164) v Sandy Bay 9.20 (74) – Att: 1,421 at West Park Oval

=== Round 11 ===
(Saturday, 17 June 1989)

- Nth Hobart 17.16 (118) v Glenorchy 11.13 (79) – Att: 2,208 at North Hobart Oval
- Nth Launceston 14.16 (100) v Sandy Bay 9.16 (70) – Att: 628 at Queenborough Oval
- Hobart 19.14 (128) v New Norfolk 13.7 (85) – Att: 838 at Boyer Oval
- Burnie Hawks 16.17 (113) v Sth Launceston 3.12 (30) – Att: 550 at Youngtown Memorial Ground
- Clarence 10.10 (70) v Devonport 6.11 (47) – Att: 836 at Devonport Oval

=== Round 12 ===
(Saturday, 24 June 1989)

- Hobart 19.12 (126) v Nth Hobart 17.18 (120) – Att: 2,221 at North Hobart Oval
- Sandy Bay 22.10 (142) v Sth Launceston 6.13 (49) – Att: 649 at Queenborough Oval
- Devonport 12.15 (87) v Glenorchy 10.16 (76) – Att: 1,344 at KGV Football Park
- Nth Launceston 21.8 (134) v Clarence 12.12 (84) – Att: 1,729 at York Park
- Burnie Hawks 29.23 (197) v New Norfolk 11.11 (77) – Att: 1,171 at West Park Oval

=== Round 13 ===
(Saturday, 8 July & Sunday, 9 July 1989)

- Nth Hobart 28.13 (181) v Burnie Hawks 21.10 (136) – Att: 1,706 at North Hobart Oval
- Glenorchy 16.8 (104) v Clarence 13.14 (92) – Att: 2,440 at Bellerive Oval
- Sandy Bay 15.15 (105) v New Norfolk 14.11 (95) – Att: 863 at Boyer Oval
- Hobart 8.14 (62) v Devonport 8.8 (56) – Att: 874 at Devonport Oval
- Nth Launceston 11.7 (73) v Sth Launceston 4.8 (32) – Att: 1,204 at Youngtown Memorial Ground (Sunday)

=== Split Round 14 & 15 ===
(Saturday, 15 July & Saturday, 22 July 1989)

- Hobart 12.21 (93) v Glenorchy 8.11 (59) – Att: 2,457 at KGV Football Park (15 July)
- Clarence 15.13 (103) v Burnie Hawks 15.12 (102) – Att: 1,409 at Bellerive Oval (15 July)
- Nth Launceston 19.20 (134) v New Norfolk 10.12 (72) – Att: 1,083 at York Park (15 July)
- Nth Hobart 19.18 (132) v Sth Launceston 9.10 (64) – Att: 1,163 at North Hobart Oval (22 July)
- Sandy Bay 13.17 (95) v Devonport 13.11 (89) – Att: 1,094 at Devonport Oval (22 July)

=== Split Round 14 & 15 (Continued) ===
(Saturday, 22 July. Saturday, 29 July & Sunday 30 July 1989)

- Glenorchy 12.10 (82) v Nth Launceston 8.11 (59) – Att: 1,875 a KGV Football Park (22 July)
- Clarence 21.13 (139) v Hobart 13.15 (93) – Att: 2,409 at North Hobart Oval (29 July)
- New Norfolk 13.5 (83) v Sth Launceston 8.8 (56) – Att: 470 at Youngtown Memorial Ground (29 July)
- Nth Hobart 22.12 (144) v Sandy Bay 16.14 (110) – Att: 2,077 at North Hobart Oval (30 July)
- Burnie Hawks 30.18 (198) v Devonport 18.15 (123) – Att: 2,540 at West Park Oval (30 July)

=== Round 16 ===
(Saturday, 5 August & Sunday, 6 August 1989)

- Hobart 22.9 (141) v Nth Launceston 21.13 (139) – Att: 1,684 at North Hobart Oval
- Nth Hobart 38.15 (243) v New Norfolk 11.11 (77) – Att: 1,074 at Boyer Oval
- Devonport 13.7 (85) v Sth Launceston 6.13 (49) – Att: 571 at Youngtown Memorial Ground
- Burnie Hawks 22.15 (147) v Glenorchy 17.15 (117) – Att: 1,624 at West Park Oval
- Clarence 17.20 (122) v Sandy Bay 15.13 (103) – Att: 1,898 at North Hobart Oval (Sunday)

=== Round 17 ===
(Saturday, 12 August 1989)

- Hobart 27.22 (184) v Burnie Hawks 13.13 (91) – Att: 1,570 at North Hobart Oval
- Glenorchy 16.25 (121) v Sandy Bay 15.14 (104) – Att: 1,580 at KGV Football Park
- Clarence 15.18 (108) v Sth Launceston 14.5 (89) – Att: 1,384 at Bellerive Oval
- Nth Launceston 13.20 (98) v Nth Hobart 8.14 (62) – Att: 3,931 at York Park
- Devonport 21.11 (137) v New Norfolk 20.17 (137) – Att: 993 at Devonport Oval

=== Round 18 ===
(Saturday, 19 August & Sunday, 20 August 1989)

- Nth Hobart 30.22 (202) v Devonport 5.11 (41) – Att: 1,610 at North Hobart Oval
- Clarence 16.14 (110) v New Norfolk 10.4 (64) – Att: 1,215 at Boyer Oval
- Nth Launceston 14.16 (100) v Burnie Hawks 9.13 (67) – Att: 1,530 at West Park Oval
- Glenorchy 27.12 (174) v Sth Launceston 7.8 (50) – Att: 714 at Youngtown Memorial Ground
- Hobart 17.14 (116) v Sandy Bay 15.13 (103) – Att: 1,503 at Queenborough Oval (Sunday)

=== Qualifying Final ===
(Saturday, 26 August 1989)

- Nth Hobart: 3.3 (21) | 6.6 (42) | 12.15 (87) | 19.22 (136)
- Hobart: 5.4 (34) | 10.5 (65) | 12.7 (79) | 16.9 (105)
- Attendance: 4,669 at North Hobart Oval

=== Elimination Final ===
(Sunday, 27 August 1989)

- Glenorchy: 4.1 (25) | 6.3 (39) | 13.6 (84) | 17.12 (114)
- Clarence: 5.2 (32) | 9.9 (63) | 12.12 (84) | 12.12 (84)
- Attendance: 6,425 at North Hobart Oval

=== First Semi Final ===
(Saturday, 2 September 1989)

- Hobart: 6.0 (36) | 11.2 (68) | 13.2 (80) | 20.5 (125)
- Glenorchy: 4.4 (28) | 9.8 (62) | 12.10 (82) | 14.12 (96)
- Attendance: 5,573 at North Hobart Oval

=== Second Semi Final ===
(Saturday, 2 September 1989)

- Nth Hobart: 3.4 (22) | 10.5 (65) | 16.7 (103) | 20.10 (130)
- Nth Launceston: 4.6 (30) | 5.9 (39) | 10.13 (73) | 14.18 (102)
- Attendance: 6,755 at York Park

=== Preliminary Final ===
(Saturday, 9 September 1989)

- Hobart Tigers: 1.3 (9) | 8.7 (55) | 13.12 (90) | 19.14 (128)
- Nth Launceston: 2.3 (15) | 4.6 (30) | 6.12 (48) | 12.15 (87)
- Attendance: 4,951 at North Hobart Oval

=== Grand Final ===
(Saturday, 16 September 1989) (ABC-TV highlights: 1989 TFL Grand Final)

- Nth Hobart: 0.8 (8) | 8.11 (59) | 14.17 (101) | 18.22 (130)
- Hobart: 6.1 (37) | 9.2 (56) | 12.3 (75) | 16.4 (100)
- Attendance: 16,528 at North Hobart Oval
