= 1965 TANFL season =

Australian rules football season

- Teams: Clarence Kangaroos; Glenorchy Magpies; Hobart Tigers; New Norfolk Eagles; North Hobart Robins; Sandy Bay Seagulls
- Premiers: Glenorchy
- Minor premiers: Glenorchy

Attendance
- Matches played: 61
- Total attendance: 292,932 (4,802 per match)

The 1965 Tasmanian Australian National Football League (TANFL) premiership season was an Australian Rules football competition staged in Hobart, Tasmania over nineteen (19) roster rounds and four (4) finals series matches between 3 April and 18 September 1965.

== Participating Clubs ==
- Clarence District Football Club
- Glenorchy District Football Club
- Hobart Football Club
- New Norfolk District Football Club
- North Hobart Football Club
- Sandy Bay Football Club

=== 1965 TANFL Club Coaches ===
- Geoff Frier (Clarence)
- Bobby Parsons (Glenorchy)
- Mal Pascoe (Hobart)
- Trevor Leo (New Norfolk)
- Dick Grimmond (North Hobart)
- Rex Geard (Sandy Bay)

=== TANFL Reserves Grand Final ===
- Sandy Bay 15.16 (106) v New Norfolk 10.12 (72) – North Hobart Oval

=== TANFL Under-19's Grand Final ===
(Saturday, 25 September 1965)

- New Norfolk 11.16 (82) v Glenorchy 6.9 (45) – North Hobart Oval

=== State Grand Final ===
(Saturday, 25 September 1965)

- Glenorchy: 0.7 (7) | 8.10 (58) | 10.13 (73) | 11.16 (82)
- Scottsdale: 1.4 (10) | 4.7 (31) | 7.8 (50) | 9.8 (62)
- Attendance: 13,762 at North Hobart Oval

Note: Glenorchy (TANFL guernsey) and Scottsdale (NTFA guernsey) wore alternate strips due to a guernseys clash.

=== Intrastate Matches ===
Jubilee Shield (Saturday, 1 May 1965)

- TANFL 18.10 (118) v NWFU 14.19 (103) – Att: 10,000 at West Park Oval

Jubilee Shield (Saturday, 5 June 1965)

- TANFL 14.20 (104) v NTFA 11.12 (78) – Att: 12,159 at North Hobart Oval

Inter-Association Match (Saturday, 26 June 1965)

- TANFL 13.14 (92) v Huon FA 12.12 (84) – Att: 12,356 at North Hobart Oval (Interstate Curtain-Raiser)

=== Interstate Match ===
Interstate Match (Saturday, 26 June 1965)

- South Australia 14.24 (108) v Tasmania 16.6 (102) – Att: 12,356 at North Hobart Oval

Interstate Matches (Sunday, 18 July 1965)

- Victorian FA 12.11 (83) v Tasmania 11.10 (76) – Att: 10,000 at Toorak Park, Melbourne.

=== Leading Goalkickers: TANFL ===
- Peter Hudson (New Norfolk) – 110

=== Medal Winners ===
- Burnie Payne (Hobart) – William Leitch Medal
- Ken Latham (New Norfolk) – George Watt Medal (Reserves)
- Royce Hart (Clarence) – V.A Geard Medal (Under-19's)
- Max McMahon (Glenorchy) & Danny Jones (Sandy Bay) – Weller Arnold Medal (Best player/s in Intrastate matches)

== 1965 TANFL Ladder ==
Pos	Team	Pld	W	L	D	PF	PA	PP	Pts
1	Glenorchy	19	12	6	1	1350	1326	101.8	50
2	New Norfolk	19	12	7	0	1597	1320	121.0	48
3	North Hobart	19	10	8	1	1444	1424	101.4	42
4	Hobart	19	10	9	0	1423	1452	98.0	40
5	Clarence	19	8	11	0	1464	1466	99.9	32
6	Sandy Bay	19	4	15	0	1437	1717	83.7	16

=== Round 1 ===
(Saturday, 3 April 1965)

- Nth Hobart 7.16 (58) v Glenorchy 7.16 (58) – Att: 5,729 at North Hobart Oval
- Hobart 13.16 (94) v Clarence 8.11 (59) – Att: 4,204 at TCA Ground
- New Norfolk 15.11 (101) v Sandy Bay 13.9 (87) – Att: 4,390 at Queenborough Oval

=== Round 2 ===
(Saturday, 10 April 1965)

- Clarence 9.19 (73) v Sandy Bay 7.12 (54) – Att: 5,691 at North Hobart Oval
- Glenorchy 10.12 (72) v Hobart 9.13 (67) – Att: 4,042 at KGV Park
- Nth Hobart 7.10 (52) v New Norfolk 7.7 (49) – Att: 3,791 at Boyer Oval

=== Round 3 ===
(Saturday, 17 April & Monday, 19 April 1965)

- Hobart 8.17 (65) v New Norfolk 9.7 (61) – Att: 5,164 at North Hobart Oval
- Glenorchy 6.15 (51) v Clarence 3.7 (25) – Att: 3,732 at Bellerive Oval
- Sandy Bay 7.10 (52) v Nth Hobart 4.12 (36) – Att: 7,976 at North Hobart Oval (Monday)

=== Round 4 ===
(Saturday, 24 April 1965)

- Glenorchy 13.16 (94) v New Norfolk 12.6 (78) – Att: 5,835 at North Hobart Oval
- Hobart 14.18 (102) v Sandy Bay 11.11 (77) – Att: 3,865 at TCA Ground
- Clarence 15.12 (102) v Nth Hobart 11.9 (75) – Att: 3,323 at Bellerive Oval

=== Round 5 ===
(Saturday, 1 May 1965)

- Nth Hobart 15.18 (108) v Hobart 10.10 (70) – Att: 4,295 at North Hobart Oval
- Glenorchy 13.14 (92) v Sandy Bay 10.8 (68) – Att: 3,848 at Queenborough Oval
- Clarence 8.11 (59) v New Norfolk 6.8 (44) – Att: 3,038 at Boyer Oval

=== Round 6 ===
(Saturday, 8 May 1965)

- Hobart 11.17 (83) v Clarence 7.13 (55) – Att: 4,283 at North Hobart Oval
- Glenorchy 13.11 (89) v Nth Hobart 9.9 (63) – Att: 3,849 at KGV Park
- New Norfolk 13.10 (88) v Sandy Bay 8.14 (62) – Att: 2,465 at Boyer Oval

=== Round 7 ===
(Saturday, 15 May 1965)

- Nth Hobart 15.15 (105) v New Norfolk 14.5 (89) – Att: 4,637 at North Hobart Oval
- Hobart 15.17 (107) v Glenorchy 12.12 (84) – Att: 4,809 at TCA Ground
- Sandy Bay 15.18 (108) v Clarence 12.11 (83) – Att: 3,431 at Bellerive Oval

=== Round 8 ===
(Saturday, 22 May 1965)

- Glenorchy 9.18 (72) v Clarence 9.10 (64) – Att: 4,838 at North Hobart Oval
- Nth Hobart 18.6 (114) v Sandy Bay 8.11 (59) – Att: 3,403 at Queenborough Oval
- New Norfolk 11.8 (74) v Hobart 7.8 (50) – Att: 2,674 at Boyer Oval

=== Round 9 ===
(Saturday, 29 May 1965)

- Clarence 15.11 (101) v Nth Hobart 9.13 (67) – Att: 5,120 at North Hobart Oval
- Glenorchy 11.12 (78) v New Norfolk 9.13 (67) – Att: 5,374 at KGV Park
- Sandy Bay 13.17 (95) v Hobart 11.5 (71) – Att: 3,468 at Queenborough Oval

=== Round 10 ===
(Saturday, 12 June & Monday, 14 June 1965)

- Glenorchy 10.11 (71) v Sandy Bay 10.9 (69) – Att: 6,717 at North Hobart Oval
- Nth Hobart 13.12 (90) v Hobart 7.16 (58) – Att: 3,110 at TCA Ground
- New Norfolk 15.12 (102) v Clarence 12.18 (90) – Att: 7,981 at North Hobart Oval (Monday)

=== Round 11 ===
(Saturday, 19 June 1965)

- New Norfolk 12.21 (93) v Sandy Bay 10.7 (67) – Att: 5,286 at North Hobart Oval
- Glenorchy 5.9 (39) v Nth Hobart 2.12 (24) – Att: 3,988 at KGV Park
- Hobart 8.17 (65) v Clarence 7.11 (53) – Att: 2,699 at Bellerive Oval

=== Round 12 ===
(Saturday, 3 July 1965)

- Hobart 13.14 (92) v Glenorchy 10.19 (79) – Att: 5,162 at North Hobart Oval
- Clarence 14.11 (95) v Sandy Bay 12.12 (84) – Att: 3,465 at Queenborough Oval
- New Norfolk 14.12 (96) v Nth Hobart 8.12 (60) – Att: 2,906 at Boyer Oval

=== Round 13 ===
(Saturday, 10 July 1965)

- Nth Hobart 14.16 (100) v Sandy Bay 14.15 (99) – Att: 3,913 at North Hobart Oval
- New Norfolk 16.13 (109) v Hobart 13.17 (95) – Att: 3,522 at TCA Ground
- Glenorchy 12.17 (89) v Clarence 10.4 (64) – Att: 3,901 at KGV Park

=== Round 14 ===
(Saturday, 17 July 1965)

- Hobart 10.18 (78) v Sandy Bay 11.11 (77) – Att: 3,862 at North Hobart Oval
- Nth Hobart 18.13 (121) v Clarence 13.5 (83) – Att: 2,417 at Bellerive Oval
- New Norfolk 13.9 (87) v Glenorchy 6.9 (45) – Att: 2,944 at Boyer Oval

=== Round 15 ===
(Saturday, 24 July 1965)

- Hobart 14.16 (100) v Nth Hobart 7.12 (54) – Att: 4,897 at North Hobart Oval
- Sandy Bay 10.12 (72) v Glenorchy 9.16 (70) – Att: 2,884 at Queenborough Oval
- New Norfolk 8.11 (59) v Clarence 5.19 (49) – Att: 3,023 at Bellerive Oval

=== Round 16 ===
(Saturday, 31 July 1965)

- Glenorchy 10.10 (70) v Nth Hobart 8.13 (61) – Att: 4,771 at North Hobart Oval
- Clarence 15.15 (105) v Hobart 13.11 (89) – Att: 2,752 at TCA Ground
- New Norfolk 14.19 (103) v Sandy Bay 9.14 (68) – Att: 3,625 at Queenborough Oval

=== Round 17 ===
(Saturday, 7 August 1965)

- Nth Hobart 12.7 (79) v New Norfolk 9.10 (64) – Att: 4,509 at North Hobart Oval
- Glenorchy 9.7 (61) v Hobart 6.12 (48) – Att: 3,874 at KGV Park
- Clarence 16.12 (108) v Sandy Bay 7.18 (60) – Att: 2,147 at Bellerive Oval

=== Round 18 ===
(Saturday, 14 August 1965)

- Clarence 19.8 (122) v Glenorchy 10.15 (75) – Att: 5,786 at North Hobart Oval
- Nth Hobart 13.23 (101) v Sandy Bay 10.12 (72) – Att: 2,489 at Queenborough Oval
- New Norfolk 20.12 (132) v Hobart 7.12 (54) – Att: 3,239 at Boyer Oval

=== Round 19 ===
(Saturday, 21 August 1965)

- Nth Hobart 10.14 (74) v Clarence 10.13 (73) – Att: 6,073 at North Hobart Oval
- Hobart 18.27 (135) v Sandy Bay 16.11 (107) – Att: 2,440 at TCA Ground
- New Norfolk 15.10 (100) v Glenorchy 9.7 (61) – Att: 3,475 at Boyer Oval *

Note: Peter Hudson (New Norfolk) kicks his 100th goal for the season.

=== First Semi Final ===
(Saturday, 28 August 1965)

- Nth Hobart: 4.5 (29) | 6.7 (43) | 9.13 (67) | 11.14 (80)
- Hobart: 3.4 (22) | 6.5 (41) | 9.8 (62) | 10.12 (72)
- Attendance: 11,085 at North Hobart Oval

=== Second Semi Final ===
(Saturday, 4 September 1965)

- Glenorchy: 5.6 (36) | 6.13 (49) | 8.18 (66) | 10.20 (80)
- New Norfolk: 1.2 (8) | 1.12 (18) | 2.14 (26) | 5.16 (46)
- Attendance: 14,438 at North Hobart Oval

=== Preliminary Final ===
(Saturday, 11 September 1965)

- Nth Hobart: 3.2 (20) | 5.6 (36) | 9.8 (62) | 15.8 (98)
- New Norfolk: 6.4 (40) | 11.4 (70) | 12.7 (79) | 15.7 (97)
- Attendance: 13,730 at North Hobart Oval

=== Grand Final ===
(Saturday, 18 September 1965)

- Glenorchy: 3.3 (21) | 5.7 (37) | 6.8 (44) | 10.15 (75)
- Nth Hobart: 4.1 (25) | 5.1 (31) | 5.8 (38) | 6.8 (44)
- Attendance: 18,548 at North Hobart Oval

Source: All scores and statistics courtesy of the Hobart Mercury and Saturday Evening Mercury (SEM) publications.
