= 1984 TANFL season =

Australian rules football season

- Teams: Clarence Kangaroos; Glenorchy Magpies; Hobart Tigers; New Norfolk Eagles; North Hobart Demons; Sandy Bay Seagulls
- Premiers: Clarence
- Minor premiers: Glenorchy; 8th minor premiership

Attendance
- Matches played: 64
- Total attendance: 144,888 (2,264 per match)

The 1984 Tasmanian Australian National Football League (TANFL) premiership season was an Australian rules football competition staged in Hobart, Tasmania over twenty roster rounds and four finals series matches between 31 March and 22 September 1984.

The League was known as the Winfield League under a commercial naming-rights sponsorship agreement with Winfield tobacco company.

== Participating Clubs ==
- Clarence District Football Club
- Glenorchy District Football Club
- Hobart Football Club
- New Norfolk District Football Club.
- North Hobart Football Club
- Sandy Bay Football Club

=== 1984 TANFL Club Coaches ===
- Robert Shaw (Clarence)
- Garry Davidson (Glenorchy)
- Scott Wade (Hobart)
- Graham Hunnibell (New Norfolk)
- Darryl Sutton (North Hobart)
- Paul Sproule (Sandy Bay)

=== Midas Mufflers League (Reserves) Grand Final ===
- Glenorchy 16.11 (107) v Clarence 10.15 (75) – North Hobart Oval

=== Dux Hotwater Systems League (Under-19s) Grand Final ===
- Hobart 16.9 (105) v Sandy Bay 6.17 (53) – North Hobart Oval

=== Interstate Matches ===
Escort Shield (Saturday, 28 April 1984)

- Tasmania 24.12 (156) v ACT 14.16 (100) – Att: 5,502 at North Hobart Oval

Escort Shield (Sunday, 20 May 1984)

- Tasmania 14.10 (94) v New South Wales 11.7 (73) – Att: 700 at Erskineville Oval, Sydney

Escort Shield Grand Final (Saturday, 30 June 1984)

- Queensland 16.15 (111) v Tasmania 13.12 (90) – Att: 6,840 at North Hobart Oval

=== Intrastate Matches ===
Winfield Intrastate Series (Saturday, 9 June 1984)

- TANFL 27.13 (175) v NWFU 13.12 (90) – Att: 7,115 at North Hobart Oval

Winfield Intrastate Series (Sunday, 10 June 1984)

- NTFA 20.12 (132) v NWFU 17.16 (118) – Att: 1,724 at KGV Football Park

Winfield Intrastate Series (Monday, 11 June 1984)

- TANFL 29.14 (188) v NTFA 10.12 (72) – Att: 5,085 at North Hobart Oval

=== Leading Goalkickers: TANFL ===
- Wayne Fox (New Norfolk) – 93
- Garry Davidson (Glenorchy) – 63
- Darryl Sutton (North Hobart) – 56
- Glenn Goss (Glenorchy) – 53

=== Medal Winners ===
- Scott Wade (Hobart) – William Leitch Medal
- Victor Di Venuto (North Hobart) – George Watt Medal (Reserves)
- Craig Randall (Hobart) – V.A Geard Medal (Under-19s)
- Brendon Mayne (Clarence) – D.R Plaister Medal (Under-17s)

== Season summary ==
In what was one of the most even seasons in TANFL history, all six clubs were within striking distance of a top-three berth at various stages during the season.

Glenorchy swept all before them during the minor rounds and led the competition by five games (20 points) over their bitterest rival, second placed Clarence - alarmingly for the Magpies, two of their three losses during the season came at the hands of Clarence who they were to fall to twice in the finals.

Hobart, despite finishing on the bottom for the third successive season had been sitting in the top three midway through the season after finding some great form, but after the loss of key players to suspension and injury (including inspirational Captain-Coach and the season's William Leitch Medalist Scott Wade), the Tigers slumped to a 91-point loss to an inconsistent North Hobart side and incredibly, sank to the bottom, finishing with the wooden spoon with six wins, only two wins from a finals spot.

Sandy Bay under four-time premiership coach Paul Sproule started the season in magnificent touch but suffered from a disastrous mid-season slump and barely regained form, needing a win in the final round of the season to make the Four, the Seagulls were thumped by Glenorchy and New Norfolk were able to sneak into the finals at their expense with a commanding 70-point win at Bellerive against the eventual premier, Clarence.

The form lines of the two Grand Finalists (Glenorchy & Clarence) in the stretch to the finals could not have been more marked.

Glenorchy sat pretty atop the table winning its final nine roster matches in succession (and 37 out of their previous 40 matches since 1983) while its opponent, Clarence, had won just two out of their final seven (both narrow wins against bottom side Hobart).

In the Second Semi Final in wet conditions, Glenorchy looked to be cruising home to another Grand Final at halftime, but the Roos' eventually found some form and shocked the Magpies to boot nine out of the last eleven goals of the game to cruise through to the Grand Final.

Darryl Sutton's North Hobart "Mean Machine" (a theme the club carried through their 1984 campaign) had high hopes of breaking their premiership hoodoo which stretched back to 1974, starting with demolishing New Norfolk in the First Semi Final which included a sensational 12-goal haul from Demons Captain–Coach Darryl Sutton, the Demons were confident of beating Glenorchy for a shot at Clarence for the flag, but the Magpies under coach Garry Davidson had other ideas and used their vast finals experience to their advantage and were untroubled all day in making it through to the Grand Final with a 31-point victory.

The Grand Final was a tight affair, the Roos getting the jump on Glenorchy in the first quarter, but the next two-quarters the game became a close, hard and tough battle.

The Clarence team, leading by two-points at the final change, saved its best for last and ran away with a five-goal to one final quarter to upset Glenorchy by 26 points, reviving nightmares of 1979 for Glenorchy who, in that year also were beaten by Clarence despite finishing well out on top.

Coach Robert Shaw was a jubilant man as he held the M.A.S McNeair Trophy aloft to signify Clarence's fourth premiership victory since their admittance to the League in 1947.

== 1984 TANFL Ladder ==
Pos	Team	Pld	W	L	D	PF	PA	PP	Pts
1	Glenorchy	20	17	3	0	2168	1746	124.2	68
2	Clarence	20	12	8	0	1970	1773	111.1	48
3	North Hobart	20	9	11	0	2013	2071	97.2	36
4	New Norfolk	20	8	12	0	1907	1827	104.4	32
5	Sandy Bay	20	8	12	0	1828	2179	83.9	32
6	Hobart	20	6	14	0	1735	2125	81.6	24

=== Round 1 ===
(Saturday, 31 March 1984)

- Nth Hobart 24.11 (155) v New Norfolk 17.11 (113) – Att: 2,622 at North Hobart Oval
- Hobart 10.19 (79) v Sandy Bay 9.14 (68) – Att: 1,220 at KGV Football Park
- Glenorchy 18.15 (123) v Clarence 12.4 (76) – Att: 2,622 at Bellerive Oval

=== Round 2 ===
(Saturday, 7 April 1984)

- Sandy Bay 13.18 (96) v Clarence 13.15 (93) – Att: 2,149 at North Hobart Oval
- Glenorchy 18.18 (126) v Nth Hobart 12.13 (85) – Att: 3,677 at KGV Football Park
- New Norfolk 23.18 (156) v Hobart 10.8 (68) – Att: 1,512 at Boyer Oval

=== Round 3 ===
(Saturday, 14 April 1984)

- Sandy Bay 20.13 (133) v New Norfolk 15.10 (100) – Att: 1,811 at North Hobart Oval
- Glenorchy 15.20 (110) v Hobart 10.15 (75) – Att: 1,806 at KGV Football Park
- Clarence 15.18 (108) v Nth Hobart 12.12 (84) – Att: 2,601 at Bellerive Oval

=== Round 4 ===
(Saturday, 21 April 1984)

- Sandy Bay 20.10 (130) v Nth Hobart 16.11 (107) – Att: 1,964 at North Hobart Oval
- Glenorchy 19.10 (124) v New Norfolk 18.12 (120) – Att: 3,214 at KGV Football Park
- Clarence 25.16 (166) v Hobart 10.11 (71) – Att: 1,572 at Bellerive Oval

=== Round 5 ===
(Wednesday, 25 April 1984)

- Sandy Bay 20.18 (138) v Glenorchy 14.16 (100) – Att: 2,601 at North Hobart Oval
- Nth Hobart 14.14 (98) v Hobart 11.16 (82) – Att: 1,551 at KGV Football Park
- Clarence 14.12 (96) v New Norfolk 9.9 (63) – Att: 1,621 at Boyer Oval

=== Round 6 ===
(Saturday, 5 May 1984)

- Sandy Bay 18.22 (130) v Hobart 13.12 (90) – Att: 1,436 at North Hobart Oval
- Clarence 18.10 (118) v Glenorchy 10.8 (68) – Att: 3,247 at KGV Football Park
- New Norfolk 20.6 (126) v Nth Hobart 11.18 (84) – Att: 1,528 at Boyer Oval

=== Round 7 ===
(Saturday, 12 May 1984)

- Glenorchy 20.18 (138) v Nth Hobart 13.10 (88) – Att: 2,289 at North Hobart Oval
- New Norfolk 13.18 (96) v Hobart 11.9 (75) – Att: 1,030 at KGV Football Park
- Clarence 19.14 (128) v Sandy Bay 12.10 (82) – Att: 2,737 at Bellerive Oval

=== Round 8 ===
(Saturday, 19 May 1984)

- Clarence 23.8 (146) v Nth Hobart 19.15 (129) – Att: 2,412 at North Hobart Oval
- Glenorchy 13.20 (98) v Hobart 14.11 (95) – Att: 1,596 at KGV Football Park
- New Norfolk 16.18 (114) v Sandy Bay 12.14 (86) – Att: 1,400 at Boyer Oval

=== Round 9 ===
(Saturday, 26 May 1984)

- Nth Hobart 14.11 (95) v Sandy Bay 9.11 (65) – Att: 2,002 at North Hobart Oval
- Hobart 6.12 (48) v Clarence 6.11 (47) – Att: 1,388 at KGV Football Park
- Glenorchy 9.6 (60) v New Norfolk 7.9 (51) – Att: 1,596 at Boyer Oval

=== Round 10 ===
(Saturday, 2 June 1984)

- Hobart 24.14 (158) v Nth Hobart 12.15 (87) – Att: 1,871 at North Hobart Oval
- Glenorchy 28.15 (183) v Sandy Bay 12.16 (88) – Att: 2,113 at KGV Football Park
- Clarence 11.22 (88) v New Norfolk 10.10 (70) – Att: 2,258 at Bellerive Oval

=== Round 11 ===
(Saturday, 16 June 1984)

- Nth Hobart 8.11 (59) v New Norfolk 7.9 (51) – Att: 1,768 at North Hobart Oval
- Hobart 17.7 (109) v Sandy Bay 6.18 (54) – Att: 1,114 at KGV Football Park
- Clarence 9.9 (63) v Glenorchy 7.11 (53) – Att: 2,730 at Bellerive Oval

=== Round 12 ===
(Saturday, 23 June 1984)

- Clarence 24.16 (160) v Sandy Bay 12.14 (86) – Att: 2,029 at North Hobart Oval
- Glenorchy 12.19 (91) v Nth Hobart 12.9 (81) – Att: 2,291 at KGV Football Park
- Hobart 17.11 (113) v New Norfolk 11.15 (81) – Att: 1,413 at Boyer Oval

=== Round 13 ===
(Saturday, 7 July 1984)

- Sandy Bay 20.15 (135) v New Norfolk 19.10 (124) – Att: 1,443 at North Hobart Oval
- Glenorchy 23.18 (156) v Hobart 16.10 (106) – Att: 2,045 at KGV Football Park
- Clarence 26.13 (169) v Nth Hobart 15.14 (104) – Att: 2,054 at Bellerive Oval

=== Round 14 ===
(Saturday, 14 July 1984)

- Nth Hobart 18.10 (118) v Sandy Bay 11.16 (82) – Att: 1,518 at North Hobart Oval
- Glenorchy 17.7 (109) v New Norfolk 13.13 (91) – Att: 1,870 at KGV Football Park
- Clarence 18.16 (124) v Hobart 18.9 (117) – Att: 1,779 at Bellerive Oval

=== Round 15 ===
(Saturday, 21 July 1984)

- Glenorchy 20.27 (147) v Sandy Bay 12.12 (84) – Att: 1,827 at North Hobart Oval
- Nth Hobart 25.21 (171) v Hobart 11.14 (80) – Att: 1,419 at KGV Football Park
- New Norfolk 13.16 (94) v Clarence 9.8 (62) – Att: 1,743 at Boyer Oval

=== Round 16 ===
(Saturday, 28 July 1984)

- Sandy Bay 9.17 (71) v Hobart 8.5 (53) – Att: 990 at North Hobart Oval
- Glenorchy 9.12 (66) v Clarence 6.3 (39) – Att: 1,817 at KGV Football Park
- Nth Hobart 11.6 (72) v New Norfolk 10.11 (71) – Att: 1,419 at Boyer Oval

=== Round 17 ===
(Saturday, 4 August 1984)

- Glenorchy 13.14 (92) v Nth Hobart 12.7 (79) – Att: 2,109 at North Hobart Oval
- New Norfolk 15.13 (103) v Hobart 12.10 (82) – Att: 1,001 at KGV Football Park
- Sandy Bay 14.7 (91) v Clarence 8.11 (59) – Att: 1,613 at Bellerive Oval

=== Round 18 ===
(Saturday, 11 August 1984)

- Nth Hobart 11.11 (77) v Clarence 6.2 (38) – Att: 1,285 at North Hobart Oval
- Glenorchy 16.7 (103) v Hobart 4.7 (31) – Att: 1,014 at KGV Football Park
- New Norfolk 8.9 (57) v Sandy Bay 7.5 (47) – Att: 924 at Boyer Oval

=== Round 19 ===
(Saturday, 18 August 1984)

- Nth Hobart 22.6 (138) v Sandy Bay 14.10 (94) – Att: 2,089 at North Hobart Oval
- Clarence 15.15 (105) v Hobart 15.9 (99) – Att: 1,175 at KGV Football Park
- Glenorchy 15.7 (97) v New Norfolk 10.15 (75) – Att: 1,823 at Boyer Oval

=== Round 20 ===
(Saturday, 25 August 1984)

- Hobart 16.7 (103) v Nth Hobart 15.12 (102) – Att: 1,618 at North Hobart Oval
- Glenorchy 17.22 (124) v Sandy Bay 9.8 (62) – Att: 1,895 at KGV Football Park
- New Norfolk 23.14 (152) v Clarence 12.10 (82) – Att: 2,001 at Bellerive Oval

=== First Semi Final ===
(Saturday, 1 September 1984)

- Nth Hobart: 7.4 (46) | 12.6 (78) | 14.10 (94) | 21.11 (137)
- New Norfolk: 1.3 (9) | 1.7 (13) | 6.9 (45) | 13.12 (90)
- Attendance: 5,698 at North Hobart Oval

=== Second Semi Final ===
(Saturday, 8 September 1984)

- Clarence: 0.3 (3) | 2.5 (17) | 6.9 (45) | 11.12 (78)
- Glenorchy: 2.8 (20) | 5.9 (39) | 6.10 (46) | 7.11 (53)
- Attendance: 5,136 at North Hobart Oval

=== Preliminary Final ===
(Saturday, 15 September 1984)

- Glenorchy: 3.4 (22) | 7.5 (47) | 13.8 (86) | 16.10 (106)
- Nth Hobart: 1.4 (10) | 3.6 (24) | 8.9 (57) | 10.15 (75)
- Attendance: 8,066 at North Hobart Oval

=== Grand Final ===
(Saturday, 22 September 1984)

- Clarence: 4.3 (27) | 5.7 (37) | 8.10 (58) | 13.13 (91)
- Glenorchy: 1.2 (8) | 4.6 (30) | 8.8 (56) | 9.11 (65)
- Attendance: 14,664 at North Hobart Oval
