= NHCC =

NHCC may refer to:

- North Hennepin Community College
- Lone Star College System (formerly North Harris County College)
- New Hope Christian College
- National Hispanic Cultural Center
- North Hobart Cricket Club
- National Housing and Construction Company, a Ugandan company
