= DOSA Football Club =

DOSA

Names
- Full name: Dominic Old Scholars Association Football Club
- Nickname(s): Roosters

2025 season
- After finals: 1st

Club details
- Founded: 1976
- Colours: Maroon Yellow
- Competition: Old Scholars Football Association.
- Premierships: 1984, 1986, 1987, 1994, 1995, 1999, 2013, 2018, 2019, 2025
- Ground(s): TCA Ground

The Dominic Old Scholars Association Football Club is an Australian Rules Football team currently based in Hobart, Tasmania. It is a member of the Old Scholars Football Association.

== Club History ==
Founded

The Dominic Old Scholars Association Football Club was founded as an old scholars team from the Dominic College in Glenorchy, Tasmania in 1976 where it commenced fielding a side in the Thirds competition before fielding a full senior side in 1978.
DOSA, nicknamed the Roosters, were a member of the Tasmanian Amateur Football League (Southern Amateurs) from 1976 to 1980.
When the TAFL Old Scholars Division was formed in the Southern Amateurs in 1981 they continued on in that division until 1986 collecting premiership victories in 1984 and 1986.
In 1987 the Old Scholars clubs formed a breakaway competition known as the Old Scholars Football Association in which DOSA continues to participate in to this day.
They have eight senior premierships in their thirty-nine seasons of participation in the OSFA, taking home the 1987, 1994, 1995, 1999, 2013, 2018, 2019 and 2025 premierships, they have also participated in numerous losing grand finals over that duration.
In forty-eight seasons of senior football the Roosters have taken home the senior premiership title on ten occasions from twenty grand final appearances between 1984 and 2025.

Home Grounds

DOSA have had four home grounds during their years of existence.

They played their home matches at the Dominic College Football Ground in Tolosa Street, Glenorchy from 1976-2005 until they were forced to move from the venue.
In 2006 the club began playing their matches at Cadbury's Oval (St Anne's Cricket Club Ground) in Claremont but after finding the venue to be unsuitable, they left the ground at the end of the 2009 season and began playing their home matches at North Hobart Oval where they were to set up their clubrooms and administration base in the Doug Plaister Stand.
At the end of the 2013 season DOSA was once again forced to move after AFL Tasmania decided to base the then new TSL entity (Hobart City Demons) in the Sir Doug Plaister Stand and to give North Hobart's playing surface a rest during the wetter months and this forced the club to groundshare the TCA Ground with Hobart Football Club from 2014 onwards.

=== TAFL Old Scholars Division (1981–1986) ===
Senior Premiership Titles (2)
● 1984, 1986

Senior Runner-Up
● Nil

=== Old Scholars Football Association (1987–) ===
Senior Premiership Titles (8)
● 1987, 1994, 1995, 1999, 2013, 2018, 2019, 2025

Senior Runner-Up (10)
● 1997, 1998, 2004, 2005, 2007, 2012, 2014, 2015, 2022, 2024

Peter Fitzgerald Medal winners (OSFA Best & Fairest)
● 1986 — Wayne Olding
● 1989 — Tony Zeltzen
● 1992 — Wayne Olding
● 1995 — Matthew Honey
● 1998 — Matthew Honey
● 2004 — D.McConnon
● 2012 — Ben Setchell
● 2013 — Ben Setchell
● 2016 — Michael Fisher

=== Team of the Century ===
Backs

- Rick Honey, Tom Jarvis

Half backs

- Paul Curtain, M.Johnston, Scott Badenach

Centres

- Craig Scott, Matthew Honner, Paul Whitmore

Half forwards

- Bruce Payne, Blair Brownless, Chris Robinson

Forwards

- Wayne Veitch, Wayne Olding, Matthew Honey

1st Ruck

- Anthony Zeitzen, Michael Bowden, Rodney Scott

Interchange

- Mark Young, Kieran Dooley, Sonny Azzopardi, Todd Curtain

Coach

- Wayne Olding
