= Keith Browning (footballer) =

Australian rules footballer

Personal information
- Full name: Keith Joseph Browning
- Born: 5 February 1933
- Died: 2 November 2013 (aged 80)
- Original team: South Melbourne Tech
- Height: 175 cm (5 ft 9 in)
- Weight: 76 kg (168 lb)

Playing career^{1}
Years	Club	Games (Goals)
1951–1954	South Melbourne	53 (4)
- ^{1} Playing statistics correct to the end of 1954.

Keith Joseph Browning (5 February 1933 – 2 November 2013) was an Australian rules footballer who played with South Melbourne in the Victorian Football League (VFL).

Browning, a centreman and half forward, made his league debut for South Melbourne in 1951, after starting the season in the thirds. He played 53 games at South Melbourne, from 1951 to 1954, then joined Latrobe Valley Football League club Trafalgar, as playing coach for two seasons From 1961 to 1967, Browning again coached Trafalgar and steered the club to a premiership in 1962.

He was the father of South Melbourne/Sydney player Mark Browning.
