= Bernie Waldron =

Australian rules footballer

Personal information
- Full name: Bernie Waldron
- Born: 20 March 1920
- Died: 20 December 1990 (aged 70)
- Original team: Burnley
- Height: 180 cm (5 ft 11 in)
- Weight: 80 kg (176 lb)
- Position: Centreman

Playing career^{1}
Years	Club	Games (Goals)
1940–45	Richmond	83 (22)
- ^{1} Playing statistics correct to the end of 1945.

Career highlights
- VFL premiership player: 1943

Bernie Waldron (20 March 1920 – 20 December 1990) was an Australian rules footballer who played for Richmond in the Victorian Football League (VFL) during the early 1940s.

Waldron appeared in ten finals with Richmond, four of them Grand Finals. A premiership player at Richmond in 1943, he was a Grand Final runner-up in 1940, 1942 and 1944. Waldron played a variety of positions in his career, but was used mostly as a centreman, half back flanker or on the half forward flank. In the 1941 VFL season he was involved in a collision which broke the leg of Carlton's Jack Hale and forced the rover to retire.

After leaving Richmond he played at Hobart and was a member of their 1950 premiership team, kicking an important behind in the dying seconds to break the deadlock. When the siren sounded, Hobart finished two points clear of New Town to claim their first ever premiership.
Waldron also topped the TANFL's goal-kicking in 1953 with 47 goals and is still the Hobart Football Club record-holder for most individual goals scored in a match with 15, booted in a TANFL match between Hobart and Clarence at the TCA Ground on 30 August 1952, also holding the record for the second highest individual goals scored in a match for Hobart with 14 goals, again against Clarence at the same venue on 22 July 1950.
