= Trevor Leo =

Australian rules footballer

Personal information
- Full name: Trevor John Leo
- Born: 29 August 1936 (age 90); Tasmania, Australia
- Original team: Cooee
- Position: Rover

Playing career^{1}
Years	Club	Games (Goals)
1953	Cooee	13 (3)
1954–61	Hobart	124
1962	Launceston	?
1963–68	New Norfolk	75
- ^{1} Playing statistics correct to the end of 1968.

Trevor John Leo (born 29 August 1936) is a former Australian rules footballer from Tasmania who played during the 1950s and 1960s and was chosen at state representative level.

Rover Trevor Leo came to Hobart from Cooee where he was a Best and fairest winner.

He made his Hobart debut in 1954 and was a member of their premiership side that year as well as in 1959 and 1960. His greatest individual achievement as a player was winning the William Leitch Medal in 1957 and he also won two Best and fairests while at Hobart.

In 1962 he was captain-coach of Launceston.

Leo joined New Norfolk in 1963 and was immediately appointed their captain-coach. In 1968 he steered the club to their inaugural TANFL/TFL premiership and also the Tasmanian State Premiership. He retired as a player following his 1968 triumphs but stayed on as coach for one more year. In 1974 he returned to Hobart where he was coach for the season.

On 18 occasions during his career he represented Tasmania at interstate football, including the 1956, 1958 and 1961 carnivals. He was Tasmania's coach at the 1966 Hobart and 1969 Adelaide Carnivals.

After his retirement from the game, Leo spent a few years as a member of the local ABC-TV football panel.

Trevor Leo was inducted into the Tasmanian Football Hall of Fame in 2005.
