= North Hobart Cricket Club =

- Founded: 1905
- Home ground: TCA Ground
- Colours: Red/Blue
- Head coach: Robb MacMillan
- Captain: Caleb Jewell
- TCA Titles: 20
- 2019–20: 4th

North Hobart Cricket Club also known as the "Demons" represent North Hobart in Tasmania's Grade Cricket Competition.

North Hobart Cricket Club was founded in 1905, and won the "A Grade" competition in their first season, quickly establishing themselves as a powerful club in the TCA competition winning more 1st grade premierships than any other TCA club. Their home ground is the TCA ground which is located on the Queens Domain.

NHCC have won 20 TCA Premierships, The most recent premierships was in the 2009/2010 season where the team won the 50 over 20/20 and the two-day premiership beating a strong University team that contained Tim Paine, James Faulkner, Jason Krejza, Rhett Lockyear and Graeme Cunningham beating them comfortable every time, in that year North Hobart created history to become the first team to win all three competitions in a season.

== Honours ==
TCA Premierships: (20) 1905–06,1906–07,1908–09,1911–12,1912–13,1947–48,1949–50,1954–55,1970–71,1972–73,1978–79,1991–92, 1992–93,1993–94,1995–96,1998–99,2001–2002,2004–2005, 2005–2006,2009–2010

TCA/CTPL Limited Overs Cup (1)1985-86 Kookaburra Cup (6)1989-90, 1992–93, 1996–97, 1997–98, 2001–02, 2009–10

TCA/CTPL Twenty 20 Cup (1) 2009-10 Statewide Twenty 20 Cup (1)2009 Statewide Twenty 20 Cup (1) 2018/19

Women's Grade Cricket Competition 2010-11

== State players ==
North Hobart have had 70 state players throughout their history. Some recent state players include Sean Clingeleffer, Michael Dighton, Michael DiVenuto, Adam Griffth, Nick Kruger, Dan Marsh, Todd Pinnington, John Rogers, Shaun Young, Jordan Silk, Caleb Jewell, Tom Rogers, Jake Doran and Alex Pyecroft

== Life Members ==
‌

D.C. Green † V.L.Hooper † R.J.Drew†

B.Brownlow † E. Deakes † C. Richardson † R. Richardson † B. Richardson (Betty) † G. Long L. Appleton B. Cotton † G. Taylor I. Cotton † E. Richardson † P. O’May T. Rooney D. Males C. Bowerman T. Pinnington L. Cox M. Harry P. Collins R. De Groot G. Maynard D. Manson A. Judd K. Taylor D. Mizzen D. Bearman D. Marsh (2010/11) M. DiVenuto (2010/11) A. Griffith (2011/12) D. Collins (2011/12) S. Jewell (2011/12) M. Bowerman (2011/12)

== Club Partnership Records ==
Wicket	Score	Partnership Batsmen	Opponent	Season
1	215	J Gardiner & B Brownlow	Glenorchy	1944-45
2	305	T Pinnington & B Donaldson	Clarence	1999-2000
3	214	CH Robinson & RH Wilkins	South Hobart	1913-14
4	297	C Jeffrey & M Walker	Sandy Bay	1943-44
5	251	CH Robinson & T Weavers	South Hobart	1913-14
6	262*	R de Groot & J Dakin	Clarence	2009-10
7	99	P Collins & D Mizzen	New Town	1997-98
8	205*	M Dighton & J Dakin	Kingborough	2009-10
9	70	S Hawson & C Allen	South Hobart	1909-10
10	129*	R Hawson & G Linney	South Hobart	1911-12
