= Mark Browning =

Australian rules footballer (born 1956)

Personal information
- Full name: Mark Browning
- Born: 30 November 1956 (age 69)
- Original team: Beverly Hills
- Height: 180 cm (5 ft 11 in)
- Weight: 80 kg (176 lb)

Playing career^{1}
Years	Club	Games (Goals)
1975–1987	South Melbourne/Sydney	251 (138)
- ^{1} Playing statistics correct to the end of 1987.

Career highlights
- Simpson Medal 1982 (VIC v WA in Perth); Sydney Swans best & fairest 1983; Sydney Swans captain 1984–85; Captain/Coach TFL premiers 1990 (Hobart)

Mark Browning (born 30 November 1956) is a former Australian rules footballer who played for the Sydney Swans from 1975 to 1987. He won the club's best and fairest award in 1983 and captained the Swans in 1984 and 1985. During his time with the Swans, Browning won the Simpson Medal for best on ground in the 1982 Western Australia v Victoria State of Origin match played in Perth.

In 1988 he signed on as Captain-Coach of the Hobart Football Club in the Tasmanian Football League where he experienced considerable success with the Tigers, who had been in the doldrums for some years.

Skippering them to a losing Grand Final in 1989 after his side led the eventual Premier (North Hobart) by 40-points during the second quarter of the decider.

However, the heartbreak was to be erased somewhat in 1990, when his Hobart side was to go on and defeat North Launceston by 58-points after a devastating final quarter onslaught, giving Browning his only taste of premiership success in football.

After an Elimination Final loss at the hands of the Burnie Hawks in 1991, Browning led the club as non-playing coach for the 1992 season where, after a strong start to the season, his injury ravaged Tiger outfit fought their way into another Grand Final against North Hobart, but a similar result to 1989 ensued.

After resigning as coach of Hobart, Browning briefly worked as an around-the-grounds commentator for ABC Radio Football in Tasmania before returning briefly in 1993 to coach the Southern team in the short-lived Area of Origin games.

Browning is currently a Junior Development Officer for AFL Queensland.
