= Garry Davidson =

Australian rules footballer and coach (1954–2020)

Personal information
- Full name: Garry Bryan Davidson
- Born: 10 February 1954
- Died: 26 November 2020 (aged 66)
- Original team: Devonport (NWFU)
- Height: 183 cm (6 ft 0 in)
- Weight: 84 kg (185 lb)

Playing career^{1}
| Years | Club | Games (Goals) |
| 1972–1974 | Geelong | 30 (16) |
| 1978 | Richmond | 10 (9) |
| Total | | 40 (25) |
- ^{1} Playing statistics correct to the end of 1978.

Garry Bryan Davidson (10 February 1954 – 26 November 2020) was an Australian rules footballer who played for Geelong and Richmond in the Victorian Football League (VFL) during the 1970s.

Originally from Devonport, Davidson was at Geelong for three seasons and twice kicked four goals in a game. His second VFL stint, which came four years after leaving Geelong, was with Richmond. He also played with Caulfield in the Victorian Football Association (VFA).

Davidson coached Glenorchy to a Tasmanian Football League premiership in 1983 and also North Hobart to TFL Statewide premierships in 1987 and 1989. He was named, in 2000, as an assistant coach in North Hobart's official 'Team of the Century'.

He has since served as the football manager at Geelong in the AFL and in 2006 was inducted into the Tasmanian Football Hall of Fame for his career as a coach.

Davidson's son Tom Davidson played one Australian Football League (AFL) game for Collingwood.
