= Burnie Payne =

Australian rules footballer and coach (1939–2026)

Personal information
- Full name: Burnet Thomas Payne
- Born: 8 May 1939
- Died: 25 February 2026 (aged 86)
- Original team: Hobart
- Height: 175 cm (5 ft 9 in)
- Weight: 80 kg (176 lb)
- Position: Rover

Playing career
Years	Club	Games (Goals)
1956–63, 1965–73	Hobart	238 (508)
1964	St Kilda	15 (27)

Burnet Thomas Payne (8 May 1939 – 25 February 2026) was an Australian rules footballer who played for Hobart in the Tasmanian National Football League (TANFL) and St Kilda in the Victorian Football League (VFL). He was a member of the Tasmanian Football Hall of Fame, having been inducted in 2005.

== Biography ==
Payne made his TANFL debut at the age of just 16 and was a member of Hobart's 1959, 1960 and 1963 premiership teams. St Kilda then secured his services for the 1964 VFL season and he had a solid year, starting with three goals on debut and he later managed a six-goal haul in a win over South Melbourne. He finished second in St Kilda's goal-kicking, behind Darrel Baldock.

Due to family reasons, Payne returned to Tasmania after just one season on the mainland. He won William Leitch Medals in 1965 and 1966 to become the first Hobart player to win it back to back. A premiership player again in 1966, Payne spent the 1969 and 1970 season as captain-coach.

He was a regular Tasmanian interstate representative, appearing in a total of 16 matches, including the 1966 Hobart and 1969 Adelaide Carnivals. Payne retired at the end of 1973, but continued his coaching career at Kingston.

Payne died on 25 February 2026, at the age of 86.

== Sources ==
- Burnie Payne's playing statistics from AFL Tables
- Burnie Payne at AustralianFootball.com
- Holmesby, Russell and Main, Jim (2007). The Encyclopedia of AFL Footballers. 7th ed. Melbourne: Bas Publishing.
