= Jack Sullivan (footballer, born 1919) =

Australian rules footballer

Personal information
- Full name: Jack D Sullivan
- Born: 2 April 1919
- Died: 19 June 1990 (aged 71)
- Original team: Ormond Amateur
- Height: 185 cm (6 ft 1 in)
- Weight: 88 kg (194 lb)

Playing career^{1}
Years	Club	Games (Goals)
1941–1946	Richmond	31 (9)
- ^{1} Playing statistics correct to the end of 1946.

Jack P. Sullivan (2 April 1919 – 19 June 1990) was an Australian rules footballer who played with Richmond in the Victorian Football League (VFL).

Sullivan, recruited from Ormond Amateur, started out at Richmond as a centre half-forward but was later used in the ruck and at centre half-back. It was as a centre half-back that Sullivan played in the 1942 VFL Grand Final, but he wasn't able to steer his side to a win. He didn't feature at all in the 1944 and 1945 seasons, then played the first six rounds in 1946, before transferring to Williamstown. From 1947 to 1950, Sullivan was captain-coach of Hobart and led them to a TANFL premiership in the last of those years. He won the William Leitch Medal in 1947 and represented Tasmania at the 1950 Brisbane Carnival.
