= Scott Wade =

Australian rules footballer and coach

Personal information
- Full name: Scott Wade
- Born: 10 January 1960 (age 66)
- Height: 173 cm (5 ft 8 in)
- Weight: 72 kg (159 lb)
- Position: Rover

Playing career^{1}
Years	Club	Games (Goals)
1981–83	Hawthorn	12 (4)
- ^{1} Playing statistics correct to the end of 1983.

Scott Wade (born 10 January 1960) is a former Australian rules football player and administrator, most notable for his sixteen-year tenure at AFL Tasmania. He played for Hawthorn in the Victorian Football League (VFL) during the early 1980s.

Wade, a Tasmanian recruit, spent three seasons at Hawthorn and made two appearances in their premiership year of 1983. A rover, he then returned to his home state and won two William Leitch Medals, firstly with Hobart in 1984 and then for Clarence in 1989. He finished his TFL career with 282 senior games and played in three premiership teams at Clarence as well as one with Hobart. Wade entered football administration in 1997 as general manager of Clarence

Wade was promoted to become the general manager of Football Tasmania (later AFL Tasmania) in 1999, and later became CEO. Less than a year into his tenure, he oversaw the collapse of the financially crippled Statewide League, and was involved in establishing the Victorian Football League's Tasmanian Devils Football Club in its place. He was involved in arranging a long-standing deal for Hawthorn to play AFL games in Launceston, and in improving the funding for Tasmanian football from the AFL. He was later involved in the revival of the statewide league in 2009, and in that position oversaw the statewide league's revamp in 2014. Nevertheless, Wade had a negative reputation with many fans, as many of the decisions made by AFL Tasmania during his tenure were unpopular. Two decisions during the Tasmanian Devils tenure in the VFL – the decision to enter a reserves affiliation with North Melbourne and the appointment of coach Daryn Cresswell, whose off-field problems negatively impacted the team – and many of the changes made to TSL club licences in the early 2010s – including the unsuccessful attempt to force a merger between Hobart and North Hobart, and the unsuccessful establishment of the Western Storm – were particularly unpopular with fans. Wade held the top position in AFL Tasmania for sixteen years until his resignation on 9 March 2016.

In 2006, Wade was inducted into the Tasmanian Football Hall of Fame. His son Matthew Wade is a Cricketer.
