= TCA Ground =

Tasmanian cricket and football ground

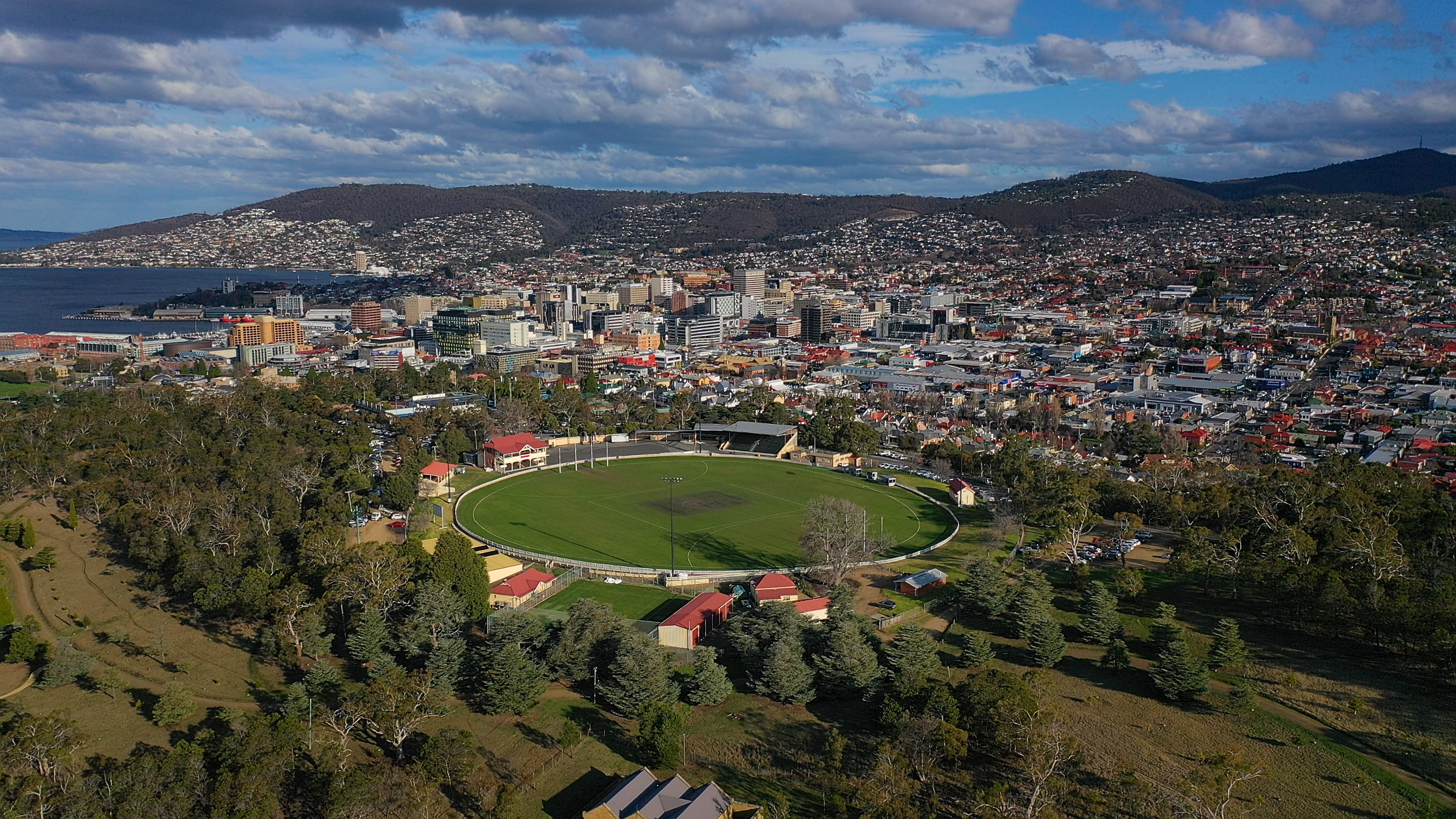
- Interactive map of TCA Ground
- Location: Queens Domain, Tasmania
- Coordinates: 42°52′19″S 147°19′41″E
- Owner: Hobart City Council
- Operator: Tasmanian Cricket Association (TCA)
- Capacity: 8,000
- Surface: Grass

Construction
- Opened: 1882

Tenants
- North Hobart Cricket Club (cricket); Hobart Football Club (SFL); DOSA Football Club (OSFA); Southern Tasmanian Junior Football League; Former: Tasmanian Tigers (Sheffield Shield)

Ground information

International information
- Only men's ODI: 10 January 1985: Sri Lanka v West Indies

The TCA Ground, formally the Tasmanian Cricket Association Ground, is a cricket and Australian rules football venue located on the Queens Domain in Hobart, Tasmania, less than 1 kilometre (0.62 mi) from the city centre. Owned by the Hobart City Council and operated by the Tasmanian Cricket Association, it is one of Hobart’s two first-class standard cricket grounds, alongside Bellerive Oval.

Cricket has been played on the site since the early 1870s, and the ground officially opened in 1882. It served as Tasmania’s principal venue for first-class and representative cricket until the late 1980s, when major matches increasingly shifted to Bellerive Oval; no first-class cricket has been played at the TCA Ground since 1987. The venue remains in regular use for local summer cricket and winter football, and is home to the North Hobart Cricket Club, Hobart Football Club and DOSA Football Club.

The ground is noted for its heritage-listed grandstands and distinctive “village” character, including a white picket boundary fence, as well as its elevated setting overlooking the River Derwent with views to Mount Wellington. In addition to sport, it has hosted major public events and concerts, most notably an AC/DC performance in 2001 which attracted the largest single-evening crowd for an event in Tasmania at the time.

== Description ==
The TCA Ground occupies an elevated site within the Queens Domain, a large public park immediately north-east of Hobart’s city centre. Its position affords expansive views across the River Derwent and central Hobart, with Mount Wellington forming a prominent backdrop to the west.

Due to its exposed location, the ground is subject to strong and often variable winds, particularly sea breezes moving up the Derwent estuary. These conditions have historically influenced play, especially during cricket matches. During a match between a touring South African team and a Combined XI in December 1963, play was temporarily suspended following an appeal by South African captain Trevor Goddard regarding the strength of the wind.

== Use ==
=== Cricket ===
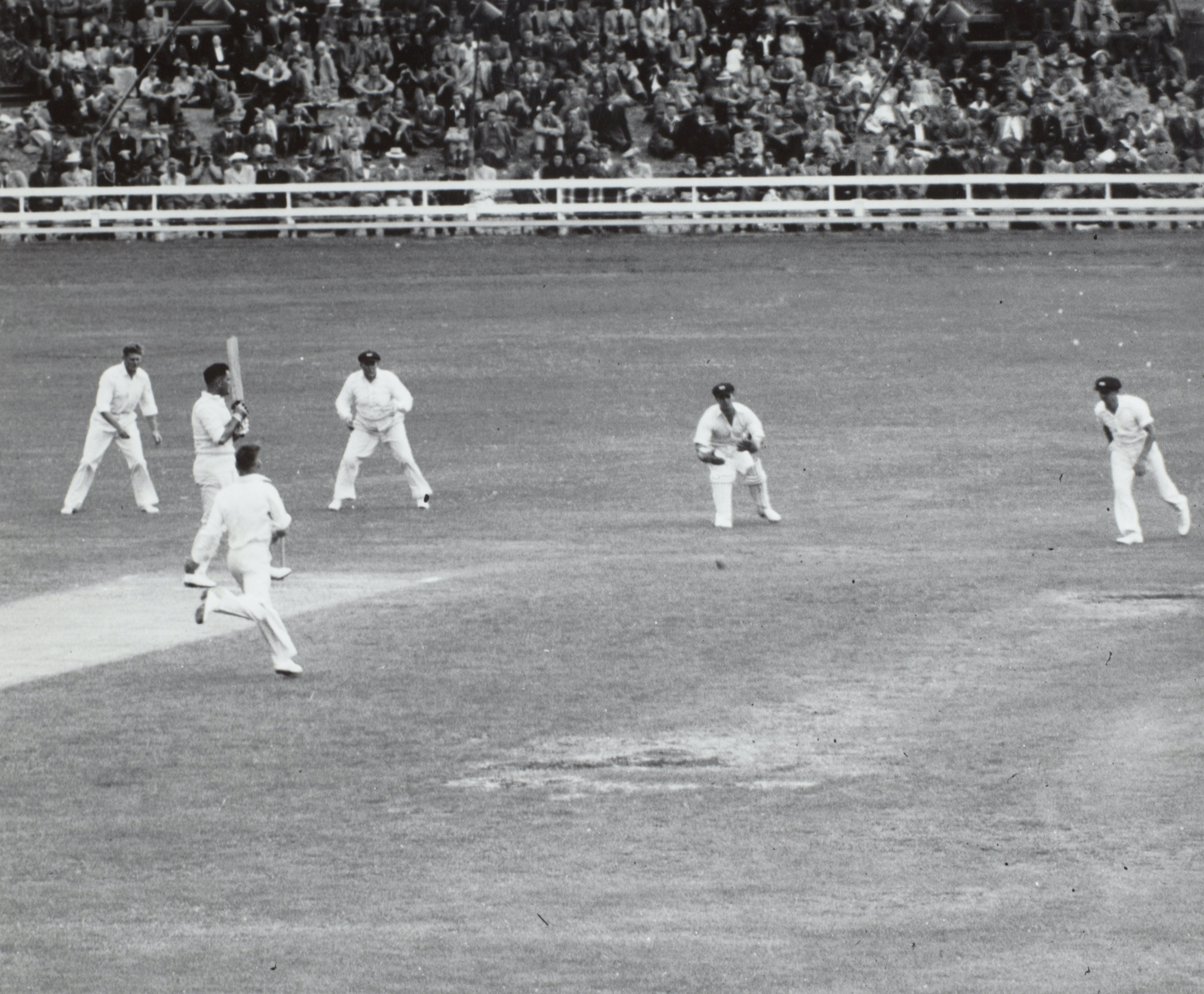
Players and spectators during a cricket match at the TCA Ground, 1951

The ground is used extensively for local grade cricket and is the home venue of the North Hobart Cricket Club. Facilities include turf and synthetic practice nets and an indoor bowling practice area.

Historically, the TCA Ground was Tasmania’s principal venue for first-class and representative cricket. Following the shift of major matches to Bellerive Oval from the mid 1980s, the ground ceased hosting first-class cricket, with the final state-level match played in 1987.

=== Australian rules football ===
The venue is home to the Hobart Football Club, which competes in the Southern Football League, and the DOSA Football Club (Old Scholars Football Association). The ground also hosts matches for the Southern Tasmanian Junior Football League.

Floodlighting installed in 2011 enabled limited night matches, although the ground continues to be used predominantly for daytime fixtures.

== History ==
=== Establishment and early development (1870s–1918) ===
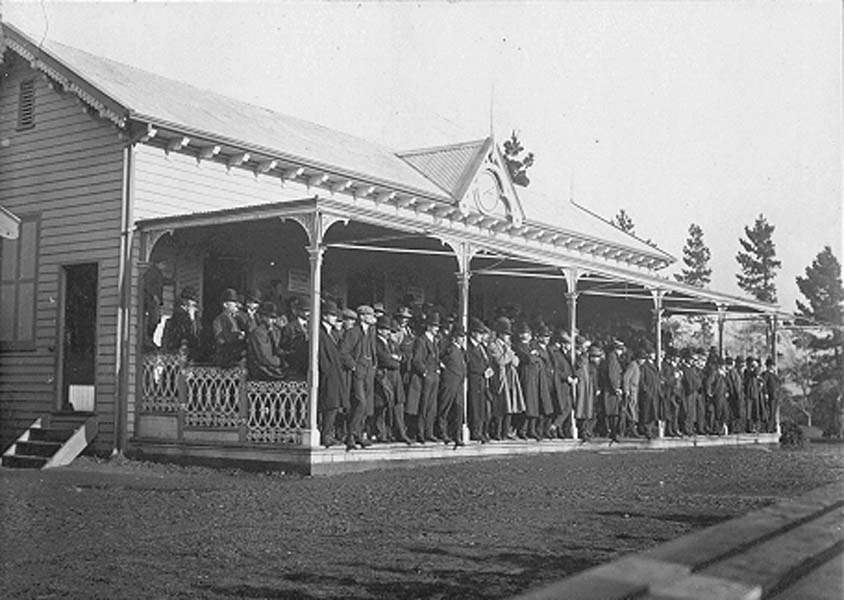
Original members’ stand at the Tasmanian Cricket Association Ground, c. 1900

On 8 September 1873, the Tasmanian Cricket Association was granted permission to use the area exclusively for cricket. The ground officially opened in 1882 with an inaugural match between the TCA and a visiting Melbourne Cricket Club (MCC) XI.

The principal grandstand, later known as the H. C. Smith Stand, was completed in 1880 and extended in 1908. The adjacent Ladies Stand was completed in 1894. Both structures remain largely intact and are heritage listed. A manually operated scoreboard was installed in 1907.

=== Peak cricket era (1960s–1987) ===
The TCA Ground hosted numerous touring international teams and domestic fixtures, culminating in Tasmania’s admission to the Sheffield Shield in 1977. In 1979, a record crowd of 10,882 attended the Gillette Cup final, where Tasmania defeated Western Australia.

The ground hosted its only One-Day International in January 1985, when the West Indies defeated Sri Lanka. The final state-level match was the 1987 McDonald’s Cup final.

=== Greyhound racing (1935–1980) ===
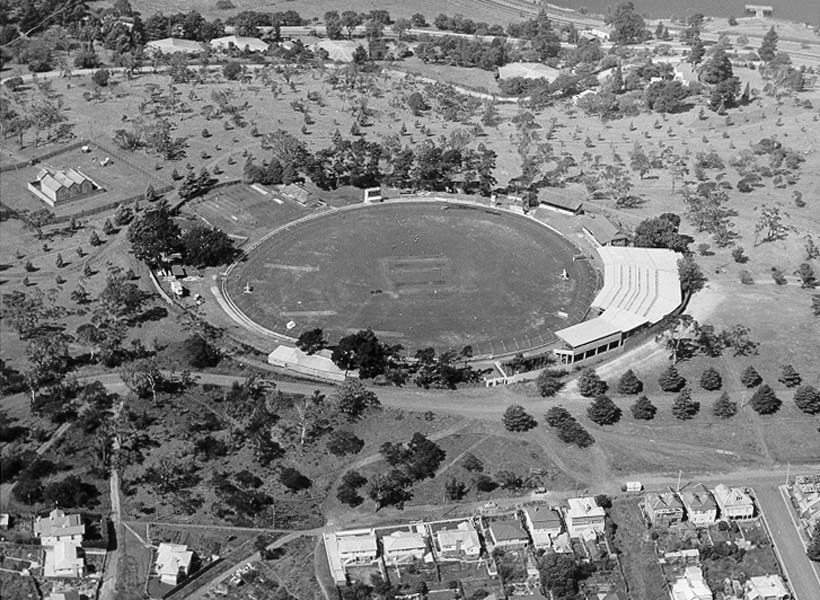
A 1960 aerial photograph showing the oval and greyhound facilities

From 1935 until 1980, the ground was used for greyhound racing by the Hobart Greyhound Racing Club. The first meeting was held on 30 January 1935, and the venue became home to the Hobart Thousand. Racing ceased in October 1980 when operations moved to the Royal Hobart Showground. Asbestos-containing roofing associated with the greyhound racing era was removed in 2010.
In 1954 the Hobart Greyhound Racing Club erected two grandstands at the ground, the major one being the Western (renamed the Powell, Pascoe, Payne) Stand, which was used predominantly by the Hobart Football Club who opened their clubrooms beneath it in 1970.
A smaller, un-named grandstand was built beside the H.C Smith Stand and was in use for 64 years until it was demolished in March 2018.

== Planning and future ==
=== Stadium site assessment (2022) ===
In 2022, the TCA Ground was assessed as part of the Tasmanian Government’s Hobart Stadium site selection process. The assessment identified constraints including heritage-listed structures, limited capacity for expansion, and restricted access associated with the steep terrain of the Queens Domain. The site was not shortlisted, with preference given to Macquarie Point.

=== Current upgrades ===
In February 2025, the Tasmanian Government announced funding of $150,000 to support upgrades to ageing facilities at the TCA Ground, with works focused on accessibility and supporting increased participation across both female and male competitions.

== Attendance ==
No.	Date	Event	Teams / Performer	Type	Attendance
1	5 March 1948	Tasmania v Australian XI	Tasmania / Australian XI	First-class cricket	11,002
2	14 January 1979	Gillette Cup Final	Tasmania v Western Australia	Domestic one-day cricket	10,822
3	10 January 1985	One-Day International	West Indies v Sri Lanka	One-Day International	6,500
4	15 March 1987	McDonald's Cup Final	Tasmania v South Australia	Domestic one-day cricket	8,680
5	27 January 2001	Concert	AC/DC	Music	15,300

== Access ==
The ground is accessible via the Tasman Highway. Public transport is provided by Metro Tasmania, with special shuttle services often operating for major events. Limited parking is available within the Queens Domain, and patrons are encouraged to use public transport.
