= Hobart Football Club =

Australian rules football club in Tasmania

Hobart

Names
- Full name: Hobart Football Club
- Nickname: Tigers
- Club song: "Hobart Forever Boys"

2026 (SFL) season
- After finals: Runner-Up
- Home-and-away season: 3rd from 8
- Leading goalkicker: Lachie Dare (34)

Club details
- Founded: 19 December 1944; 81 years ago
- Colours
- Competition: SFL Community League
- President: Josh Munting
- Coach: Allen Christensen
- Premierships: SFL (1): 1999; TFL (9): 1950; 1954; 1959; 1960; 1963; 1966; 1973; 1980; 1990; Tasmanian State Premiership (1): 1959
- Ground: TCA Ground (capacity: 6,500)

Uniforms
Home	Away

Other information
- Official website: hobartfc.com.au

Hobart Football Club (nicknamed The Tigers) is an Australian rules football club based in Hobart, Tasmania.
The club play their home fixtures at the TCA Ground on the Queens Domain, in Hobart and is a member of the Southern Football League.

== History ==
The Hobart Football Club was formed at a meeting at The Continental Ballroom in Hobart on 19 December 1944 and became a playing member of the Tasmanian Football League (TFL) in 1945 as a direct continuation of the former Cananore Football Club which participated in the TFL from 1908 to 1941.

The club was a playing member of the TFL from 1945 to 1997 when it had its license cancelled by the TFL due its perilous financial position and ongoing poor onfield performances.

Hobart's finest era was from 1947 to 1966 when they made the finals in all bar three years, earned five minor premierships and took out six TFL premiership titles in 1950, 1954, 1959, 1960, 1963 and 1966 and the 1959 State Premiership from ten grand final appearances during that era.

From 1967 to 1985 Hobart would find success rare, taking out an incredible win in the 1973 decider against the previously unbeaten Sandy Bay and the 1980 Winfield Statewide Cup and TFL premiership in the same season, between 1967 and 1985 the club finished last on eleven occasions, second last on two other occasions.

In 1986 the TFL switched to a new Statewide format and this seemed to reinvigorate the club with strong recruiting and good junior players coming through the system, the Tigers were to enter another strong period in their history under high-profile coaches Peter Hudson (1986-1987) and Mark Browning (1988-1992), the Tigers participated in six finals series in seven years and participated in three grand finals and earned its last major premiership title in 1990 over North Launceston.

After losing the 1992 TFL Grand Final to North Hobart, Hobart would never again be a dominant force in Tasmanian football, the resignation of coach Mark Browning after the season ended saw the club have four senior coaches in twelve months and eventually Hobart were to announce in 1994 that they were servicing debts of $450,000 as the Tigers very future looked to be spiralling out of control.

After five consecutive poor seasons and with continuous financial losses and poor attendances and an exodus of forty players from the club, the TFL discontinued Hobart's playing licence in 1997 to participate in the competition after that season and attempted to force the club into a three-way merger with Sandy Bay and North Hobart which ultimately failed to materialise.

Hobart's final TFL match was on 23 August 1997 at North Hobart Oval when they were defeated by North Hobart by 48 points. The Tigers' participated in 1,002 TFL games (441-552-9) as well as 15 extra matches (9-5-1) involving either Tasmanian State Grand Finals, State Preliminary Finals or matches in the 1980 Winfield Statewide Cup, giving the club a total of 1,017 all-time matches at the completion of their stint as a TFL club.

In 1998 Hobart were given approval to join the relatively new Southern Football League, a competition formed only two years earlier involving clubs from the defunct Tasmanian Amateur Football League (Southern Division) and the Huon Football Association.

As a prerequisite of entering the competition Hobart were required to cease using their Tigers emblem and black and gold playing uniform, instead opting to wear a predominantly Old Gold strip with black numbers and simple "HFC" emblem on the chest.

After an initially tough start in their first season winning only four matches, Hobart were to sign former premiership player Steven Gillbee as playing coach and with a return of many former players in 1999, this would herald a return of the club as a power.

Hobart went on to record minor premierships in 1999 and 2000, winning their first, and to date, only SFL premiership in 1999 along with eight finals series appearances from 1999 to 2008 under Steven Gillbee, Michael McGregor, Andrew Lamprill and Todd Lewis but premiership success would continuously elude them.

After a fractious decision by the club to adopt the Brisbane Lions emblem, colours and playing strip for four seasons from 2005 to 2008, Hobart were accepted to join the new Tasmanian State League from 2009 to 2013 and began playing in their traditional Tigers playing strip once again but success was to elude Hobart both on and off the field in the TSL, with continuous financial losses, lack of on-field success and an AFL Tasmania decision to force a merger between them and North Hobart as a new Hobart City club, Hobart Football Club voted to withdraw from the TSL at the end of the 2013 season, the Tigers final match in the top tier of Tasmanian football saw them suffer a 35-point loss to Glenorchy on 24 August 2013 at the TCA Ground.

As a result of the Tigers resignation from the TSL and return to the SFL the club lost almost its entire playing list to other TSL clubs. With the SFL also banning the club from recruiting other players from within the SFL during their first season it resulted in a player shortage which almost sent them into extinction.

After two difficult seasons returning to SFL level Hobart were able to rebound in 2016 and make their first finals appearance since 2008, attempting to win their first finals match since 26 August 2006, but were defeated by New Norfolk by 38 points in the Elimination Final at Boyer Oval, however that finals appearance proved to be a false dawn as the Tigers once again sank to the lower reaches of the SFL standings and suffered a winless 2019 season.

After signing former Richmond-draftee Alex Gilmour as coach at the start of 2020, the club made the finals for only the second time in twelve years in a COVID-19 Pandemic interrupted season but bowed out to Lindisfarne in the Eliminational Final, despite a promising start to 2021, the injury-plagued Tigers fell away as the season progressed and finished in sixth position.

The club has had somewhat of a nomadic existence throughout its long history having played on three home grounds at various stages. Hobart began playing at the North Hobart Oval from 1945, moving to the TCA Ground part way through the 1946 season until it moved back to North Hobart in 1955 owing to a major disagreement with the Hobart Greyhound Racing Club (the TCA Ground's more financial and dominant shareholder) over exorbitant rent costs and did not return until 1961.

From 1961 to 1982 Hobart played the vast majority of its home matches back at the TCA Ground until the TFL's ground rationalisation plans of the early 1980s saw the club forced to relocate from a by-then sub-standard facility to Glenorchy's KGV Football Park for the start of the 1983 season and they would stay there until late in the 1986 season when the club made moves to resume playing matches at North Hobart in an effort to improve flagging attendance figures (Hobart's 1985 home attendances at KGV were the club's lowest since 1945).

From the latter part of 1986 until the Tigers' final match in TFL football in 1997, the club resumed playing its home matches at North Hobart again, with the exception of four specially staged home matches back at the TCA Ground in 1995 and 1996 against North Hobart, Sandy Bay, Launceston and finally South Launceston in order to raise urgent funds for the then cash-strapped club.

When Hobart were accepted into the SFL in 1998, the club resumed playing matches at the TCA Ground on a full-time basis and remains so to present.

== Information ==
=== Affiliations ===
- TANFL (1945–1985)
- TFL Statewide League (1986–1997)
- SFL/SFL Premier League (1998–2008)
- TSL (2009–2013)
- SFL/SFL Premier/SFL Community League (2014–present)

== Honours ==
Joined SFL/Premier League/SFL Community League

- 1998–2008 and 2014–present

SFL Premierships

- 1999

SFL Runner Up

- 2003, 2026

TFL Premierships

- 1950, 1954, 1959, 1960, 1963, 1966, 1973, 1980, 1990

TFL Runner Up

- 1947, 1949, 1952, 1955, 1989, 1992

Tasmanian State Premierships

- 1959

Winfield Statewide Cup Champions

- 1980

=== Attendance records ===
Record Home Attendance – TANFL

- 8,760 v New Town on 14 June 1949 at North Hobart Oval
- 5,675 v North Hobart on 5 July 1947 at TCA Ground

Record Home Attendance – TFL Statewide League

- 3,344 v Clarence on 5 May 1990 at North Hobart Oval

Record Finals Attendance – TANFL

- 17,111 v Glenorchy on 22 September 1980 (1980 TANFL Grand Final) at North Hobart Oval

Record Finals Attendance – TFL Statewide League

- 16,528 v North Hobart on 16 September 1989 (1989 TFL Statewide League Grand Final) at North Hobart Oval

Record Finals Attendance – Southern Football League

- 4,289 v North Hobart on 20 September 2003 (2003 SFL Grand Final) at North Hobart Oval

=== Club Record Scores ===
- TFL 31.17 (203) v Sth Launceston 15.21 (111) on 25 August 1990 at York Park
- SFL 36.14 (230) v Channel 10.6 (66) on 22 April 2000 at TCA Ground
- TSL 25.13 (163) v Devonport 11.5 (71) on 7 May 2011 at TCA Ground

Club Record Quarter

- TFL 13.3 (81) v North Launceston (4th Quarter) on 19 July 1986 at York Park
- SFL 14.3 (87) v Channel (4th Quarter) on 22 April 2000 at TCA Ground
- TSL 10.1 (61) v Devonport (4th Quarter) on 7 May 2011 at TCA Ground

Most Goals in a Match (individual)

- 15.3 – Bernie Waldron – Hobart v Clarence on 30 August 1952 at TCA Ground

Club Record Games Holder

- 405* – Justin Harvey (1995–2012 & 2018–2026)
- 287 – D. K. "Kerry" Wilson (1961–1975)

=== Individual ===
==== Medal Winners ====
William Leitch Medal winners (Awarded to the Best & Fairest Player in TFL Seniors)

- 1947 – Jack Sullivan
- 1957 – Trevor Leo
- 1959 – Mal Pascoe
- 1964 – David Sullivan
- 1965 – Burnie Payne
- 1966 – Burnie Payne
- 1984 – Scott Wade

Darrel Baldock Medal winners (Awarded to the best player in the TFL Statewide Grand Final)

- 1990 – Michael Winter

George Watt Medal winners (Awarded to the Best & Fairest Player in TFL Reserves)

- 1952 – Joe Whittle
- 1972 – Garry Rogers
- 1982 – Steven Strong

Major V. A. Geard Medal winners (Awarded to the Best Fairest Player in TFL Thirds)

- 1944 – Don Foster (Macalburn)
- 1945 – Max Walker (Macalburn)
- 1946 – Alan Hughes (Macalburn)
- 1947 – Alan Hughes (Macalburn)
- 1953 – A. Unsworth (Macalburn)
- 1961 – Ian Stewart (Macalburn)
- 1972 – Garry Whittle
- 1978 – Jamie McIntyre
- 1984 – Craig Randall
- 1989 – Damian Goss
- 1991 – Justin Goc
- 1992 – Alan Bond
- 1996 – Brent Dickson

D. R. Plaister Medal winners (Awarded to the Best & Fairest Player in TFL Fourths)

- 1986 – Simon Sproule

Weller Arnold Medal Winner (Awarded to the best player in TFL Intrastate matches)

- 1953 – John Golding
- 1959 – Mal Pascoe
- 1962 – Dennis Powell
- 1969 – Burnie Payne
- 1975 – Malcolm Bugg
- 1979 – Murray Dickson & Scott Brain (Tie)
- 1985 – Tony Marchant

Lipscombe Medal Winners (Awarded to the best player in SFL Colts)

- 2017 – Lachlan Plummer
- 2019 – Brock Daniels

==== Competition Leading Goalkickers ====
TFL Leading Goalkickers

- 1953 – Bernie Waldron (47)
- 1959 – Mal Pascoe (75)
- 1960 – Mal Pascoe (57)
- 1977 – Col Smith (49)
- 1980 – Paul Courto (86)
- 1986 – Wayne Fox (105)
- 1987 – Wayne Fox (80) (three-way tie)
- 1993 – Keith Robinson (76)

SFL Leading Goalkickers

- 1999 – Dale Hall (98)

== Senior Coaches ==
=== Senior Coaching History ===
Period	Coach
1945	(Australia) Cecil Geappen
1946	(Australia) Ron Savage
1946	(Australia) Noel Gray Snr (Caretaker Coach)
1947–1950	(Australia) Jack Sullivan
1951–1953	(Australia) Bill Tonks
1954–1958	(Australia) Bill Williams
1959–1965	(Australia) Mal Pascoe
1966–1968	(Australia) John Watts
1969–1970	(Australia) Burnie Payne
1971–1972	(Australia) Denis Munari
1972–1973	(Australia) Alan Appleton
1974	(Australia) Trevor Leo
1975–1976	(Australia) David Harris
1977	(Australia) Barry Grinter
1978–1979	(Australia) Mal Pascoe
1980–1981	(Australia) Paul Sproule
1982–1983	(Australia) Bruce Greenhill
1984–1985	(Australia) Scott Wade
1986–1987	(Australia) Peter Hudson
1988–1992	(Australia) Mark Browning
1993	(Australia) Greg Lane
1993–1996	(Australia) Wayne Petterd
1996–1997	(Australia) Gary Williamson
1998	(Australia) Ray O'Rourke
1999–2002	(Australia) Stephen Gillbee
2003–2004	(Australia) Michael McGregor
2005–2006	(Australia) Ian Wilson
2006–2007	(Australia) Andrew Lamprill
2008–2009	(Australia) Todd Lewis
2009–2011	(Australia) Graeme Fox
2012–2013	(Australia) Anthony McConnon
2014–2016	(Australia) Steven Woods
2017–2019	(Australia) Mark Beck
2019	(Australia) Nathan Hartnett (Caretaker Coach)
2020–2022	(Australia) Alex Gilmour
2024	(Australia) Daniel Gray
2025–2026	(Australia) Allen Christensen

== Senior Best and Fairest Winners ==
- 1945 – Noel Atkins
- 1946 – Harold Bailey
- 1947 – Jack Sullivan
- 1948 – Bob Verrier
- 1949 – Alan Hughes
- 1950 – Alan Hughes
- 1951 – Alan Hughes
- 1952 – Paddy Williams
- 1953 – Leon Synott
- 1954 – Terry Risely
- 1955 – John Golding
- 1956 – Kevin Free
- 1957 – Trevor Leo
- 1958 – Ray Hill
- 1959 – Dennis Powell
- 1960 – Trevor Leo
- 1961 – Dennis Powell
- 1962 – Dennis Powell
- 1963 – Burnie Payne
- 1964 – David Sullivan
- 1965 – Dennis Powell
- 1966 – Dennis Powell
- 1967 – Dennis Powell
- 1968 – Noel Mewett
- 1969 – D.K "Kerry" Wilson
- 1970 – Glenn Burrill
- 1971 – Malcolm Bugg
- 1972 – Robbie Claridge
- 1973 – Malcolm Bugg
- 1974 – John Emin
- 1975 – Michael Krause
- 1976 – Ross Wright
- 1977 – Kelvyn Anderson
- 1978 – Murray Dickson
- 1979 – Warren Cripps
- 1980 – Scott Wade
- 1981 – Wayne Petterd, Chris Fagan & Kelvyn Anderson
- 1982 – Tony Marchant
- 1983 – Greg Thirgood
- 1984 – Scott Wade
- 1985 – Scott Wade
- 1986 – Craig Hoyer
- 1987 – Craig Hoyer
- 1988 – Mark Browning
- 1989 – Jamie Shanahan
- 1990 – Geoff Keogh
- 1991 – Geoff Keogh
- 1992 – Peter Baldwin
- 1993 – Brenton Tapp
- 1994 – Rob Veale
- 1995 – Steven Gillbee
- 1996 – Steven Gillbee
- 1997 – Martin Free
- 1998 – Justin Harvey
- 1999 – Stephen Willis
- 2000 – Brent Quinn & Michael Graves
- 2001 – Mark Knott
- 2002 – Craig Haremza
- 2003 – Matthew Harvey
- 2004 – Shawn Sartori
- 2005 – Jamie Di Ienno
- 2006 – Scott Dickson
- 2007 – Michael Cassidy
- 2008 – Trent Harvey
- 2009 – Blair Kean
- 2010 – Andrew Lemm
- 2011 – Todd Willing
- 2012 – Tarquin Netherway
- 2013 – Jamie Di Ienno
- 2014 – Tim Dennis
- 2015 – Luke Sullivan
- 2016 – Tim Langdale
- 2017 – Luke Sullivan
- 2018 – Jayden Charlton
- 2019 – Gerard Lynd
- 2020 – Luke Adams & Jack Adams
- 2021 – Brock Daniels
- 2022 – Brock Daniels
- 2023 – (Not Awarded)
- 2024 – Justin Harvey
- 2025 – Jude Butler

== Hobart Football Club Past Presidents ==
Period	Club President
1945–1946	(Australia) J.E Miller
1947–1951	(Australia) Wally McIndoe
1952–1954	(Australia) Clive Allen
1955–1956	(Australia) R.A Whitney
1957–1959	(Australia) Clive Allen
1960	(Australia) Dr Nigel Abbott
1961–1962	(Australia) Keith Daley
1963–1975	(Australia) Ron Pitt (deceased)
1975–1977	(Australia) Lionel Bould
1978–1981	(Australia) Michael Wade
1982	(Australia) Joe Whittle
1983	(Australia) Max Verrier
1984–1987	(Australia) Graeme Peck
1988–1990	(Australia) Geoff George
1991–1994	(Australia) Russell Young
1994–1995	(Australia) Greg Lane
1996	(Australia) John Thurley
1997–1998	(Australia) Noel Gray Jnr
1998–2002	(Australia) John Blake
2003–2011	(Australia) Philip Baker
2012–2013	(Australia) Sean Sullivan
2014–2018	(Australia) Russell Young
2019–2020	(Australia) Callum Upchurch
2021–2026	(Australia) Joshua Munting
