= List of VFL/AFL records =

This is a list of records from the Australian Football League (AFL) since its founding in 1897. From 1897 to 1989, it was known as the Victorian Football League (VFL).

== Team records ==
=== Premierships ===
Titles	Club	Seasons
16	Carlton	1906, 1907, 1908, 1914, 1915, 1938, 1945, 1947, 1968, 1970, 1972, 1979, 1981, 1982, 1987, 1995
16	Essendon	1897, 1901, 1911, 1912, 1923, 1924, 1942, 1946, 1949, 1950, 1962, 1965, 1984, 1985, 1993, 2000
16	Collingwood	1902, 1903, 1910, 1917, 1919, 1927, 1928, 1929, 1930, 1935, 1936, 1953, 1958, 1990, 2010, 2023
13	Hawthorn	1961, 1971, 1976, 1978, 1983, 1986, 1988, 1989, 1991, 2008, 2013, 2014, 2015
13	Richmond	1920, 1921, 1932, 1934, 1943, 1967, 1969, 1973, 1974, 1980, 2017, 2019, 2020
13	Melbourne	1900, 1926, 1939, 1940, 1941, 1948, 1955, 1956, 1957, 1959, 1960, 1964, 2021
10	Geelong	1925, 1931, 1937, 1951, 1952, 1963, 2007, 2009, 2011, 2022
8	Fitzroy	1898, 1899, 1904, 1905, 1913, 1916, 1922, 1944
6	Brisbane Lions	2001, 2002, 2003, 2024, 2025, 2026
5	Sydney	1909, 1918, 1933, 2005, 2012
4	North Melbourne	1975, 1977, 1996, 1999
4	West Coast	1992, 1994, 2006, 2018
2	Adelaide	1997, 1998
2	Western Bulldogs	1954, 2016
1	St Kilda	1966
1	Port Adelaide	2004

=== Runners-up ===
Titles	Club	Seasons
27	Collingwood	1901, 1905, 1911, 1915, 1918, 1920, 1922, 1925, 1926, 1937, 1938, 1939, 1952, 1955, 1956, 1960, 1964, 1966, 1970, 1977, 1979, 1980, 1981, 2002, 2003, 2011, 2018
14	Essendon	1898, 1902, 1908, 1941, 1943, 1947, 1948, 1951, 1957, 1959, 1968, 1983, 1990, 2001
14	Sydney	1899, 1907, 1912, 1914, 1934, 1935, 1936, 1945, 1996, 2006, 2014, 2016, 2022, 2024
13	Carlton	1904, 1909, 1910, 1916, 1921, 1932, 1949, 1962, 1969, 1973, 1986, 1993, 1999
12	Richmond	1919, 1924, 1927, 1928, 1929, 1931, 1933, 1940, 1942, 1944, 1972, 1982
11	Geelong	1897, 1930, 1953, 1967, 1989, 1992, 1994, 1995, 2008, 2020, 2025
6	St Kilda	1913, 1965, 1971, 1997, 2009, 2010
6	Hawthorn	1963, 1975, 1984, 1985, 1987, 2012
5	Fitzroy	1900, 1903, 1906, 1917, 1923
5	North Melbourne	1950, 1974, 1976, 1978, 1998
5	Melbourne	1946, 1954, 1958, 1988, 2000
3	West Coast	1991, 2005, 2015
2	Fremantle	2013, 2026
2	Western Bulldogs	1961, 2021
2	Brisbane Lions	2004, 2023
1	Port Adelaide	2007
1	Adelaide	2017
1	Greater Western Sydney	2019

=== Minor premierships ===
Titles	Club	Seasons
20	Collingwood	1902, 1903, 1905, 1915, 1917, 1919, 1922, 1926, 1927, 1928, 1929, 1930, 1966, 1969, 1970, 1973, 1977, 2010, 2011, 2023
17	Carlton	1906, 1907, 1908, 1910, 1914, 1916, 1921, 1932, 1938, 1941, 1947, 1972, 1976, 1979, 1981, 1987, 1995
17	Essendon	1898, 1911, 1923, 1924, 1942, 1946, 1948, 1950, 1962, 1968, 1984, 1985, 1990, 1993, 1999, 2000, 2001
15	Geelong	1897, 1901, 1925, 1931, 1937, 1951, 1952, 1953, 1954, 1980, 1992, 2007, 2008, 2019, 2022
10	Melbourne	1939, 1940, 1955, 1956, 1957, 1958, 1959, 1960, 1964, 2021
10	Sydney	1909, 1912, 1918, 1935, 1936, 1945, 1996, 2014, 2016, 2024
9	Hawthorn	1961, 1963, 1971, 1975, 1986, 1988, 1989, 2012, 2013
9	Richmond	1920, 1933, 1934, 1943, 1944, 1967, 1974, 1982, 2018
4	Fitzroy	1899, 1900, 1904, 1913
4	North Melbourne	1949, 1978, 1983, 1998
4	Port Adelaide	2002, 2003, 2004, 2020
3	West Coast	1991, 1994, 2006
3	St Kilda	1965, 1997, 2009
3	Adelaide	2005, 2017, 2025
2	Fremantle	2015, 2026

=== Wooden spoon ===
Titles	Club	Seasons
27	St Kilda	1897, 1898, 1899, 1900, 1901, 1902, 1904, 1909, 1910, 1920, 1924, 1943, 1945, 1947, 1948, 1952, 1954, 1955, 1977, 1979, 1983, 1984, 1985, 1986, 1988, 2000, 2014
12	Melbourne	1905, 1906, 1919, 1923, 1951, 1969, 1974, 1978, 1981, 1997, 2008, 2009
11	Hawthorn	1925, 1927, 1928, 1932, 1941, 1942, 1946, 1949, 1950, 1953, 1965
11	Sydney	1903, 1922, 1938, 1939, 1962, 1971, 1973, 1975, 1992, 1993, 1994
8	Richmond	1916, 1917, 1960, 1987, 1989, 2004, 2007, 2024
7	Fitzroy	1936, 1963, 1964, 1966, 1980, 1995, 1996
5	Geelong	1908, 1915, 1944, 1957, 1958
6	Essendon	1907, 1918, 1921, 1933, 2016, 2026
5	Carlton	2002, 2005, 2006, 2015, 2018
4	University	1911, 1912, 1913, 1914
4	Western Bulldogs	1959, 1967, 1982, 2003
3	West Coast	2010, 2023, 2025
2	Brisbane Bears	1990, 1991
2	Collingwood	1976, 1999
2	Greater Western Sydney	2012, 2013
2	Brisbane Lions	1998, 2017
2	Gold Coast	2011, 2019
1	Fremantle	2001
1	Adelaide	2020

=== Team wins, losses, win percentage and draws ===
All Time Ladder
#	Team	First game	GP	W	L	D	W%	Pts
1	Collingwood	8 May 1897	2649	1600	1021	28	60.93%	6456
2	Carlton	8 May 1897	2600	1472	1093	35	57.29%	5958
3	Essendon	8 May 1897	2564	1421	1107	36	56.12%	5756
4	Geelong	8 May 1897	2548	1397	1127	23	55.3%	5634
5	West Coast	29 March 1987	863	468	389	6	54.58%	1884
6	Port Adelaide	29 March 1997	619	331	283	5	54.58%	1334
7	Richmond	2 May 1908	2369	1211	1132	26	51.67%	4896
8	Adelaide	22 March 1991	755	389	364	2	51.66%	1560
9	Brisbane Lions	30 March 1997	623	308	309	6	49.92%	1242
10	Hawthorn	2 May 1925	2082	1010	1059	13	48.82%	4066
11	Sydney	8 May 1897	2541	1218	1298	25	48.43%	4922
12	Melbourne	8 May 1897	2512	1151	1339	22	46.26%	4648
13	Western Bulldogs	2 May 1925	2051	934	1095	22	46.08%	3780
14	Fitzroy	8 May 1897	1928	869	1034	25	45.07%	3526
15	Greater Western Sydney	24 March 2012	276	123	149	4	45.29%	500
16	Fremantle	1 April 1995	651	292	357	2	45.01%	1172
17	North Melbourne	2 May 1925	2070	896	1156	18	43.72%	3620
18	St Kilda	8 May 1897	2481	973	1481	27	39.76%	3946
19	Brisbane Bears	27 March 1987	222	72	148	2	32.43%	292
20	Gold Coast	2 April 2011	282	78	202	2	27.41%	316
21	University	2 May 1908	126	27	97	2	21.43%	112

=== Highest and lowest scores ===
Highest
Rank	Score	Club	Opponent	Year	Round	Venue
1	37.17 (239)	Geelong	Brisbane Bears	1992	7	Carrara Stadium
2	36.22 (238)	Fitzroy	Melbourne	1979	17	VFL Park
3	36.20 (236)	Sydney	Essendon	1987	17	Sydney Cricket Ground
4	37.11 (233)	Geelong	Melbourne	2011	19	Kardinia Park
5	36.15 (231)	Hawthorn	Fitzroy	1991	6	North Hobart Oval
Source: . Last updated: 20 August 2013.

Lowest
Rank	Score	Club	Opponent	Year	Round	Venue
1	0.1 (1)	St Kilda	Geelong	1899	3 (FS)	Corio Oval
2	0.2 (2)	St Kilda	South Melbourne	1897	3	Lake Oval
2	0.2 (2)	St Kilda	Geelong	1899	14	Corio Oval
2	0.2 (2)	Melbourne	Fitzroy	1899	2 (FS)	Brunswick Street Oval
5	0.3 (3)	St Kilda	South Melbourne	1897	10	Junction Oval
5	0.3 (3)	St Kilda	Essendon	1897	12	East Melbourne Cricket Ground
Source: . Last updated: 20 August 2013. (FS) = Sectional Round in Finals

All these scores were from the first three years of the VFL competition, when scores, in general, were much lower. The following table shows the lowest scores since 1919 (the first year of complete competition following World War I):

Lowest since 1919
Rank	Score	Club	Opponent	Year	Round	Venue
1	1.0 (6)	Fitzroy	Footscray	1953	5	Western Oval
2	0.8 (8)	Richmond	St Kilda	1961	16	Junction Oval
3	1.5 (11)	St Kilda	Melbourne	1957	16	Junction Oval
4	1.7 (13)	Hawthorn	Melbourne	1926	9	Melbourne Cricket Ground
4	1.7 (13)	Richmond	Collingwood	1927	GF	Melbourne Cricket Ground
4	1.7 (13)	Fremantle	Adelaide	2009	15	Football Park
Source: . Last updated: 20 August 2013.

=== Highest losing scores and lowest winning scores ===
Highest losing scores
Rank	Score	Club	Opponent	Opponent’s score	Year	Round	Venue
1	25.13 (163)	Geelong	Hawthorn	26.15 (171)	1989	6	Princes Park
2	25.9 (159)	Kangaroos	Essendon	27.9 (171)	2001	16	Melbourne Cricket Ground
3	23.19 (157)	Fitzroy	Melbourne	24.23 (167)	1978	2	Melbourne Cricket Ground
4	24.11 (155)	South Melbourne	Geelong	26.11 (167)	1978	19	Lake Oval
5	24.10 (154)	South Melbourne	Melbourne	24.23 (167)	1979	6	Melbourne Cricket Ground
Source: . Last updated: 20 August 2013.

Lowest winning scores
Rank	Score	Club	Opponent	Opponent’s score	Year	Round	Venue
1	1.8 (14)	Essendon	Melbourne	0.8 (8)	1897	3 (Finals)	East Melbourne Cricket Ground
2	1.9 (15)	Geelong	Melbourne	0.10 (10)	1897	9	Corio Oval
2	2.3 (15)	South Melbourne	Melbourne	1.7 (13)	1898	6	Melbourne Cricket Ground
2	1.9 (15)	Essendon	South Melbourne	0.9 (9)	1899	3	East Melbourne Cricket Ground
5	1.13 (19)	Essendon	South Melbourne	2.3 (15)	1897	6	Lake Oval
Source: . Last updated: 20 August 2013.

As with the lowest overall scores, all these were from the first three years of the VFL. The lowest winning scores in more recent times are:

Lowest winning scores since 1919
Rank	Score	Club	Opponent	Opponent’s score	Year	Round	Venue
1	2.13 (25)	Collingwood	Richmond	1.7 (13)	1927	GF	Melbourne Cricket Ground
2	3.10 (28)	Essendon	Footscray	3.5 (23)	1989	13	Windy Hill
3	4.6 (30)	Carlton	Richmond	3.5 (23)	1927	17	Princes Park
4	3.13 (31)	Collingwood	Essendon	4.6 (30)	1927	17	Victoria Park
4	4.7 (31)	Collingwood	Geelong	3.11 (29)	1951	14	Kardinia Park
4	3.13 (31)	Carlton	Geelong	2.12 (24)	1977	12	Princes Park
Source: . Last updated: 20 August 2013.

=== Highest scores by quarter ===
Quarter	Score	Club	Opponent	Year	Round	Venue
1st quarter	15.4 (94)	Essendon	Gold Coast	2011	6	Docklands Stadium
2nd quarter	14.2 (86)	Adelaide	Fitzroy	1996	17	Football Park
3rd quarter	14.2 (86)	Greater Western Sydney	Brisbane Lions	2026	11	Sydney Showground Stadium
4th quarter	17.4 (106)	South Melbourne	St Kilda	1919	12	Lake Oval
Source: . Last updated: 20 August 2013.

=== Greatest winning margins ===
Rank	Margin	Club	Opponent	Year	Round	Venue
1	190	Fitzroy	Melbourne	1979	17	VFL Park
2	186	Geelong	Melbourne	2011	19	Kardinia Park
3	178	Collingwood	St Kilda	1979	4	Victoria Park
4	171	South Melbourne	St Kilda	1919	12	Lake Oval
4	171	Sydney	West Coast	2023	15	Sydney Cricket Ground
Source: . Last updated: 24 June 2023.

=== Biggest come-from-behind victories ===
Deficit from end of quarter time:

Rank	Deficit	Club	Final score	Opponent	Final score	Year	Round	Venue
1	58	Essendon	27.9 (171)	Kangaroos	25.9 (159)	2001	16	Melbourne Cricket Ground
2	55	St Kilda	15.22 (112)	Hawthorn	14.15 (99)	1937	2	Glenferrie Oval
3	54	Collingwood	18.11 (119)	North Melbourne	19.4 (118)	2024	14	Marvel Stadium
4	51	Hawthorn	17.7 (109)	St Kilda	14.12 (96)	1999	12	Waverley Park
5	48	Richmond	19.13 (127)	Sydney	16.14 (110)	1982	21	Sydney Cricket Ground
5	Source: http://afl.allthestats.com/?itm=211134&fmqtr=0. Last updated: 14 January 2011.							

Deficit from end of half time:

Rank	Deficit	Club	Final score	Opponent	Final score	Year	Round	Venue
1	52	Collingwood	14.23 (107)	St Kilda	15.10 (100)	1970	10	Victoria Park
2	50	Melbourne	17.17 (119)	Fremantle	15.23 (113)	2008	7	Melbourne Cricket Ground
3	49	Geelong	17.10 (112)	Collingwood	17.9 (111)	1972	20	Kardinia Park
3	49	Hawthorn	26.15 (171)	Geelong	25.13 (163)	1989	6	Princes Park
3	49	St Kilda	14.10 (94)	Western Bulldogs	13.9 (87)	2015	6	Docklands Stadium
Source: http://afl.allthestats.com/?itm=211134&fmqtr=1. Last updated: 14 January 2011.

Deficit from end of three quarter time:

Rank	Deficit	Club	Final score	Opponent	Final score	Year	Round	Venue
1	46	St Kilda	15.6 (96)	Melbourne	13.12 (90)	2025	20	Marvel Stadium
2	45	Brisbane Bears	14.20 (104)	Hawthorn	15.7 (97)	1995	16	The Gabba
3	44	North Melbourne	15.12 (102)	Essendon	14.10 (94)	1947	6	Arden Street Oval
4	41	North Melbourne	12.19 (91)	Footscray	13.7 (85)	1936	7	Arden Street Oval
4	41	Essendon	18.16 (124)	Melbourne	19.9 (123)	1992	6	Melbourne Cricket Ground

Largest comebacks (from any stage of the game):

Rank	Deficit	Club	Final score	Opponent	Final score	Year	Round	Venue
1	69pts Q2 10mins	Essendon	27.9 (171)	Kangaroos	25.9 (159)	2001	16	Melbourne Cricket Ground
2	63pts Q2 5mins	Hawthorn	17.7 (109)	St Kilda	14.12 (96)	1999	12	Waverley Park
3	60pts Q2 27mins	Collingwood	14.23 (107)	St Kilda	15.10 (100)	1970	10	Victoria Park
4	56pts Q2 28mins	Hawthorn	26.15 (171)	Geelong	25.13 (163)	1989	6	Princes Park
5	55pts at Q1 time	St Kilda	15.22 (112)	Hawthorn	14.15 (99)	1937	2	Glenferrie Oval
5	55pts Q2 10mins	Collingwood	19.9 (123)	Richmond	16.13 (109)	1978	20	Melbourne Cricket Ground
5	55pts Q3 3mins	St Kilda	14.10 (94)	Western Bulldogs	13.9 (87)	2015	6	Docklands Stadium

=== Highest scores (both teams) ===
Rank	Score	Home team	Score	Away team	Score	Year	Round	Venue
1	345	Melbourne	21.15 (141)	St Kilda	31.18 (204)	1978	6	Melbourne Cricket Ground
2	337	Geelong	35.18 (228)	St Kilda	16.13 (109)	1989	7	Kardinia Park
2	337	Hawthorn	21.23 (149)	Richmond	29.14 (188)	1985	5	Princes Park
4	334	North Melbourne	35.19 (229)	Sydney	16.9 (105)	1993	6	Princes Park
4	334	Hawthorn	26.15 (171)	Geelong	25.13 (163)	1989	6	Princes Park

=== Lowest scores (both teams) ===
Rank	Score	Home team	Score	Away team	Score	Year	Round	Venue
1	22	Essendon	1.8 (14)	Melbourne	0.8 (8)	1897	FR3	Lake Oval
2	24	Essendon	1.9 (15)	South Melbourne	0.9 (9)	1899	3	East Melbourne Cricket Ground
3	25	Geelong	1.9 (15)	Melbourne	0.10 (10)	1897	9	Corio Oval
4	28	Melbourne	1.7 (13)	South Melbourne	2.3 (15)	1898	6	Melbourne Cricket Ground
5	29	Carlton	3.6 (24)	South Melbourne	0.5 (5)	1899	8	Princes Park

==== Lowest scores (both teams) since 1919 ====
As with the lowest scores and lowest winning scores, all the lowest aggregate scores above were from the first three years of VFL competition. The lowest match aggregate scores in more recent times are:

Rank	Score	Home team	Score	Away team	Score	Year	Round	Venue
1	38	Collingwood	2.13 (25)	Richmond	1.7 (13)	1927	GF	Melbourne Cricket Ground
2	51	Essendon	3.10 (28)	Footscray	3.5 (23)	1989	13	Windy Hill
3	53	St Kilda	5.5 (35)	Essendon	1.12 (18)	1923	10	Junction Oval
3	53	Carlton	4.6 (30)	Richmond	3.5 (23)	1927	6	Princes Park
5	55	Carlton	3.13 (31)	Geelong	2.12 (24)	1977	12	Princes Park

=== Most consecutive wins ===
Rank	Games	Team	Commenced	Concluded
1	23	Geelong	Round 12, 1952	Round 13, 1953
2	20	Brisbane Lions	Round 10, 2001	Round 4, 2002
2	20	Essendon	Round 1, 2000	Round 20, 2000
2	20	Collingwood	Semifinal, 1928	Round 18, 1929
5	19	St Kilda	Round 1, 2009	Round 20, 2009
5	19	Melbourne	Round 15, 1955	Round 13, 1956

=== Most consecutive losses ===
Rank	Games	Team	Commenced	Concluded
1	48	St Kilda	Round 1, 1897	Round 1, 1900
2	35	North Melbourne	Round 17, 1933	Round 14, 1935
3	33	North Melbourne	Round 6, 1930	Round 2, 1932
4	29	South Melbourne	Round 7, 1972	Round 13, 1973

== Individual records ==
=== Disposals ===
==== Most career disposals ====
Rank	Player	Disposals	Games	Clubs	Career Span
1	Scott Pendlebury	11008	434	Collingwood	2006–present
2	Robert Harvey	9656	383	St Kilda	1988–2008
3	Brent Harvey	9213	432	North Melbourne	1996–2016
4	Kevin Bartlett	9151	402	Richmond	1965–1983
5	Gary Ablett Jr.	8896	357	Geelong/Gold Coast	2002–2020
6	Craig Bradley	8776	375	Carlton	1986–2002
7	Joel Selwood	8746	355	Geelong	2007–2022
8	Sam Mitchell	8687	329	Hawthorn/West Coast	2002–2017
9	Travis Boak	8676	372	Port Adelaide	2007–2025
10	Michael Tuck	8423	425	Hawthorn	1972–1991
Source: . Last updated: 20 March 2025.

==== Most disposals in a game (since 1965) ====
Rank	Player	Disposals	Year vs Team
1	Tom Mitchell	54	2018 vs Collingwood
1	Harry Sheezel	54	2025 vs Richmond
2	Gary Ablett Jr	53	2012 vs Collingwood
2	Greg Williams	53	1989 vs St Kilda
3	Barry Price	52	1971 vs Fitzroy
4	Scott Thompson	51	2011 vs Gold Coast
4	Lachie Neale	51	2019 vs Richmond
5	John Greening	50	1971 vs Geelong
5	Tom Mitchell	50	2017 vs Collingwood
5	Tom Mitchell	50	2018 vs Greater Western Sydney
5	Tony Shaw	50	1991 vs Brisbane Bears
Source: . Last updated: 31 January 2023.

Note: Only includes performances of 50+ disposals.

==== Most disposals in a season ====
Rank	Player	Disposals	Year	Team
1	Jack Macrae	880	2021	Western Bulldogs
2	Tom Mitchell	848	2018	Hawthorn
3	Matt Crouch	825	2017	Adelaide
4	Dane Swan	820	2010	Collingwood
5	Dan Hannebery	802	2016	Sydney
6	Clayton Oliver	789	2021	Melbourne
6	Adam Treloar	789	2019	Collingwood
8	Tom Mitchell	787	2017	Hawthorn
8	Josh Kennedy	787	2016	Sydney
10	Ollie Wines	777	2021	Port Adelaide
Source: .

=== Goalkicking ===
==== Most career goals ====
Rank	Goals	Games	Player	Club/Clubs	Career
1	1360	281	Tony Lockett	St Kilda, Sydney	1983-2002
2	1299	306	Gordon Coventry	Collingwood	1920–1937
3	1254	269	Jason Dunstall	Hawthorn	1985–1998
4	1066	354	Lance Franklin	Hawthorn, Sydney	2005–2023
5	1057	267	Doug Wade	Geelong, North Melbourne	1959–1975
Source: . Last updated: 4 June 2023.

==== Most goals in a game ====
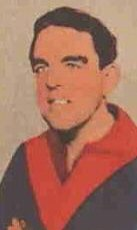
Fred Fanning

Rank	Score	Player	Club	Opponent	Year	Round	Venue
1	18.1	Fred Fanning	Melbourne	St Kilda	1947	19	Junction Oval
2	17.4	Gordon Coventry	Collingwood	Fitzroy	1930	12	Victoria Park
2	17.5	Jason Dunstall	Hawthorn	Richmond	1992	7	Waverley Park
4	16.5	Gordon Coventry	Collingwood	Hawthorn	1929	13	Victoria Park
4	16.1	Peter Hudson	Hawthorn	Melbourne	1969	5	Glenferrie Oval
4	16.4	Peter McKenna	Collingwood	South Melbourne	1969	19	Victoria Park
4	16.0	Tony Lockett	Sydney Swans	Fitzroy	1995	19	Whitten Oval
Source: . Last updated: 8 December 2022.

==== Most goals in a season ====
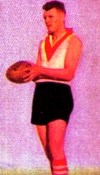
Bob Pratt

Rank	Goals	Player	Club	Season
1	150	Bob Pratt	South Melbourne	1934
1	150	Peter Hudson	Hawthorn	1971
3	146	Peter Hudson	Hawthorn	1970
4	145	Jason Dunstall	Hawthorn	1992
5	143	Peter McKenna	Collingwood	1970
Source: . Last updated: 9 July 2007.

==== Most seasons as league leading goalkicker ====
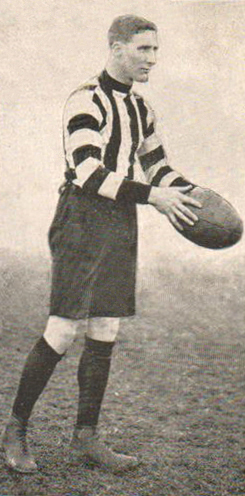
Dick Lee

Rank	Seasons	Player	Club/Clubs
1	7	Dick Lee	Collingwood
2	6	Gordon Coventry	Collingwood
3	5	John Coleman	Essendon
4	4	Fred Fanning	Melbourne
4	4	Doug Wade	Geelong, North Melbourne
4	4	Peter Hudson	Hawthorn
4	4	Tony Lockett	St Kilda, Sydney
4	4	Lance Franklin	Hawthorn, Sydney
Source: . Last updated: 20 May 2009. Note: This table does not take into account goals scored in finals.

==== Highest goals-per-game average ====
Rank	Average	Player	Club/Clubs
1	5.64	Peter Hudson	Hawthorn
2	5.48	John Coleman	Essendon
3	4.84	Tony Lockett	St Kilda, Sydney
4	4.66	Jason Dunstall	Hawthorn
5	4.58	Peter McKenna	Collingwood, Carlton
Source: . Last updated: 9 July 2007.

==== Most goals on debut ====
Rank	Goals	Player	Club	Opponent	Year	Round	Venue
1	12	John Coleman	Essendon	Hawthorn	1949	1	Windy Hill
2	9	Bill Wood	Footscray	Collingwood	1944	3	Whitten Oval
2	9	Warren Ralph	Carlton	North Melbourne	1984	1	Waverley Park
4	8	John Georgiades	Footscray	Carlton	1989	1	Princes Park
4	8	Scott Cummings	Essendon	Sydney Swans	1994	14	Melbourne Cricket Ground
Source: Official statistical history of the AFL (book). Last updated: 2007.

==== Most consecutive games with one or more goals ====
Rank	Streak	Player	Club/s	Start	End
1	121	Peter McKenna	Collingwood	1968	1974
2	114	Tony Lockett	St Kilda, Sydney	1993	2002
3	98	Gordon Coventry	Collingwood	1932	1937
4	97	Dick Lee	Collingwood	1910	1918
5	90	Doug Wade	Geelong, North Melbourne	1971	1975
Source: AFL Tables. Last updated: 13 July 2015.

==== Most career games for no goals ====
Rank	Games	Player	Club/Clubs	Start	End
1	182	Ted Potter	Collingwood	1963	1972
2	172	Gary Malarkey	Geelong	1977	1986
3	166	Les Gardiner	Essendon	1943	1953
4	162	Jamie Shanahan	St Kilda, Melbourne	1992	1999
5	154	Ian Synman	St Kilda	1958	1969
Source: AFL Tables. Last updated: 9 July 2007.

=== Games ===
==== Most career games ====
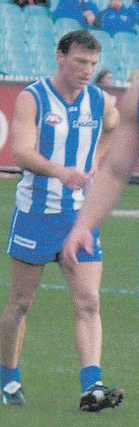
Brent Harvey

Rank	Games	Player	Club	Career span
1	441	Scott Pendlebury	Collingwood	2006–
2	432	Brent Harvey	North Melbourne	1996–2016
3	426	Michael Tuck	Hawthorn	1972–1991
4	407	Shaun Burgoyne	Port Adelaide, Hawthorn	2002–2021
5	403	Kevin Bartlett	Richmond	1965–1983

==== Most consecutive games ====
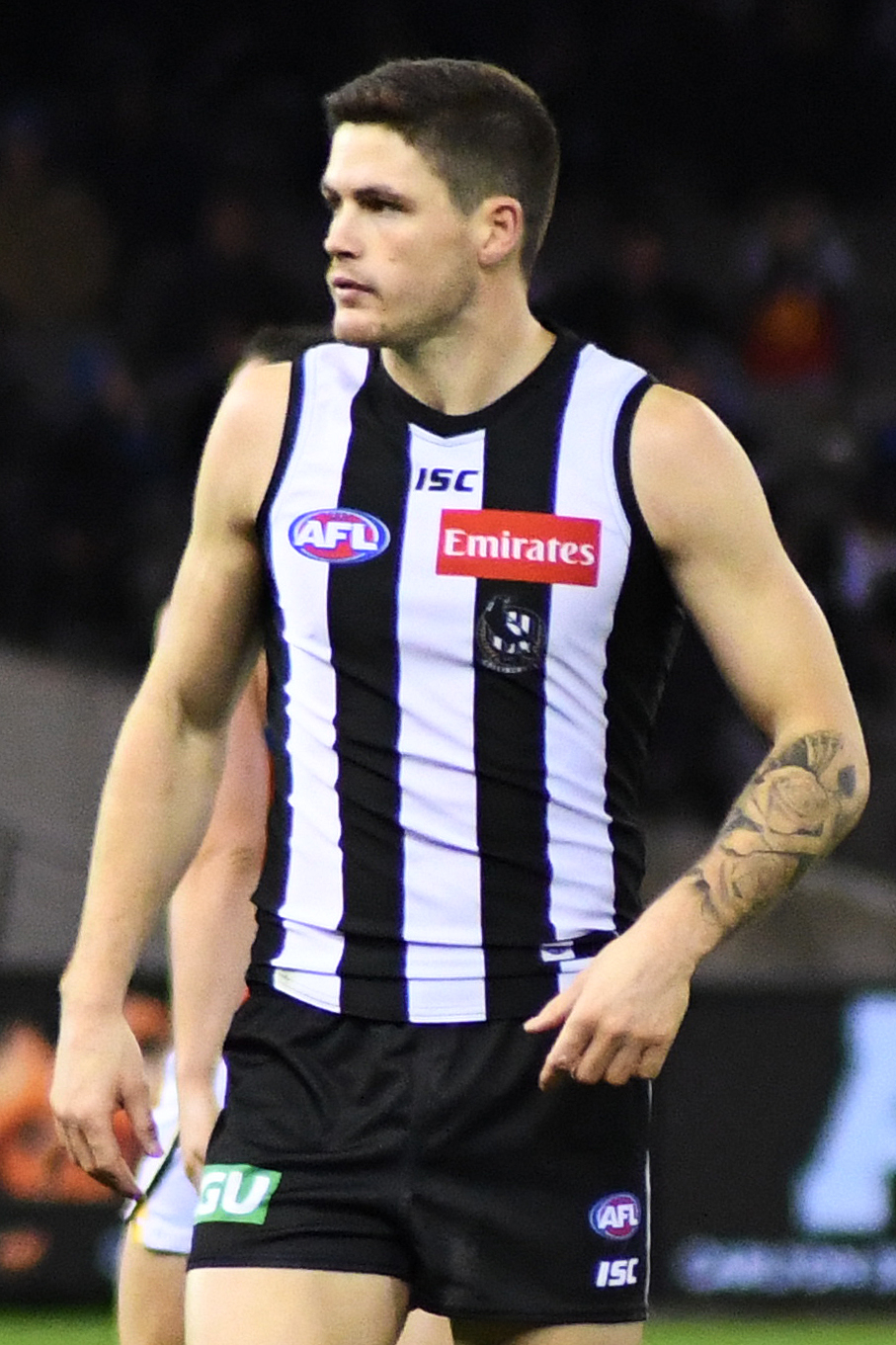
Jack Crisp has the most consecutive games of any active AFL player

Rank	Games	Player	Club
1	246*	Jack Crisp	Collingwood
2	244	Jim Stynes	Melbourne
3	226	Adem Yze	Melbourne
4	204	Adam Goodes	Sydney
5	202	Jack Titus	Richmond
Source: AFL Tables. Last updated: 24 February 2025

==== Most games for each club ====
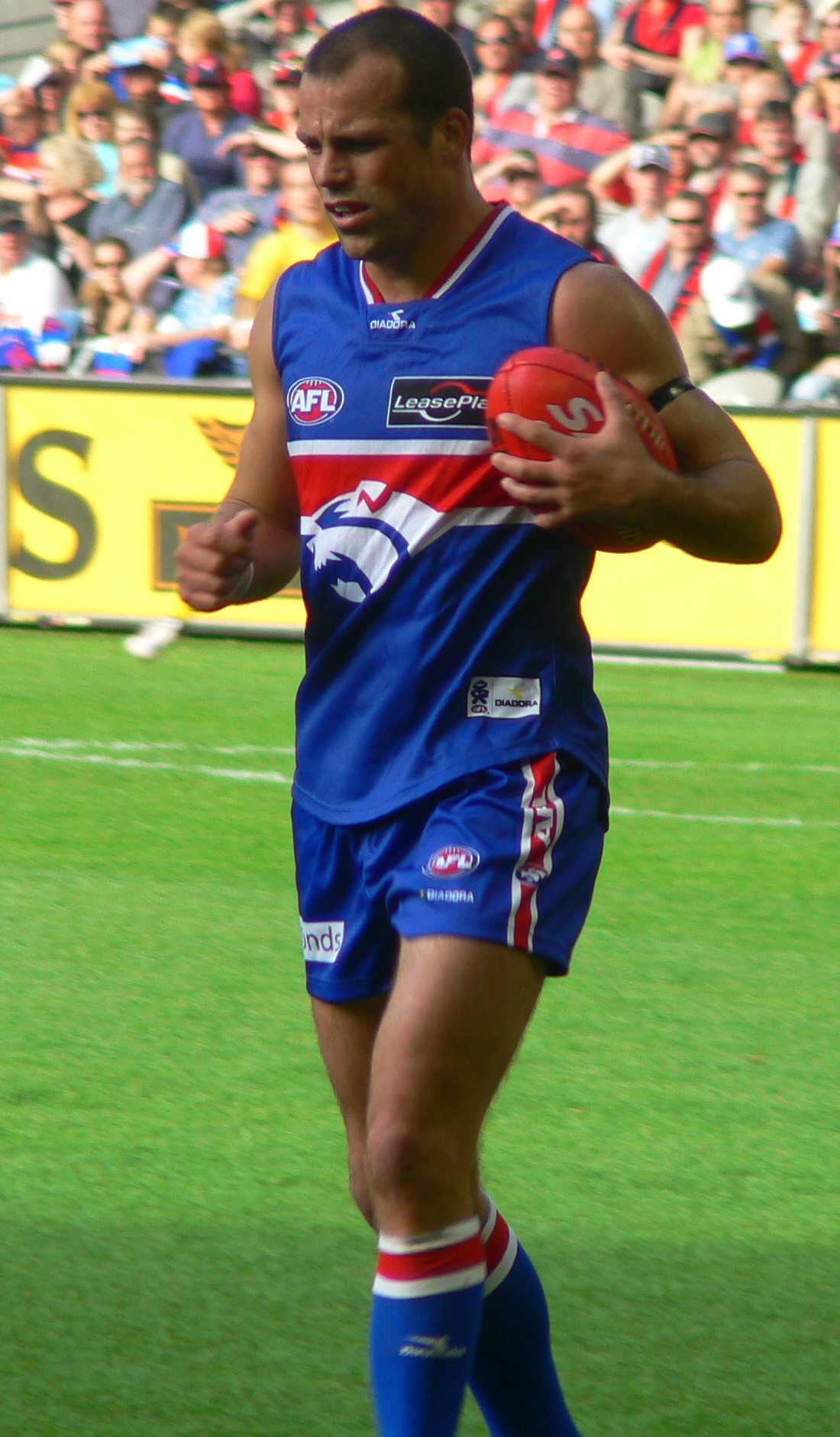
Brad Johnson

Club	Games	Player	Career span
Adelaide	340	Andrew McLeod	1995–2010
Brisbane Bears	164	Roger Merrett	1988–1996
Brisbane Lions	322	Simon Black	1998–2013
Carlton	375	Craig Bradley	1986–2002
Collingwood	434	Scott Pendlebury	2006–present
Essendon	400	Dustin Fletcher	1993–2015
Fitzroy	333	Kevin Murray	1955–1964, 1967–1974
Footscray/Western Bulldogs	364	Brad Johnson	1994–2010
Fremantle	376	David Mundy	2005–2022
Geelong	359	Tom Hawkins	2007–2024
Gold Coast	249	David Swallow	2011–2025
Greater Western Sydney	272	Toby Greene	2012–present
Hawthorn	426	Michael Tuck	1972–1991
Melbourne	306	David Neitz	1993–2008
North Melbourne	432	Brent Harvey	1996–2016
Port Adelaide	387	Travis Boak	2007–2025
Richmond	403	Kevin Bartlett	1965–1983
St Kilda	383	Robert Harvey	1988–2008
South Melbourne/Sydney	372	Adam Goodes	1999–2015
University	101	Bert Hurrey	1908–1913
West Coast	333	Shannon Hurn	2006–2023
Source: . Last updated: 20 March 2025.

=== Age records ===
==== Youngest players ====
Age on their debut:

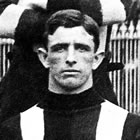
Wels Eicke

Rank	Age	Player	Club	Year
1	15 years, 209 days	Claude Clough	St Kilda	1900
2	15 years, 287 days	Keith Bromage	Collingwood	1953
3	15 years, 297 days	Albert Collier	Collingwood	1925
4	15 years, 305 days	Tim Watson	Essendon	1977
5	15 years, 315 days	Wels Eicke	St Kilda	1909
Sources: Official statistical history of the AFL (book), Australian Football.com. Last updated: 2013.

==== Oldest players ====
Age in their last game:

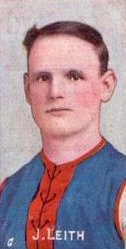
Jack Leith

Rank	Age	Player	Club	Year
1	43 years, 50 days	Vic Cumberland	St Kilda	1920
2	40 years, 23 days	Dustin Fletcher	Essendon	2015
3	39 years, 296 days	Jack Leith	Melbourne	1912
4	39 years, 239 days	Syd Barker, Sr.	North Melbourne	1927
5	39 years, 181 days	Jim Flynn	Carlton	1910
Source: . Last updated: 29 July 2020.

=== Finals ===
==== Most premierships ====
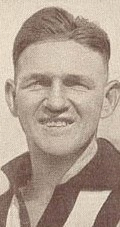
Harry Collier

Rank	Total	Player	Club
1	7	Michael Tuck	Hawthorn
2	6	Frank Adams	Melbourne
2	6	Ron Barassi	Melbourne
2	6	Albert Collier	Collingwood
2	6	Harry Collier	Collingwood
Source: Official statistical history of the AFL (book). Last updated: 31 January 2023.

==== Most grand final appearances ====
Rank	Games	Player	Club
1	11	Michael Tuck	Hawthorn
2	10	Gordon Coventry	Collingwood
2	10	Albert Collier	Collingwood
2	10	Dick Reynolds	Essendon
2	10	Bill Hutchison	Essendon
Source: AFL Tables. Last updated: 31 January 2023.

==== Most finals games ====
Rank	Games	Player	Club/Clubs
1	40	Joel Selwood	Geelong
2	39	Michael Tuck	Hawthorn
3	35	Shaun Burgoyne	Port Adelaide (14); Hawthorn (21)
4	31	Gordon Coventry	Collingwood
4	31	Scott Pendlebury	Collingwood
4	31	Harry Taylor	Geelong
Source: AFL Tables. Last updated: Finals Week 4, September 2023.

==== Most finals goals ====
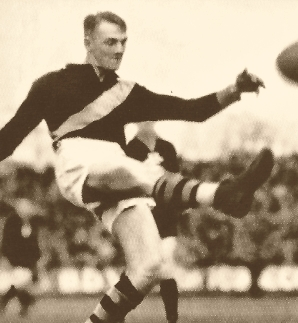
Jack Titus

Rank	Total	Player	Club/Clubs
1	112	Gordon Coventry	Collingwood
2	78	Jason Dunstall	Hawthorn
3	74	Jack Titus	Richmond
3	74	Lance Franklin	Hawthorn (46); Sydney (28)
5	72	Leigh Matthews	Hawthorn
Last updated: 5 March 2023

=== Coaching ===
==== Most games coached ====
Rank	Total	Player	Club/Clubs
1	718	Mick Malthouse	Footscray, West Coast, Collingwood, Carlton
2	714	Jock McHale	Collingwood
3	678	Kevin Sheedy	Essendon, Greater Western Sydney
4	575	Allan Jeans	St Kilda, Hawthorn, Richmond
5	522	Tom Hafey	Richmond, Collingwood, Geelong, Sydney
Source: . Last updated: 31 May 2015.

==== Most wins as coach ====
Rank	Total	Player	Club/Clubs
1	467	Jock McHale	Collingwood
2	406	Mick Malthouse	Footscray, West Coast, Collingwood, Carlton
3	389	Kevin Sheedy	Essendon, Greater Western Sydney
4	357	Allan Jeans	St Kilda, Hawthorn, Richmond
5	336	Tom Hafey	Richmond, Collingwood, Geelong, Sydney
Source: . Last updated: 31 May 2015.

==== Most premierships as coach ====
Rank	Total	Coach	Year
1	8	Jock McHale	1917, 1919, 1927, 1928, 1929, 1930, 1935, 1936
2	6	Norm Smith	1955, 1956, 1957, 1959, 1960, 1964
3	5	Jack Worrall	1906, 1907, 1908, 1911, 1912
3	5	Frank 'Checker' Hughes	1932, 1939, 1940, 1941, 1948
4	4	Dick Reynolds	1942, 1946, 1949, 1950
4	4	Tom Hafey	1967, 1969, 1973, 1974
4	4	Ron Barassi	1968, 1970, 1975, 1977
4	4	Allan Jeans	1966, 1983, 1986, 1989
4	4	David Parkin	1978, 1981, 1982, 1995
4	4	Kevin Sheedy	1984, 1985, 1993, 2000
4	4	Leigh Matthews	1990, 2001, 2002, 2003
4	4	Alastair Clarkson	2008, 2013, 2014, 2015
Source: . Last updated: 6 May 2019.

=== Player/Coach ===
==== Most games played and coached ====
Rank	Total	Coach/Player	Teams Coached	Games Coached	Teams Played For	Games Played
1	929	Kevin Sheedy	Essendon, Greater Western Sydney	678	Richmond	251
2	892	Mick Malthouse	Footscray, West Coast, Collingwood, Carlton	718	St Kilda, Richmond	174
3	878	Jock McHale	Collingwood	714	Collingwood	261 (97 games as playing coach)
4	793	Leigh Matthews	Collingwood, Brisbane	461	Hawthorn	332
5	729	David Parkin	Hawthorn, Carlton, Fitzroy	518	Hawthorn	211
Source: AFL Tables – Coaches. Last updated: 31 May 2015.

=== Awards ===
==== Most Brownlow Medals ====
Rank	Awards	Player	Club/Clubs	Years
1	3	Haydn Bunton, Sr.	Fitzroy	1931, 1932, 1935
1	3	Dick Reynolds	Essendon	1934, 1937, 1938
1	3	Bob Skilton	South Melbourne	1959, 1963, 1968
1	3	Ian Stewart	St Kilda, Richmond	1965, 1966, 1971

==== Most club best and fairests ====
Rank	Awards	Player	Club/Clubs	Years
1	9	Kevin Murray	Fitzroy	1956, 1958, 1960, 1961, 1962, 1963, 1964, 1968, 1969
1	9	Bob Skilton	South Melbourne	1958, 1959, 1961, 1962, 1963, 1964, 1965, 1967, 1968
3	8	Leigh Matthews	Hawthorn	1971, 1972, 1974, 1976, 1977, 1978, 1980, 1982
4	7	Dick Reynolds	Essendon	1934, 1936, 1937, 1938, 1939, 1942, 1943
4	7	Bill Hutchison	Essendon	1947, 1948, 1950, 1952, 1953, 1955, 1956
4	7	Gary Dempsey	Footscray, North Melbourne	1970, 1973, 1974, 1975, 1976, 1977, 1979
4	7	Scott West	Western Bulldogs	1995, 1997, 1998, 2000, 2003, 2004, 2005
4	7	Marcus Bontempelli	Western Bulldogs	2016, 2017, 2019, 2021, 2023, 2024, 2026

== See also ==
- List of AFL Women's records
- List of SANFL records
- List of Tasmanian Football League records
- List of WAFL records
- List of VFA/VFL records
- List of VFL/AFL reserves records
