= List of Tasmanian Football League records =

This is a list of Tasmanian Football League records.

For a detailed list of records pertaining to Statewide (post-1985) football, see Statewide Football in Tasmania.

== Record games holder: TANFL ==
- 352 – Steane Kremerskothen (Launceston / Clarence / North Launceston) from 1982–1999
- 274 – Kevin Baker (Glenorchy) from 1957–1974

Note: After the TANFL went to a statewide competition in 1986–1987, Steane Kremerskothen broke the all-time record with 303 TFL matches playing for Clarence and North Launceston/Northern Bombers until 1999. As a prerequisite of the league going statewide, it was deemed that the regional competitions (TANFL, NTFA and NWFU) of pre-1986 were now granted equal status and therefore Kremerskothen's 49 matches with Launceston in the NTFA from 1982–1984 gave him 352 senior matches at Tier One level, also an all-time record.

== Record premiership titles as coach: TANFL ==
- 6 – Jack Metherell (North Hobart) in 1938, 1939, 1940, 1941, 1945 and 1947
- 5 – Bruce Carter (Cananore) in 1909, 1910, 1911, 1913, 1914
- 4 – Paul Sproule (Sandy Bay and Hobart) in 1976, 1977, 1978 and 1980

== Record score: TANFL ==
- 39.17 (251) – New Norfolk v Clarence 11.12 (78) – 14 July 1983 at Boyer Oval
- 34.21 (225) – Glenorchy v Hobart 18.14 (122) – 20 August 1983 at KGV Football Park
- 34.18 (222) – Lefroy v Cananore 17.13 (115) – 1934 at TCA Ground
- 33.23 (221) – Clarence v Hobart 8.13 (61) – 23 April 1983 at Bellerive Oval
- 33.20 (218) – Glenorchy v Sandy Bay 10.9 (69) – 28 April 1985 at KGV Football Park

== Highest losing score: TANFL ==
- 24.10 (154) – New Norfolk v Glenorchy 26.11 (167) – 8 September 1983 at North Hobart Oval

== Record quarter score: TANFL ==
- 16.3 (99) – Glenorchy v Hobart 4.4 (28) – (4th Quarter) – 25 August 1983 at KGV Football Park
- 15.2 (92) – New Norfolk v Clarence 3.2 (20) – (4th Quarter) – 14 July 1983 at Boyer Oval

== Record lowest score: TANFL ==
- 0.7 (7) – Clarence v Glenorchy 15.20 (110) – 3 May 1958 at KGV Football Park

== Record individual goalkicker (career): TANFL and TFL ==
- 1049 – Wayne Fox (Glenorchy, New Norfolk, Hobart, South Launceston and Sandy Bay) from 1975–1991
- 994 – Peter Hudson (New Norfolk & Glenorchy) from 1963–1966, 1975–1976 and 1978–1981
- 682 – Alan Rait (North Hobart) from 1927–1932 and 1935–1937
- 666 – Ian Westell (Sandy Bay) from 1946–1957

== Record individual goalkicker (season): TANFL ==
- 179 – Peter Hudson (Glenorchy) – 1979

== Record individual goalkicker (match): TANFL ==
- 18.2 – Peter Hudson (Glenorchy) v Hobart – 30 June 1979 at TCA Ground
- 16.4 – Peter Hudson (Glenorchy) v North Hobart – 11 August 1979 at North Hobart Oval
- 15.6 – Peter Hudson (Glenorchy) v Hobart – 19 May 1979 at KGV Football Park
- 15.3 – Bernie Waldron (Hobart) v Clarence – 30 August 1952 at TCA Ground
- 15.3 – Alf Sampson (New Town) v Lefroy – 23 August 1941 at TCA Ground

== Record individual goalkicker (Grand Final): TANFL ==
- 10 – Alan Rait (North Hobart) v Cananore – 1932 at North Hobart Oval
- 10 – Terry Mayne (Clarence) v New Norfolk – 12 September 1970 at North Hobart Oval

== Record individual goalkicker (preliminary final): TANFL ==
- 10 – Peter Hudson (Glenorchy) v Clarence – 4 September 1976 at North Hobart Oval

== Record individual goalkicker (second semi final): TANFL ==
- 11 – David Garlick (Clarence) v New Norfolk – 5 September 1981 at North Hobart Oval

== Record individual goalkicker (first semi final): TANFL ==
- 14 – Peter Hudson (Glenorchy) v Hobart – 29 August 1981 at North Hobart Oval
- 13 – Wayne Ling (Clarence) v Hobart – 21 August 1976 at North Hobart Oval
- 12 – Darryl Sutton (North Hobart) v New Norfolk – 1 September 1984 at North Hobart Oval
- 10 – Tony Browning (New Norfolk) v North Hobart – 22 August 1970 at North Hobart Oval

== Record winning margins: TANFL ==
- 173 points – New Norfolk 39.17 (251) v Clarence 11.12 (78) – 14 July 1983 at Boyer Oval
- 163 points – New Town 32.19 (211) v New Norfolk 6.12 (48) – 21 August 1954 at New Town Oval
- 160 points – Clarence 33.23 (221) v Hobart 8.13 (61) – 23 April 1983 at Bellerive Oval
- 159 points – Clarence 30.29 (209) v North Hobart 7.8 (50) – 24 August 1985 at Bellerive Oval

== Longest suspension ==
- 40 matches – Neville Hill (New Norfolk) – 9 August 1980 – Queenborough Oval

Note: Suspended until 31 December 1983 (51 matches), later reduced to 30 June 1982 (40 matches) on appeal.

== Record roster match attendances: TANFL ==
- 8,840 – Glenorchy v Clarence – 12 June 1967 at North Hobart Oval
- 8,760 – Hobart v New Town – 13 June 1949 at North Hobart Oval
- 8,593 – Nth Hobart v Clarence – 15 April 1968 at North Hobart Oval
- 7,981 – New Norfolk v Clarence – 14 June 1965 at North Hobart Oval
- 7,976 – Nth Hobart v Sandy Bay – 17 April 1965 at North Hobart Oval

== Record roster match attendances: Tasmanian State League ==
- 8,480 – Glenorchy v Clarence – 2 April 2011 at KGV Football Park (Night)
- 4,157 – Clarence v Glenorchy – 5 April 2010 at Bellerive Oval (Night)

== Record finals match attendances: TANFL ==
- 24,968 – Clarence v Glenorchy – 1979 TANFL Grand Final at North Hobart Oval
- 24,413 – Clarence v New Norfolk – 1970 TANFL Grand Final at North Hobart Oval
- 20,775 – Sandy Bay v New Norfolk – 1964 TANFL Grand Final at North Hobart Oval
- 20,364 – Sandy Bay v Clarence – 1971 TANFL Grand Final at North Hobart Oval
- 20,193 – Clarence v New Norfolk – 1981 TANFL Grand Final at North Hobart Oval

== Record finals match attendances: Tasmanian State League ==
- 7,534 – Clarence v Glenorchy – 2009 TSL Grand Final at Bellerive Oval
- 6,658 – Launceston v Burnie – 2011 TSL Grand Final at Aurora Stadium
- 6,128 – North Launceston v Glenorchy – 2016 TSL Grand Final at Aurora Stadium
- 6,123 – Clarence v Devonport – 2010 TSL Grand Final at Bellerive Oval

== See also ==
- List of VFL/AFL records
- List of AFL Women's records
- List of SANFL records
- List of WAFL records
