= Glenelg v Central District (1975 SANFL season) =

1975 SANFL Home-and-away
| Glenelg | Central District |
|---|---|
| 49.23 (317) | 11.13 (79) |
| | 1 | 2 | 3 | 4 |
|---|---|---|---|---|
| GLE | 12.6 | 25.12 | 34.17 | 49.23 |
| CEN | 3.2 | 6.4 | 10.7 | 11.13 |
- Date: 23 August 1975
- Stadium: Glenelg Oval
- Attendance: 6,960
- Umpires: Bob Scholefield
- Result: Glenelg won by 238 points

The 1975 Glenelg vs Central District SANFL match was a home-and-away fixture of the 1975 SANFL season, played on 23 August 1975 at Glenelg Oval in Adelaide, South Australia. Glenelg defeated Central District by 238 points, the largest winning margin in the history of the SANFL. The result is one of the most one-sided matches in senior Australian rules football.

== Background ==
Glenelg was one of the stronger sides of the decade, having won the 1973 premiership, while Central District was still in finals reckoning at the time of the match, one win and percentage behind fifth-placed North Adelaide. However, with a growing injury list, they fielded 11 players aged 20 or younger against the fit, experienced Tigers.

The previous SANFL record score was by North Adelaide, who kicked 34.22 (226) against South Adelaide 6.12 (48) at the Adelaide Oval on 13 May 1972.

Earlier in the season, on 31 May 1975, Glenelg 33.14 (212) had defeated Central District 9.17 (71) by 141 points at Football Park. The previous season, on 8 June 1974, Central District 17.16 (118) defeated Glenelg 18.9 (117) by 1 point at Elizabeth Oval.

== Match summary ==
Glenelg dominated from the opening bounce and continued to score heavily across all four quarters. By quarter time, they led by nine goals, and the margin expanded relentlessly.

The final score was Glenelg 49.23 (317) to Central District 11.13 (79). Full forward Fred Phillis kicked 18 goals, with centre half-forward Peter Carey contributing eight.

=== Goalkickers ===
- Glenelg: F. Phillis 18.6; Carey 8.2; Bennett 4.3; Caldwell 4.2; Hodgeman 4.1; Rebbeck 4.1; MacFarlane 2.2; Marker 1.1; Copping 1.1; Weston 1.1; Rady 1.1; Cornes 1.0; rushed 0.2.
- Central District: Wyley 2.4; Reed 2.1; Hughes 1.1; Beythien 1.1; M. Norsworthy 1.1; Casserley 1.0; McKay 1.0; Price 1.0; B. Norsworthy 1.0; McLay 0.2; Krieg 0.1; Moore 0.1; Lindner 0.1.

=== Best players (as reported) ===
- Glenelg: F. Phillis; Tardif; Carey; Bennett; Marker; W. Phillis; MacFarlane.
- Central District: Moore; M. Norsworthy; Wyley; B. Norsworthy; Krieg.

=== Officials and attendance ===
- Umpire: Bob Scholefield.
- Attendance: 6,960 at Glenelg Oval.

== Aftermath ==
The 317 point scored by Glenelg and 238 point margin have remained as SANFL records. Glenelg qualified for the 1975 finals but lost to Norwood in the grand final.

Fred Phillis' 18 goals is the fourth-largest individual tally in SANFL history, behind 23 goals by "Bos" Daly in 1893 and again by Ken Farmer in 1940, and 19 goals by Bruce Schultz in 1941.

Central District finished the season in seventh place with 6 wins and 12 losses.

== See also ==
- List of SANFL records
