= List of SANFL records =

This is a list of records from the South Australian National Football League since its inception in 1877 (previously known as the South Australian Football Association and the South Australian Football League).

== Club records ==
=== Largest score ===
Rank	Score	Club	Opponent	Year	Round	Venue
1	49.23 (317)	Glenelg	Central District	1975	17	Glenelg Oval
2	39.16 (250)	South Adelaide	Woodville	1984	14	Football Park
3	37.21 (243)	Port Adelaide	Woodville	1980	3	Football Park
4	36.21 (237)	West Adelaide	West Torrens	1982	8	Richmond Oval
5	35.23 (233)	Central District	West Torrens	1988	4	Elizabeth Oval

=== Lowest conceded score ===
The lowest scores since the modern scoring system was adopted in 1897.

Rank	Score	Club	Opponent	Year	Round	Venue
1	0.0 (0)	West Torrens	Port Adelaide	1899	2	Alberton Oval
1	0.0 (0)	West Torrens	Port Adelaide	1897	7	Alberton Oval
1	0.0 (0)	West Adelaide	North Adelaide	1897	4	Adelaide Oval
1	0.0 (0)	West Torrens	Norwood	1897	2	Kensington Oval
1	0.0 (0)	West Adelaide	Norwood	1897	1	Kensington Oval
1	0.0 (0)	West Torrens	Port Adelaide	1897	1	Alberton Oval

== Individual records ==
=== Most career goals ===
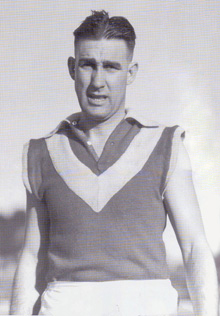
Ken Farmer

Note: These tallies refer to goals kicked in premiership matches (home-and-away and finals matches) only.

Rank	Goals	Games	Player	Club(s)	Career
1	1417	224	Ken Farmer	North Adelaide	1929–1941
2	993	230	Tim Evans	Port Adelaide	1975–1986
3	836	268	Fred Phillis	Glenelg	1966–1981
4	817	177	Jack Owens	Glenelg	1924–1935
5	753	334	Rick Davies	Sturt; South Adelaide	1970–1980, 1982–1986

=== Most goals in a game ===
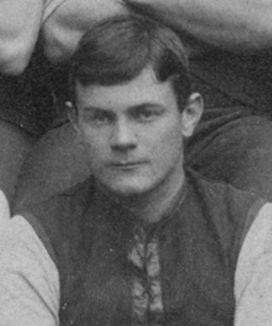
Anthony Daly

Rank	Goals	Player	Club	Opponent	Year	Round	Ground
1	23	Ken Farmer	North Adelaide	West Torrens	1940	Round 12	Prospect Oval
1	23	Anthony Daly	Norwood	Adelaide	1893	Round 16	Kensington Oval

=== Most goals in a season ===
Rank	Goals	Player	Club	Year
1	153	Scott Hodges	Port Adelaide	1990
2	151	Rick Davies	Sturt	1983
3	146	Tim Evans	Port Adelaide	1980
4	137	Fred Phillis	Glenelg	1969
5	134	Ken Farmer	North Adelaide	1936

=== Most seasons as leading goalkicker ===
Rank	Seasons	Player	Club
1	11	Ken Farmer	North Adelaide
2	7	Anthony Daly	Norwood
3	6	Tim Evans	Port Adelaide
4	5	Fred Phillis	Glenelg

=== Most games for each club ===
Note: These tallies refer to games played in premiership matches (home-and-away and finals matches) only.

Rank	Games	Player	Club	Career span
1	423	Peter Carey	Glenelg	1971–1988
2	367	Russell Ebert	Port Adelaide	1968–1978, 1980–1985
3	353	Paul Bagshaw	Sturt	1964–1980
4	336	Garry McIntosh	Norwood	1982–1998
5	334	Michael Redden	North Adelaide	1978–1993
=6	327	Grantley Fielke	West Adelaide	1979–1986, 1988–1990, 1992–1997
=6	327	Lindsay Head	West Torrens	1952–1970
8	322	Stuart Palmer	South Adelaide	1969–1985
9	301	Ralph Sewer	Woodville	1969–1980, 1984–1990
10	292	Peter Vivian	Central District	1969–1985
11	266	Justin Cicolella	Eagles	1998–2012
12	89	Kieran Strachan	Adelaide	2019–present

=== Most Magarey Medals ===
Awards	Player	Club(s)	Years
4	Russell Ebert	Port Adelaide	1971, 1974, 1976, 1980
3	Tom MacKenzie	West Torrens; North Adelaide	1902, 1905, 1906
3	Walter Scott	Norwood	1921, 1924, 1930
3	Dan Moriatry	South Adelaide	1919, 1920, 1921
3	Len Fitzgerald	Sturt	1952, 1954, 1959
3	Lindsay Head	West Torrens	1955, 1958, 1963
3	Barrie Robran	North Adelaide	1968, 1970, 1973
3	James Allan	North Adelaide	2007, 2010, 2011

=== Most club best and fairest awards ===
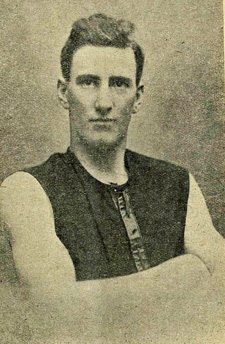
Walter Scott

Awards	Player	Club(s)	Years
9	Bob Hank	West Torrens	1945, 1946, 1947, 1948, 1949, 1950, 1952, 1953, 1957
8	Lindsay Head	West Torrens	1955, 1956, 1958, 1959, 1962, 1963, 1966, 1967
7	Barrie Robran	North Adelaide	1967, 1968, 1969, 1970, 1971, 1972, 1973
7	Rick Davies	Sturt	1973, 1974, 1975, 1976, 1978, 1979, 1980
7	Peter Darley	South Adelaide	1963, 1964, 1966, 1967, 1968, 1972, 1973
6	Russell Ebert	Port Adelaide	1971, 1972, 1974, 1976, 1977, 1981
6	Walter Scott	Norwood	1920, 1921, 1923, 1926, 1928, 1930
6	Michael Taylor	Norwood	1973, 1974, 1978, 1979, 1980, 1986

=== Most premierships as player ===
Rank	Awards	Player	Club(s)	Years
1	9	Geof Motley	Port Adelaide	1954, 1955, 1956, 1957, 1958, 1959, 1962, 1963, 1965
1	9	Chris Gowans	Central District	2000, 2001, 2003, 2004, 2005, 2007, 2008, 2009, 2010
1	9	James Gowans	Central District	2000, 2001, 2003, 2004, 2005, 2007, 2008, 2009, 2010
2	8	Neville Hayes	Port Adelaide	1954, 1955, 1956, 1957, 1958, 1959, 1962, 1963
2	8	Greg Phillips	Port Adelaide	1977, 1979, 1980, 1981, 1988, 1989, 1990, 1992
2	8	Scott Hodges	Port Adelaide	1988, 1989, 1990, 1992, 1994, 1995, 1996, 1998
2	8	Paul Northeast	Port Adelaide	1989, 1990, 1992, 1994, 1995, 1996, 1998, 1999
2	8	Matthew Slade	Central District	2000, 2001, 2003, 2004, 2005, 2007, 2008, 2009

=== Most SANFL games coached ===
Rank	Games	Coach	Clubs
1	777	Jack Oatey	Norwood; West Adelaide; Sturt
2	628	Neil Kerley	West Adelaide; South Adelaide; Glenelg; West Torrens; Central District
3	574	Fos Williams	Port Adelaide; South Adelaide; West Adelaide
4	533	John Cahill	Port Adelaide; West Adelaide; South Adelaide

== Kicks after the siren ==
=== Goal to win ===
Player	Team	Opponent	Year	Score	Details
Alby Williams	South Adelaide	West Torrens	1923	90–86	
Laurence Matulich	West Torrens	Glenelg	1939	104–99	
Gordon Scott	West Torrens	West Adelaide	1939	104–103	
John Taylor Jr	West–Glenelg	Port–Torrens	1942	89–88	
Jim Thoms	West Torrens	North Adelaide	1945	33–32	
Peter Mead	Port Adelaide	South Adelaide	1965	112–107	
Graham Cornes	Glenelg	Norwood	1977	98–95	
Darren Harris	South Adelaide	Port Adelaide	1984	117–115	
David Rodan	Norwood	West Adelaide	2012	37–36	
Liam Delahunty	West Adelaide	Woodville-West Torrens	2023	86–80	

=== Goal to draw ===
Player	Team	Opponent	Year	Score	Details
Dean Dawson	Norwood	Port Adelaide	1904	37–37	
Tom Leahy	North Adelaide	Sturt	1928	80–80	
Justin McConnell	Glenelg	Central District	2009	81–81	

=== Behind to win ===
Player	Team	Opponent	Year	Score	Details
Richard Townsend	Norwood	West Torrens	1911	40–39	
Ossie Bertram	West Torrens	Port Adelaide	1932	82–81	
Toby Pink	Glenelg	North Adelaide	2016	56–55	Under-18s Grand Final

=== Missed opportunities ===
A list of instances where a player had a shot at goal after the siren to win or draw the game but missed, resulting in a loss, or instances where a player has had a kick after the siren with scores level but failed to score.

Player	Team	Opponent	Year	Score	Outcome	Details
Edward Nancarrow	South Adelaide	Norwood	1907	51–56	Norwood win by 5 points	
Clarence Gittings	South Adelaide	North Adelaide	1915			
Vincentus Leahy	North Adelaide	West Torrens	1919	32–35	No score (fell short)	
Arnold Caust	South Adelaide	Norwood	1921	37–42	Behind (over the goal post)	
Jack Owens	Glenelg	Norwood	1924	71–72	Behind	
Frank Tucker	North Adelaide	Port Adelaide	1928	87–90	Behind	
Horrie Blight	West Torrens	Sturt	1936	98–101	No score (fell short)	
Ian McKay	North Adelaide	Glenelg	1948	114–116	Behind	
Don Prior	West Torrens	West Adelaide	1952	49–50	West Adelaide win by a point.	

== See also ==
- List of VFL/AFL records
- List of VFL/AFL reserves records
- List of Tasmanian Football League records
- List of VFA/VFL records
- List of WAFL records
