= List of WAFL records =

This is a list of records from the West Australian Football League (WAFL) since its inception in 1885 (formerly known as the West Australian Football Association, West Australian National Football League, Western Australia State Football League and Westar Rules).

== Team Records ==
=== Highest Score ===
Rank	Score	Team	Opponent	Year 2025	Round	Ground
1	41.30 (276)	East Perth	South Fremantle	1944	Round 1	Perth Oval
2	40.18 (258)	South Fremantle	West Perth	1981	Round 21	Fremantle Oval
3	39.20 (254)	Claremont	Perth	1981	Round 17	Claremont Oval
4	40.11 (251)	Swan Districts	Subiaco	1979	Round 19	Bassendean Oval
5	38.21 (249)	Swan Districts	Subiaco	1982	Round 2	Bassendean Oval

Note: The score of 41.30 (276) by East Perth against South Fremantle in 1944 was in an under-19 competition due to the loss of players to serve in World War II, and is excluded in some sources. The score of 40.18 (258) by South Fremantle against West Perth in 1981 is the record in WAFL senior competition.

=== Lowest Score ===
Rank	Score	Team	Opponent	Year	Round	Ground
1	0.0 (0)	Subiaco	South Fremantle	1906	Round 14	North Fremantle Oval
1	0.0 (0) †	Peel Thunder	Claremont	2004	Round 1	Rushton Park
3	0.1 (1)	Perth	West Perth	1899	Round 17	WACA
4	0.2 (2)	East Fremantle	Rovers	1898	Round 1	WACA
4	0.2 (2)	Subiaco	East Perth	1920	Round 13	Perth Oval
† Peel Thunder scored 10.10 (70) for the match, but their score was deleted as a penalty for playing former Fitzroy and Subiaco rover Peter Bird without a clearance.

=== Most Consecutive Wins ===
Rank	Streak	Team	Start	End
1	35	East Fremantle	1945, Round 13	1947, Round 3
2	25	Subiaco	2017, Grand Final	2019, Round 6
3	21	East Perth	1944, Round 1	1944 Grand Final
4	19	East Perth	1958, Preliminary Final	1959, Round 17
4	19	Subiaco	2006, Round 12	2007, Round 7
4	19	Subiaco	2017, Round 2	2017, Semi Final
5	18	Swan Districts	1979, Round 17	1980, Round 13
5	18	Claremont	1991, Round 7	1992, Round 1

== Player Records ==
=== Most games ===
Note: These figures refer to premiership matches (i.e. home-and-away and finals matches) only.

Rank	Games	Player	Clubs	Years
1	367	Mel Whinnen	West Perth	1960-1977
2	341	Bill Dempsey	West Perth	1960-1976
3	332^{1}	Jack Sheedy	East Fremantle, East Perth	1942-1944, 1946-1962
4	306	Brian Peake	East Fremantle, Perth	1972-1981, 1986-1990
5	304	Bill Walker	Swan Districts	1961-1976

^{1} Sheedy played 30 games in 1942-1944, which was in an under-19 competition due to the loss of players to serve in World War II: these games are excluded in some sources, which list Sheedy as playing 302 WAFL games.

The only other players to play 300 WAFL games were Kris Miller (East Fremantle and South Fremantle), who played 303 games between 1999 and 2014, and Tony Notte (Swan Districts), who has played 322 games from 2008 to present.

=== Most career goals ===
Rank	Goals	Games	Player	Clubs	Years
1	1212	251	Austin Robertson, Jr.	Subiaco	1962-1965, 1967-1974
2	1196	228	Ted Tyson	West Perth	1930-1941, 1945
3	1095	202	George Doig	East Fremantle	1933-1945
4	1034	192	Bernie Naylor	South Fremantle	1941, 1946-1954
5	910	190	Raymond Scott	West Perth	1944, 1947-1955, 1959

=== Most goals in a season ===
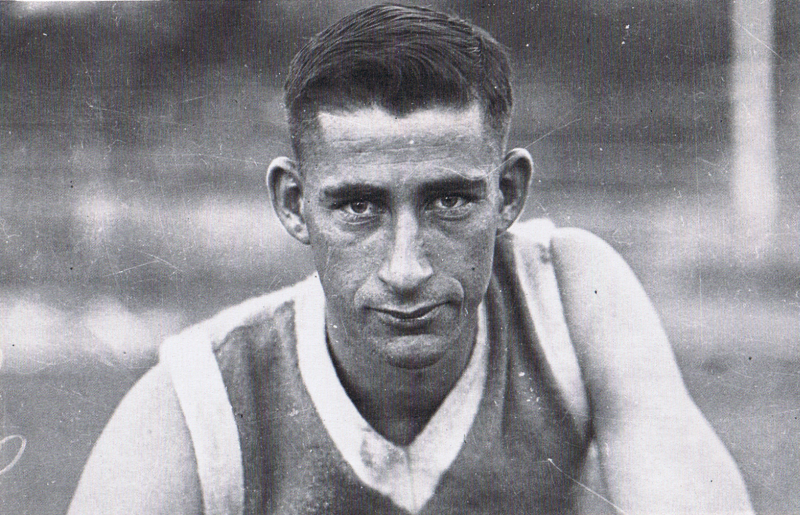
George Doig

Rank	Goals	Player	Club	Year
1	167	Bernie Naylor	South Fremantle	1953
2	160	Austin Robertson, Jr.	Subiaco	1968
3	152	George Doig	East Fremantle	1934
4	147	Bernie Naylor	South Fremantle	1952
5	144	George Doig	East Fremantle	1937

=== Most goals in a game ===
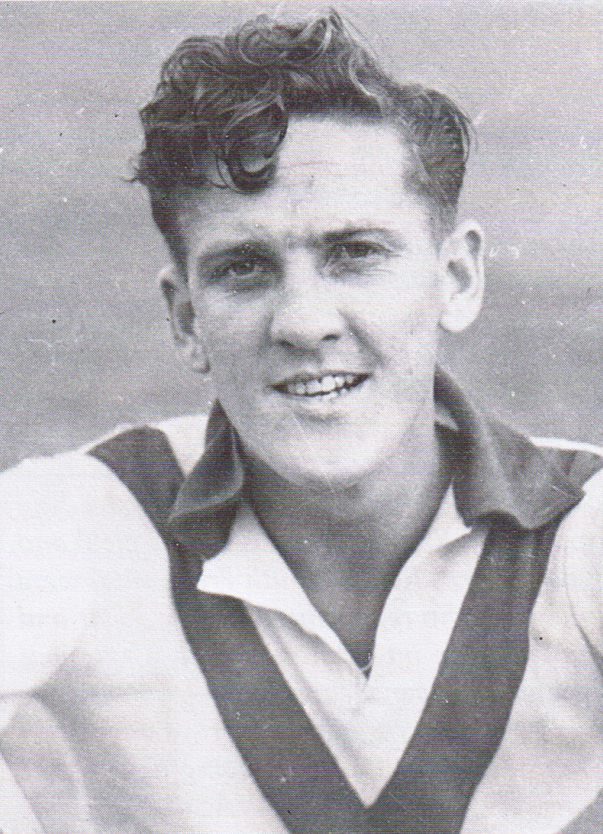
Bernie Naylor

Rank	Goals	Player	Club	Opponent	Year	Round	Ground
1	23	Bernie Naylor	South Fremantle	Subiaco	1953	Round 16	Fremantle Oval
2	19	Bernie Naylor	South Fremantle	East Fremantle	1952	Round 18	Fremantle Oval
2	19	George Doig	East Fremantle	Claremont	1934	Round 19	Fremantle Oval
2	19	George Moloney	Claremont	Swan Districts	1940	Round 16	Claremont Oval
5	18	Bernie Naylor	South Fremantle	Subiaco	1953	Round 2	Fremantle Oval

=== Most Sandover Medals ===
Medals	Player	Team	Seasons
4	Bill Walker	Swan Districts	1965, 1966, 1967, 1970
3	Haydn Bunton, Sr.	Subiaco	1938, 1939, 1941
3	Merv McIntosh	Perth	1948, 1953, 1954
3	Graham Farmer	East Perth	1956, 1957, 1960
3	Barry Cable	Perth	1964, 1968, 1973

== Kicks after the siren ==
=== Goal to win ===
Player	Team	Opponent	Year	Score	Details
Doug Oliphant	Perth	South Fremantle	1932	66–60	
McGarry	West Perth	Victoria Park	1934	80–79	
Bill Holmes	Swan Districts	East Fremantle	1968	102–101	
Peter Melesso	Claremont	South Fremantle	1987	136–134	
Chris Gerreyn	Claremont	East Fremantle	1995	71–67	
Adam Prior	East Perth	Claremont	2012	91–90	
Kyle Anderson	East Perth	Perth	2018	83–80	
Mitch Dobson	West Perth	Perth	2022	54–48	
Tom Edwards	Swan Districts	West Coast reserves	2023	83-80	

=== Behind to win ===
Player	Team	Opponent	Year	Score	Details
Rainoldi	West Perth	South Fremantle	1934	121–120	
Noel Carter	South Fremantle	East Fremantle	1983	128–127	

=== Behind to draw ===
Player	Team	Opponent	Year	Score	Details
Peter Melesso	Claremont	Subiaco	1987	89–89	
Peter Melesso	Claremont	Swan Districts	1988	76–76	
Kristian Cary	Perth	West Coast reserves	2023	98–98	

=== Missed opportunities ===
Player	Team	Opponent	Year	Score	Outcome	Details
Jared Hardisty	Claremont	South Fremantle	2021	64–65	Claremont would have made the 2021 grand final.	

== See also ==
- List of VFL/AFL records
- List of VFL/AFL reserves records
- List of SANFL records
- List of Tasmanian Football League records
- List of VFA/VFL records
