= 1971 TANFL season =

Australian rules football season

- Teams: Clarence Kangaroos; Glenorchy Magpies; Hobart Tigers; New Norfolk Eagles; North Hobart Demons; Sandy Bay Seagulls
- Premiers: Sandy Bay
- Minor premiers: Clarence; 2nd minor premiership

Attendance
- Matches played: 65
- Total attendance: 271,427 (4,176 per match)

The 1971 Tasmanian Australian National Football League (TANFL) premiership season was an Australian rules football competition staged in Hobart, Tasmania over twenty roster rounds and five finals series matches (one match was drawn) between 3 April and 25 September 1971.

== Participating Clubs ==
- Clarence District Football Club
- Glenorchy District Football Club
- Hobart Football Club
- New Norfolk District Football Club
- North Hobart Football Club
- Sandy Bay Football Club

=== 1971 TANFL Club Coaches ===
- John Bingley (Clarence)
- Trevor Sprigg (Glenorchy)
- Dennis Munari (Hobart)
- Ricky Graham (New Norfolk)
- John Devine (North Hobart)
- Rod Olsson (Sandy Bay)

=== TANFL Reserves Grand Final ===
(Saturday, 18 September 1971)

- Sandy Bay 12.16 (88) v New Norfolk 11.5 (71) – North Hobart Oval

=== TANFL Under-19's Grand Final ===
- New Norfolk 17.13 (115) v Lindisfarne 13.10 (88) – North Hobart Oval

=== State Preliminary Final ===
(Saturday, 18 September 1971)

- Latrobe 13.13 (91) v Scottsdale 9.14 (68) – Att: 10,543 at York Park

=== State Grand Final ===
(Saturday, 2 October 1971)

- Sandy Bay: 0.5 (5) | 4.10 (34) | 6.13 (49) | 12.14 (86)
- Latrobe: 1.5 (11) | 2.9 (21) | 3.13 (31) | 8.17 (65)
- Attendance: 11,329 at North Hobart Oval

=== Intrastate Matches ===
Jubilee Shield (Saturday, 1 May 1971)

- TANFL 19.12 (126) v NWFU 14.11 (95) – Att: 5,027 at West Park Oval

Jubilee Shield (Saturday, 29 May 1971)

- TANFL 19.12 (126) v NTFA 12.7 (79) – Att: 9,579 at North Hobart Oval

=== Interstate Match ===
(Monday, 14 June 1971)

- South Australia 17.14 (116) v Tasmania 12.12 (84) – Att: 20,548 at North Hobart Oval

=== Leading Goalkickers: TANFL ===
- Terry Mayne (Clarence) – 74
- Ben Nusteling (New Norfolk) – 69
- John Guiver (Sandy Bay) – 63
- Lance Morton (Sandy Bay) – 62

=== Medal Winners ===
- Rod Olsson (Sandy Bay) – William Leitch Medal
- Les Barrett (New Norfolk) – George Watt Medal (Reserves)
- Tim Woodham (New Norfolk) – V.A Geard Medal (Under-19's)
- Adrian Bowden (Clarence) – Weller Arnold Medal (Best player in Intrastate matches)

== 1971 TANFL Ladder ==
Pos	Team	Pld	W	L	D	PF	PA	PP	Pts
1	Clarence	20	14	6	0	2045	1851	110.5	56
2	New Norfolk	20	13	7	0	1954	1760	111.0	52
3	Sandy Bay	20	12	8	0	2169	1889	114.8	48
4	Glenorchy	20	9	11	0	1939	1943	99.8	36
5	North Hobart	20	7	13	0	1687	2024	83.3	32 (Note: 4 bonus points?)
6	Hobart	20	5	15	0	1746	2073	84.2	20

=== Round 1 ===
(Saturday, 3 April 1971)

- New Norfolk 17.17 (119) v Nth Hobart 9.7 (61) – Att: 4,534 at North Hobart Oval
- Clarence 12.18 (90) v Glenorchy 12.15 (87) – Att: 3,819 at Bellerive Oval
- Sandy Bay 17.16 (118) v Hobart 12.16 (88) – Att: 3,679 at Queenborough Oval

=== Round 2 ===
(Saturday, 10 April & Monday, 12 April 1971)

- Sandy Bay 25.15 (165) v Glenorchy 20.17 (137) – Att: 4,700 at North Hobart Oval
- Nth Hobart 16.13 (109) v Hobart 14.24 (108) – Att: 3,043 at TCA Ground
- New Norfolk 15.22 (112) v Clarence 12.15 (87) – Att: 6,931 at North Hobart Oval (Monday)

=== Round 3 ===
(Saturday, 17 April 1971)

- Sandy Bay 17.17 (119) v Nth Hobart 11.9 (75) – Att: 5,423 at North Hobart Oval
- Hobart 14.20 (104) v Clarence 10.11 (71) – Att: 3,340 at TCA Ground
- New Norfolk 15.10 (100) v Glenorchy 12.9 (81) – Att: 2,857 at Boyer Oval

=== Round 4 ===
(Saturday, 24 April 1971)

- New Norfolk 13.24 (102) v Hobart 9.16 (70) – Att: 3,469 at North Hobart Oval
- Clarence 25.19 (169) v Sandy Bay 15.14 (104) – Att: 4,781 at Bellerive Oval
- Glenorchy 14.17 (101) v Nth Hobart 13.16 (94) – Att: 3,316 at KGV Football Park

=== Round 5 ===
(Saturday, 1 May 1971)

- Nth Hobart 14.19 (103) v Clarence 15.9 (99) – Att: 4,251 at North Hobart Oval
- Sandy Bay 16.11 (107) v New Norfolk 12.14 (86) – Att: 2,799 at Queenborough Oval
- Glenorchy 12.15 (87) v Hobart 6.10 (46) – Att: 2,971 at KGV Football Park

=== Round 6 ===
(Saturday, 8 May 1971)

- Sandy Bay 13.18 (96) v Hobart 11.19 (85) – Att: 3,602 at North Hobart Oval
- Clarence 18.17 (125) v Glenorchy 13.16 (94) – Att: 3,913 at Bellerive Oval
- New Norfolk 9.19 (73) v Nth Hobart 10.10 (70) – Att: 2,317 at Boyer Oval

=== Round 7 ===
(Saturday, 15 May 1971)

- Nth Hobart 19.20 (134) v Hobart 16.10 (106) – Att: 3,853 at North Hobart Oval
- Clarence 14.19 (103) v New Norfolk 13.10 (88) – Att: 3,475 at Boyer Oval
- Glenorchy 19.11 (125) v Sandy Bay 17.10 (112) – Att: 3,580 at KGV Football Park

=== Round 8 ===
(Saturday, 22 May 1971)

- New Norfolk 20.19 (139) v Glenorchy 20.10 (130) – Att: 4,189 at North Hobart Oval
- Sandy Bay 20.26 (146) v Nth Hobart 7.14 (56) – Att: 3,383 at Queenborough Oval
- Clarence 18.24 (132) v Hobart 14.14 (98) – Att: 3,106 at TCA Ground

=== Round 9 ===
(Saturday, 5 June 1971)

- Clarence 13.12 (90) v Sandy Bay 9.17 (71) – Att: 6,656 at North Hobart Oval
- Hobart 16.14 (110) v New Norfolk 13.13 (91) – Att: 1,777 at TCA Ground
- Nth Hobart 11.17 (83) v Glenorchy 6.14 (50) – Att: 3,111 at KGV Football Park

=== Round 10 ===
(Saturday, 12 June 1971)

- Glenorchy 16.9 (105) v Hobart 7.18 (60) – Att: 3,544 at North Hobart Oval
- New Norfolk 12.11 (83) v Sandy Bay 12.10 (82) – Att: 2,086 at Boyer Oval
- Clarence 14.11 (95) v Nth Hobart 11.9 (75) – Att: 3,620 at Bellerive Oval

=== Round 11 ===
(Saturday, 19 June 1971)

- Nth Hobart 19.5 (119) v New Norfolk 17.16 (118) – Att: 3,569 at North Hobart Oval
- Sandy Bay 23.28 (166) v Hobart 8.10 (58) – Att: 2,431 at Queenborough Oval
- Glenorchy 19.17 (131) v Clarence 13.11 (89) – Att: 3,561 at KGV Football Park

=== Round 12 ===
(Saturday, 26 June 1971)

- New Norfolk 12.3 (75) v Clarence 9.3 (57) – Att: 2,875 at North Hobart Oval
- Sandy Bay 9.13 (67) v Glenorchy 8.14 (62) – Att: 2,201 at Queenborough Oval
- Hobart 12.13 (85) v Nth Hobart 4.12 (36) – Att: 1,393 at TCA Ground

=== Round 13 ===
(Saturday, 3 July 1971)

- Sandy Bay 11.12 (78) v Nth Hobart 9.8 (62) – Att: 3,970 at North Hobart Oval
- New Norfolk 19.11 (125) v Glenorchy 7.15 (57) – Att: 2,110 at Boyer Oval
- Clarence 12.11 (83) v Hobart 11.13 (79) – Att: 2,582 at Bellerive Oval

=== Round 14 ===
(Saturday, 10 July 1971)

- Glenorchy 10.8 (68) v Nth Hobart 9.9 (63) – Att: 3,852 at North Hobart Oval
- Clarence 15.24 (114) v Sandy Bay 13.13 (91) – Att: 4,555 at Bellerive Oval
- New Norfolk 13.16 (94) v Hobart 9.6 (60) – Att: 1,963 at Boyer Oval

=== Round 15 ===
(Saturday, 17 July 1971)

- Clarence 20.9 (129) v Nth Hobart 12.10 (82) – Att: 3,865 at North Hobart Oval
- Sandy Bay 20.15 (135) v New Norfolk 14.12 (96) – Att: 3,079 at Queenborough Oval
- Glenorchy 18.19 (127) v Hobart 12.9 (81) – Att: 2,242 at KGV Football Park

=== Round 16 ===
(Saturday, 24 July 1971)

- Clarence 20.16 (136) v Glenorchy 12.10 (82) – Att: 5,231 at North Hobart Oval
- Hobart 23.21 (159) v Sandy Bay 14.11 (95) – Att: 2,179 at TCA Ground
- New Norfolk 21.11 (137) v Nth Hobart 12.9 (81) – Att: 1,903 at Boyer Oval

=== Round 17 ===
(Saturday, 31 July 1971)

- Hobart 14.11 (95) v Nth Hobart 12.12 (84) – Att: 2,624 at North Hobart Oval
- Clarence 16.10 (106) v New Norfolk 9.8 (62) – Att: 4,057 at Bellerive Oval
- Sandy Bay 17.10 (112) v Glenorchy 16.11 (107) – Att: 2,630 at KGV Football Park

=== Round 18 ===
(Saturday, 7 August 1971)

- Clarence 15.10 (100) v Hobart 11.17 (83) – Att: 3,866 at North Hobart Oval
- Glenorchy 13.16 (94) v New Norfolk 9.10 (64) – Att: 3,020 at KGV Football Park
- Nth Hobart 14.23 (107) v Sandy Bay 14.13 (97) – Att: 2,801 at Queenborough Oval

=== Round 19 ===
(Saturday, 14 August 1971)

- Nth Hobart 13.21 (99) v Glenorchy 11.8 (74) – Att: 3,367 at North Hobart Oval
- Sandy Bay 20.16 (136) v Clarence 6.7 (43) – Att: 4,000 at Queenborough Oval
- New Norfolk 15.13 (103) v Hobart 11.12 (78) – Att: 1,741 at TCA Ground

=== Round 20 ===
(Saturday, 21 August 1971)

- New Norfolk 12.15 (87) v Sandy Bay 9.18 (72) – Att: 5,670 at North Hobart Oval
- Clarence 18.19 (127) v Nth Hobart 14.10 (94) – Att: 3,928 at Bellerive Oval
- Glenorchy 20.20 (140) v Hobart 12.21 (93) – Att: 1,809 at TCA Ground

=== First Semi Final ===
(Saturday, 28 August 1971)

- Sandy Bay: 6.8 (44) | 10.16 (76) | 11.21 (87) | 15.28 (118)
- Glenorchy: 4.4 (28) | 9.9 (63) | 14.12 (96) | 16.13 (109)
- Attendance: 10,265 at North Hobart Oval

=== Second Semi Final ===
(Saturday, 4 September 1971)

- Clarence: 4.2 (26) | 8.3 (51) | 14.6 (90) | 18.9 (117)
- New Norfolk: 5.2 (32) | 12.4 (76) | 13.6 (84) | 17.12 (114)
- Attendance: 12,777 at North Hobart Oval

=== Preliminary Final ===
(Saturday, 11 September 1971)

- Sandy Bay: 8.4 (52) | 11.4 (70) | 15.7 (97) | 15.8 (98)
- New Norfolk: 2.1 (13) | 4.9 (33) | 9.14 (68) | 13.20 (98)
- Attendance: 8,857 at North Hobart Oval

=== Preliminary Final Replay ===
(Saturday, 18 September 1971)

- Sandy Bay: 4.4 (28) | 9.5 (59) | 13.10 (88) | 18.14 (122)
- New Norfolk: 5.3 (33) | 9.9 (63) | 11.11 (77) | 16.16 (112)
- Attendance: 13,765 at North Hobart Oval

=== Grand Final ===
(Saturday, 25 September 1971)

- Sandy Bay: 7.4 (46) | 13.9 (87) | 17.11 (113) | 18.13 (121)
- Clarence: 4.1 (25) | 7.4 (46) | 10.11 (71) | 16.16 (112)
- Attendance: 20,364 at North Hobart Oval

Source: All scores and statistics courtesy of the Hobart Mercury and Saturday Evening Mercury (SEM) publications.
