= 1964 TANFL season =

Australian rules football season

- Teams: Clarence Kangaroos; Glenorchy Magpies; Hobart Tigers; New Norfolk Eagles; North Hobart Robins; Sandy Bay Seagulls
- Premiers: Sandy Bay
- Minor premiers: New Norfolk; 2nd minor premiership

Attendance
- Matches played: 61
- Total attendance: 252,302 (4,136 per match)

The 1964 Tasmanian Australian National Football League (TANFL) premiership season was an Australian Rules football competition staged in Hobart, Tasmania over nineteen (19) roster rounds and four (4) finals series matches between 4 April and 12 September 1964.

== Participating Clubs ==
- Clarence District Football Club
- Glenorchy District Football Club
- Hobart Football Club
- New Norfolk District Football Club
- North Hobart Football Club
- Sandy Bay Football Club

=== 1964 TANFL Club Coaches ===
- Geoff Frier (Clarence)
- Bobby Parsons (Glenorchy)
- Mal Pascoe (Hobart)
- Trevor Leo (New Norfolk)
- Darrell Eaton (North Hobart)
- Rex Geard (Sandy Bay)

=== TANFL Reserves Grand Final ===
- Clarence 8.6 (54) v New Norfolk 8.3 (51) – North Hobart Oval

=== TANFL Under-19's Grand Final ===
State Schools Old Boys Football Association (SSOBFA) (Saturday, 19 September 1964)

- Buckingham 8.5 (53) v New Norfolk 4.14 (38) – New Town Oval

=== State Preliminary Final ===
(Saturday, 19 September 1964)

- Scottsdale: 3.2 (20) | 5.6 (36) | 7.12 (54) | 13.14 (92)
- Sandy Bay: 0.5 (5) | 7.8 (50) | 10.14 (74) | 11.17 (83)
- Attendance: 10,993 at North Hobart Oval

=== State Grand Final ===
(Saturday, 26 September 1964)

- Cooee: 3.9 (27) | 7.11 (53) | 12.14 (86) | 15.16 (106)
- Scottsdale: 1.2 (8) | 10.9 (69) | 12.10 (82) | 14.14 (98)
- Attendance: 9,700 at West Park Oval

=== Intrastate Matches ===
Jubilee Shield (Saturday, 2 May 1964)

- TANFL 14.16 (100) v NWFU 13.17 (95) – Att: 11,443 at North Hobart Oval

Jubilee Shield (Saturday, 23 May 1964)

- NTFA 15.17 (107) v TANFL 15.9 (99) – Att: 6,751 at York Park

Inter-Association Match (Saturday, 15 June 1964)

- TANFL 15.19 (109) v Huon FA 10.4 (64) – Att: 1,250 at Huonville Rec. Ground

=== Interstate Matches ===
Interstate Match (Saturday, 6 June 1964)

- Victorian FA 14.11 (95) v Tasmania 10.8 (68) – Att: 9,288 at York Park

Interstate Match (Wednesday, 24 June 1964)

- Western Australia 24.15 (159) v Tasmania 5.7 (37) – Att: 10,313 at North Hobart Oval

=== Leading Goalkickers: TANFL ===
- Peter Hudson (New Norfolk) – 86
- Scott Palfreyman (Sandy Bay) – 70
- John Mills (Clarence) – 63
- Jeremy Thiessen (Hobart) – 40
- Mal Pascoe (Hobart) – 38
- W.Butler (Sandy Bay) – 38

=== Medal Winners ===
- David Sullivan (Hobart) – William Leitch Medal
- Ken Latham (New Norfolk) – George Watt Medal (Reserves)
- Harold "Boy" Wilton (Clarence) – V.A Geard Medal (Under-19's)
- Dale Flint (Sandy Bay) – Weller Arnold Medal (Best player in Intrastate matches)

== 1964 TANFL Ladder ==
Pos	Team	Pld	W	L	D	PF	PA	PP	Pts
1	New Norfolk	19	13	6	0	1613	1401	115.1	52
2	Sandy Bay	19	11	8	0	1466	1472	99.6	44
3	Glenorchy	19	9	10	0	1457	1415	103.0	36
4	Hobart	19	9	10	0	1356	1362	99.6	36
5	Clarence	19	8	10	1	1442	1437	100.3	34
6	North Hobart	19	6	12	1	1178	1425	82.7	26

=== Round 1 ===
(Saturday, 4 April 1964)

- New Norfolk 13.12 (90) v Nth Hobart 5.12 (42) – Att: 4,437 at North Hobart Oval
- Hobart 11.14 (80) v Glenorchy 10.12 (72) – Att: 3,311 at TCA Ground
- Sandy Bay 15.8 (98) v Clarence 12.13 (85) – Att: 3,827 at Bellerive Oval

=== Round 2 ===
(Saturday, 11 April 1964)

- Clarence 13.20 (98) v Glenorchy 11.15 (81) – Att: 5,124 at North Hobart Oval
- New Norfolk 10.10 (70) v Hobart 6.11 (47) – Att: 3,009 at Boyer Oval
- Sandy Bay 11.17 (83) v Nth Hobart 9.11 (65) – Att: 3,278 at Queenborough Oval

=== Round 3 ===
(Saturday, 18 April 1964)

- Clarence 11.14 (80) v Nth Hobart 7.9 (51) – Att: 4,585 at North Hobart Oval
- New Norfolk 14.8 (92) v Glenorchy 11.14 (80) – Att: 4,198 at KGV Park
- Sandy Bay 14.12 (96) v Hobart 10.9 (69) – Att: 3,507 at Queenborough Oval

=== Round 4 ===
(Saturday, 25 April 1964)

- Hobart 10.19 (79) v Nth Hobart 6.12 (48) – Att: 3,272 at TCA Ground
- Sandy Bay 12.15 (87) v Glenorchy 9.14 (68) – Att: 4,441 at KGV Park
- New Norfolk 13.13 (91) v Clarence 12.10 (82) – Att: 4,710 at Boyer Oval *

Note: All-time attendance record at Boyer Oval.

=== Round 5 ===
(Saturday, 9 May 1964)

- Glenorchy 11.21 (87) v Nth Hobart 9.15 (69) – Att: 3,673 at North Hobart Oval
- Sandy Bay 16.17 (113) v New Norfolk 13.14 (92) – Att: 6,070 at Queenborough Oval *
- Clarence 13.17 (95) v Hobart 9.11 (65) – Att: 2,885 at Bellerive Oval

Note: All-time attendance record at Queenborough Oval.

=== Round 6 ===
(Saturday, 16 May 1964)

- Sandy Bay 12.9 (81) v Clarence 11.14 (80) – Att: 7,364 at North Hobart Oval
- Hobart 8.8 (56) v Glenorchy 7.9 (51) – Att: 2,995 at KGV Park
- New Norfolk 15.16 (106) v Nth Hobart 12.9 (81) – Att: 2,410 at Boyer Oval

=== Round 7 ===
(Saturday, 23 May 1964)

- Nth Hobart 10.12 (72) v Sandy Bay 6.13 (49) – Att: 3,253 at North Hobart Oval
- Hobart 15.21 (111) v New Norfolk 9.5 (59) – Att: 2,143 at TCA Ground
- Clarence 13.13 (91) v Glenorchy 3.10 (28) – Att: 3,287 at KGV Park

=== Round 8 ===
(Saturday, 30 May 1964)

- New Norfolk 16.15 (111) v Glenorchy 16.11 (107) – Att: 3,410 at North Hobart Oval
- Hobart 11.10 (76) v Sandy Bay 9.17 (71) – Att: 3,726 at TCA Ground
- Clarence 15.11 (101) v Nth Hobart 8.10 (58) – Att: 4,119 at Bellerive Oval

=== Round 9 ===
(Saturday, 6 June 1964)

- Nth Hobart 8.15 (63) v Hobart 8.13 (61) – Att: 3,084 at North Hobart Oval
- Glenorchy 18.9 (117) v Sandy Bay 9.16 (70) – Att: 3,220 at Queenborough Oval
- Clarence 10.8 (68) v New Norfolk 8.11 (59) – Att: 3,205 at Boyer Oval

=== Round 10 ===
(Saturday, 13 June & Monday, 15 June 1964)

- Sandy Bay 12.13 (85) v New Norfolk 11.10 (76) – Att: 5,637 at North Hobart Oval
- Glenorchy 13.22 (100) v Nth Hobart 6.9 (45) – Att: 3,463 at KGV Park
- Clarence 12.13 (85) v Hobart 3.15 (33) – Att: 6,894 at North Hobart Oval (Monday)

=== Round 11 ===
(Saturday, 20 June 1964)

- New Norfolk 13.13 (91) v Nth Hobart 10.5 (65) – Att: 2,812 at North Hobart Oval
- Glenorchy 16.9 (105) v Hobart 14.13 (97) – Att: 2,832 at TCA Ground
- Sandy Bay 16.6 (102) v Clarence 14.7 (91) – Att: 4,677 at Bellerive Oval

=== Round 12 ===
(Saturday, 27 June 1964)

- New Norfolk 14.14 (98) v Hobart 13.15 (93) – Att: 3,654 at North Hobart Oval
- Nth Hobart 14.12 (96) v Sandy Bay 9.12 (66) – Att: 2,933 at Queenborough Oval
- Glenorchy 13.9 (87) v Clarence 9.17 (71) – Att: 3,862 at Bellerive Oval

=== Round 13 ===
(Saturday, 4 July 1964)

- Nth Hobart 8.12 (60) v Clarence 8.12 (60) – Att: 3,527 at North Hobart Oval
- Hobart 11.12 (78) v Sandy Bay 7.10 (52) – Att: 2,682 at Queenborough Oval
- New Norfolk 11.13 (79) v Glenorchy 5.11 (41) – Att: 2,803 at Boyer Oval

=== Round 14 ===
(Saturday, 11 July 1964)

- Nth Hobart 11.8 (74) v Hobart 9.7 (61) – Att: 3,051 at North Hobart Oval
- Glenorchy 14.6 (90) v Sandy Bay 10.5 (65) – Att: 3,075 at KGV Park
- New Norfolk 26.22 (178) v Clarence 8.4 (52) – Att: 3,096 at Bellerive Oval

=== Round 15 ===
(Saturday, 18 July 1964)

- Nth Hobart 9.9 (63) v Glenorchy 8.11 (59) – Att: 4,823 at North Hobart Oval
- Hobart 13.11 (89) v Clarence 9.8 (62) – Att: 3,133 at TCA Ground
- Sandy Bay 9.16 (70) v New Norfolk 9.10 (64) – Att: 3,177 at Boyer Oval

=== Round 16 ===
(Saturday, 25 July 1964)

- Glenorchy 11.8 (74) v Hobart 6.6 (42) – Att: 4,212 at North Hobart Oval
- Sandy Bay 12.15 (87) v Clarence 5.9 (39) – Att: 3,223 at Queenborough Oval
- New Norfolk 8.10 (58) v Nth Hobart 9.2 (56) – Att: 2,418 at Boyer Oval

=== Round 17 ===
(Saturday, 1 August 1964)

- Sandy Bay 10.15 (75) v Nth Hobart 11.5 (71) – Att: 3,229 at North Hobart Oval
- Clarence 13.14 (92) v Glenorchy 11.5 (71) – Att: 3,149 at KGV Park
- New Norfolk 11.7 (73) v Hobart 10.10 (70) – Att: 2,452 at TCA Ground

=== Round 18 ===
(Saturday, 8 August 1964)

- Hobart 10.8 (68) v Sandy Bay 8.8 (56) – Att: 3,079 at North Hobart Oval
- Glenorchy 9.11 (65) v New Norfolk 7.5 (47) – Att: 2,589 at KGV Park
- Nth Hobart 5.9 (39) v Clarence 4.14 (38) – Att: 2,240 at Bellerive Oval

=== Round 19 ===
(Saturday, 15 August 1964)

- Glenorchy 10.14 (74) v Sandy Bay 8.11 (59) – Att: 5,650 at North Hobart Oval
- Hobart 11.14 (80) v Nth Hobart 9.4 (58) – Att: 2,497 at TCA Ground
- New Norfolk 11.13 (79) v Clarence 10.11 (71) – Att: 3,752 at Bellerive Oval

=== First Semi Final ===
(Saturday, 22 August 1964)

- Hobart: 3.3 (21) | 6.6 (42) | 7.9 (51) | 9.12 (66)
- Glenorchy: 3.4 (22) | 4.7 (31) | 6.11 (47) | 8.11 (59)
- Attendance: 11,759 at North Hobart Oval

=== Second Semi Final ===
(Saturday, 29 August 1964)

- New Norfolk: 6.4 (40) | 6.6 (42) | 10.11 (71) | 13.12 (90)
- Sandy Bay: 2.3 (15) | 5.6 (36) | 7.8 (50) | 11.9 (75)
- Attendance: 13,451 at North Hobart Oval

=== Preliminary Final ===
(Saturday, 5 September 1964)

- Sandy Bay: 3.2 (20) | 6.4 (40) | 7.9 (51) | 12.11 (83)
- Hobart: 2.2 (14) | 5.6 (36) | 7.10 (52) | 8.14 (62)
- Attendance: 11,737 at North Hobart Oval

=== Grand Final ===
(Saturday, 12 September 1964)

- Sandy Bay: 2.4 (16) | 6.8 (44) | 9.10 (64) | 11.11 (77)
- New Norfolk: 3.3 (21) | 4.7 (31) | 4.11 (35) | 9.11 (65)
- Attendance: 20,775 at North Hobart Oval
