= Claude Clough =

Australian rules footballer

Personal information
- Full name: Claude Hamilton Clough
- Born: 8 October 1884; St Kilda, Victoria
- Died: 23 February 1922 (aged 37); St Kilda, Victoria
- Original team: Collegians
- Debut: 1900, St Kilda vs. Melbourne

Playing career^{1}
Years	Club	Games (Goals)
1900–1901	St Kilda	23 (8)
- ^{1} Playing statistics correct to the end of 1901.

Claude Hamilton Clough (8 October 1884 – 23 February 1922) was an Australian rules footballer who played with St Kilda in the Victorian Football League (VFL) during the early 1900s.

He holds the record as the youngest-ever player in the league, having made his debut at 15 years, 209 days. Until March 2012, the record was thought to be held by Keith Bromage, who made his debut at 15 years and 287 days. Research by the official AFL historians discovered that Clough was born in 1884, not the previously thought 1880.

Clough's first game of league football in 1900 was notable, as the result of the match was overturned almost a week after the game concluded. The match finished as a draw, with both teams having scored 68 points, but a point kicked by Melbourne at the end of the third quarter was later disallowed and St Kilda was awarded the win. (It would take 106 years before another game's result would be later overturned—coincidentally involving St Kilda—in the infamous Sirengate match.) The 1900 victory with Clough also marked St Kilda's first win since they entered the league in 1897, and it was their only win for the season.

Clough died at his home in Fulton Street, St Kilda, in February 1922, aged 37.
