= Keith Bromage =

Australian rules footballer (1937–2024)

Personal information
- Born: 8 November 1937
- Died: 26 June 2024 (aged 86); Perth, Western Australia, Australia
- Original team: Collingwood Thirds
- Height: 183 cm (6 ft 0 in)
- Weight: 74 kg (163 lb)

Playing career^{1}
Years	Club	Games (Goals)
1953–1956	Collingwood	28 (30)
1958–1961	Fitzroy	41 (48)
Total		69 (78)
- ^{1} Playing statistics correct to the end of 1961.

Keith Bromage (8 November 1937 – 26 June 2024) was an Australian rules footballer. He played with Collingwood and Fitzroy in his Victorian Football League (VFL) career.

When he debuted against Richmond in 1953 at 15 years and 287 days of age, he was thought to be the youngest debutant in the history of the game. However, in 2012 it was discovered that Claude Clough was aged 15 years and 209 days when he made his debut for St Kilda in May 1900. Bromage moved to Fitzroy in 1958, and was the VFL reserves leading goalkicker in 1959, with 66 goals.

From 1962 to 1965 he was captain-coach of Manuka Football Club in Canberra.

In 1968, while playing for Dimboola, he was the leading goal-kicker for the Wimmera Football League.

Bromage died of brain cancer on 26 June 2024, age the age of 86.
