= 1975 SANFL season =

- Teams: 10
- Premiers: Norwood; 23rd premiership
- Minor premiers: Norwood; 15th minor premiership
- Magarey Medallist: Peter Woite; Port Adelaide (20 votes)
- Ken Farmer Medallist: Fred Phillis; Glenelg (108 Goals)

Attendance
- Matches played: 96
- Total attendance: 880,466 (9,172 per match)
- Highest: 53,283 (Grand Final, Norwood vs. Glenelg)

The 1975 South Australian National Football League season was the 96th season of the top-level Australian rules football competition in South Australia.

Glenelg won the second semi-final and were premiership favourites. However Norwood won the grand final, their first premiership in 25 years.

== Ladder ==
1975 SANFL Ladder
Pos	Team	Pld	W	L	D	PF	PA	PP	Pts
1	Norwood (P)	18	16	2	0	2210	1620	57.70	32
2	Glenelg	18	15	3	0	2872	1740	62.27	30
3	Sturt	18	15	3	0	2251	1446	60.89	30
4	Port Adelaide	18	12	6	0	2278	1845	55.25	24
5	North Adelaide	18	8	10	0	1869	2305	44.78	16
6	West Adelaide	18	7	11	0	1855	1980	48.37	14
7	Central District	18	6	12	0	1708	2247	43.19	12
8	South Adelaide	18	5	13	0	1687	2245	42.90	10
9	Woodville	18	4	14	0	1686	2283	42.48	8
10	West Torrens	18	2	16	0	1806	2511	41.83	4

Rules for classification: 1) points; 2) percentage; 3) number of points for.
(P) Premiers

== Finals series (Major Round) ==
=== Qualifying and Elimination Finals ===
	Elimination Final
Saturday, 6 September (2:10 pm)	Port Adelaide 11.32 (98)	def.	North Adelaide 8.20 (68)	Football Park (crowd: 16,585)

	Qualifying Final
Sunday, 7 September (2:10 pm)	Glenelg 17.24 (126)	def.	Sturt 15.10 (100)	Football Park (crowd: 25,770)	Report

=== Semi-finals ===
	First semi-final
Saturday, 13 September (2:10 pm)	Sturt 5.23 (53)	def. by	Port Adelaide 18.12 (120)	Football Park (crowd: 26,107)

	Second semi-final
Sunday, 14 September (2:10 pm)	Norwood 16.10 (106)	def. by	Glenelg 21.9 (135)	Football Park (crowd: 32,719)	Report

=== Preliminary final ===
	Preliminary Final
Saturday, 20 September (2:10 pm)	Norwood 11.19 (85)	def.	Port Adelaide 8.7 (55)	Football Park (crowd: 36,128)

=== Grand Final ===
1975 SANFL Grand Final
Saturday, 27 September (2:10 pm)	Glenelg	def. by	Norwood	Football Park (crowd: 53,283)
1.3 (9); 5.4 (34); 6.7 (43); 7.10 (52)	Q1; Q2; Q3; Final	3.5 (23); 4.6 (30); 6.9 (45); 9.10 (64)

== Events ==
- On 23 August (Round 17), Glenelg 49.23 (317) defeated Central Districts 11.13 (79), setting a new record SANFL score which still stands today. Glenelg's winning margin of 238 points is also still their biggest winning margin in SANFL history.

The previous SANFL record was owned by North Adelaide, which kicked 34.22 (226) against South Adelaide 6.12 (48) at Adelaide Oval on 13 May 1972.
