= List of AFL Women's records =

This is a list of records from the AFL Women's (AFLW) competition since its first season in 2017.

== Club records ==
=== Premierships ===
Titles	Club	Seasons
3	Adelaide	2017, 2019, 2022 (S6)
2	Brisbane	2021, 2023
2	North Melbourne	2024, 2025
1	Melbourne	2022 (S7)
1	Western Bulldogs	2018

There were no premiers for the 2020 season of the AFL Women's competition as it was ended prematurely due to the outbreak of COVID-19

=== Runners-up ===
Titles	Club	Seasons
5	Brisbane	2017, 2018, 2022 (S7), 2024, 2025
1	Melbourne	2022 (S6)
1	Adelaide	2021
1	Carlton	2019
1	North Melbourne	2023

=== Highest scores ===
Rank	Score	Club	Opponent	Year	Round	Venue
1	18.6 (114)	North Melbourne	Fremantle	2025 (S10)	3	Fremantle Oval
2	16.12 (108)	Port Adelaide	Gold Coast	2025 (S10)	3	Alberton Oval
3	16.11 (107)	Melbourne	Fremantle	2022 (S6)	9	Perth Stadium
4	16.10 (106)	Adelaide	Greater Western Sydney	2023 (S8)	4	Manuka Oval
5	17.3 (105)	Brisbane	Fremantle	2025 (S10)	2	Fremantle Oval
6	15.13 (103)	Sydney	Gold Coast	2025 (S10)	2	Carrara Stadium
7	15.12 (102)	Geelong	Sydney	2022 (S7)	10	Kardinia Park
Source: (Last updated: 31 August 2025)

=== Lowest scores ===
Rank	Score	Club	Opponent	Year	Round	Venue
1	0.1 (1)	St Kilda	Western Bulldogs	2026 (S11)	8	Mars Stadium
1	0.1 (1)	West Coast	Melbourne	2022 (S7)	10	Casey Fields
1	0.1 (1)	Sydney	North Melbourne	2022 (S7)	6	Punt Road Oval
1	0.1 (1)	Greater Western Sydney	Adelaide	2022 (S7)	5	Unley Oval
1	0.1 (1)	Fremantle	Geelong	2022 (S7)	2	Fremantle Oval
6
6	0.2 (2)	Greater Western Sydney	North Melbourne	2023 (S8)	5	Arden Street Oval
6	0.2 (2)	Sydney	Port Adelaide	2022 (S7)	4	Alberton Oval
6	0.2 (2)	St Kilda	Carlton	2022 (S6)	7	Princes Park
6	0.2 (2)	Gold Coast	Brisbane	2021 (S5)	2	Casey Fields
Source: (Last updated: 24 September 2023)

== Goalkicking ==
=== Most goals in a game ===
Rank	Score	Player	Club	Opponent	Year	Round	Venue
1	7.3	Brooke Lochland	Western Bulldogs	Carlton	2018	4	Whitten Oval
1	7.3	Chloe Molloy	Sydney	Gold Coast	2025	2	Carrara Stadium
3	6.2	Jamie Stanton	Gold Coast	West Coast	2023	2	Carrara Stadium
3	6.0	Greta Bodey	Hawthorn	St Kilda	2024	4	Moorabbin Oval
3	6.0	Aishling Moloney	Geelong	West Coast	2024	9	Lathlain Park
3	6.0	Jasmine Garner	North Melbourne	Port Adelaide	2025	2	Arden Street Oval
3	6.0	Jacqueline Parry	Geelong	St Kilda	2026	2	GMHBA Stadium
Source: . Last updated: 26 October 2023.

=== Kicks after the siren ===
==== Goal to win ====
	Player	Club	Opponent	Year	Score	Details
1	Katherine Smith	Greater Western Sydney	St Kilda	2022 (S6)	41–39	
2	Aisling McCarthy	Fremantle	Melbourne	2024	47–41	

==== Goal to draw ====
	Player	Club	Opponent	Year	Score	Details
1	Jamie Stanton	Gold Coast	Greater Western Sydney	2024	36–36	

==== Missed opportunities ====
A list of instances where a player had a shot at goal after the siren to win or draw the game but missed, resulting in a loss, or instances where a player has had a kick after the siren with scores level but failed to score.

	Player	Team	Opponent	Year	Score	Outcome	Details
1	Greta Bodey	Brisbane	Melbourne	2021	36–38	No score (fell short)	
2	Greta Bodey	Brisbane	Melbourne	2022 (S6)	32–35	Behind (touched in the goal square)	
3	Emma Kearney	North Melbourne	Brisbane	2023	33–35	No score (fell short)	
4	Grace Campbell	Collingwood	Melbourne	2025	33-37	Behind	

== See also ==
- AFL Women's games records
- AFL Women's goalkicking records
