= Australian rules football in Tasmania =

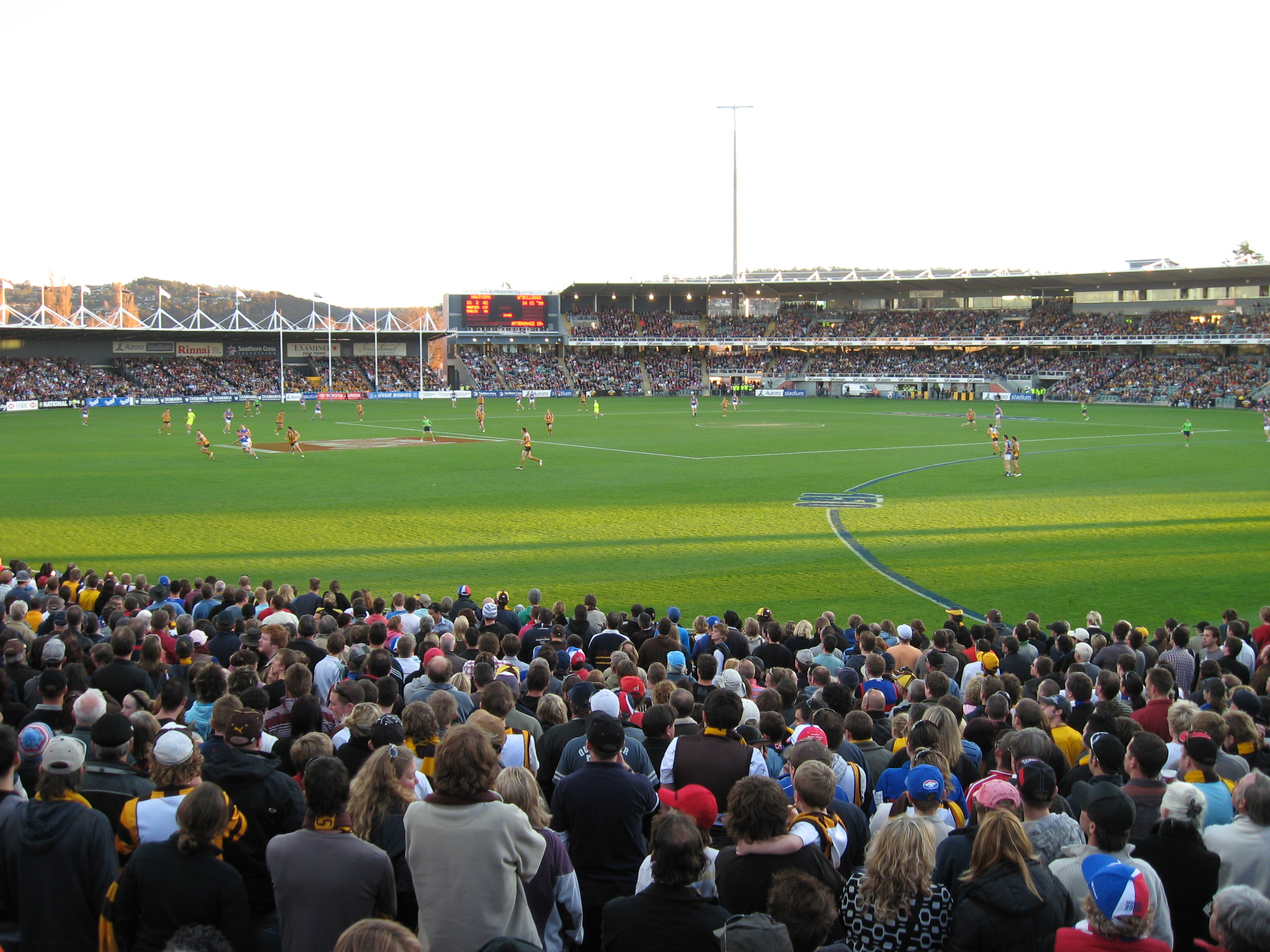
- 2008 AFL Season (R10) match at Aurora Stadium in Launceston
- Governing body: AFL Tasmania
- Representative team: Tasmania
- First played: 1866; 160 years ago
- Registered players: 13,927 (adult); 8,455 (child)
- Clubs: 86

Club competitions
- List: Tasmanian State League; North West Football League; Northern Tasmanian Football Association; Southern Football League; Circular Head Football Association; Darwin Football Association; King Island Football Association; Leven Football Association; North East Football Union; North Western Football Association; Oatlands District Football Association; Old Scholars Football Association

Audience records
- Single match: 24,968 (1979). TFL Grand Final Glenorchy v Clarence (North Hobart Oval, Hobart)

In Tasmania, Australian rules football (known mainly as "football" or "footy") is a popular spectator and participation sport. It has been played since the late 1860s and draws the largest audience for any football code in the state. A 2018 study of internet traffic showed that 79% of Tasmanians are interested in the sport, the highest rate in the country. It is governed by AFL Tasmania and according to Ausplay there are 13,927 adult players with a participation rate of 2.5% per capita about a quarter of which are female playing across 12 competitions.

It has experienced a significant fall in participation since the 2000s when it was the most participated team sport with the highest per capita participation in the country however is now outside of the top 10 participation sports. While it remains popular in the state's north and Launceston, its popularity has fallen in the south and in the state's capital Hobart. With the collapse of numerous clubs and competitions, the sport has undergone numerous restructures over the years. The general consensus is that the state has fallen into the blind spot of national governing bodies for decades which prompted the Government of Australia to launch a Senate inquiry in 2008.

The Tasmanian state team competed in senior interstate and State of Origin football between 1887 and 1993, winning matches against all other Australian states (including Victoria, firstly in their 1960 match and most recently in their second last encounter in 1990) as well as several second division titles (including 1908 and 1947). Peter Hudson represented Tasmania more times than any other player, with 19 caps. Tasmania continues to field underage sides in the national underage championships and remains a successful side with 8 Division two titles, the most recent in 2018. Tasmania has also fielded teams in the VFL (2001–2008), the TAC Cup (1996–2002; 2019-) and defeated a NEAFL representative side in 2013 as the Tasmania Mariners/Devils. Today the Tasmanian State League continues to plays inter-league representative matches and defeated Queensland in 2024.

Australian Football League (AFL) premiership matches have been played every year except 2020 since 2001 with the first held at the North Hobart Oval in 1952. Tasmania is the only state without a team in the AFL or AFL Women's (AFLW). However, after 30 years of campaigning, the league's 18 clubs unanimously approved a 19th license to the state on 1 May 2023, and it is expected to debut in 2028 along with the construction of the new Macquarie Point Stadium to be completed by 2029. Until the 2010s, Tasmanian television audiences for the AFL were also among the highest per capita, consistently drawing bigger ratings than both Queensland and New South Wales. The decline in the code's participation and television audience increased the urgency of establishing an AFL club.

Over 300 Tasmanians have played the game at the highest level and the state has traditionally supplied the AFL with a disproportionately high number of players. Tasmania has four Australian Football Hall of Fame legends: Darrell Baldock, Peter Hudson, Ian Stewart and Royce Hart. The Tasmanian born and raised player with most AFL games is Jack Riewoldt with 346 and the most AFL goals is Matthew Richardson with 800, while Jess Wuetschner has the most AFLW games with 55 and most AFLW goals with 42.

== History ==
=== English public school games: 1851–1879 ===
Organised "Foot-ball" matches have been recorded in Van Diemens Land since 1851 and matches in southern Tasmanian towns of Hobart and Richmond between 1853 and 1855 significantly pre-date those recorded across Bass Strait in suburban Melbourne.

In July 1859, closely mirroring Tom Wills' famous 1858 football letter in Melbourne, a Hobart newspaper published a letter calling on the town's cricketers and cricket clubs to take up winter football to keep active during the off-season. However, unlike the Victorian movement, the Hobart initiative immediately stalled due to an inability to source a football to play with.

Early matches played in Tasmania may have been an early form of rugby football, pointing to early mentions of goal posts with cross-bars and offside rules of later Tasmanian clubs.

Accounts from Tasmanians of these early matches indicate that, as in early Victoria, they played mostly English public school football games particularly Rugby football, Harrow football and Eton football (the latter being similar to soccer) among others.

However, apart from the fact that they were organised and played, few details of these matches actually survive, and the popularity of football in the fast-growing colony of Victoria quickly eclipsed the following that the pastime had in newly named colony of Tasmania.

==== First football clubs and introduction of the Victorian rules: 1864–1878 ====
The "football" club formed in New Town in 1864 is believed to be the earliest in Tasmania – but it disbanded soon after. A series of high-profile matches were played between New Town and Hobart Football Club (now defunct) in late May 1866. It is not known under which rules these games were played, though based on descriptions and the timing (official rules were distributed in the Australasian on 19 May) these matches are thought very likely to have been under the Victorian Rules. Unlike other colonies however not long later, cricket clubs passed a motion prohibiting football from being played on their grounds proving a major setback for the code in the colony.

By the mid- to late 1860s, more stable clubs, including Derwent and Stowell Football, emerged.

In 1871 the Break O'Day club was formed followed in 1875 by the Launceston Football Club and Launceston Church Grammar School in 1876.

Even by 1876, Tasmanian clubs had not decided on which rules to play. "Victorian Football Rules" began to gain favour only as the strong growth of the code in Victoria and Queensland became evident, even still most clubs preferred to play by their own rules

Other clubs to form were Longford (1878) and Cornwall (1879), which became City in 1880. The City and Richmond clubs were formed in 1877 and the Oatlands and Railway clubs in 1879.

New Town formally started in 1878 and along with City and Richmond formed the basis of the game in Hobart, while in Launceston the above-mentioned clubs formed the basis for the NTFA. New Norfolk District Football Club (1878) was one of the stronger regional clubs and North Hobart Football Club (1881) is another survivor of these early years.

=== Intercolonial football and adoption of the Victorian rules: 1879 to 1885 ===
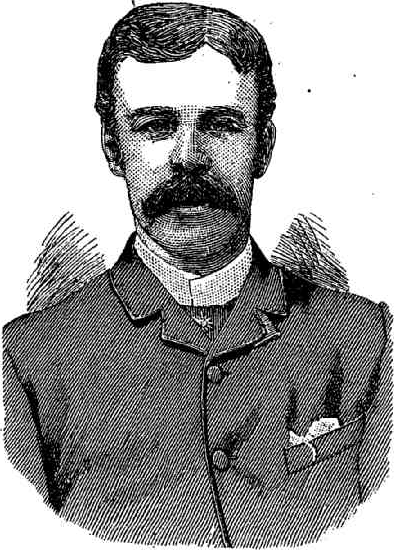
W. H. Cundy, Captain of the Tasmanian Football Team in 1887

On 1 May 1879, members of the Tasmanian Cricket Association met and decided to form a club for their members, to be called Cricketers. They initially adopted English Association Rules (soccer) before succumbing to the pressure to play Victorian Rules.

In June 1879 clubs in Hobart formed the Tasmanian Football Association (TFA), with founding clubs Hobart Town (City), New Town, Railway, Cricketers, Hutchins School, High School and Richmond. The Mercury on 16 and 17 June 1879 described the TFA's first adopted playing rules as originating a Tasmanian football code.

In 1879 the Hotham Football Club (now North Melbourne) wrote to Tasmanian clubs for an intercolonial challenge. The Tasmanians initially deferred the challenge due to no uniform rules among its clubs. On July 5, 1881, it played a combined Hobart team defeated them 3 goals 2 in front of 1500 spectators.

More intercolonials against Victorian clubs followed shortly after the official adoption of the code. The Essendon Football Club visited in 1882 playing against a combined Tasmanian side in front of more than 3,000 spectators.

In November 1883 the TFA and clubs from Launceston sent delegates C.H. Westwood and W.H. Cundy to the intercolonial football rules conference in Melbourne, where they were tasked with convincing the other colonies to adopt the Tasmanian (TFA) rules. After the delegates returned home unsuccessful, by 1885 football clubs across all of Tasmania had adopted without alteration the Victorian rules.

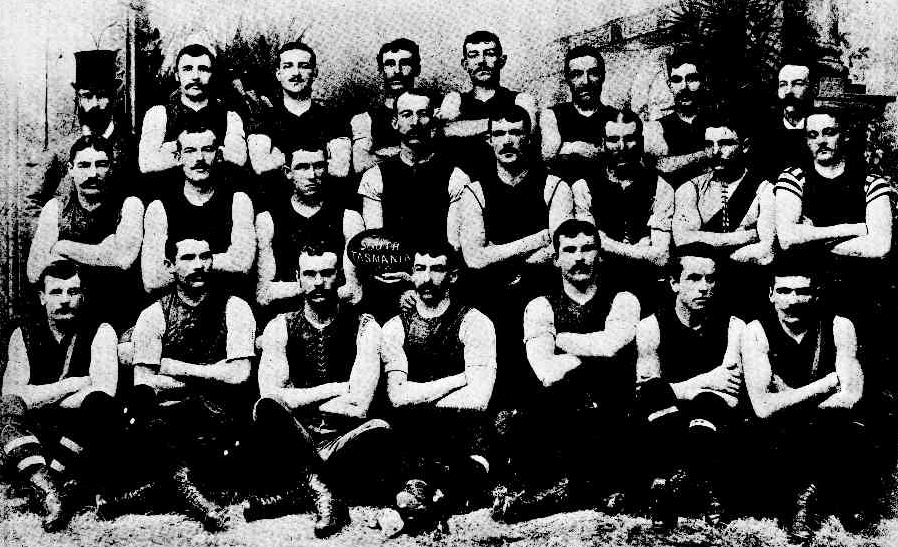
South Tasmanian football team that toured Sydney in 1890

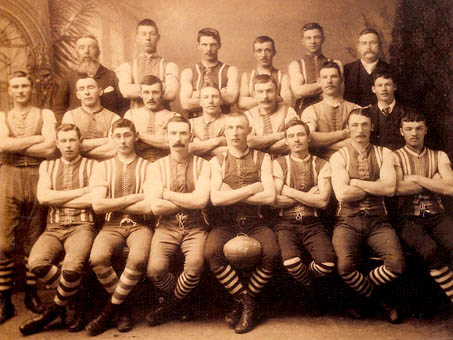
New Norfolk Football Club in 1892

=== Development of an intrastate rivalry: 1900– ===
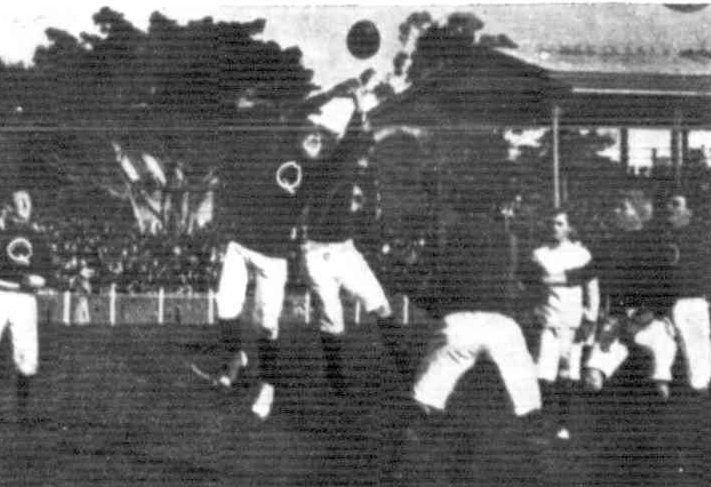
Tasmania defeated Queensland by 20 goals at the Jubilee Australasian Football Carnival in 1908

The history of local Tasmanian football differs considerably from any of the mainland states. Whereas mainland states had a major population centre around which a single dominant league was based, Tasmania's population was more evenly distributed. The consequences of this on Tasmanian football history are three-fold: firstly, a strong intrastate rivalry not noted in any mainland state; secondly, three different top-level football leagues in different regions of the state; and thirdly, the ability for teams representing very small towns to be competitive in the top leagues.

The Tasmanian Football League, based around Hobart, began in 1879. The Northern Tasmanian Football Association, based around Launceston, began in 1886.

Victorian clubs Fitzroy Football Club and Collingwood Football Club visited in 1901 and 1902 respectively winning convincingly against the NTFA.

A third top-level league, although not recognised as such until later, was the North West Football Union, contested by teams on the north-western coast of the state west of Latrobe, which began in 1910.

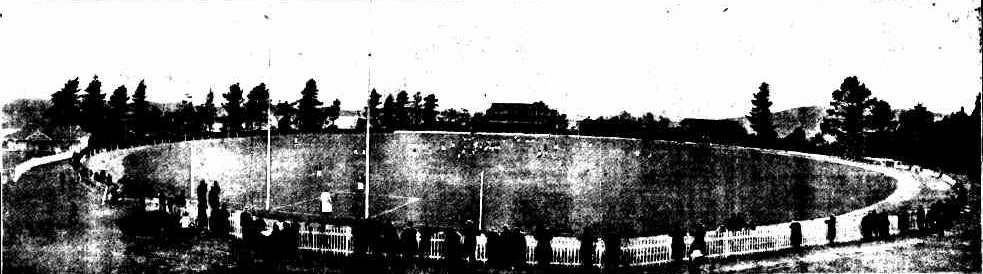
Cananore vs North Hobart at the North Hobart Oval in 1922 drew a crowd of more than 5,000

Victorian club Collingwood FC again visited Launceston in 1923 and played against the NTFA.

The leagues were small in the pre-WWI era, with only three clubs competing in the TFL and NTFA, and four in the NWFU. Intrastate games between representative teams in the leagues were a regular fixture during these years. In the 1920s, the TANFL (as the TFL was now known) and NFTA expanded to four teams apiece, and the NWFU to six.

In 1929, Victorian club Collingwood FC again visited both Launceston and Hobart, playing against the NTFA and SFA respectively.

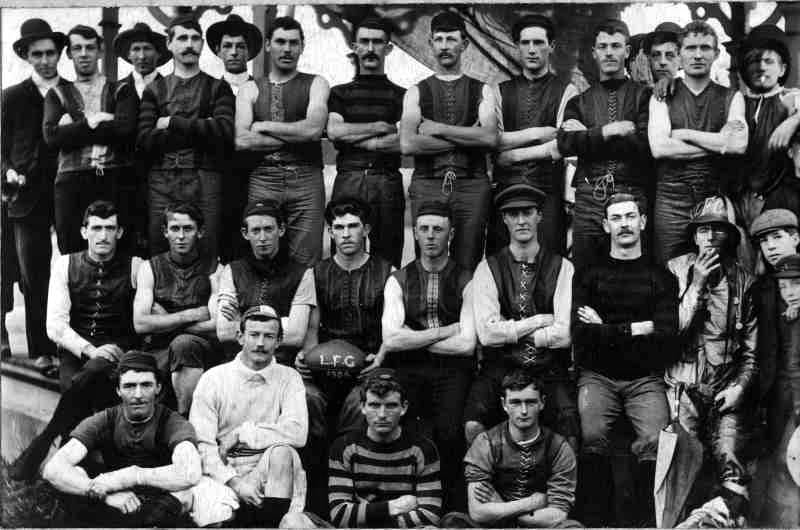
The Latrobe Football Club in 1904

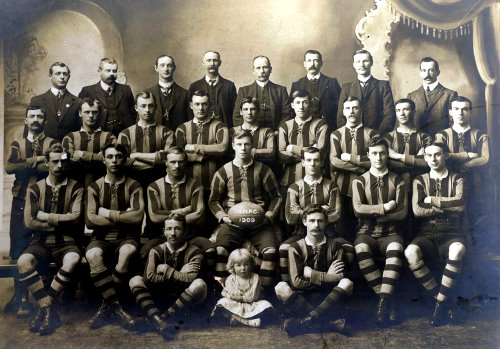
North Hobart Football Club, 1909 premiers.

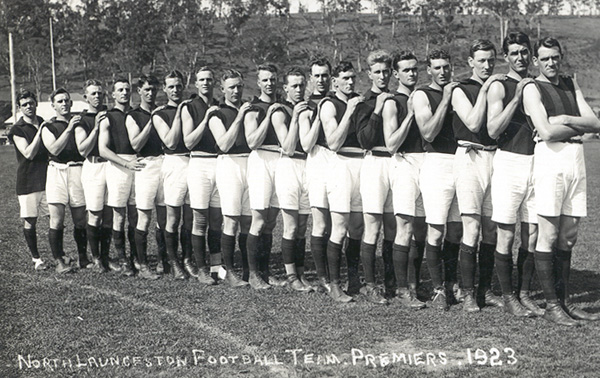
North Launceston Football Club, NTFA premiers in 1923

=== Postwar boom ===
After World War II, all leagues underwent further expansion. The TANFL switched to a district-based selection, and expanded to six clubs. The NFTA also expanded to six teams. The NWFU expanded from six teams to as many as fourteen, with a short-lived incorporation of four Circular Head-based clubs, but eventually contracted back to eight.

The local leagues were extremely popular and attracted large crowds. The TANFL Grand Final between Glenorchy and Clarence at the North Hobart Oval in 1979 attracted a record crowd of 24,968 which, although ostensibly small in comparison to mainland crowds, represented 15% of Hobart's population at the time.

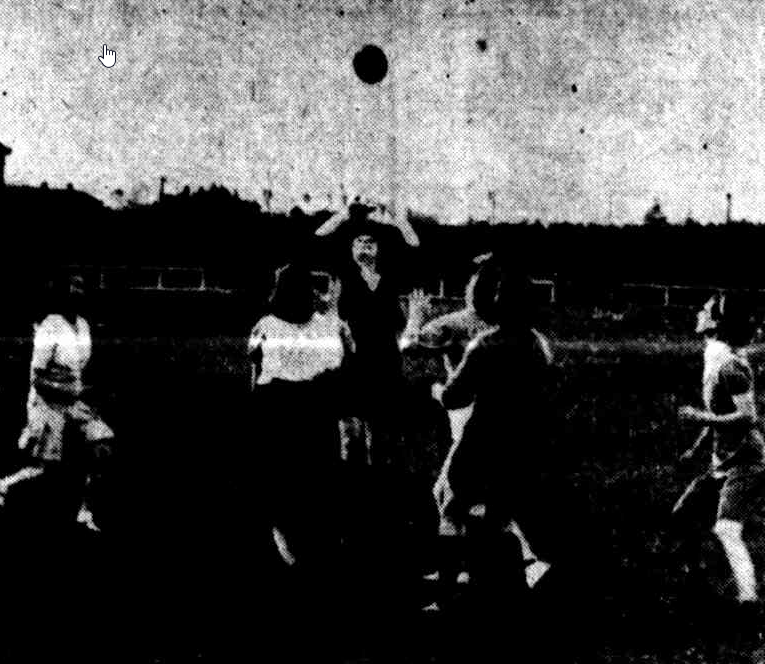
Women's football in Launceston in 1941. Tasmania was one of the first states to hold regular women's competition.

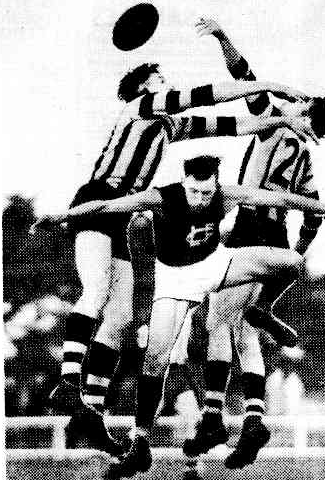
Scottsdale vs Launceston in 1952

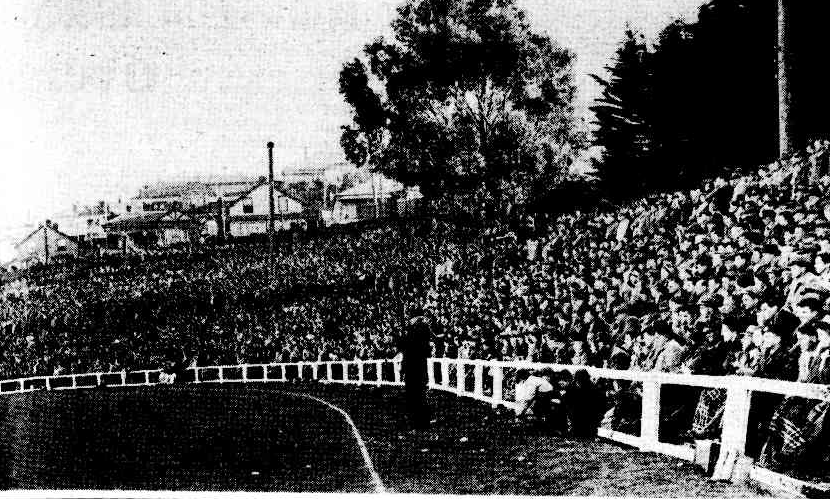
A record crowd of 18,387 packed the North Hobart Ground to see VFL clubs Fitzroy and Melbourne in 1952

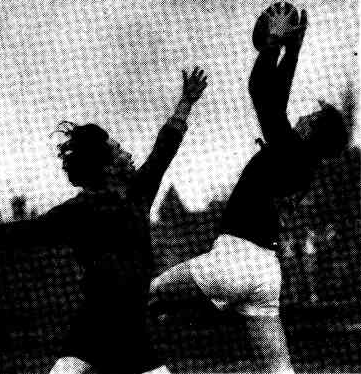
Tasmania's intervarsity powerhouse, UTAS takes on Melbourne University in 1954

=== Reformatted statewide competition: 1978- ===
There were always attempts made to somehow consolidate the major Tasmanian leagues into one statewide competition. The earliest and longest-lasting was the Tasmanian State Premiership, which began (officially) in 1909 as a single Grand Final game between the TANFL and NTFA premiers, for the right to be the State Premiers. The Hobart-based teams initially dominated, winning the first fourteen such contests. In 1950, the NWFU Premier was also invited to contest for the State Premiership. The final State Premiership was played in 1978.

The next attempt at statewide competition was the Winfield Statewide Cup, a seven-week tournament played prior to the 1980 season amongst all twenty teams in the TANFL, NTFA and NWFU, plus one team from the Circular Head Football Association (Smithton, who would join the NWFU that season). The competition was not popular with the northern clubs, who believed the organisation of the league biased towards the Hobart-based league. In response, they refused to play another Winfield Statewide Cup. Instead, the NTFA and NWFU joined to form the Greater Northern Football League, which resembled the old Statewide Premiership format, with the winners of the individual leagues playing off for the GNFL premiership. The GNFL experiment lasted only the 1981 and 1982 seasons.

In 1986 and 1987, a true statewide league was finally realised, when five of the northern clubs left their respective leagues to join the TANFL, renamed the TFL Statewide League: North Launceston, East Launceston and City-South left the NTFA in 1986 (the latter two merging to form South Launceston), and Devonport and Cooee (which was renamed Burnie for the move) left the NWFU in 1987. The two northern leagues merged to form the Northern Tasmanian Football League.

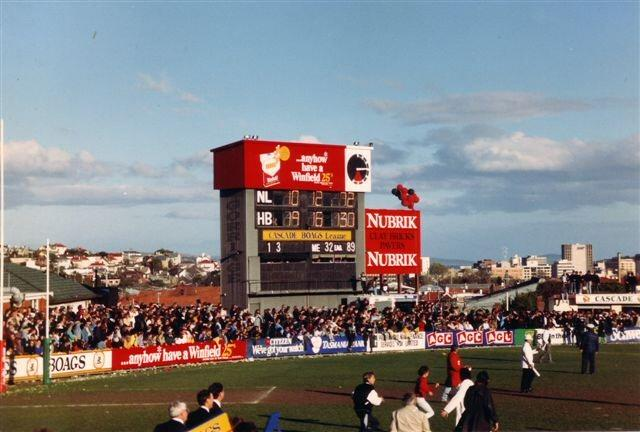
Crowd at a TFL match in Hobart—North Hobart vs North Launceston.

From that point, Tasmanian local football slowly dwindled as teams began to lose money. Clubs began to leave both the NTFL and the Statewide League throughout the 1990s, returning to local or amateur competitions with lower travel costs, or in some cases (such as the TANFL's Sandy Bay Football Club) fold completely. Only six teams remained in the Statewide League by 2000, and after one of the most poorly attended Grand Finals in seventy years, the league folded. The clubs that survived returned to the NTFL and the newly formed Southern Football League.

=== Tasmania and the national AFL competition: 1990– ===
Tasmania's strong State of Origin team was one of the main reasons that the state held off expressing serious interest in joining the AFL competition. The state's historically strong supporter base for Australian rules football, one of the highest participation rates in the country and strong local leagues were also factors. However the team's strong performances against Victoria in the early 1990s prompted Tasmanian officials to open talks with the AFL.

Tasmania was seen as a relocation target for the AFL's struggling clubs and in 1991 the Fitzroy Football Club were contracted for two home games a season at North Hobart Oval however the experiment ended in 1992 when the venture resulted in a large financial loss for the Lions.

After the state side's last representative appearance in 1993, Tasmania stepped up its bids for inclusion in the national competition.

Between 1996 and 1998 a bid was prepared that involved the construction of a 30,000-capacity stadium in the Hobart showgrounds in Glenorchy, at the cost of $34 million. The stadium would have been the team's only home ground, but the appeal was unsuccessful and the stadium was not built.

=== Tasmanian Devils (VFL): 2001-2008 ===
Upon the disbanding of the TFL in 2000, the Tasmanian Devils was formed in 2001 and admitted into the Victorian Football League in its inaugural year. The team played home games in Launceston, Hobart, Ulverstone, Burnie and Devonport during its time in the league. The Devils attracted a strong following in comparison with many other VFL clubs at the time. At the start of the 2006 season the Devils and the Australian Football League's North Melbourne Football Club began a partial alignment, allowing six North Melbourne listed players to play for Tasmania when not selected in the seniors, and arrangement which lasted from 2006 until 2007. This was unpopular among local fans, significantly harming the popularity of the club; and the season proved to be a disappointment on-field, with the Devils finishing ninth and missing the finals. The Devils were wound up at the conclusion of the 2008 season in order to make room for the return of the TFL in 2009.

=== AFL clubs sell home games to Tasmania ===
In 2001, AFL clubs St Kilda and Hawthorn began playing home matches in Launceston at York Park (later known as Aurora Stadium), supported by the Tasmanian government in an attempt to build a local following. St Kilda ended its arrangement after 2006. Hawthorn however increased its presence in the state as part of an agreement with the tourism component of the Tasmanian government, whereby they were contracted to play four games in the state and the Tasmanian Government will be the major sponsor for the club.

A government-backed Tasmanian bid was prepared in response to the AFL admitting new licences for the Gold Coast and Western Sydney for the 2010 and 2011 seasons. While the AFL admitted that the state had put together a stronger business case, it was once again rejected by the league. AFL CEO Andrew Demetriou was quoted to have said to the Tasmanian premier Paul Lennon "Not now, not ever". Hobart's major daily newspaper The Mercury started a petition in response to this news on 16 April 2008. The premier vowed to bypass the AFL CEO and take the appeal directly to the AFL Commission.

On 30 July, the Tasmanian government announced that it had secured a major sponsor, Mars for the bid in a deal worth $4 million over 3 years. It was long doubted by the AFL that the Tasmanian club would secure corporate interest before a proposal is accepted by the AFL and this announcement came as a major shock as it was before a sponsor could be found for either the Gold Coast or Western Sydney Clubs and as AFL clubs Richmond and Western Bulldogs was left without a major sponsor for 2009. In addition to the Gemba financial audit of the bid to meet the AFL criteria, the Tasmania team had secured more than 20,000 potential members, ahead of the Gold Coast and Western Sydney bid in raw numbers.

Since 2001 Hawthorn has successfully cultivated a following in Tasmania playing numerous home games at York Park with its Tasmanian membership base has increased from 1,000 to more than 9,000. Recent studies have valued Hawthorn's economic impact in Tasmania and national brand exposure to total $29.5 million in 2014. Since 2006, Hawthorn has increased its presence in the state as part of an agreement with the tourism component of the Tasmanian government, whereby they are contracted to play four games in the state and the Tasmanian Government will be the major sponsor for the club. This relationship was renewed for a further period for five years (2012–16) in November 2011.

On 31 July 2015, Hawthorn extended their partnership with Tasmania for a further five years. In 2010 the North Melbourne Football Club was contracted to play two games per year in Hobart at Bellerive Oval starting from 2012.

Attendance at these matches, per capita, up to the 2000s and 2010s were the highest in Australia with an average of more than 16,000 per game. Tasmanian Devils VFL home crowds averaged 4,000 a season until the Devils unpopular alignment with AFL club North Melbourne began in 2006. Many viewed it as an AFL attempt at club relocation and as a result average AFL attendances halved after the club began playing home games in Hobart.

=== Tasmanian Football League: 2009– ===
After an eight-year absence, the Tasmanian Football League made a return in 2009. Ten teams were initially represented: from the south, North Hobart, Glenorchy, Hobart, Clarence, Lauderdale; from the north, Launceston, North Launceston, South Launceston; and from the north-western coast, Burnie and Devonport. All clubs except for Lauderdale had at some stage been part of the original Statewide League.

The league's membership underwent changes in 2014. South Launceston left the league and was replaced by the newly established Western Storm, based in western Launceston; North Hobart was disbanded and reincorporated into a new club called Hobart City; and Hobart, which was to have been a joint partner in the Hobart City club before withdrawing from the deal, was replaced by the Tigers FC, based in Kingston.

Despite efforts to maintain a pathway to the AFL, in the 2010s and 2020s it began to produce poorly in the AFL draft and for the first time in history (including 2020 and 2022) Tasmanians missed selection altogether.

== Audience ==
=== Attendance record ===
- 24,968 (1979). TFL Grand Final Glenorchy v Clarence (North Hobart Oval, Hobart)

== Major Australian Rules Events in Tasmania ==
- Australian Football League Premiership Season Hawthorn (Launceston) and Richmond (Hobart) 'home' games
- Southern Football League Grand Final
- Northern Tasmanian Football League Grand Final

== Tasmanian Football Team of the Century ==
In 2004 the Board of Management of AFL Tasmania named a Team of the Century for the state. It had 18 on field and seven interchange players as well as an umpire, coach and assistant coach.

Team of the Century
B:	Verdun Howell	Tassie Johnson	Ivor Warne-Smith
HB:	Barry Lawrence	Laurie Nash	Brent Crosswell
C:	Rodney Eade	Ian Stewart	Arthur Hodgson
HF:	Darrel Baldock (c)	Royce Hart	Daryn Cresswell
F:	Horrie Gorringe	Peter Hudson	Alastair Lynch
Foll:	Percy Jones	John Leedham (vc)	Terry Cashion
Int:	Neil Conlan	Darrin Pritchard	Paul Williams
Int:	Michael Roach	Len Pye	Rex Garwood; Matthew Richardson
Coach:	Roy Cazaly		

- Assistant coach – Robert Shaw
- Umpire – Scott Jeffery

== Representative Side ==
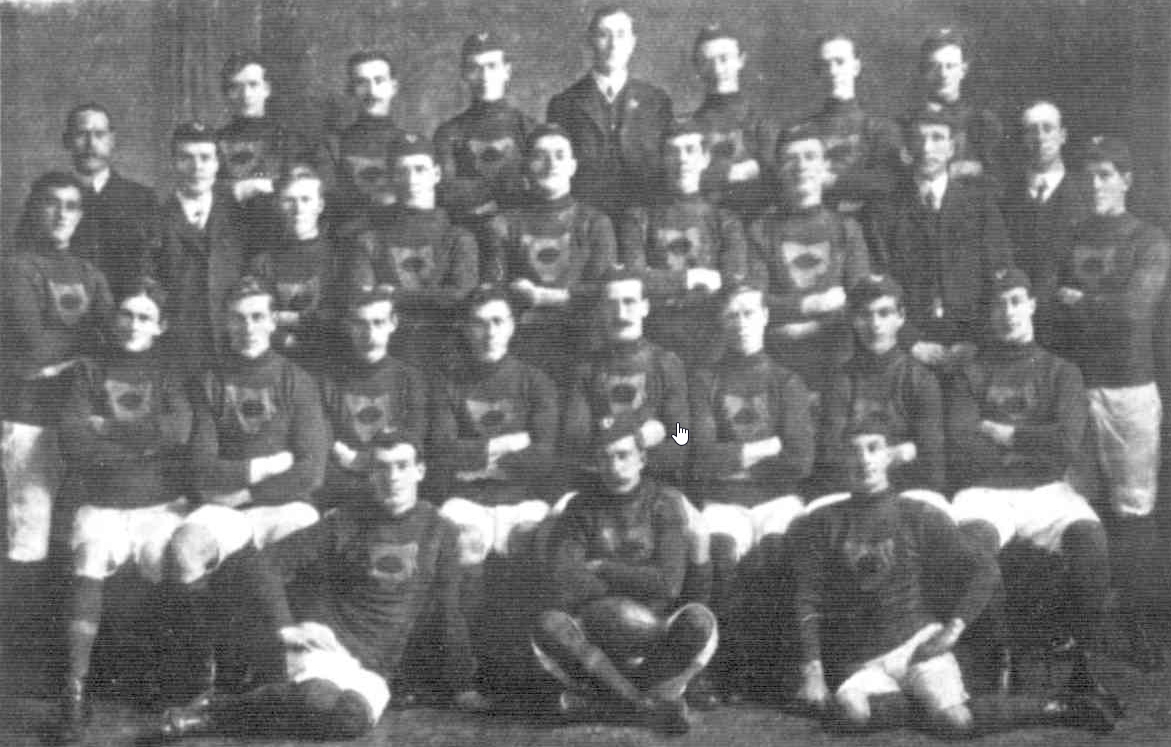
Tasmania representative team 1908

1911 Tasmanian state side from the Adelaide carnival that defeated the Western Australian state team on Adelaide Oval.

The Tasmanian representative team have played State of Origin test matches against all other Australian states. The team's last appearance was at the 1993 State of Origin Championships.

The team wears and all green guernsey with maroon trims and a gold insignia map of Tasmania more recently an embossed T symbol for Tasmania. The same guernsey design was later adopted by the state's AFL club.

Tasmania fields Underage teams at both Under 16 and Under 18 levels in both the AFL Under 19 Championships and 2021 AFL Women's Under 19 Championships.

See Also Interstate matches in Australian rules football

A combined state team usually plays other state competitions around Australia, such as AFL Queensland in 2007, 2009, and 2010.

=== Uniform ===
Tasmania

== Governing body ==
The governing body for Aussie Rules in Tasmania is AFL Tasmania.

In 2009 the three main community football leagues The Northern Tasmanian Football League, Northern Tasmanian Football Association, and the Southern Football League established the Tasmanian Football Council which is a united body that represents community Footballs interests in the state. The council has membership with the Australian Amateur Football Council.

The Tasmanian government set up the Football Tasmania Board in 2019 to provide advice to the government on the state of the game in Tasmania.

== Leagues & Clubs ==
=== State Leagues/clubs (past and present) ===
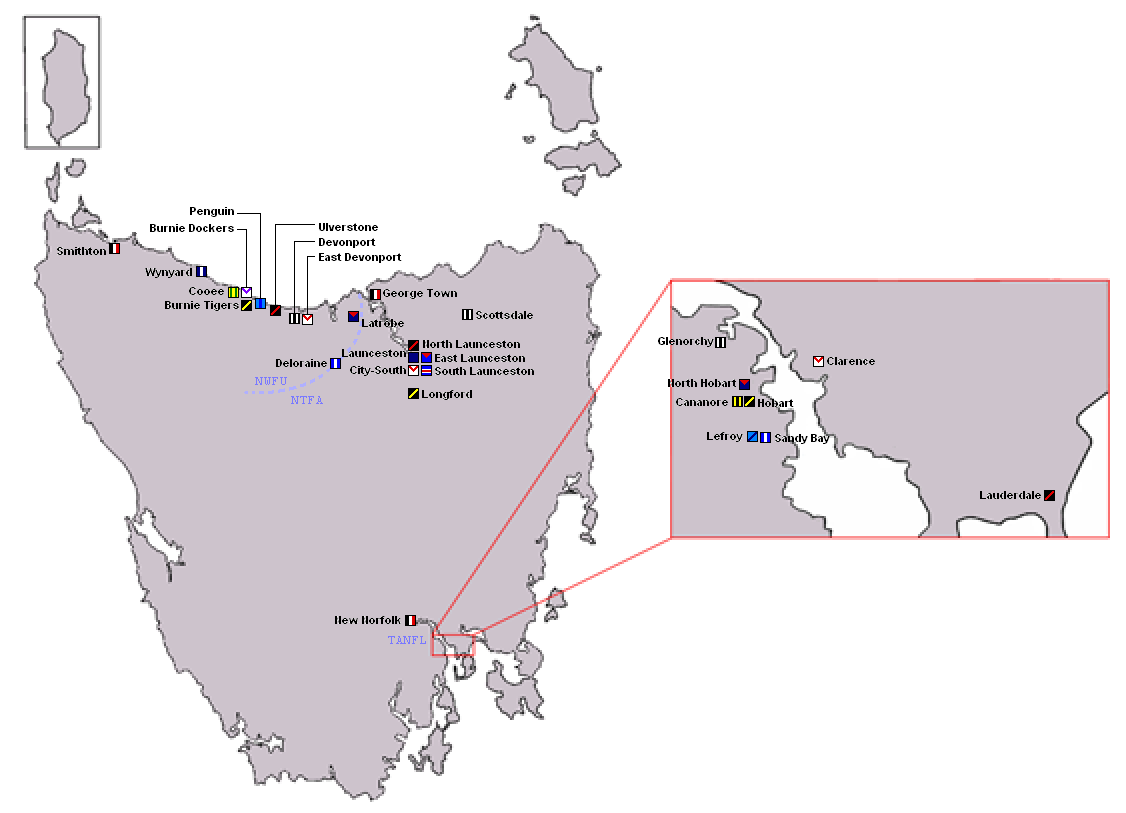

=== Professional clubs ===
- Tasmania Football Club

=== Current clubs ===
- Clarence
- Glenorchy
- Hobart City (rebrand of North Hobart from 2014 to 2017)
- Lauderdale
- Launceston
- North Hobart (rebranded as Hobart City in 2013 and returned 2018)
- North Launceston
- Kingborough Tigers (from 2014)

=== Former clubs ===
==== Tasmanian Football League ====
- Cooee / Burnie Hawks / Burnie Tigers / Burnie Dockers Football Club (exited league in 2018)
- Cananore (pre-WW2)
- Devonport (exited league in 2017)
- Hobart (exited league in 2013)
- Lefroy (pre-WW2)
- New Norfolk
- North Hobart (exited league in 2013)
- Sandy Bay
- East Launceston / South Launceston (exited league in 2013)
- Southern Districts
- Western Storm

==== Northern Tasmanian Football Association ====
- City / City-South / South Launceston
- Deloraine FC (also spent two seasons in the NWFU)
- Cornwall / East Launceston / South Launceston
- George Town FC (also in NTFL)
- Longford
- Scottsdale

==== North West Football Union ====
- Burnie Dockers
- Cooee
- East Devonport
- Latrobe
- Penguin
- Smithton
- Ulverstone
- Wynyard
- Tasmanian Amateur Football League (League had southern and northern divisions with a state amateur premiership)
- Tasmanian State Premiership
- Winfield Statewide Cup
- Tasmanian Devils (Victorian Football League) (2001–2008)

=== Local Leagues ===
- Circular Head Football Association
- Darwin Football Association
- King Island Football Association
- Northern Tasmanian Football Association
- Northern Tasmanian Football League
- North Western Football Association
- Oatlands District Football Association
- Old Scholars Football Association
- Southern Football League

==== Defunct Local Leagues ====
- Deloraine Football Association
- East Tamar Football Association – To the 'Tamar Football Association'
- Esk Football Association
- Esk Deloraine Football Association
- Esperance Football Association
- Fingal District Football Association
- Huon Football Association
- Kingborough Football Association
- Leven Football Association
- Midlands Football Association
- North East Football Union
- North West Christian Amateur Football League
- North West Football Union
- Northern Tasmanian Football Association (original)
- Peninsula Football Association
- South East Districts Football Association
- Southern Districts Football Association
- Tasman Football Association
- Tamar Football Association – To the ‘Northern Tasmanian Football Association’ (new)
- West Tamar Football Association – To the 'Tamar Football Association'
- Western Tasmanian Football Association

=== Junior ===
- Northern Tasmanian Junior Football Association (NTJFA)
- Northern Tasmanian Junior Football League (NTJFL)
- Southern Tasmania Junior Football League

=== Masters ===
- Masters Australian Football Tasmania

=== Umpires ===
- TFUA – Tasmanian Football Umpires Association
- NTFUA – Northern Tasmanian Football Umpires Association
- NWUA – North West Umpires Association

=== Women's ===
==== Tasmanian Women's Football League ====
The Tasmanian Women's Football League (TWFL) was established in 2007 and there are now 8 women's teams in the league statewide. These are:

Burnie Dockers, Clarence Football Club, Evandale, Glenorchy Football Club, Launceston Football Club, Mersey Leven, South East Suns, Tiger City.

Grand Final results

- 2008 – Clarence Roos...
- 2009 – Clarence Roos...
- 2010 – Launceston FC...
- 2011 – Clarence Roos...
- 2012 – Clarence Roos...
- 2013 – Clarence Roos...
- 2014 – Burnie
- 2015 – Clarence Roos
- 2016 – Burnie

==== Tasmanian State League Woman's ====
On Wednesday 19 April 2017, AFL Tasmania announced the formation of the TSLW. A five-team woman's league which will comprise:

- Clarence
- Burnie Dockers
- Glenorchy
- Launceston
- Tigers FC.

They will compete over a 15-round season, commencing on Saturday 29 April 2017.

==== Regional Women's Leagues ====
===== SFLW =====
- Blues
- Claremont Women
- Demons Women
- Port Women
- South East Suns Women

===== NTFAW (2019) =====
- Bridgenorth
- Evandale
- George Town
- Meander Valley
- Old Launcestonians (OLFC)
- Old Scotch
- Scottsdale
- South Launceston

===== TWL North West =====
- Circular Head Giants
- Devonport Magpies
- Latrobe
- Penguin
- Ulverstone

== Principal Venues ==
The following venues meet AFL Standard criteria and have been used to host AFL (National Standard) or AFLW level matches (Regional Standard) are listed by capacity.

Hobart	Launceston	Hobart
Bellerive Oval	York Park	North Hobart Oval
Capacity: 20,000	Capacity: 21,000	Capacity: 18,000
Bellerive Oval (Hobart) during an AFL match	York Park (Launceston) during an AFL match	North Hobart Oval
Hobart	Devonport	Burnie
KGV Oval	Devonport Oval	West Park Oval
Capacity: 18,000	Capacity: 14,000	Capacity: 12,000
KGV Oval	Devonport Oval	West Park Oval
Ulverstone	Latrobe	Hobart
Ulverstone Recreation Ground	Latrobe Recreation Ground	Kingston Twin Ovals
Capacity: 9,000	Capacity: 9,000	Capacity: 7,000
Penguin
Dial Regional Sports Complex
Capacity: 3,000

== Players ==
=== Participation ===
According to Ausplay there are 13,927 adult players with a participation rate of 2.5% per capita about a quarter of which are female down from 5% per capita in 2007.

Adult players
2007	2016	2019	2022/23	2023/24
4,500	15,732	14,465	14,528	13,927

Tasmania has supplied over 300 players to the elite level.

=== AFL Recruitment and Zones ===
In the absence of a Tasmanian AFL club, the Australian Football League granted its North Melbourne Football Club full access to Tasmania via its academy Recruitment Zone since 2016. This also meant that when North Melbourne entered the AFLW in 2019, it was given access to the Tasmanian talent from across the league so as to act as Tasmania's team in the competition. Other clubs may access Tasmanians that are overlooked or via the rookie draft.

=== Past greats ===
Tasmania has three Australian Football Hall of Fame legends: St Kilda and Latrobe premiership captain and three-time Wander Medallist Darrel Baldock, dual Leitch Medallist and twelve-time league goalkicking champion Peter Hudson and three-time Brownlow Medallist Ian Stewart.

Other players from Tasmania include Hall of Fame inductees Royce Hart, Vic Belcher, Horrie Gorringe, Matthew Richardson, Laurie Nash.

AFL Tasmania also maintains its own Tasmanian Football Hall of Fame with hundreds of footballers, many of whom also played in the AFL.

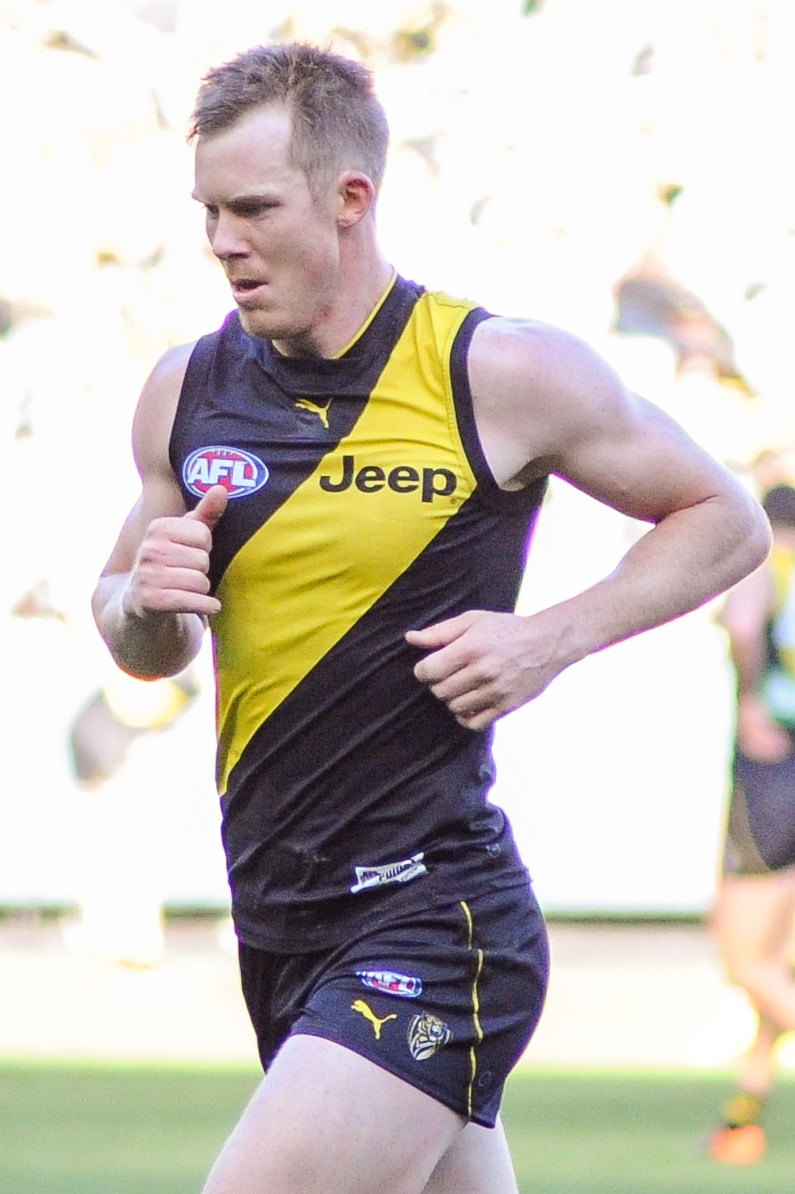
Jack Riewoldt is from Hobart

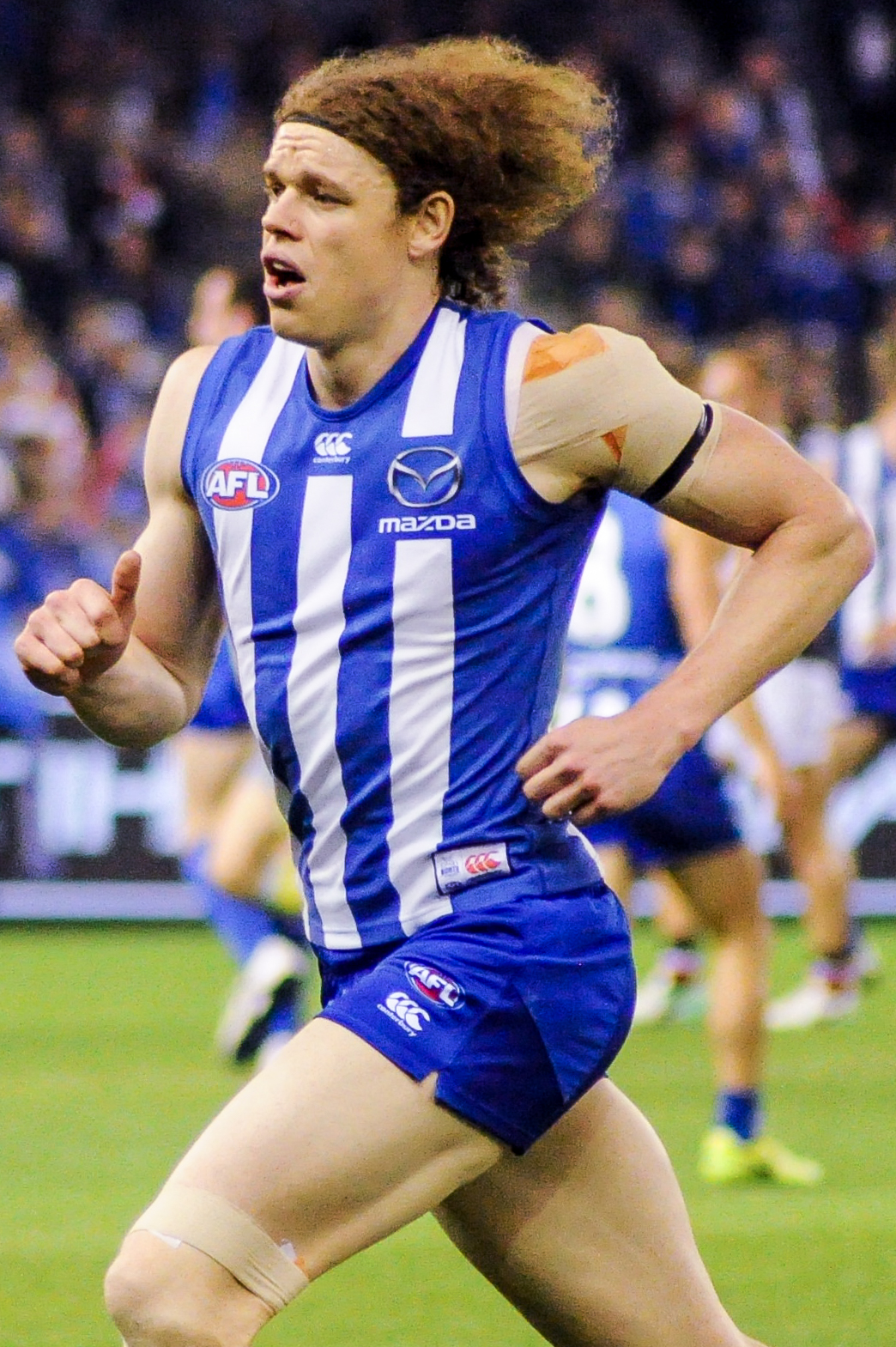
Ben Brown is from Devonport

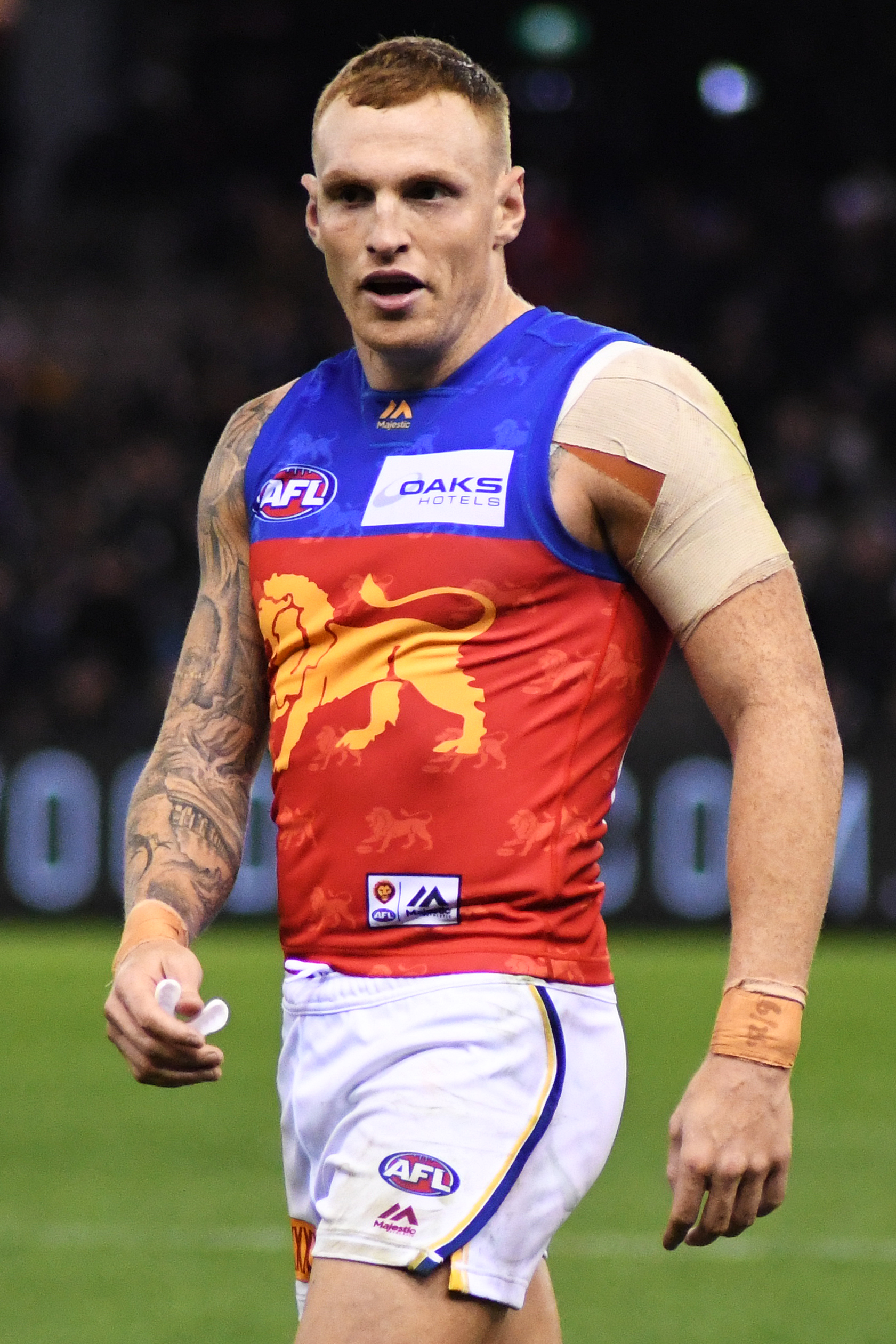
Mitch Robinson is from Hobart

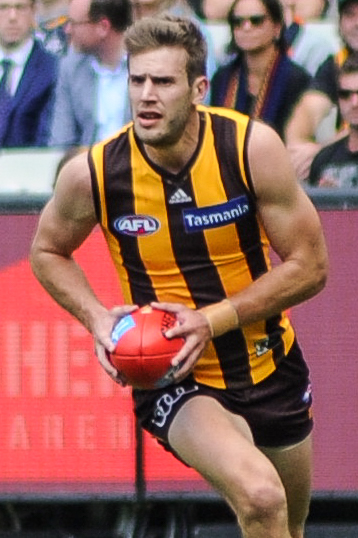
Grant Birchall is from Devonport

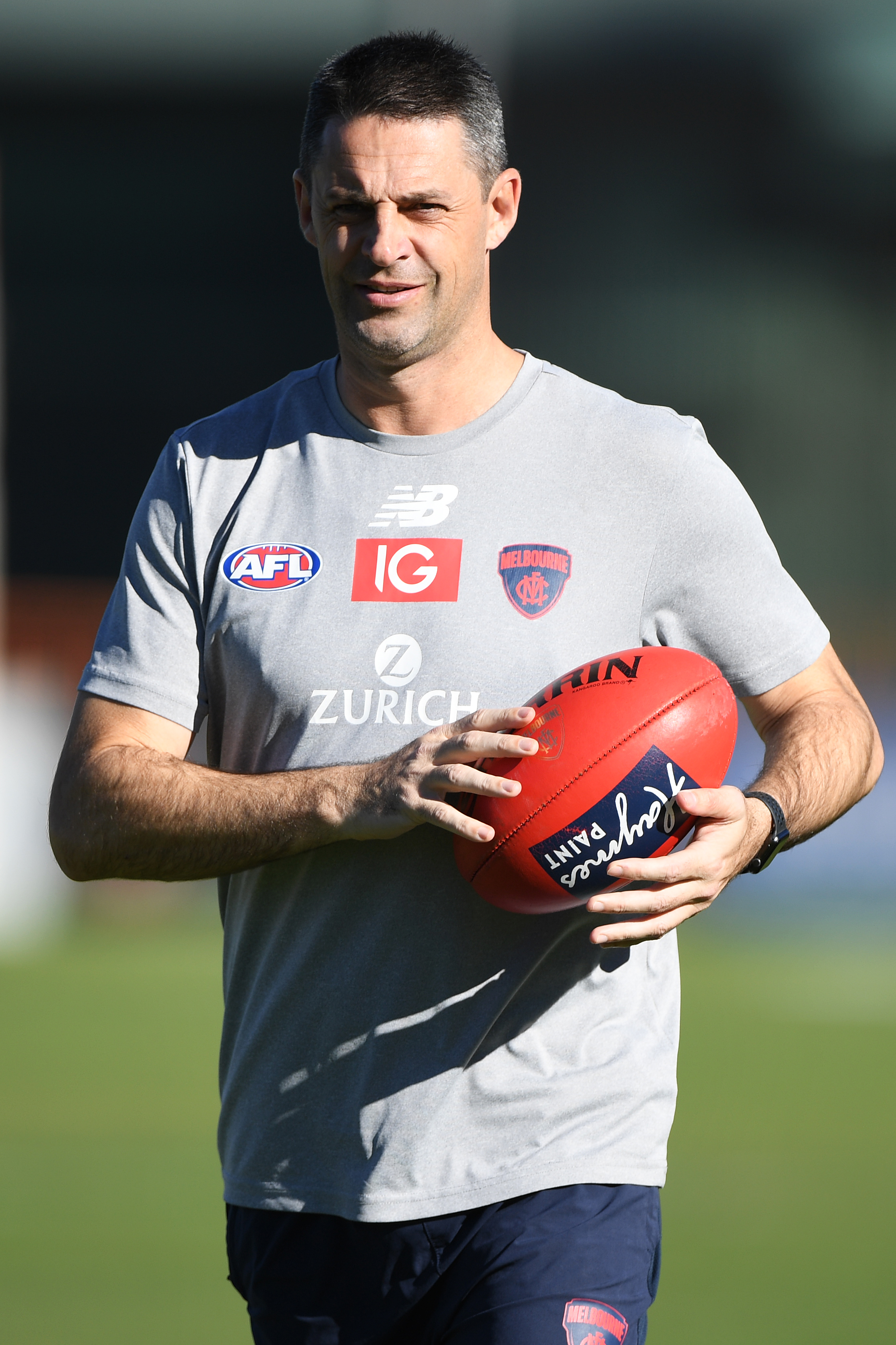
Jade Rawlings is from Devonport

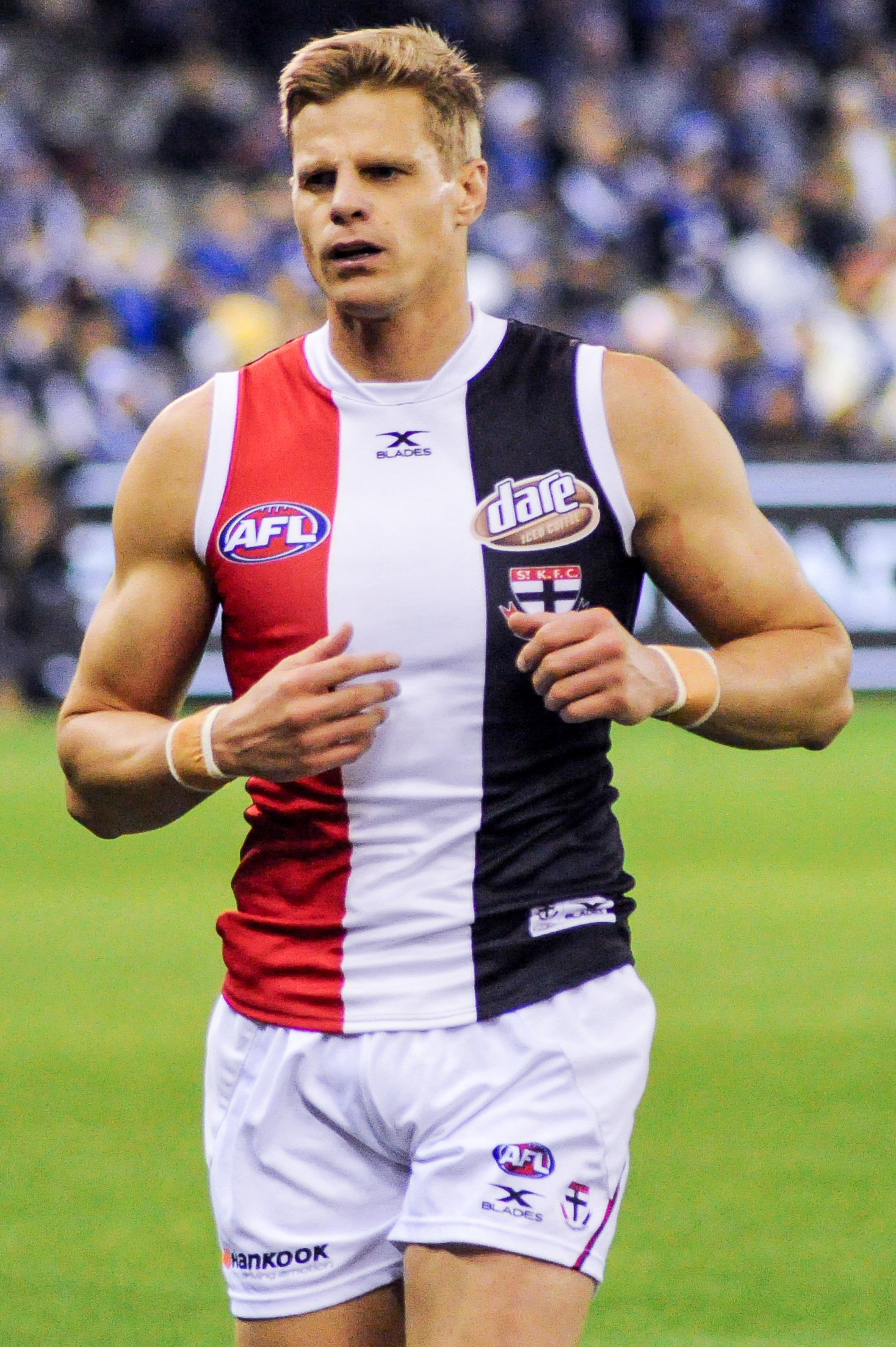
Nick Riewoldt is from Hobart

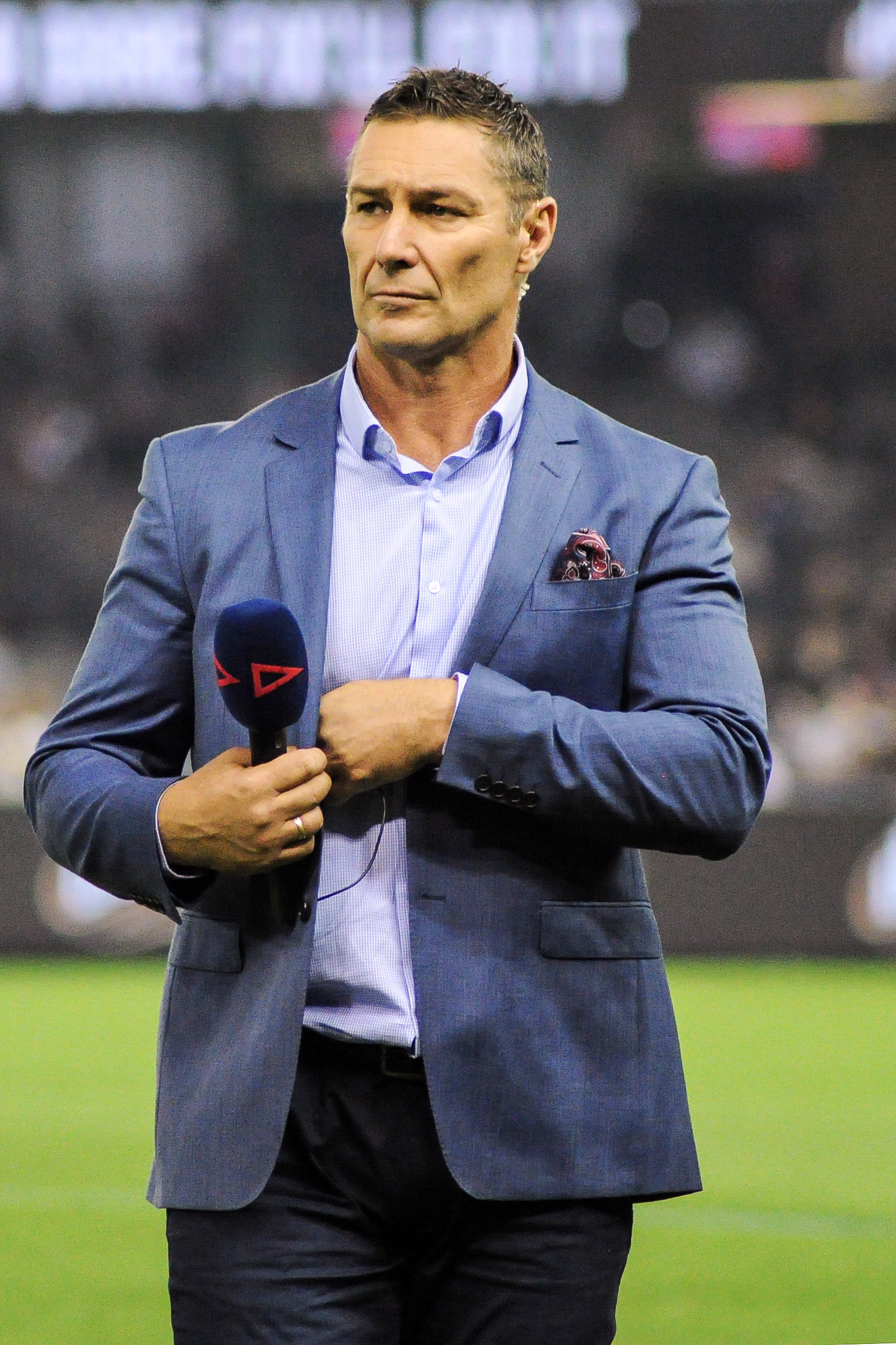
Alastair Lynch is from Burnie

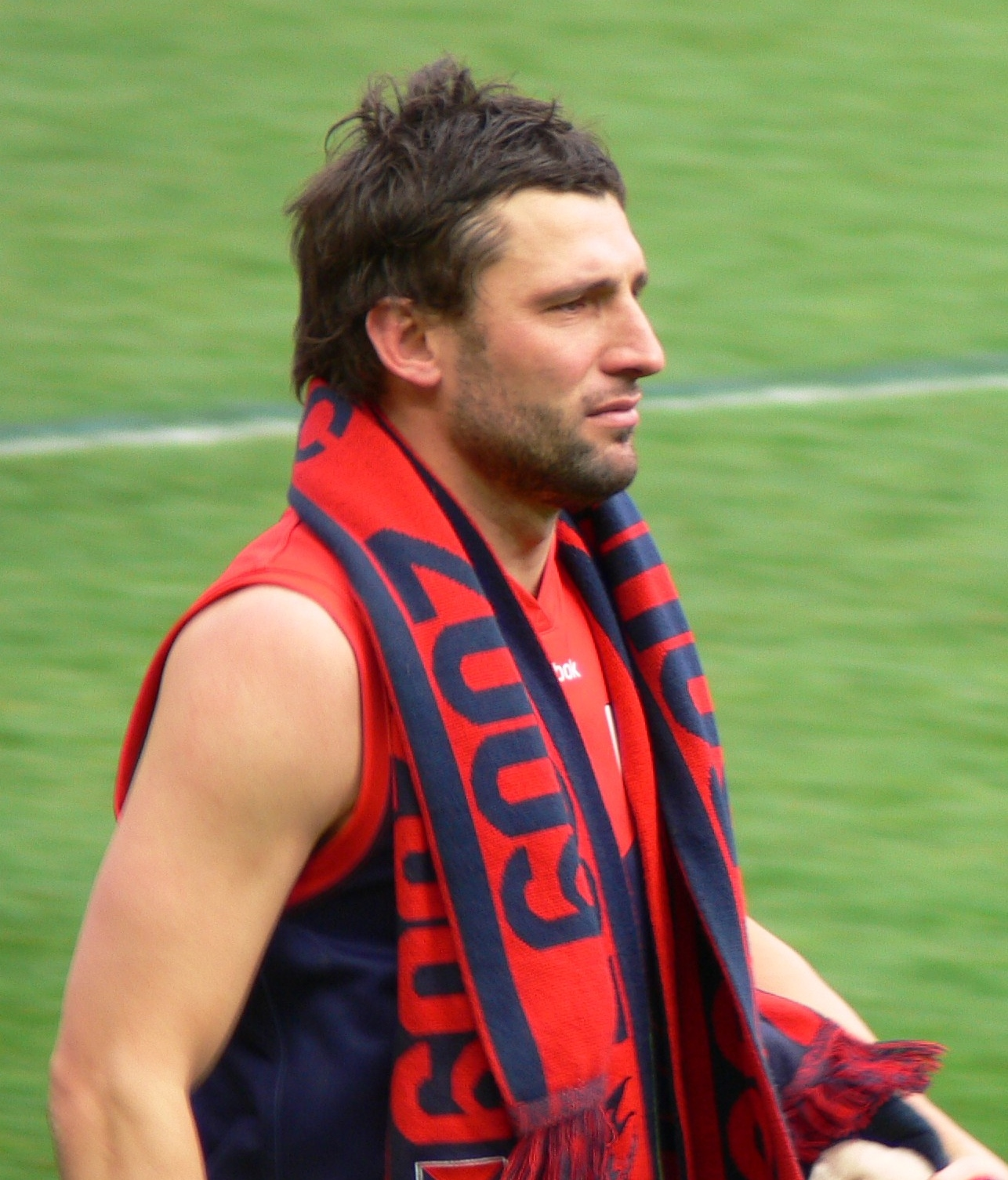
Russell Robertson is from Penguin

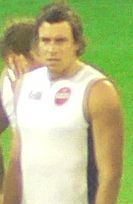
Matthew Richardson is from Devonport

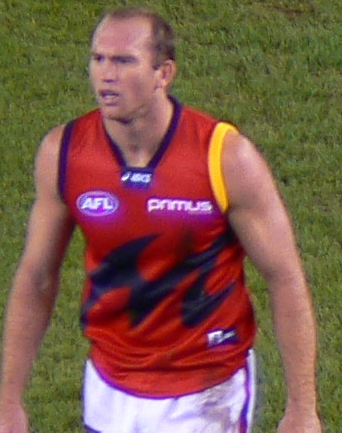
David Neitz is from Ulverstone

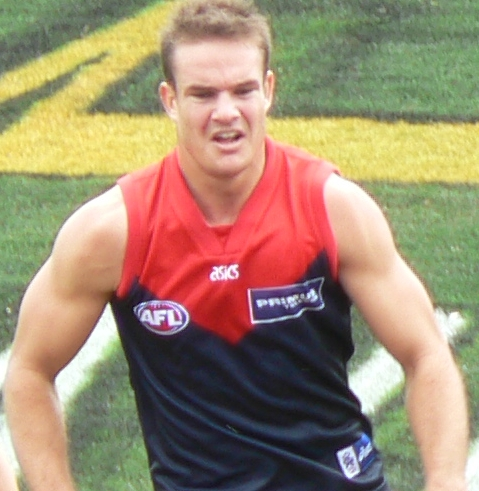
Brad Green is from George Town

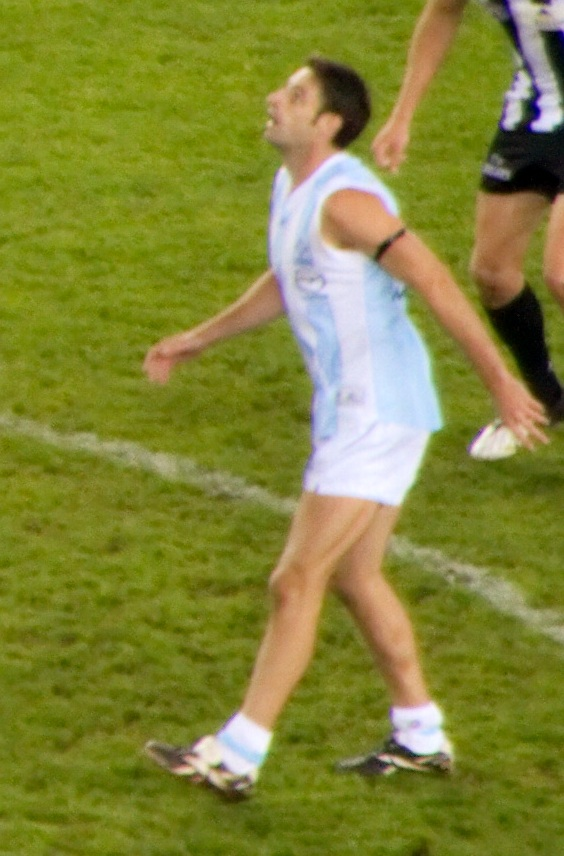
Brady Rawlings is from Devonport

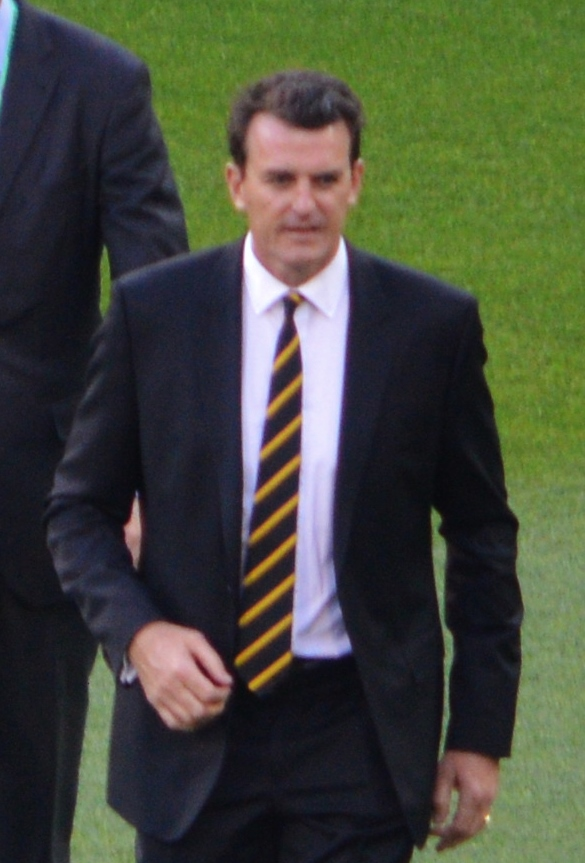
Brendon Gale is from Burnie

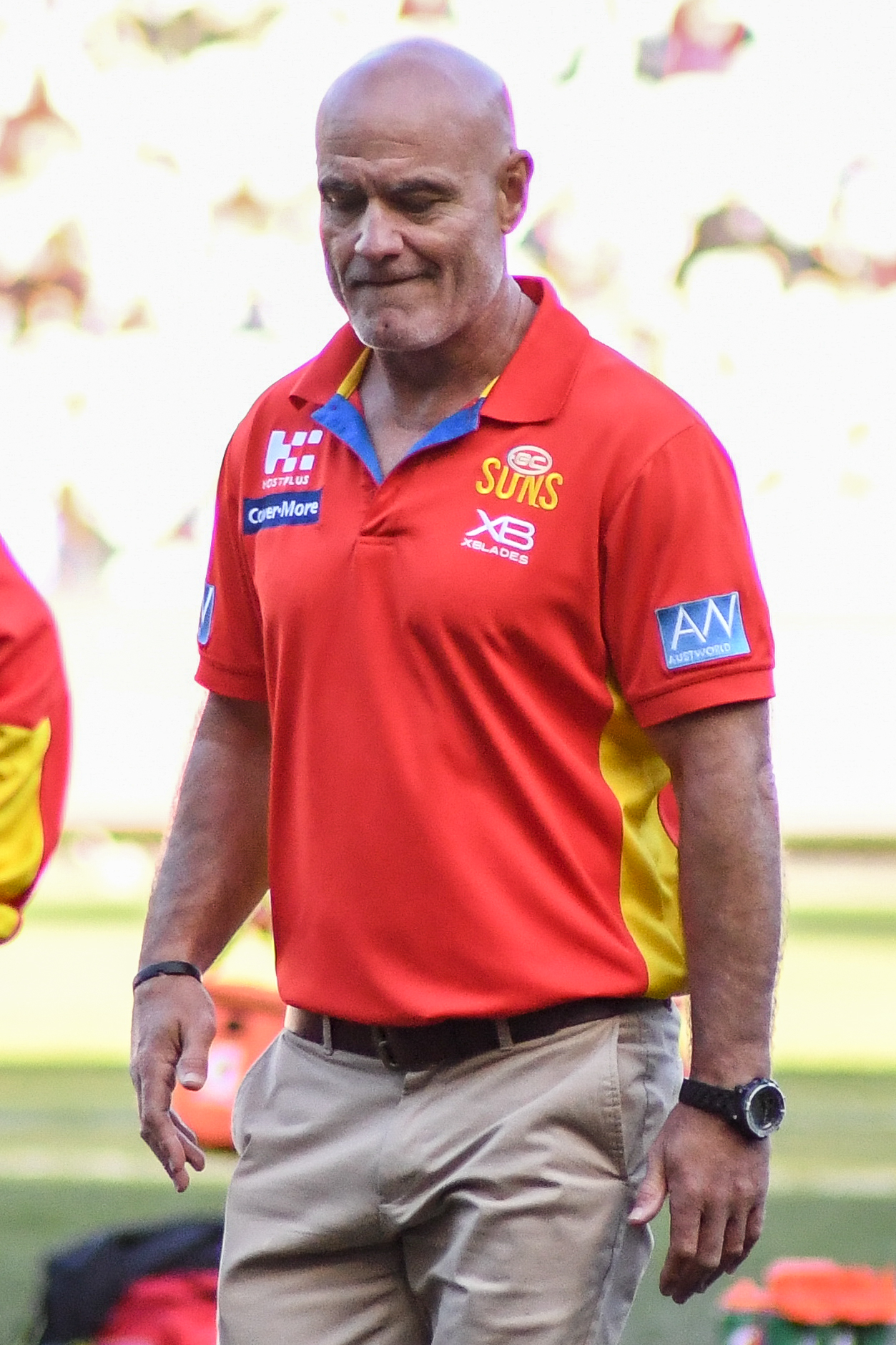
Andy Lovell is from Hobart

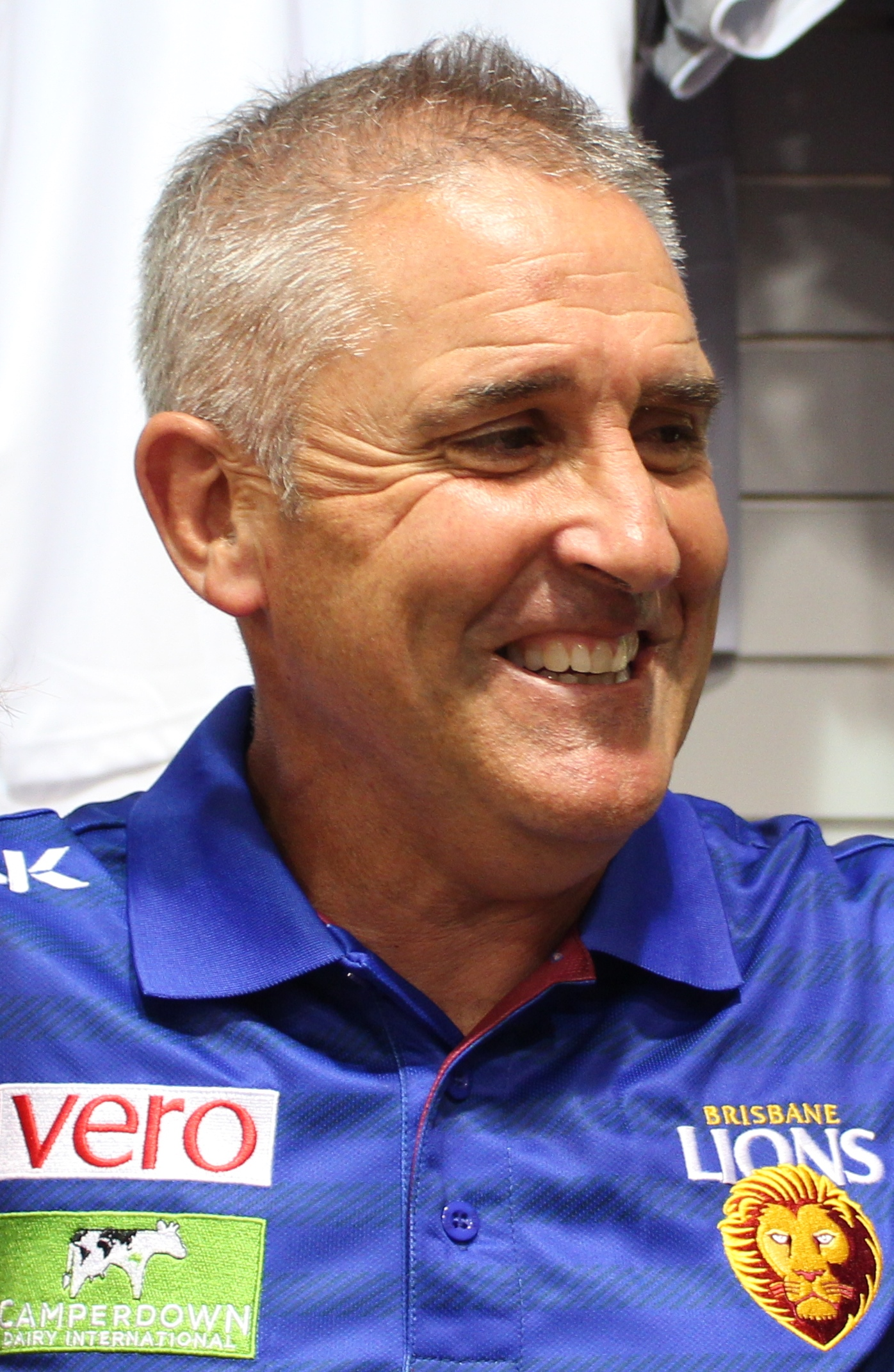
Chris Fagan is from Queenstown

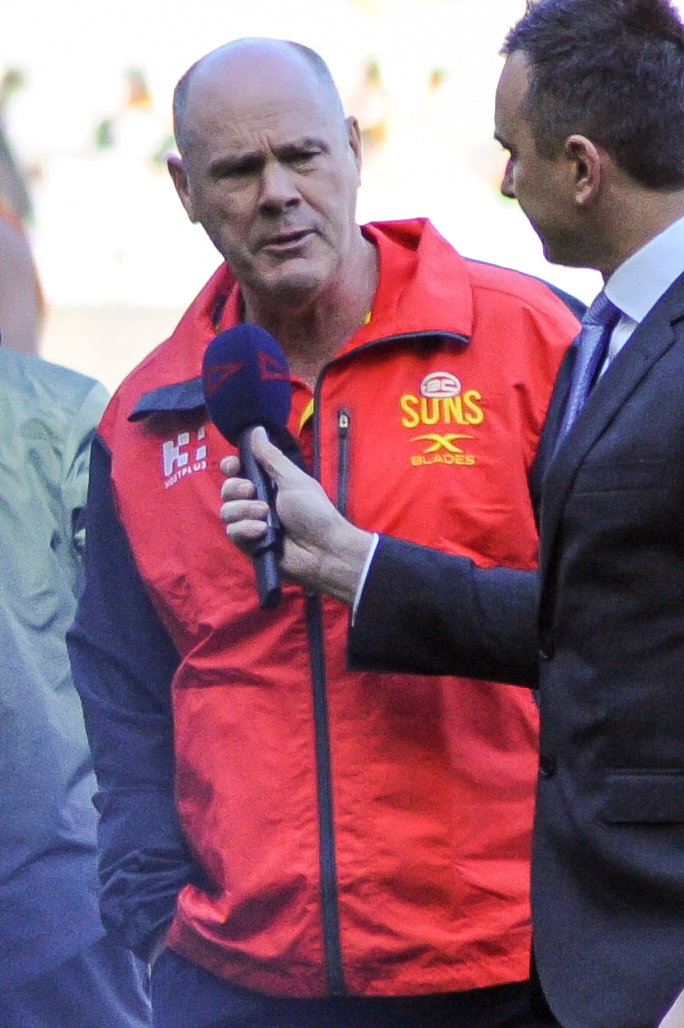
Rodney Eade is from Hobart

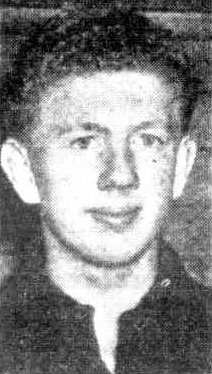
Verdun Howell is from Launceston

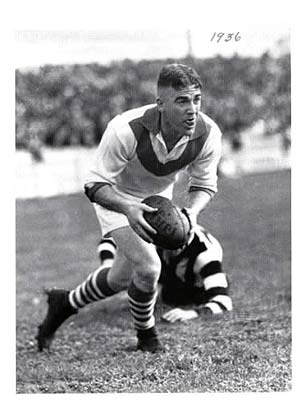
Laurie Nash lived in Launceston

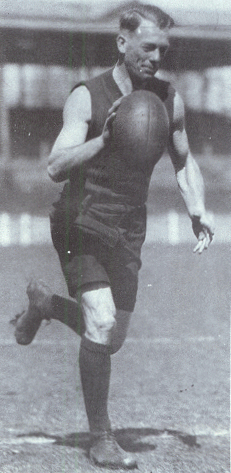
Ivor Warne-Smith lived in Latrobe

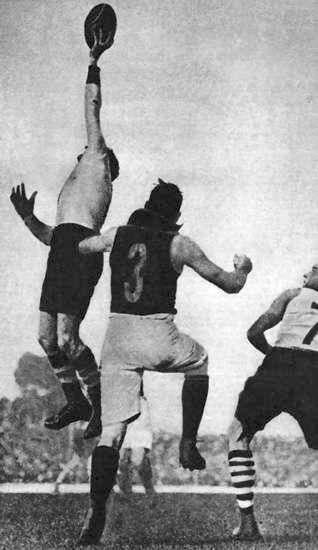
Roy Cazaly lived in Launceston

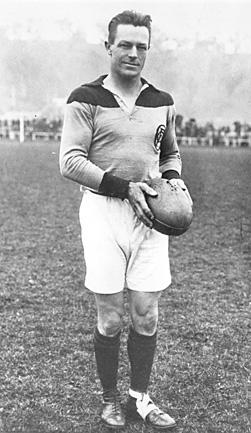
Horrie Gorringe was from Sanford

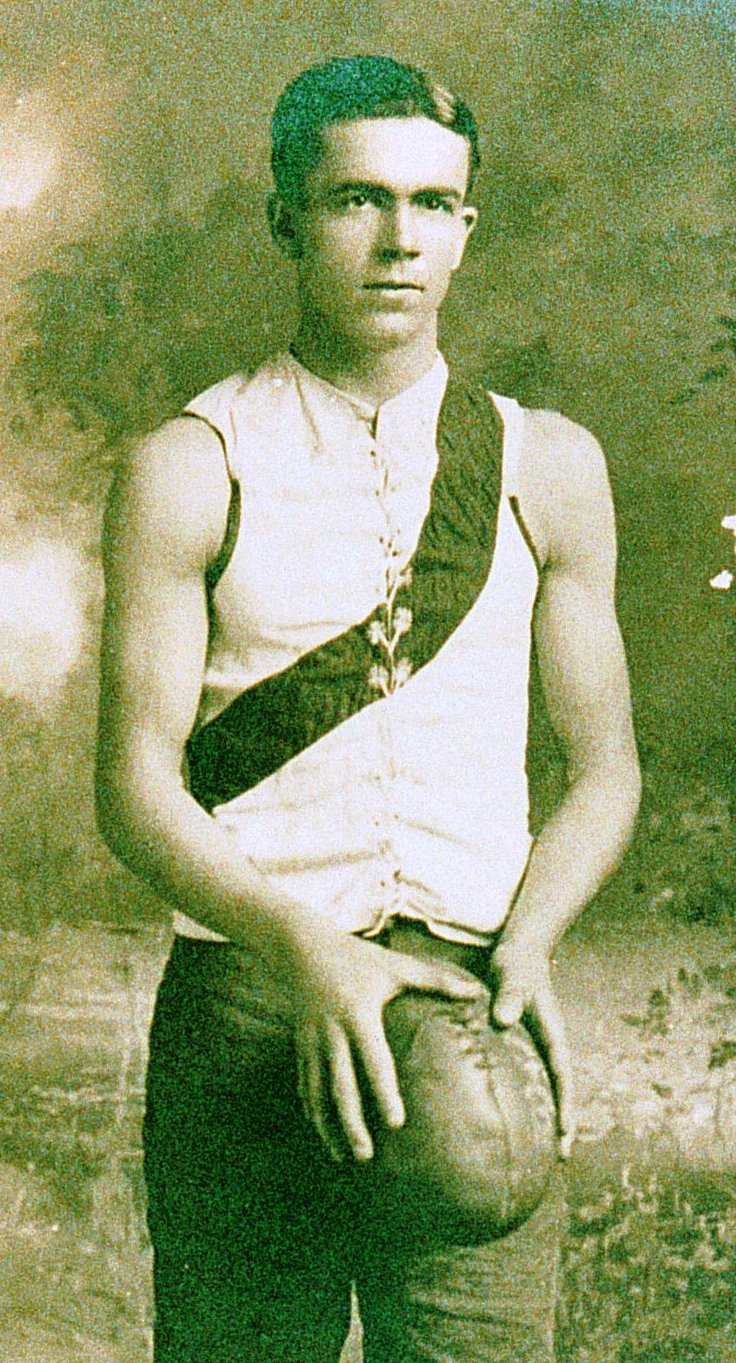
Vic Belcher was from Launceston

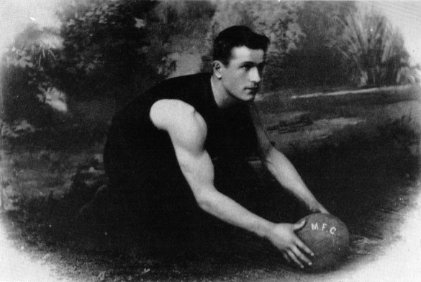
Fred McGinis was from Hobart
