= Proposed relocation of the North Melbourne Football Club =

Relocating the North Melbourne Football Club has been a priority for the Australian Football League (AFL) since the 1980s especially during times of financial and on-field difficulty, to secure the club's future.

The league has had an agenda to relocate its Melbourne-based clubs since the presidency of Allen Aylett in the early 1980s as part of its the expansion from a Victorian league to a national league. The push to merge or relocate Victorian clubs continued strongly under Ross Oakley from 1986. Since rebranding to the AFL, a legacy of 10 of its 16 AFL clubs based in Victoria was seen by the league as unsustainable over the longer term. The AFL has consistently pushed for its Melbourne based clubs to relocate interstate, offering significant incentives. North Melbourne has been a regular target of these offers due to financial and on-field pressures throughout the latter 20th and 21st century, and as such has been involved in interstate relocation or merger proposals similar to that of the Sydney Swans in 1982 or the Brisbane Lions in 1996.

For several proposals, most notably an AFL-supported relocation to the Gold Coast, Queensland in 2007, the issue has been put to a club member vote. Following the Kangaroos' rejection of the Gold Coast relocation offer – resulting in the admission of the Gold Coast Suns to the competition in 2011 – there was a push from the AFL for the Kangaroos to relocate to Tasmania in preference to awarding a license to a Tasmanian team, which ended when Tasmania received the 19th AFL license in 2023.

The club has rallied and strongly resisted all proposed relocation attempts.

== Canberra (1984-2009) ==
The idea of a national competition started in Canberra as early as the early 1980s. Australian rules had become the most popular code in Canberra by the late 1970s and the territory made its first bid for a VFL license in 1981. After its rejected bids (which coincided with the relocation of South Melbourne to Sydney) the territory began resorting to relocate a Melbourne based club and commenced discussions with North Melbourne. The prospect of North Melbourne playing home games in Canberra was first raised publicly as early as 1984, with the club expressing an interest in playing a role in developing a national competition. By 1990 it was suggested that the ACTAFL was in ongoing discussions with the club to relocate it to Canberra. While the ACTAFL said that it would welcome the club, North Melbourne strongly denied the rumours. The proposal was raised by the ACTAFL again in 1992 and in 1993, however strong on-field performance of the Kangaroos made it a more difficult target for the ACTAFL. In 1999 the club dropped the name North Melbourne in its branding to become The Kangaroos in an effort to appeal to interstate markets (at the time, Sydney and Canberra). The move was to prove lucrative with the AFL and North Melbourne gaining ACT government backing to play home games at Canberra's Manuka Oval from 2002. The government backed the deal in the hope that the club would eventually commit long term to the region and for a time, the team playing in the territory were promoted locally as the "Canberra Kangaroos". North Melbourne's matches against the Swans in Canberra in 2004 and 2006 became the territory's record crowds for the sport peaking at 14,922 in 2006. However in 2006 the Kangaroos, encouraged by the AFL, received a more lucrative offer to move its interstate home games to the Gold Coast. The ACT Government set a deadline for the club to choose between Canberra and the Gold Coast, to which North Melbourne executive Geoff Walsh announced that it would be turning its back on the ACT and signed a three-year deal to play ten home games at Carrara Stadium between 2007 and 2009 at AUD$400,000 per game. After the AFL's AUD$100 million push to relocate the club to the Gold Coast failed, North Melbourne in 2009 attempted to re-negotiate with the ACT government, however the club was told that it had suffered irrepairable reputation damage in Canberra.

== Brisbane (1986) ==
In 1986, a consortium bidding for a VFL license for Queensland tried to woo North Melbourne to relocate north to Brisbane however North Melbourne president Bob Ansett did not publicly respond to the proposal.

== Sydney (1999-2002) ==
In 1999 the AFL, buoyed by the success of the relocated Swans 1996 Grand Final appearance, sought to make North Melbourne Sydney's second team. The club had gained some market exposure by defeating the Swans in their first re-location Grand Final appearance. The AFL helped newly branded "The Kangaroos" secure an agreement to play some home games at the Sydney Cricket Ground in 1999 until 2002. The Sydney Swans, having worked for decades to build a following in the city, were fiercely against the move and set out to assert the club's dominance over the market and the SCG. Ultimately the venture was unsuccessful as The Kangaroos failed to build a following in Sydney. After several games a season the club never managed to draw crowds of over 15,000 at the SCG and the club turned its attention to increased interest from Canberra.

== Gold Coast (2006-2007) ==
In 2006 the Kangaroos agreed to play 3 home games at Carrara Stadium in the Gold Coast throughout 2007, which fuelled speculation of a possible relocation there by 2010.

The Kangaroos had full AFL backing for their Gold Coast experiment, and the team had filmed a television commercial shown in South East Queensland promoting their team and the game. The AFL had stated that it wanted one game a week played in Queensland by 2015.

On 2 December 2007, media reports from The Age stipulated that the AFL had garnered support from 75% of the Kangaroos Board to move the club to the Gold Coast. With the club having a unique shareholder 'system' which gives members little say in the matter, the fact that the majority of the board saw the future of the club on the Gold Coast did not bode well for opponents of a move.

The Kangaroos answered their critics with a 24-point win in their first "home" game at Carrara in Round 4 against the Lions. Hamish McIntosh picked up 20 possessions while Leigh Brown kicked three goals. Jess Sinclair, Glenn Archer and Daniel Wells were the Kangaroos best. In Round 8, North achieved its highest ever home game attendance at Cararra, 11,647 against Carlton. However this was still lower than what other non-Queensland clubs had achieved playing home matches on the Gold Coast.

During October, supporters started to mobilise in opposition to the proposed relocation. A group, led by David Wheaton, called We Are North Melbourne emerged and launched a public campaign, calling for the club's shareholder structure to be wound-up and for ordinary members to be given the final say on the relocation issue. The group also raised questions about the viability of the AFL's relocation offer which grabbed national media attention.

Another group, created by Shane Lidgerwood, staged a "Roosistence" rock concert at the Prince of Wales Hotel in St. Kilda, headed by You Am I frontman and North Melbourne supporter Tim Rogers, to raise funds for the club to remain in Melbourne.

On 6 December, the AFL announced to the Kangaroos that it had rejected their request for "12 months' grace" to consider the Gold Coast relocation. That afternoon, the club's board voted to reject the AFL's proposal. It also unanimously endorsed James Brayshaw as the new chairman. At a club information meeting at Dallas Brooks Hall in the evening, Brayshaw announced the board's decision to 2,500 club members, but warned them that the club now faced a tough fight to secure its financial future.

On 7 December they announced an intention to return to the name North Melbourne (instead of being known only as "Kangaroos"), underlining their desire to stay based in Melbourne.

The club announced a major upgrade to their Arden Street facilities in an attempt to remain competitive off the field.

Shortly after, Rick Aylett quit as CEO of the club, citing personal reasons and an inability to work with a board which was split on the issue of relocation to the Gold Coast. Following the announcement, James Brayshaw named a new board, committed to remaining in Melbourne.

On 8 December news of a new major sponsorship deal broke, suggesting Vodafone will put up to A$2 million into the club over the next 2 years for primary naming rights.

== Ballarat (2010-2014) ==
In 2010, the AFL assisted the club to set up a base in the city of Ballarat, Victoria west of Melbourne, with a deal to play home games there. The AFL offered to increase the Kangaroos Eureka Stadium matches to four as a potential future base in a growing city under 100 kilometres from the Kangaroos' spiritual home. The move was heralded by many as a good strategic choice. In 2012, the club began to recruit local Ballarat employees and formed a playing alignment with the North Ballarat Football Club. In 2012, redevelopment of Eureka Stadium became a major local issue for the 2014 Victorian state election creating uncertainty over the AFL's future in the market. With the Western Bulldogs offering to set up in Ballarat regardless of the election result and stadium redevelopment, the Ballarat community began to question North Melbourne's commitment, particularly in light of its deal to move some of its home games to Tasmania.

Just a few years after its foray into Ballarat, the Western Bulldogs muscled in with a better long-term deal for the city including a package of premiership season home games and North ended its bid to establish a base there. North failed to attract more than 8,000 to Eureka stadium, ironically this figure was achieved in a 2012 pre-season match against the Western Bulldogs when the Bulldogs had announced its intention to challenge North for the Ballarat market.

== Tasmania (2006-2023) ==
From 2006 to 2023, there were discussions around the possibility of an AFL club relocating to Tasmania.

Tasmania had been bidding for its own team since 1992, however the AFL had rejected their bids and offered the relocation of a struggling team from Melbourne as an alternative. At the start of the 2006 season, the Devils and the Australian Football League's North Melbourne Football Club began a partial alignment, allowing North Melbourne listed players to play for Tasmania when not selected in the seniors, an arrangement which lasted from 2006 until 2007. This was unpopular among local fans, harming the popularity of the club, and the season proved to be a disappointment on-field, with the Devils finishing ninth and missing the finals, ultimately going into recess at the end of 2008.

Since 2012, the club began playing regular premiership fixtures in Tasmania. North's popularity at Bellerive peaked in the 2015 AFL season and 2016 AFL season when it drew high attendances of between 16,000 and 18,000 to a few of its matches due primarily to its on field improvement. However, following the COVID-19 pandemic and Tasmania's (ultimately successful) 2021 AFL bid, the club's home attendances dropped as low as 5,000 as its on-field performance continued to slide.

In 2016, the AFL provided the club with first access to Tasmanian talent through the creation of the North Melbourne Tasmanian Academy and the AFL draft, while the North Melbourne-Tasmania Kangaroos, a Tasmanian-aligned AFLW club, was admitted to the competition.

In 2017, the North Melbourne women's team's name and guernsey for home games was rebranded the "Tassie Kangaroos", however the move widespread criticism from cynical Tasmanian fans that the club was more fly-in fly-out as opposed to being committed to Tasmania long-term.

In 2019, due to the continuing decline of the Tasmanian player base, the club was criticised for failing to foster local talent at the grassroots.

In 2020, Caroline Wilson stated that "within the AFL there’s a view that Tasmania should not be off the table despite the fact that it seems like an indulgence at the moment, and that North Melbourne should go to Tasmania".

In April 2020, former North Melbourne CEO Ron Joseph voiced his opposition to the idea of North Melbourne relocating to Tasmania, by saying he would "fight like buggery" to stay at Arden Street if the league ever again tried to relocate the club. Further, Joseph was concerned that "North Melbourne has been identified as the club that they’d like to head AFL football in Tasmania...They haven’t got an AFL competition until they have a Tasmanian team. It’s a real issue for the AFL".

In 2021, talks around the formation of a Tasmanian-based AFL club began heating up. It was originally reported that the state’s best chance for an AFL license would come through relocating an existing club rather than a 19th team, with the focus of this being on North Melbourne.

The club was further aligned with Tasmania with the appointment of Tasmanians in president Ben Buckley (2016) and senior coach David Noble (2021), both having represented the state. In 2021, club CEO Ben Amarfio gave in-principle support for a new Tasmanian licence (along with Hawthorn's Jeff Kennett) despite both clubs having a vested interest given the sale of their home games.

While Kennett remained open to the prospect of future relocation, Amarfio remained adamant that the club would not relocate to Tasmania, stating: "Our footy club has been in North Melbourne for over 150 years. We are invested in staying at Arden Street and looking forward to being an active participant with the Victorian government and the City of Melbourne in the exciting development going on in this precinct." Club president Ben Buckley, responding to pressure from AFL CEO Gillon McLachlan, reiterated this stance in 2022.

On 3 May 2023, the AFL announced that Tasmania would receive the 19th licence to enter the AFL and AFLW in 2028, therefore ending any prospect of a club relocation. Further, with the admission of a Tasmanian team to the AFLW, the raison d'etre for the alignment between North Melbourne and Tasmania will cease to exist, and the alignment will be dissolved.

With the 19th license being awarded to a Tasmanian team, North Melbourne ended its partnership with Tasmania after 14 years to pursue a new deal in Western Australia.
