= Tasmanian Devils (2001–2008) =

Australian rules football club

Names
- Full name: Tasmania Football Club
- Nickname: Devils
- Club song: "We're from Tasmania"

2008 season
- Home-and-away season: 14th

Club details
- Founded: 2001
- Dissolved: 2008
- Colours: Green; Black; Yellow
- Competition: Victorian Football League
- President: Guy Abel
- Coach: Lance Spaulding
- Captain: Brett Geappen
- Grounds: Bellerive Oval
- York Park
- Devonport Oval; West Park Oval; Ulverstone Football Ground
- Former ground: North Hobart Oval

Other information
- Official website: devilsfc.com

The Tasmanian Devils was an Australian rules football club based in Tasmania that competed in the Victorian Football League (VFL). Owned and run by AFL Tasmania, the club took part in the VFL from 2001 to 2008 as the only non-Victorian club in the league.

The club participated in 157 official VFL matches during its eight season tenure recording a 59-96-2 playing record, recording its highest finish of Preliminary Finalist in 2004, where they were defeated by eventual premier, Sandringham.

The Devils played the majority of their home games at Bellerive Oval in Hobart alongside regular fixtures at York Park in Launceston. At the end of the 2008 season, AFL Tasmania decided to withdraw the Devils from the VFL in favour of restarting a new Tasmanian league encompassing the entire state.

Tasmania returned to the VFL in 2026 after a successful Tasmanian AFL bid in 2023, with the new AFL team, Tasmania Devils, to field a side before entering the AFL in 2028.

== History ==
During the 1990s, Tasmania had shown strong interest in joining the Australian Football League (AFL), and after rejected bids in 1995 and 1997, the AFL instigated the formation of a Tasmanian team for the newly re-constructed Victorian Football League (VFL). The Tasmanian Devils formed in 2001 and were admitted into the VFL in its inaugural season the same year. The AFL continued to own the club.

The nickname "Devils" was chosen as the moniker for the club after the tenacious marsupial predator the Tasmanian devil, which is indigenous to the island of Tasmania. The club colours of green, red, gold and black were inspired by the original State of Origin "map" guernsey and are also Tasmania's sporting colours.

The Devils established home grounds in both Hobart and Launceston to deal with the long-standing north–south rivalry. Originally, northern home games were played at Launceston's York Park, while North Hobart Oval hosted games in the south. Occasional games were played in the north west, with Ulverstone, Devonport and Burnie each hosting a couple of games across the club's tenure.

The Devils' first two seasons brought mediocre results, but, under the direction of coach Matthew Armstrong, they made the finals for the first time in 2003, finishing third. The 2004 and 2005 seasons saw the Devils again make the finals. At the end of the 2005 season, the team moved from North Hobart Oval to Bellerive Oval for home games in the south and began playing all northern home games at York Park.

Following the trend of AFL clubs aligning themselves with VFL clubs for the match fitness of reserves players, in 2005, the Kangaroos expressed intentions to align with the Devils. A deal was struck that allowed a capped number of players from the Kangaroos to compete with either the Devils or North Ballarat in the VFL, starting in the 2006 season. This arrangement lasted two years and was unpopular among local fans, significantly harming the popularity of the club.

2006 proved to be a disappointment on-field, with the Devils finishing ninth and missing the finals. During the season, Armstrong had stepped down as coach due to internal pressure from the playing group, ending his six-year term in charge of the Devils. North Hobart premiership coach and former Devils player Brendon Bolton was made stand-in coach for the remainder of the year.

Players walk off Bellerive Oval following the club's final match

Tasmanian and former Sydney player Daryn Cresswell was named coach of the club for 2007, after a successful career as an assistant coach at Geelong and the Brisbane Lions. However, hampered in part by Cresswell's off-field issues, which included a gambling addiction and eventual fraud conviction, the club finished wooden spooners both seasons he coached the team, winning only six of a total 34 games.

At the end of the 2008 season, AFL Tasmania decided to withdraw the Devils from the VFL in favour of restarting a new Tasmanian league encompassing the entire state. The club played its final match in round 20, losing to Box Hill by 92 points at Bellerive Oval.

== Coaches ==
- 2001–2006 Matthew Armstrong
- 2006 Brendon Bolton
- 2007—2008 Daryn Cresswell
- 2008 Lance Spaulding

== Club Records and statistics ==
Highest score	26.21 (177) v North Ballarat, Round 4, 2003, North Hobart Oval
Lowest score	2.4 (16) v Werribee, Round 11, 2004, Devonport Oval
Greatest winning margin	123 points v North Ballarat, Round 4, 2003, North Hobart Oval
Greatest losing margin	154 points v Box Hill, Round 5, 2001, Box Hill City Oval
Lowest winning score	10.9 (69) v Frankston 5.9 (39), Round 16, 2003, Frankston Park
Highest losing score	21.13 (139) v Geelong 22.9 (141), Round 2, 2005, North Hobart Oval
Highest crowd attendance	11,456 v Northern Bullants, 2nd Semi Final, 2005, Bellerive Oval

== Individual awards ==
Alastair Lynch Medalists (Best and Fairest):

- Leigh Walker (2001)
- Cameron Blight & Ben Atkin (2002)
- Jordan Doering (2003)
- Matthew Jovanovic (2004)
- Ian Callinan (2005)
- Brett Geappen (2006)
- Leigh Adams (2007)
- Cameron Thurley (2008)

JJ Liston Trophy Medallists:

- Ian Callinan (2005)

== Sponsors ==
Major Jumper Sponsors:

- Wrest Point Hotel Casino (2006–2008)
- Patrick (2001–2005)

Apparel Sponsors:

- Burley-Sekem (2001–2008)

Ball Sponsors:

- Jetstar

== Club song ==
The club song was sung to the tune of Richmond's club song, "We're From Tigerland".

Oh, we're from Tasmania
A fighting fury, we're from Tasmania
In any weather, you will see us with a grin, hey!
Risking head and chin, hey!
When behind, then never mind
We'll fight and fight and win
Oh we're from Tasmania
We never weaken 'till the final siren sounds
Like the players of old
We're strong and we're bold
Oh we're from Tassie
The devils are back
Oh we're from Tasmania

== See also ==
- Tasmania Devils (AFL team)
- Tasmania Devils (under-18s team)
- Tassie Mariners
