= History of the Tasmanian AFL bid =

Football league history

- Proposed name: Tasmania Devils
- Status: Successful (2023)

Location
- Region: Tasmania
- Proposed stadium: Macquarie Point Stadium, Hobart; York Park, Launceston; Bellerive Oval, Hobart; North Hobart Oval, Hobart; Hobart Stadium, Hobart; TCA Ground, Hobart; KGV Oval, Hobart; Dial Regional Sports Complex, Penguin

Sport information
- Sport: Australian rules football
- League: Australian Football League (AFL); AFL Women's (AFLW); Victorian Football League (VFL); VFL Women's (VFLW)

History
- First proposed: 1987 (informally), 1992 (official)

The history of the Tasmanian AFL bid covers a series of proposals and bids between 1987 and 2023 for a Tasmanian-based Australian rules football team in the Australian Football League and AFL Women's premierships. Eight formal proposals for a new or relocated club to represent Tasmania were made over this time, the earliest coming in 1992, while informal proposals were raised as early as 1987, when the Victorian Football League commenced its expansion to become a national competition.

The final bid, a $150 million bid backed by the Tasmanian government and federal funding for a new stadium at Macquarie Point, Hobart, was accepted by the league on 2 May 2023. Tasmania will compete in the AFL from 2028.

== Australian rules football in Tasmania ==
Tasmania has been a stronghold of Australian rules football since the 1860s. Pictured is the 1911 Tasmanian state side from the Adelaide carnival where they beat the Western Australian state team on Adelaide Oval.

Australian rules football has been the primary code of football played in Tasmania for as long as the mainland states, with the first clubs formed in the early 1860s. The state was a full member of the Australian National Football Council, and hosted the national football carnival in 1924, 1947 and 1966. The largest attendance at a football game in Tasmania was set at the 1979 TANFL Grand Final with 24,968 spectators watching Clarence defeat Glenorchy by three points at North Hobart Oval.

== 1991–1993: AFL expresses interest and Tasmania declines licence ==
Following the expansion of the AFL into Queensland and Western Australia (1987) and South Australia (1991), the AFL and its clubs first took an interest in Tasmania. Tasmania also took an interest in the AFL; Clarence president Roger Curtis noted in 1992 a decline in local Tasmanian football attendances linked to broader access to televised AFL, commenting "the only way to get the kids playing football here is to give them access to the best product available and that, of course, is AFL football." The Tasmanian Football League was in a dire financial position at the time, and the AFL granted the TFL a rescue package of AUD$250,000.

Struggling Melbourne club Fitzroy became the first AFL club to play regular premiership games in Tasmania, playing two games per season at North Hobart Oval in each of 1991 and 1992 The Tasmanian Government offered the AFL $70,000 to continue the arrangement, but it was ruled financially unviable to continue.

In October 1992, an opportunity arose when the AFL Commission voted on whether or not to axe the Sydney Swans, as the club had accrued over AUD $9 million of debt since its relocation from South Melbourne to Sydney in 1982. Tasmania was an option at this point, but the TFL declined the licence fee, reported to be around AUD $4 million, and announced it would be at least 10 years before it would be ready to enter the AFL. The AFL ended up preparing a multi-million dollar assistance package to keep the Sydney club viable.

== 1994–1997: 16th AFL licences ==
After Fremantle was awarded the 16th AFL licence in 1994, the prospect of expansion into Tasmania was raised again. Tasmanian Sports Minister Peter Hodgman spoke to the AFL about the possible introduction of a local team to the league, and raised the possibility of state funding. Between 1994 and 1997, the bid was prepared for a Tasmanian team that involved the construction of a 30,000-capacity stadium at the Hobart Showgrounds in Glenorchy, at the cost of approximately $30 million.

At the time, the AFL Commission and club executives were of the view that the league could not sustain more than 16 clubs, and expressed concerns that Tasmania's small market and declining number of drafted AFL players were barriers to entry. The collapse of Fitzroy, which had its AFL playing operations absorbed by Brisbane at the end of 1996, created a place in the 16-team competition that was filled by Port Adelaide.

State-level football in Tasmania also had its own problems in the late 1990s, with the Tasmanian Statewide League collapsing in 2000. However, two new advancements were made in the early 2000s: first, the establishment of the Tasmanian Devils Football Club to compete in the Victorian Football League between 2001 and 2008; and second, the establishment of a long-term deal by Hawthorn to play regular home games at York Park in Launceston starting from the 2001 season, originally one per year but increasing to four per year since 2008. St Kilda also had a deal to play games in Launceston between 2003 and 2006.

== 2008–2011: Tasmania beaten by Gold Coast and Western Sydney ==
"Tasmanians already watch AFL"

— Andrew Demetriou, former AFL CEO and North Melbourne and Hawthorn player responding to questions regarding why Tasmania is not a priority in 2009.

The AFL's next period of expansion began in the late 2000s, and by 2008 had awarded its 17th and 18th licences to the Gold Coast Suns (commenced playing in 2011) and the Greater Western Sydney Giants (2012). These were targeted expansions covering Gold Coast, Western Sydney and Canberra – three rugby league dominated markets with large growth potential.

These expansions into non-traditional markets, at the expense of Tasmania as a traditional football state, and with two clubs which over their first fifteen years remained unprofitable as stand-alone entities, began to stir controversy about Tasmania's absence from the league. Popular opinion began to take the view that, perhaps financially but certainly romantically, Tasmania deserved its own team. The matter became so controversial that the Government of Australia conducted a Senate inquiry in 2008. At the enquiry, Tasmanian senator Kerry O'Brien brought into question the AFL's commitment to the game in Tasmania, and stated that he believed that with continued neglect, the popularity of soccer could overtake Australian rules football in Tasmania. The AFL argued that New South Wales participation numbers were in excess of that in Tasmania, to further its argument that a team in Western Sydney was a higher priority. The Senate enquiry found that insurmountable cultural barriers would make such a move non-viable.

In April 2008, former Tasmanian premier Paul Lennon revived the push for an AFL team by travelling to AFL House in Melbourne and launching a bid for a 19th licence. Lennon retired in May, the responsibility of steering the bid went to Economic Development Minister Paula Wriedt. Wriedt said Tasmania only made the case for a Tasmanian team, and was not trying to beat the Gold Coast or Greater Western Sydney to be the 17th or 18th club. The bid received a significant boost in July 2008, when confectionery company Mars committed to being the proposed club's major sponsor. The bid was ultimately rejected, with Wriedt later commenting that Demetriou had been dismissive of the Tasmanian bid amidst his focus on the Gold Coast and Sydney teams.

Through this time, it was speculated that the AFL was holding Tasmania open as a soft target for relocation of struggling Melbourne clubs. In 2012, there was increased speculation when North Melbourne – which had considered relocation to Gold Coast prior to the Suns' admission – committed to move home games to Hobart's Bellerive Oval, initially two, then later four. As a result, Tasmania hosted eight AFL games annually throughout the late 2010s: North Melbourne hosting four in Hobart and Hawthorn hosting four in Launceston.

== 2011–2017: Off the agenda and bare draft crop ==
In April 2014, AFL deputy chief executive Gillon McLachlan said he supported a single team representing Tasmania. He stated Tasmania would be the next team to join the AFL, but that this would not happen for at least a decade.

In 2016, the Garlick report confirmed that a stand-alone Tasmanian team would have to wait until at least after the active broadcast deal expired at the end of the 2022 season to enter the AFL.

For the 2016 AFL National Draft, no Tasmanian players were drafted. In April 2017, the Tasmanian Government indicated its interest in relocating the Gold Coast Suns to Tasmania in the event that the club, which was still struggling, were to collapse.

In September 2017, the AFL awarded a licence for an AFL Women's team from the 2019 AFLW season for a joint project of the North Melbourne Football Club and the Government of Tasmania. The team was officially known as the North Melbourne Tasmanian Kangaroos.

== 2018 steering committee ==
In February 2018, Trisha Squires took over from Rob Auld as CEO of AFL Tasmania. At the time, the organisation was unsure whether Tasmania would be better off under its existing deals with Hawthorn and North Melbourne, or its own side. Squires described talk of a standalone Tasmanian team as a "distraction". Around the same time, the A-League (Australia's top soccer league) announced a planned expansion for 2019/20, and identified an ultimately unsuccessful Tasmanian bid as a contender.

In response, the AFL formed a Tasmanian football steering committee, which in July 2018 delivered recommendations to improve junior and state-level Tasmanian football – including funding targets, the re-establishment of Tasmanian teams in Victoria's under-18s and state-level senior leagues, and improved junior pathways – but did not recommend establishing a senior AFL team, instead determining that the success or failure of these plans would drive future efforts for a senior team.

In September 2018, AFL Tasmania announced that all of its representative Tasmanian football teams would be known as the Tasmania Devils and would wear green, yellow and maroon – the nickname and colours worn by VFL team which AFL Tasmania had administed between 2001 and 2008. The AFL applied for a trade mark with IP Australia for the Tasmania Devils logo in May 2019, and the Tasmania Devils under-18s team began playing in the NAB League from 2019.

== 2019 taskforce ==
The pathway to Tasmania's successful bid took its first major step in 2019, when AFL advised the Government of Tasmania its guideline prerequisites for an AFL team: at least 50,000 members; up-front capital of $40,000,000; a unified Tasmanian football community; AFL standard venues; a minimum of 10 Tasmanian-raised players in the AFL; and a respectful exit strategy for North Melbourne and Hawthorn. At this point, there were already 90,000 Tasmanian-based members of existing mainland AFL clubs.

In mid-2019, a government-appointed taskforce comprising businesspeople Brett Godfrey, Errol Stewart, Grant O'Brien, Julie Kay, Paul Eriksson and James Henderson formed to work on the bid. Under its 2019 planning basis, the taskforce aimed to enter the competition in 2025, and first proposed plans to build a new stadium and training facility at Hobart's Macquarie Point. In November 2019 the Taskforce run petition surpassed 60,000 pledges in support of a Tasmanian AFL team.

The bid's progress stalled in 2020 due to the uncertainty and upheaval of COVID-19 pandemic, particularly as the 2020 AFL season was suspended and the full financial impact was yet to be seen. However, the taskforce continued towards its original 2025 goal, and put forward its business case.

== 2021 bid ==
=== 2021: Conflict and the Carter report ===
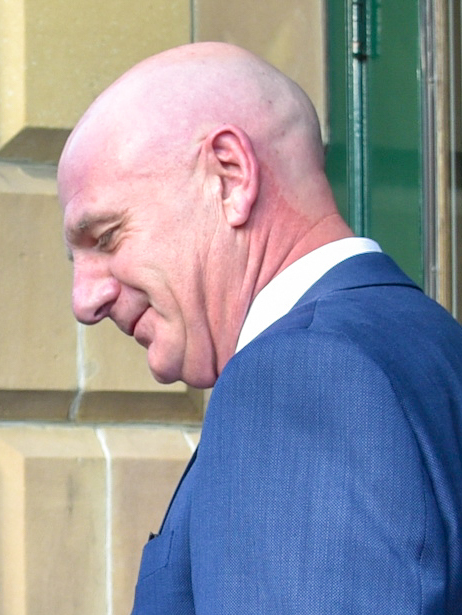
Tasmanian premier Peter Gutwein adopted a more aggressive stance on the Tasmanian bid than his predecessors

In 2020, Tasmania had a new premier in former East Launceston player Peter Gutwein, who took a much more aggressive stance than his predecessors in driving the Tasmanian bid with the AFL. In 2021, Gutwein's government refused to negotiate an extension of the deals enabling Hawthorn and North Melbourne to host home games in Launceston and Hobart respectively, until receiving a firm timetable for the introduction of a Tasmanian team. One week later, the AFL formally responded by rejecting this demand, and instead pledging to create an independent review into the merits of Tasmania's bid which would report back no later than early 2022. Gutwein lambasted the AFL in response, accusing it of stonewalling and claiming that "it beggars belief the AFL has not been able to consider [the business case submitted] fully over the last year and now, to add insult to injury, want to take up to another year before providing clarity on the future of a Tasmanian team". The AFL in turn highlighted the need to review financial and investments risks following the COVID-19 pandemic on the football industry.

The independent review was overseen by former AFL commissioner and Geelong Football Club president Colin Carter. The Carter Review was completed well ahead of schedule and presented to the AFL Commission in late July 2021. This review determined that a 19th licence could be awarded to a stand-alone Tasmanian team, but that a relocated team or a joint venture team between Tasmanian stakeholders and a Victorian team "would arguably produce a more sustainable outcome and therefore should be considered before a 19th licence". The report also found that the financial barriers to a 19th team could be overcome with the ongoing assistance of government and league funding.

Gutwein expressed annoyance that the report did not explicitly advocate for a 19th licence, and he continued to hold up the North Melbourne and Hawthorn home games. Subsequently the state government and the AFL agreed to extend these matches, while simultaneously committing to put the matter of a 19th licence to the 18 club presidents in March 2022.

=== 2022–23 bid submission and acceptance ===
Momentum for the bid began to build in 2022. In March 2022, Gutwein unveiled designs for a proposed 27,000-seat, retractable-roof stadium to be built at Regatta Point on the banks of the River Derwent, within walking distance of the Hobart City Centre, with an estimated cost of $750 million, and earliest completion date of 2027 – to be built contingent on the AFL bid being successful.

The same month, an AFL review concluded that it had the finances and resources to support a Tasmanian team in an expanded competition, after suffering far lower than feared losses during the COVID-19 pandemic, although significant State Government financial backing would also be required to secure their admission. At the AFL club presidents meeting ahead of the 2022 season launch, McLachlan said that while the ongoing work around Tasmania's bid remains confidential, that "The framework is there, the discussions are getting meatier, and the heavy lifting will be happening over the coming months."

In November 2022, in-principle agreement was reached between the AFL and Tasmanian Government – now under new premier Jeremy Rockliff – on commercial terms for Tasmania's bid for a 19th licence. The Tasmanian government's funding commitment included $12 million per year over 12 years, plus $60 million towards a high-performance and administration complex. The final outstanding prerequisite was securing full funding for the Macquarie Point Stadium. This was secured in April 2023, when the Albanese federal government committed $240 million of federal funding to the stadium.

With prerequisites met and the AFL Commission in favour, the only remaining step was a vote of the 18 club presidents which – under long-standing provisions in the AFL Constitution – required a two-thirds majority. The vote was held on 2 May 2023 and won unanimous support. The following day, AFL CEO Gillon McLachlan formally announced the team's admission to the AFL at a special press conference held at North Hobart Oval. McLachlan confirmed the team would enter the Australian Football League in the 2028 season, whilst the timeline for its admission into the AFL Women's competition would be developed later.

== Venues and travel ==
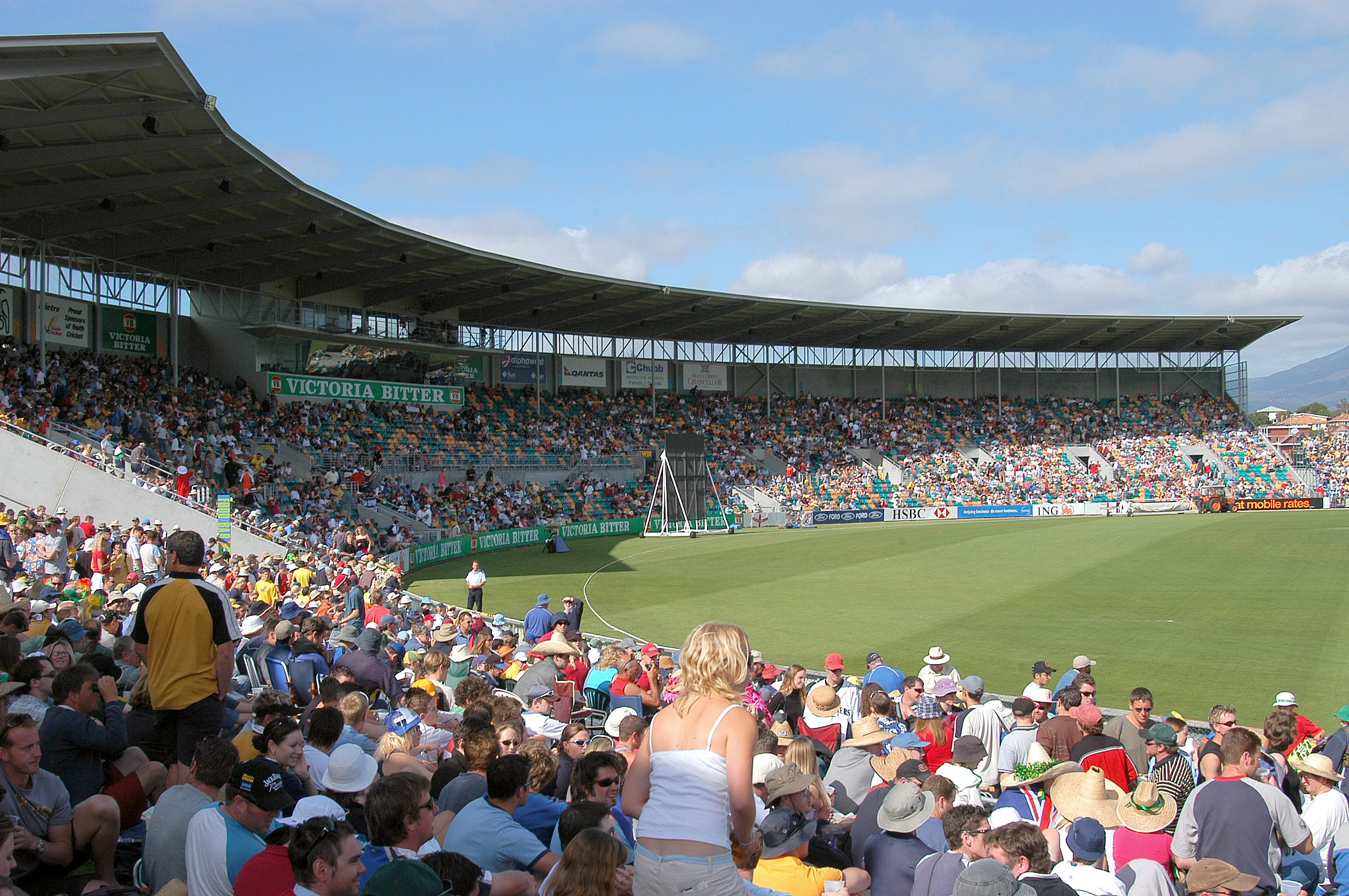
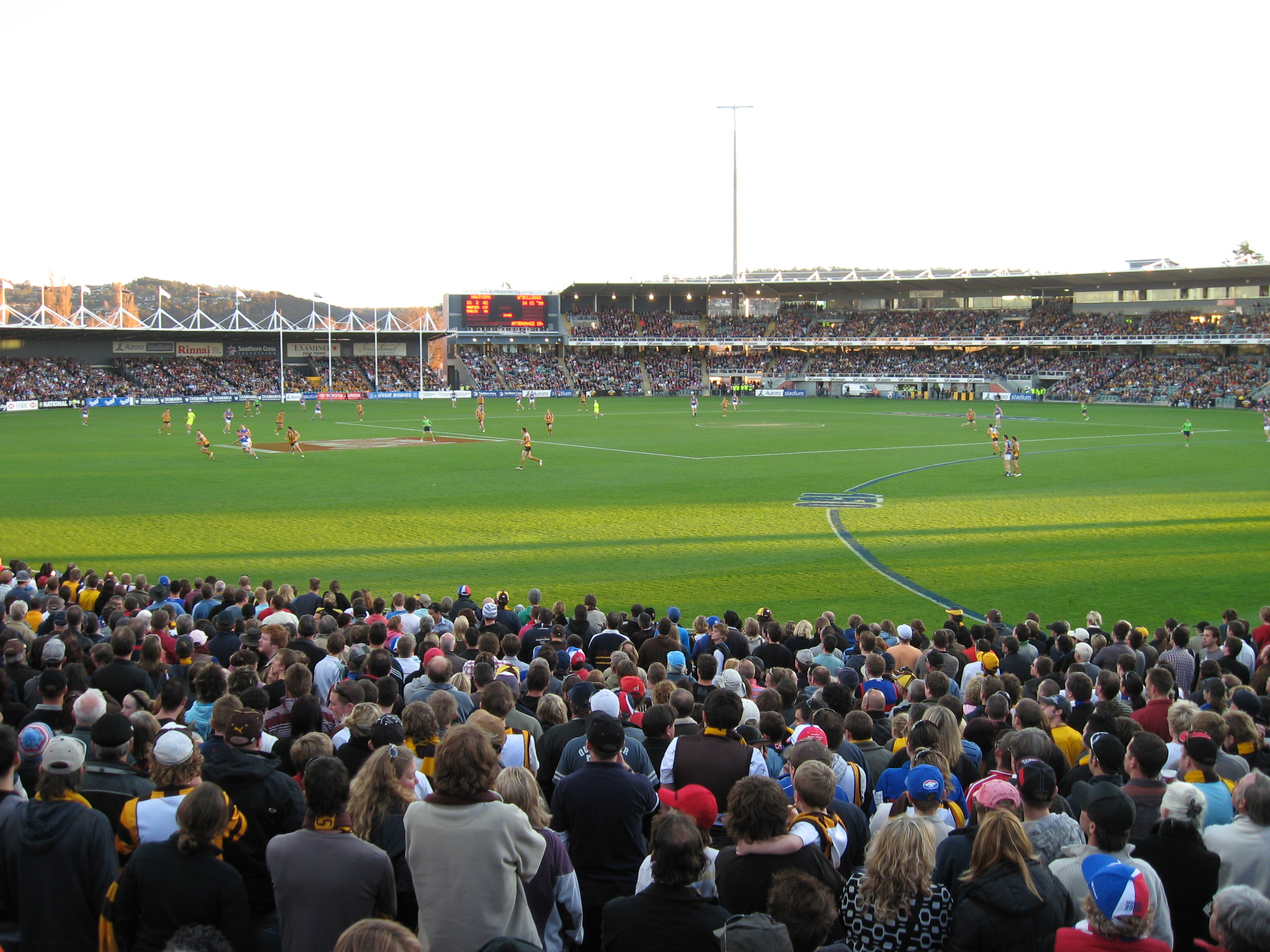
Left: Bellerive Oval would serve as the club's home ground in Hobart.
Right: Tasmania's potential second ground, UTAS Stadium (York Park) in Launceston.

Due to the distribution of Tasmania's relatively small population between Hobart in the south (250,000 as of 2021) and Launceston region in the north (151,195), as well as the long-standing football rivalry between the south and north of the state, it had long been proposed that a Tasmania club would use one home ground in each of the two cities, which are approximately 200 km apart.

A Tasmanian AFL team's main home venue in Hobart will be a new stadium at Macquarie Point, to begin construction in the near future, and be completed by 2029. Bellerive Oval is the current stadium in use in Hobart, with York Park the current stadium used in Launceston.

== In popular media ==
The development of the Tasmanian football team and stadium is satirised in the 2026 television comedy series Ground Up, which was developed by Gristmill for the ABC.
