= Daryn Cresswell =

Australian rules footballer

Personal information
- Born: 22 May 1971 (age 55)
- Original team: North Hobart
- Draft: No. 34, 1988 national draft
- Height: 183 cm (6 ft 0 in)
- Weight: 84 kg (185 lb)

Playing career^{1}
Years	Club	Games (Goals)
1992–2003	Sydney Swans	244 (208)
- ^{1} Playing statistics correct to the end of 2003.

Career highlights
- All-Australian 1997; Sydney Swans best and fairest 1994; Sydney Swans Team of the Century (interchange); Tasmania Football Team of the Century; 6× Sydney Swans best and fairest runner-up; 1996 AFL Best Player in Finals; 1998 State of Origin Captain Allies; 1997 State of Origin Vice Captain Allies; 2022 Sydney Swans Hall of Fame inductee; 7th Most Possessions for Sydney Swans

Daryn Cresswell (born 22 May 1971) is a former Australian rules footballer who played for the Sydney Swans in the Australian Football League, and the former senior coach of the Tasmanian Devils Football Club that played in the Victorian Football League. He is currently the Head Coach of the Corowa Rutherglen Football Club.

== Playing career ==
Cresswell started his football with Glenorchy in the Tasmanian Football League. He also briefly played for Geelong Reserves in the Victorian Football League. Daryn then returned to Tasmania to play with North Hobart in the TFL the following year. Daryn was then drafted to the Sydney Swans in the 1992 mid-season draft.

Cresswell played for the Swans for twelve seasons between 1992 and 2003, playing 244 games, the seventh-most games in Sydney and South Melbourne history. He was a member of the Swans' losing 1996 Grand Final team and was named in both the Swans and Tasmanian Teams of the Century. In 1993, in his second season, he won the Swans' most improved award; and, in the following season, he was awarded the Bob Skilton Medal as the Swans best for 1994. In 1997, he dislocated his kneecap while laying a tackle, knocked it back into place immediately, and played again the next week. Other notable moments in Cresswell's career include a number of game-winning goals. Particularly, a kick after the siren from Creswell scored a goal and secured victory for Sydney over North Melbourne in Round 4 of the 2002 season.

== Statistics ==
Legend
G	Goals	K	Kicks	D	Disposals	T	Tackles
B	Behinds	H	Handballs	M	Marks

Season	Team	No.	Games	Totals							Averages (per game)							Votes
Season	Team	No.	Games	G	B	K	H	D	M	T	G	B	K	H	D	M	T	Votes
1992	Sydney	28	8	4	14	100	56	156	23	1	0.5	1.8	12.5	7.0	19.5	2.9	0.1	0
1993	Sydney	28	18	29	15	224	83	307	75	18	1.6	0.8	12.4	4.6	17.1	4.2	1.0	0
1994	Sydney	28	21	15	13	275	152	427	84	26	0.7	0.6	13.1	7.2	20.3	4.0	1.2	3
1995	Sydney	8	22	17	13	306	201	507	111	24	0.8	0.6	13.9	9.1	23.0	5.0	1.1	3
1996	Sydney	8	24	11	22	363	161	524	106	56	0.5	0.9	15.1	6.7	21.8	4.4	2.3	3
1997	Sydney	8	23	16	14	367	244	611	71	32	0.7	0.6	16.0	10.6	26.6	3.1	1.4	6
1998	Sydney	8	24	21	13	375	264	639	85	15	0.9	0.5	15.6	11.0	26.6	3.5	0.6	13
1999	Sydney	8	23	18	11	352	284	636	98	26	0.8	0.5	15.3	12.3	27.7	4.3	1.1	7
2000	Sydney	8	22	23	11	364	202	566	108	31	1.0	0.5	16.5	9.2	25.7	4.9	1.4	11
2001	Sydney	8	18	16	12	237	115	352	77	31	0.9	0.7	13.2	6.4	19.6	4.3	1.7	8
2002	Sydney	8	22	17	15	277	223	500	81	48	0.8	0.7	12.6	10.1	22.7	3.7	2.2	2
2003	Sydney	8	19	21	6	217	159	376	91	31	1.1	0.3	11.4	8.4	19.8	4.8	1.6	5
Career			244	208	159	3457	2144	5601	1010	339	0.9	0.7	14.2	8.8	23.0	4.1	1.4	61

== Coaching and post-football life ==
Following his retirement as a player, Cresswell became an assistant coach—firstly at Geelong and then at Brisbane. He then moved back to Tasmania and coached the Tasmanian Devils in the VFL following the resignation of Matthew Armstrong.

In 2014, Daryn Creswell was appointed senior coach of the Wodonga Raiders in the Ovens and Murray Football League (O&MFL). The Raiders had finished the 2013 season with a 3–15 record, but under Creswell’s tenure from 2014 to 2018, the club qualified for four consecutive finals series.

Creswell joined the Wangaratta Rovers as senior coach ahead of the 2019 OMFNL season. The Rovers had recorded a winless 0–18 campaign in 2018. In his first year in charge, the club narrowly missed the finals on percentage, before qualifying for the finals in the next three seasons in which competition was held (2020 season cancelled due to COVID-19). Creswell departed the Rovers in 2022.

In 2024, Creswell became senior coach of the South Cairns Cutters in the AFL Cairns competition. That season, the Cutters won the premiership, with a playing group that included former VFL footballers Tyler Roos and Josh Clayton.

In 2025, Creswell returned to the OMFNL as senior coach of Corowa Rutherglen.

Business career

Outside football, Creswell is the Managing Director of a construction company based in Albury, New South Wales. The business (Executive Garden Scapes) has been involved in a number of local and large projects, including the construction of a retirement home in Rutherglen.
