= 2017 TSL season =

- Teams: 9
- Premiers: North Launceston
- Minor premiers: North Launceston
- Wooden spooners: Burnie
- Alistair Lynch Medallist: Bradley Cox-Goodyer (North Launceston)
- Peter Hudson Medallist: Jaye Bowden (Glenorchy)
- Matches played: 81

The 2017 AFL Tasmania TSL premiership season is an Australian rules football competition staged across Tasmania, Australia over twenty-one home and away rounds and six finals series matches between 31 March and 23 September.

The League was known as the Southern Cross State League under a commercial naming-rights sponsorship agreement with the company.

North Launceston defeated Lauderdale by 87 points to win the 2017 TSL Grand Final.

== Participating clubs ==
- Burnie Dockers Football Club
- Clarence District Football Club
- Devonport Football Club
- Glenorchy District Football Club
- Tigers Football Club
- North Hobart Football Club
- Lauderdale Football Club
- Launceston Football Club
- North Launceston Football Club

== 2017 TSL coaches ==
- Clint Proctor (Burnie)
- Jeromey Webberley (Clarence)
- Mitch Thorp (Devonport)
- Aaron Cornelius (Glenorchy)
- Kane Richter (Hobart City)
- Darren Winter (Lauderdale)
- Sam Lonergan (Launceston)
- Tom Couch (North Launceston)
- Scott Matheson & Aaron Vince (Tigers FC)

== Awards ==
- Alastair Lynch Medal (Best afield throughout season): Bradley Cox-Goodyer (North Launceston)
- Lefroy Medal (Best afield in State Game): Jay Lockhart (North Launceston)
- RACT Insurance Player of the Year (Best player voted by the media): Jaye Bowden (Glenorchy)
- Matthew Richardson Medal (Rookie of the Year): James Holmes (Clarence)
- Baldock Medal (Grand Final Best on Ground): Bradley Cox-Goodyer (North Launceston)
- Cazaly Medal (Premiership Coach in TSL): Tom Couch (North Launceston)
- Development League Grand Final Best On Ground: Luke Murfitt-Cowen (Clarence)
- Hudson Medal (Highest goal kicker in TSL season): Jaye Bowden (Glenorchy) 52 Goals

== 2017 TSL leading goalkickers ==
- Jaye Bowden (Glenorchy) - 53
- Sonny Whiting (Launceston) - 50
- Bradley Cox-Goodyer (North Launceston - 45
- Tom Couch (North Launceston) - 45
- Thor Boscott (Lauderdale) - 44

=== Highest Individual Goalkickers In a Match ===
- 11 – Jaye Bowden (Glenorchy) v (Devonport) – 8 April 2017 at KGV Oval
- 9 – Thor Boscott (Lauderdale) v (Tigers FC) – 15 July 2017 at Lauderdale Oval
- 8 – Bradley Cox-Goodyer (North Launceston) v (Lauderdale) – 23 September 2017 at UTAS Stadium
- 7 – Sonny Whiting (Launceston) v (Burnie) – 8 April 2017 at Windsor Park
- 7 – Trent Standen (Clarence) v (Glenorchy) – 6 May 2017 at KGV Oval
- 7 – Tom Couch (North Launceston) v (Hobart City) – 17 June 2017 at North Hobart Oval
- 7 – Rulla Kelly-Mansell (Launceston) v (Burnie) – 17 June 2017 at West Park Oval
- 7 – Ryan Wiggins (Lauderdale) v (Clarence) – 2 September 2017 at Blundstone Arena

== Premiership season ==
Source: TSL Season 2017 results and fixtures

=== Round 1 ===
	Round 1
Friday, 31 March (6:00pm)	Hobart City 8.8 (56)	def. by	Glenorchy 24.10 (154)	North Hobart Oval
Saturday, 1 April (1:00pm)	Tigers FC 10.11 (71)	def.	Burnie 6.12 (48)	Twin Ovals Complex
Saturday, 1 April (2:00pm)	Lauderdale 7.9 (51)	def. by	North Launceston 16.16 (112)	Lauderdale Oval
Saturday, 1 April (4:30pm)	Devoport 5.8 (38)	def. by	Launceston 9.12 (66)	Devonport Oval
	Bye; Clarence

=== Round 2 ===
	Round 2
Saturday, 8 April (2.00pm)	Launceston 17.14 (116)	def.	Burnie 8.6 (54)	Windsor Park
Saturday, 8 April (4.00pm)	Glenorchy 28.18 (186)	def.	Devonport 4.8 (32)	KGV Oval
Saturday, 8 April (6.00pm)	North Launceston 11.16 (82)	def.	Hobart City 6.9 (45)	UTAS Stadium
Sunday, 9 April (2.00pm)	Clarence 16.11 (107)	def.	Tigers FC 11.8 (74)	Blundstone Arena
	Bye; Lauderdale

=== Round 3 ===
	Round 3
Friday, 14 April (1.00pm)	Burnie 17.17 (119)	def.	Devonport 13.10 (88)	West Park Oval
Friday, 14 April (1.00pm)	Launceston 7.4 (46)	def. by	North Launceston 19.17 (131)	Windsor Park
Friday, 14 April (2.00pm)	Tigers FC 10.7 (67)	def.	Hobart City 8.15 (63)	Twin Ovals Complex
Saturday, 15 April (2.00pm)	Clarence 19.7 (121)	def.	Lauderdale 13.11 (89)	Blundstone Arena
	Bye; Glenorchy

=== Round 4 ===
	Round 4
Saturday, 22 April (1.00pm)	Hobart City 10.12 (72)	def.	Burnie 9.9 (63)	Queenborough Oval
Saturday, 22 April (2.00pm)	Devonport 8.9 (57)	def. by	Clarence 19.8 (122)	Devonport Oval
Saturday, 22 April (2.00pm)	Lauderdale 13.12 (90)	def. by	Launceston 15.11 (101)	Lauderdale Oval
Tuesday, 25 April (2.00pm)	Glenorchy 15.15 (105)	def.	Tigers FC 5.5 (35)	KGV Oval
	Bye; North Launceston
Hobart City hosted a home match at Queenborough Oval, the home venue of former TFL Club Sandy Bay.

=== Round 5 ===
	Round 5
Saturday, 29 April (2.00pm)	Lauderdale 10.14 (74)	def.	Hobart City 9.7 (61)	Lauderdale Oval
Saturday, 29 April (6.00pm)	Devonport 9.3 (57)	def. by	North Launceston 24.9 (153)	Devonport Oval
Sunday, 30 April (1.00pm)	Launceston 4.9 (33)	def. by	Clarence 10.11 (71)	Windsor Park
Sunday, 30 April (2.30pm)	Burnie 2.6 (18)	def. by	Glenorchy 20.22 (142)	West Park Oval
	Bye; Tigers FC

=== Round 6 ===
	Round 6
Saturday, 6 May (2.00pm)	North Launceston 20.31 (151)	def.	Burnie 3.6 (24)	UTAS Stadium
Saturday, 6 May (4.00pm)	Glenorchy 8.7 (55)	def. by	Clarence 14.7 (91)	KGV Oval
Saturday, 6 May (6.00pm)	Hobart City 14.22 (106)	def.	Devonport 7.11 (53)	North Hobart Oval
Saturday, 6 May (6.00pm)	Tigers FC 9.4 (58)	def. by	Lauderdale 12.18 (90)	Twin Ovals Complex
	Bye; Launceston
Glenorchy's first loss at KGV since the 2014 TSL Season.

=== Round 7 ===
	Round 7
Saturday, 13 May (2:00pm)	Devonport 13.4 (82)	def. by	Lauderdale 18.18 (126)	Devonport Oval
Saturday, 13 May (2:00pm)	Clarence 11.13 (79)	def. by	Hobart City 12.8 (80)	Blundstone Arena
Saturday, 13 May (2:00pm)	Glenorchy 11.7 (73)	def. by	North Launceston 13.13 (91)	KGV Oval
Saturday, 13 May (2:00pm)	Tigers FC 3.5 (23)	def. by	Launceston 15.14 (104)	Twin Ovals Complex
	Bye; Burnie

=== Round 8 ===
	Round 8
Saturday, 20 May (1:00pm)	Burnie 5.7 (37)	def. by	Clarence 9.12 (66)	West Park Oval
Saturday, 20 May (2:00pm)	Hobart City 14.8 (92)	def.	Launceston 9.11 (65)	North Hobart Oval
Saturday, 20 May (2:00pm)	Glenorchy 7.9 (51)	def. by	Lauderdale 13.15 (93)	KGV Oval
Saturday, 20 May (2:00pm)	North Launceston 7.22 (64)	def.	Tigers FC 7.6 (48)	UTAS Stadium
	Bye; Devonport
Lauderdale's first win at KGV since the 2012 TSL Season.

=== Round 9 ===
	Round 9
Saturday, 27 May (1:00pm)	Tigers FC 11.8 (74)	def.	Devonport 9.9 (63)	Twin Ovals Complex
Saturday, 27 May (2:00pm)	Lauderdale 25.18 (168)	def.	Burnie 9.2 (56)	Lauderdale Oval
Saturday, 27 May (2:00pm)	Clarence 16.7 (103)	def.	North Launceston 12.14 (86)	Blundstone Arena
Saturday, 27 May (2:00pm)	Launceston 16.5 (101)	def.	Glenorchy 4.7 (31)	Windsor Park
	Bye; Hobart City
Launceston's Rulla Kelly-Mansell changed numbers for the game changing from number 26 to number 67 in recognition of the 1967 referendum for the AFL Indigenous Round.

=== Round 10 ===
	Round 10
Saturday, 3 June (1:00pm)	Burnie 14.17 (101)	def. by	Tigers FC 15.13 (103)	West Park Oval
Saturday, 3 June (2:00pm)	North Launceston 17.8 (110)	def. by	Lauderdale 18.3 (111)	UTAS Stadium
Saturday, 3 June (2:00pm)	Launceston 11.16 (82)	def.	Devonport 8.4 (52)	Windsor Park
Saturday, 3 June (6:00pm)	Glenorchy 10.15 (75)	def.	Hobart City 3.4 (22)	KGV Oval
	Bye; Clarence
Tigers FC's first ever win at West Park

=== Round 11 ===
	Round 11
Saturday, 17 June (2:00pm)	Devonport 5.8 (38)	def. by	Glenorchy 10.15 (75)	Devonport Oval
Saturday, 17 June (2:00pm)	Tigers FC 7.8 (50)	def. by	Clarence 16.15 (111)	Twin Ovals Complex
Saturday, 17 June (2:00pm)	Hobart City 11.7 (73)	def. by	North Launceston 21.13 (139)	North Hobart Oval
Saturday, 17 June (3:30pm)	Burnie 6.7 (43)	def. by	Launceston 24.18 (162)	West Park Oval
	Bye; Lauderdale

=== Round 12 ===
	Round 12
Friday, 23 June (7:00pm)	North Launceston 12.13 (85)	def.	Launceston 9.10 (64)	UTAS Stadium
Saturday, 24 June (1:00pm)	Devonport 14.10 (94)	def.	Burnie 9.6 (60)	Devonport Oval
Saturday, 24 June (2:00pm)	Hobart City 11.12 (78)	def.	Tigers FC 3.6 (24)	North Hobart Oval
Saturday, 24 June (2:00pm)	Lauderdale 11.7 (73)	def. by	Clarence 14.7. (91)	Lauderdale Oval
	Bye; Glenorchy

=== Round 13 ===
	Round 13
Saturday, 1 July (1:00pm)	Clarence 19.11 (125)	def.	Devonport 5.6 (36)	Blundstone Arena
Saturday, 1 July (1:00pm)	Launceston 12.6 (78)	def. by	Lauderdale 16.9 (105)	Windsor Park
Saturday, 1 July (2:00pm)	Tigers FC 10.12 (72)	def. by	Glenorchy 14.13 (97)	Twin Ovals Complex
Saturday, 1 July (2:30pm)	Burnie 6.4 (40)	def. by	Hobart City 8.14 (62)	West Park Oval
	Bye; North Launceston

=== Round 14 ===
	Round 14
Saturday, 8 July (1:00pm)	Glenorchy 24.22 (166)	def.	Burnie 3.4 (22)	KGV Oval
Saturday, 8 July (2:00pm)	Clarence 16.8 (104)	def.	Launceston 11.11 (77)	Blundstone Arena
Saturday, 8 July (2:00pm)	Hobart City 8.8 (56)	def. by	Lauderdale 21.19 (145)	North Hobart Oval
Sunday, 9 July (2:00pm)	North Launceston 11.17 (83)	def.	Devonport 10.4 (64)	Invermay Park
	Bye; Tigers FC

=== Round 15 ===
	Round 15
Saturday, 15 July (2:00pm)	Devonport 5.10 (40)	def. by	Hobart City 10.7 (67)	Devonport Oval
Saturday, 15 July (2:00pm)	Clarence 12.14 (86)	def. by	Glenorchy 16.13 (109)	Blundstone Arena
Saturday, 15 July (2:00pm)	Lauderdale 20.22 (142)	def.	Tigers FC 7.8 (50)	Lauderdale Oval
Sunday, 16 July (2:00pm)	Burnie 9.9 (63)	def. by	North Launceston 11.17 (83)	West Park Oval
	Bye; Launceston

=== Round 16 ===
	Round 16
Saturday, 22 July (1:00pm)	North Launceston 9.10 (64)	def.	Glenorchy 8.12 (60)	UTAS Stadium
Saturday, 22 July (2:00pm)	Hobart City 7.9 (51)	def. by	Clarence 15.16 (106)	North Hobart Oval
Saturday, 22 July (2:00pm)	Lauderdale 17.22 (124)	def.	Devonport 10.5 (65)	Lauderdale Oval
Saturday, 22 July (2:00pm)	Launceston 8.20 (68)	def.	Tigers FC 9.9 (63)	Windsor Park
	Bye; Burnie
Lauderdale Coach Darren Winter's 150th game as coach of Lauderdale

=== Round 17 ===
	Round 17
Saturday, 29 July (2:00pm)	Tigers FC 6.10 (46)	def. by	North Launceston 17.16 (118)	Twin Ovals Complex
Saturday, 29 July (2:00pm)	Launceston 5.17 (47)	def. by	Hobart City 8.8 (56)	Windsor Park
Sunday, 30 July (12:00pm)	Clarence 17.17 (119)	def.	Burnie 11.10 (76)	Blundstone Arena
Sunday, 30 July (1:00pm)	Lauderdale 11.16 (82)	def.	Glenorchy 10.9 (69)	Lauderdale Oval
	Bye; Devonport

=== Round 18 ===
	Round 18
Saturday, 5 August (1:00pm)	Burnie 7.6 (48)	def. by	Lauderdale 18.18 (126)	West Park Oval
Saturday, 5 August (2:00pm)	Devonport 11.9 (75)	def.	Tigers FC 9.12 (66)	Devonport Oval
Saturday, 5 August (2:00pm)	Glenorchy 14.6 (90)	def.	Launceston 12.12 (84)	KGV Oval
Saturday, 5 August (2:00pm)	North Launceston 21.7 (133)	def.	Clarence 9.10 (64)	UTAS Stadium
	Bye; Hobart City

=== Round 19 ===
	Round 19
Saturday, 12 August (1:00pm)	Devonport 2.5 (17)	def. by	Launceston 6.8 (44)	Devonport Oval
Saturday, 12 August (2:00pm)	Lauderdale 17.13 (115)	def.	Hobart City 4.9 (33)	Lauderdale Oval
	Bye; Burnie, Clarence, Glenorchy, North Launceston, Tigers FC

=== Round 20 ===
	Round 20
Saturday, 19 August (2:00pm)	North Launceston 23.22 (160)	def.	Burnie 2.6 (18)	UTAS Stadium
Saturday, 19 August (2:00pm)	Tigers FC 8.8 (56)	def. by	Glenorchy 16.13 (109)	Twin Ovals Complex
Saturday, 19 August (2:00pm)	Clarence 9.10 (64)	def.	Lauderdale 9.9 (63)	Blundstone Arena
	Bye; Devonport, Hobart City, Launceston
Burnie's lowest score in the TSL

=== Round 21 ===
	Round 21
Friday, 25 August (6:30pm)	Hobart City 14.12 (96)	def.	Tigers FC 11.11 (77)	North Hobart Oval
Friday, 25 August (7:00pm)	Burnie 14.8 (92)	def.	Devonport 12.12 (84)	West Park Oval
Saturday, 26 August (2:00pm)	Launceston 9.4 (58)	def. by	North Launceston 14.10 (94)	Windsor Park
Saturday, 26 August (2:00pm)	Glenorchy 10.10 (70)	def.	Clarence 8.7 (55)	KGV Oval
	Bye; Lauderdale

== Ladder ==
2017 TSL Ladder
Pos	Team	Pld	W	L	D	PF	PA	PP	Pts
1	North Launceston (MP) (P)	18	16	2	0	1939	1068	181.6	64
2	Clarence	18	14	4	0	1686	1249	135.0	56
3	Lauderdale	18	13	5	0	1867	1306	143.0	52
4	Glenorchy	18	12	6	0	1717	1098	156.4	48
5	Launceston	18	9	9	0	1409	1246	113.1	36
6	Hobart City	18	9	9	0	1169	1445	80.9	36
7	Tigers FC	18	4	14	0	1057	1639	64.5	16
8	Devonport	18	2	16	0	1042	1783	58.4	8
9	Burnie	18	2	16	0	982	2034	48.3	8

Rules for classification: 1) points; 2) percentage; 3) number of points for.
(P) Premiers; (MP) Minor Premiers

== Season records ==
=== Highest club scores ===
- 28.18. (186) – Glenorchy v Devonport 8 April 2017 at KGV Oval
- 25.18. (168) - Lauderdale v Burnie 27 May 2017 at Lauderdale Oval
- 24.22. (166) – Glenorchy v Burnie 8 July 2017 at KGV Oval

=== Lowest club scores ===
- 2.5. (17) – Devonport v Launceston 6.8. (44) – 12 August 2017 at Devonport Oval
- 2.6. (18) – Burnie v Glenorchy 29.14. (188) – 30 April 2017 at West Park Oval
- 2.6. (18) – Burnie v North Launceston 23.22. (160) – 19 August 2017 at UTAS Stadium

== TSL Team Of The Year ==
2017 TSL Team of The Year
B:	Jordan Arnold (Glenorchy)	Jason Bailey (Clarence)	James Holmes (Clarence)
HB:	Mitch Carter (Tigers FC)	Josh McGuinness (Lauderdale)	Jay Foon (North Launceston)
C:	Rhys Mott (Glenorchy)	Brayden Webb (Glenorchy) (Captain)	Nat Franklin (Lauderdale)
HF:	Thor Boscott (Lauderdale)	Tom Bennett (North Launceston)	Tom Couch (North Launceston)
F:	Dylan Riley (Devonport)	Jaye Bowden (Glenorchy)	Trent Standen (Clarence)
Foll:	Alex Lee (North Launceston)	Bradley Cox-Goodyer (North Launceston) (Vice-Captain)	Brodie Palfreyman (Launceston)
Int:	Ryan Matthews (Hobart City)	Dylan Fyfe (Lauderdale)	Sam Siggins (Clarence)
Int:	Rulla Kelly-Mansell (Launceston)		
Coach:	Tom Couch (North Launceston)		

== TSL Finals Series ==
=== Elimination Final ===
(Saturday 2 September)

- Launceston: 1.4. (10) | 4.6. (30) | 10.10. (70) | 14.15. (99)
- Glenorchy: 2.2. (14) | 5.7. (37) | 6.8. (44) | 10.10. (70)

at Blundstone Arena

=== Qualifying Final ===
(Saturday 2 September)

- Lauderdale: 6.2. (38) | 8.2. (50) | 12.6. (78) | 20.6. (126)
- Clarence: 3.2. (20) | 7.10. (52) | 9.15. (69) | 10.19. (79)

at Blundstone Arena

=== 1st Semi-Final ===
- Launceston: 1.0. (6) | 6.2. (38) | 9.4. (58) | 13.8. (86)
- Clarence: 3.2. (20) | 4.4. (28) | 5.7. (37) | 7.11. (53)

at Blundstone Arena

=== 2nd Semi-Final ===
- North Launceston: 5.5. (35) | 9.9. (63) | 14.13. (97) | 18.21. (129)
- Lauderdale: 0.3. (3) | 2.10. (22) | 4.11. (35) | 4.11. (35)

at UTAS Stadium

=== Preliminary Final ===
- Lauderdale: 2.3. (15) | 7.7. (49) | 10.8. (68) | 12.14. (86)
- Launceston: 5.3. (33) | 6.5. (41) | 9.7. (61) | 9.8. (62)

at Blundstone Arena

=== Grand Final ===
2017 TSL Grand Final
Saturday 23 September (3:30 pm)	North Launceston Bombers	def.	Lauderdale Bombers	UTAS Stadium (crowd: 6,108)
3.6 (24); 13.10 (88); 17.13 (115); 21.22 (148)	Q1; Q2; Q3; Final	1.2 (8); 3.4 (22); 6.7 (43); 9.7 (61)	Darrel Baldock Medal: Bradley Cox-Goodyer (North Launceston)
B. Cox-Goodyer 8, M. Walsh 3, T. Couch 2, J. Pearce 2, T. Thomas 2, T. Whitford 2, B. Simpson, T. Bennett	Goals	R. Wiggins 4, A. Hill 2, R. McManus, M. Kleverkamp, A. Hevey
B. Cox-Goodyer, A. Richter-Salter, J. Ponting, J. Pearce, T. Whitford, M. Walsh	Best	M. Anderton, J. Roberts, P. Bellchambers, N.Franklin, A. Hevey, A. Hill

=== Mercury Cup Grand Final (Development League) ===
(Saturday 23 September)

- Clarence: 3.1. (19) | 4.1. (25) | 7.5. (47) | 11.7. (73)
- Launceston: 3.2. (20) | 6.3. (39) | 8.4. (52) | 8.7. (55)

at UTAS Stadium

== State Game ==
2017 State Game
Saturday 10 June	Tasmania	def. by	North East Australia	Blundstone Arena
1.2 (8); 2.5 (17); 4.7 (31); 5.8 (38)	Q1; Q2; Q3; Final	2.1 (13); 5.4 (34); 7.5 (47); 8.7 (55)
J. Bowden 1, B. Walsh 1, B. Cox-Goodyer 1, B. McCulloch 1, T. Standen 1	Goals	A. Boston 3, J. Harper 1, D. Bonney 1, X. Richards 1, J. Anthony 1, T. Barrett 1
T. Couch, C. Duffy, B. Webb, J. Bowden, J. Lockhart, N. McKenna	Best	G. Grose, J. Harper, J. Keras, R. Hebron, D. Bonney, S. Tape
