= 2009 TSL season =

- Teams: Burnie Dockers; Clarence Kangaroos; Devonport Magpies; Glenorchy Magpies; Hobart Tigers; Lauderdale Bombers; Launceston Blues; North Hobart Demons; North Launceston Bombers; South Launceston Bulldogs
- Premiers: Clarence
- Minor premiers: Glenorchy

The 2009 AFL Tasmania TSL premiership season was an Australian rules football competition, staged across Tasmania, Australia over eighteen roster rounds and six finals series matches between 4 April and 19 September 2009.

This was the first season of a return to statewide football after a hiatus of eight seasons caused by the collapse of the former TFL in December 2000.

The League was known as the Wrest Point Tasmanian State League under a commercial naming-rights sponsorship agreement with Wrest Point Casino in Hobart.

== Participating Clubs ==
- Burnie Dockers Football Club
- Clarence District Football Club
- Devonport Football Club
- Glenorchy District Football Club
- Hobart Football Club
- Lauderdale Football Club
- Launceston Football Club
- North Hobart Football Club
- North Launceston Football Club
- South Launceston Football Club

=== 2009 TSL Club Coaches ===
- Justin Plapp (Burnie)
- Brett Geappen (Clarence)
- Errol Bourne (Devonport)
- Ben Reid (Glenorchy)
- Todd Lewis & Graham Fox (Hobart)
- Cam De Gooyer (Lauderdale)
- Adam Sanders (Launceston)
- Matthew Geappen (North Hobart)
- Chris Whitford (North Launceston)
- Luke McLean (South Launceston)

=== Wrest Point TSL (Reserves) Grand Final ===
- Launceston 12.12 (84) v Glenorchy 4.13 (37) – Bellerive Oval

=== Statewide League (Under-19's) Grand Final ===
- Lauderdale 10.11 (71) v Clarence 4.3 (27) – Bellerive Oval

=== Leading Goalkickers: Tasmanian State League ===
- Brad Dutton (Clarence) – 75
- David Hunt (Glenorchy) – 52
- Robbie Devine (Nth Hobart) – 50
- Darren Crawford (Nth Launceston) – 50

=== Medal Winners ===
- Kurt Heazlewood (Devonport) – Tassie Medal
- Brett Geappen (Clarence) – Darrel Baldock Medal (Best player in TSL Grand Final)
- Brett Geappen (Clarence) – Cazaly Medal (TSL Premiership coach)
- Brad Dutton (Clarence) – Hudson Medal (TSL Leading goalkicker)
- James Lovell (Burnie) – Eade Medal (Reserves)
- Rhys Williamson (Lauderdale) – Under-19's Medal (Statewide U/19's)
- Simon Dudgeon (Lauderdale) – John Leedham Medal (Southern U/17's)
- Shane Piuselli (Glenorchy) & Justin Plapp (Burnie) – Lefroy Medal (Best player/s in Interstate match)

=== Interstate Matches ===
Representative Match (Saturday, 7 June 2009)

- Tasmania 20.9 (129) v Queensland 11.14 (80) – Att: 2,879 at Bellerive Oval

== TSL records ==
=== Highest Club Scores ===
- 30.20 (200) – Burnie v Nth Launceston 14.11 (95) – 9 May 2009 at West Park Oval
- 24.25 (169) – Burnie v Hobart 7.9 (51) – 13 June 2009 at West Park Oval
- 25.15 (165) – Glenorchy v Burnie 14.10 (94) – 5 September 2009 at Bellerive Oval

=== Lowest Club Scores ===
- 0.7 (7) – Sth Launceston v Burnie 5.11 (41) – 11 July 2009 at West Park Oval
- 2.10 (22) – Hobart v Lauderdale 4.7 (31) – 1 August 2009 at TCA Ground
- 4.3 (27) – Lauderdale v Glenorchy 21.14 (140) – 27 June 2009 at KGV Football Park

=== Highest Individual Quarter Club Scores ===
- 11.4 (70) – Burnie v Hobart 1.1 (7) – (1st Quarter) – 13 June 2009 at West Park Oval
- 10.6 (66) – Burnie v Nth Launceston 0.3 (3) – (2nd Quarter) – 9 May 2009 at West Park Oval
- 10.5 (65) – Glenorchy v Lauderdale 1.0 (6) – (1st Quarter) – 27 June 2009 at KGV Football Park

=== Highest Individual Goalkickers (Match) ===
- 9 – Darren Crawford (North Launceston) v Clarence – 17 May 2009 at Aurora Stadium
- 8 – Jarrod Price (South Launceston) v Burnie – 18 April 2009 at Youngtown Memorial Ground
- 8 – Brad Davis (Burnie) v North Launceston – 9 May 2009 at West Park Oval
- 8 – Brad Dutton (Clarence) v Lauderdale – 23 May 2009 at Bellerive Oval
- 8 – Brad Dutton (Clarence) v North Hobart – 30 May 2009 at North Hobart Oval

== The Return of Statewide Football ==
For the 1986–2000 Statewide competition, see Statewide Football in Tasmania

After a hiatus of eight years, during 2008, AFL Tasmania announced plans for a return of the Tasmanian State League in 2009.

The concept attracted widespread public and media debate on the return of a statewide competition, with many in the football world hesitant over such a move due to the perilous financial position most of the participating clubs were left in after the previous competition was disbanded in 2000.

Many believed the push for a return of the league was a direct result of the media and the Tasmanian State Government's strong campaign in getting a Tasmanian team admitted into the AFL.

Under the AFL Tasmania plan, ten (10) clubs were invited to join the competition.

Clarence, Glenorchy, Hobart and North Hobart along with former Southern Amateur club Lauderdale in the South.

North Launceston, South Launceston and Launceston from the North and Devonport and Burnie Dockers from the North West Coast.

The response from many clubs was initially lukewarm at best with many concerned at the lack of detail in the AFL Tasmania plan and the rushed decision-making process of the move.

Ulverstone Football Club from the North West Coast bowed to pressure from its playing list and some factional groups within the club to put in a submission to join the TSL in 2009.

Despite a membership vote narrowly ending in favour of joining, the Robins had missed the AFL Tasmania enforced deadline and were initially to be included in the 2010 TSL Roster, however the remaining clubs (most notably its closest and most bitter rival Devonport) exerted considerable pressure upon the League not to alter the current makeup of teams for a period of ten years, therefore Ulverstone were excluded from joining.

SFL Premier League club Kingborough also lobbied AFL Tasmania to be included in the competition, but their case for inclusion was dismissed by the game's governing body due to their inadequate facilities and poor standard Kingston Beach Oval headquarters.

Former TFL club New Norfolk (1947–1999) was not invited to join the league because of their poor financial plight, however after the Eagles won the SFL Premiership with an undefeated season in 2009, there were calls to return them to top-flight status, however AFL Tasmania stated that there were no plans on the horizon to include a New Norfolk team in the competition in the near future.

As a result of the competition resuming, the Tasmanian Devils were removed from the Victorian Football League and were wound up.

On Monday 8 December 2008, the Wrest Point Tasmanian State League was launched at Wrest Point Casino in Hobart.

On 4 April 2009, the opening match of the reformed TSL competition took place at KGV Football Park between the reigning premiers of the SFL Premier League, Glenorchy and reigning NTFL premier Launceston and resulted in a 21-point triumph to the Blues.

The match was brought forward from Round 17 and billed as the "Battle of the State Premiers" given the extra spice created when the two clubs were due to meet at North Hobart Oval at the end of the 2008 season to play off for the Tasmanian State Premiership, but the match was called off due to Launceston's refusal to come to the Capital and participate in the match due to financial costs involved, with the NTFL refusing to fund the Blues match costs as the SFL had done with Glenorchy.

== Season summary ==
As the season commenced Glenorchy, Launceston and Burnie were touted amongst most of the State's football writers as premiership favourites with Clarence also looming on the horizon as an ever-present threat.

Poor weather would plague the season, with several grounds falling victim to heavy Winter rain across the State, Hobart received its wettest Winter since 1954 (and wettest year since 1958), rendering most grounds into quagmires, most notably the TCA Ground, KGV Football Park, Lauderdale Oval and North Hobart Oval all being closed by their respective Councils for long periods or even having matches moved away from them.

Both West Park and Devonport Oval would also suffer from the deluge and similarly would end up in very poor condition.

As it panned out, Burnie and Glenorchy led the competition for almost the entire season, with Clarence making a late charge after an indifferent start to the season.

Launceston, despite getting off to a winning start would suffer from many injuries during the season and struggle to put their best side on the ground for lengthy periods and as a result struggled for consistency but still managed to make the finals.

Devonport coach Errol Bourne had written off his young side's chances before the season had started stating that they would be just making up numbers, but after a strong start, the Coastal Magpies would fall into a heap in the middle part of the season losing six games in a row before they made a last-ditch effort to secure a finals berth, their mission accomplished after a tremendous victory over Hobart at the TCA Ground in which they trailed by 35-points during the final quarter in heavy conditions.

North Hobart, North Launceston and Hobart would battle it out in the latter rounds of the season for the last finals spot, the Demons produced a fine victory in heavy rain at West Park to lock in sixth spot, while a woefully out of form North Launceston would lose three of their final four matches to drop out and Hobart, under the guidance of stalwart Graham Fox after coach Todd Lewis' mid-season resignation, with a youthful side had produced some excellent wins throughout the season after a nightmare start, but ultimately poor percentage and narrow losses to Lauderdale twice (the latter in near hurricane-like conditions at the TCA Ground which was close to being abandoned at half-time where only one goal had been scored) and Devonport (mentioned above) would come back to haunt them.

As newly qualified players from the Southern Amateur contest, Lauderdale were having difficulty winning games owing to their lack of State League experience, although they played well at home. At the same time, there was a youthful South Launceston team that came last.

The finals series featured a Top Six for the first time, this was designed to give the finals series a more even blend of sides from the North and South owing to the uneven roster so as to ensure clubs played more games in their home regions rather than large numbers of away games to keep the travel costs for clubs to a minimum.

Clarence took on North Hobart at Bellerive Oval on 29 August in the First Elimination Final, the Roos were untroubled all day in heavy rain to race away to a convincing 43-point win whilst that night, Devonport Oval staged a night Second Elimination Final between Devonport and Launceston.

Also played in atrocious conditions, the Magpies posted a 35-point half-time lead and kept the Blues goalless, a third quarter rally saw Launceston hit back, but Devonport kept the Blues again goalless in the final quarter to run out convincing 37-point winners to book a date with Clarence.

The First Semi Final between Clarence and Devonport was originally scheduled for Sunday, 6 September at North Hobart, but owing to a week of constant heavy rain in Hobart, North Hobart Oval was closed by the Hobart City Council after junior football had inexplicably been allowed to be played on the ground during torrential rain the previous weekend which turned the ground into a waterlogged quagmire.

Fearing a backlash from the Southern Football League and the Old Scholars Football Association over the condition the ground would be left in after another match at the venue (both competitions had booked the ground to hold their Grand Finals in the coming weeks), AFL Tasmania then at the last minute, controversially switched the date and venue of the match back to the Saturday and moved it to Bellerive Oval as a curtain-raiser to the Glenorchy and Burnie Second Semi Final which prompted extreme outrage from the North West Coast media and the Devonport Football Club over the decision.

This meant that for the first time since 1921, no finals football was staged at North Hobart Oval.

The Roos, playing on their home ground, achieved a 53-point win against Devonport, while in the second match of the afternoon, Glenorchy made its way into the Grand Final by defeating Burnie by 71-points. Burnie and Clarence met in the Preliminary Final at Aurora Stadium on 12 September in better shape.

After an even start, the Dockers began to get on top and eventually opened up a lead of more than four goals in the third quarter before the Roos steadied to reduce the margin to 13-points at three-quarter time.

The Dockers posted what appeared to be a match-winning lead midway through the final quarter before Clarence hit back with a succession of goals late in the game to take the lead.

With only seconds remaining, Burnie's captain-coach Justin Plapp was awarded a free kick 35-metres out, straight in front of goal when the siren sounded.

Plapp's resulting kick after the siren missed to the right and cost his side a grand final spot and sent the Roos into raptures.

The Grand Final on 19 September pitted strong favourites Glenorchy against Clarence, whose only hope seemed to be the fact that the match was being played on their home ground where their record was 10-nil for the season and where they were unbeaten since the opening round of the 2008 SFL Premier League season.

After looking ominous early Glenorchy failed to capitalise on their advantage, the Roos then shocked the Magpies (and the 7,534-strong crowd) by piling on six unanswered goals late in the second quarter in the rain to post a 30-point half-time lead.

Glenorchy hit back late in the third quarter to reduce the deficit to 15-points at three-quarter time, with the Roos kicking with the wind to the Southern Stand end in the final quarter.

After holding firm for much of the quarter, Clarence began to tire, Glenorchy putting enormous pressure on them in the final ten minutes but missed several chances to hit the front before Jeromey Webberley snapped a pivotal 60-metre goal for Clarence against the run of play to give the Roos valuable breathing space as another wave of attacks in the dying minutes from Glenorchy again proved ineffective, with the Roos hanging on to win the premiership by a solitary goal.

For the Roos, it was their sixth TFL/TSL premiership since 1993 and tenth senior flag overall in seventeen seasons including their eight seasons in the SFL Premier League.

As a side note, this was the first season at TFL/TSL level where crowd attendances at roster matches were not released to the public.

AFL Tasmania's reasoning prior to the season was that the competition was about clubs being able to run themselves properly and remain "in profit" rather than concentrating on crowd numbers at this stage.

Although no official roster figures were released, it is generally accepted that although numbers were reasonable early on in the season, crowd attendances nosedived by mid-season with a mix of odd fixturing and poor weather conditions affecting results, however, the Grand Final attendance of 7,534 was still the largest attendance at a domestic club football match in Tasmania since the 1999 TSFL Grand Final.

== 2009 Tasmanian State League Ladder ==
Pos	Team	Pld	W	L	D	PF	PA	PP	Pts
1	Glenorchy	18	14	4	0	1937	1268	152.8	56
2	Burnie Dockers	18	14	4	0	1850	1280	144.5	56
3	Clarence	18	13	5	0	1836	1384	132.7	52
4	Devonport	18	10	8	0	1462	1264	115.7	40
5	Launceston	18	9	9	0	1494	1281	116.6	36
6	North Hobart	18	9	9	0	1584	1585	99.9	36
7	North Launceston	18	8	10	0	1429	1765	81.0	32
8	Hobart	18	6	12	0	1201	1629	73.7	24
9	Lauderdale	18	4	14	0	1113	1608	69.2	16
10	South Launceston	18	3	15	0	1044	1876	55.7	12

=== Season Opener (Part Round 17) ===
(Saturday, 4 April 2009)

- Launceston 14.7 (91) v Glenorchy 10.10 (70) – KGV Football Park

=== Season Opener (Part Round 16) ===
(Saturday, 4 April 2009)

- Nth Launceston 14.9 (93) v Burnie 10.8 (68) – Aurora Stadium (Night)

=== Round 1 ===
(Sunday, 5 April. Friday, 10 April & Saturday, 11 April 2009)

- Lauderdale 12.7 (79) v Sth Launceston 6.10 (46) – Youngtown Memorial Ground (Sunday)
- Glenorchy 19.20 (134) v Hobart 6.6 (42) – TCA Ground (Friday)
- Burnie 13.12 (90) v Devonport 7.12 (54) – West Park Oval
- Nth Launceston 18.9 (117) v Launceston 13.12 (90) – Aurora Stadium (Night)
- Nth Hobart 16.16 (112) v Clarence 14.10 (94) – North Hobart Oval

=== Round 2 ===
(Saturday, 18 April 2009)

- Clarence 21.5 (131) v Glenorchy 13.18 (96) – Bellerive Oval *
- Nth Hobart 11.15 (81) v Lauderdale 11.9 (75) – Lauderdale Sports Ground
- Launceston 17.15 (117) v Hobart 13.6 (84) – Windsor Park
- Burnie 26.6 (162) v Sth Launceston 17.10 (112) – Youngtown Memorial Ground
- Devonport 19.5 (119) v Nth Launceston 7.13 (55) – Devonport Oval (Night)

Note: Clarence wore their heritage strip during this match.

=== Round 3 ===
(Saturday, 25 April & Sunday, 26 April 2009)

- Glenorchy 13.25 (103) v Nth Hobart 8.9 (57) – KGV Football Park
- Hobart 9.8 (62) v Lauderdale 7.15 (57) – Lauderdale Sports Ground
- Nth Launceston 10.15 (75) v Sth Launceston 8.12 (60) – Aurora Stadium (AFL Curtain-Raiser)
- Burnie 16.18 (114) v Clarence 9.13 (67) – West Park Oval (Sunday)
- Devonport 10.19 (79) v Launceston 9.4 (58) – Windsor Park (Sunday)

=== Round 4 ===
(Saturday, 2 May & Sunday, 3 May 2009)

- Burnie 12.21 (93) v Nth Hobart 9.9 (63) – North Hobart Oval
- Launceston 15.6 (96) v Sth Launceston 7.15 (57) – Windsor Park
- Glenorchy 17.12 (114) v Nth Launceston 9.14 (68) – KGV Football Park
- Devonport 17.4 (106) v Lauderdale 10.6 (66) – Devonport Oval (Night)
- Clarence 20.10 (130) v Hobart 10.11 (71) – Richmond Recreation Ground (Sunday)

=== Round 5 ===
(Saturday, 9 May 2009)

- Clarence 8.20 (68) v Launceston 10.7 (67) – Bellerive Oval
- Nth Hobart 13.11 (89) v Hobart 8.10 (58) – TCA Ground
- Devonport 11.15 (81) v Sth Launceston 5.9 (39) – Youngtown Memorial Ground
- Glenorchy 19.16 (130) v Lauderdale 14.7 (91) – Lauderdale Sports Ground
- Burnie 30.20 (200) v Nth Launceston 14.11 (95) – West Park Oval

=== Round 6 ===
(Saturday, 16 May & Sunday, 17 May 2009)

- Burnie 11.14 (80) v Glenorchy 11.12 (78) – KGV Football Park
- Sth Launceston 13.6 (84) v Nth Hobart 12.8 (80) – North Hobart Oval
- Lauderdale 9.7 (61) v Launceston 5.12 (42) – Windsor Park
- Devonport 14.10 (94) v Hobart 6.11 (47) – Devonport Oval (Night)
- Nth Launceston 19.7 (121) v Clarence 14.13 (97) – Aurora Stadium (Sunday)

=== Round 7 ===
(Saturday, 23 May 2009)

- Hobart 17.14 (116) v Sth Launceston 12.9 (81) – TCA Ground
- Glenorchy 20.9 (129) v Nth Hobart 16.9 (105) – KGV Football Park
- Clarence 16.9 (105) v Lauderdale 9.12 (66) – Bellerive Oval
- Nth Launceston 14.10 (94) v Devonport 12.12 (84) – West Park Oval (Double-Header)
- Burnie 12.18 (90) v Launceston 10.18 (78) – West Park Oval (Double-Header – Night)

=== Round 8 ===
(Saturday, 30 May 2009)

- Nth Launceston 12.8 (80) v Lauderdale 9.5 (59) – Bellerive Oval *
- Clarence 18.12 (120) v Nth Hobart 18.7 (115) – North Hobart Oval
- Hobart 14.11 (95) v Glenorchy 13.11 (89) – TCA Ground
- Burnie 24.18 (162) v Sth Launceston 6.9 (45) – Devonport Oval (Double-Header)
- Devonport 13.10 (88) v Launceston 8.9 (57) – Devonport Oval (Double-Header – Night)

Note: North Launceston wore an alternate playing jumper due to a uniform clash with Lauderdale.

=== Round 9 ===
(Saturday, 13 June & Sunday, 14 June 2009)

- Glenorchy 14.17 (101) v Clarence 12.7 (79) – KGV Football Park
- Sth Launceston 13.8 (86) v Devonport 12.13 (85) – Youngtown Memorial Ground
- Launceston 23.9 (147) v Nth Launceston 6.6 (42) – Windsor Park
- Burnie 24.25 (169) v Hobart 7.9 (51) – West Park Oval
- Nth Hobart 14.15 (99) v Lauderdale 8.10 (58) – North Hobart Oval (Sunday)

=== Round 10 ===
(Saturday, 20 June & Sunday, 21 June 2009)

- Clarence 17.14 (116) v Sth Launceston 5.4 (34) – Bellerive Oval
- Lauderdale 13.9 (87) v Hobart 11.18 (84) – Lauderdale Sports Ground
- Glenorchy 22.10 (142) v Nth Launceston 8.8 (56) – Aurora Stadium (Double-Header)
- Nth Hobart 16.13 (109) v Launceston 6.11 (47) – Aurora Stadium (Double-Header – Night)
- Burnie 15.8 (98) v Devonport 14.7 (91) – Devonport Oval (Sunday)

=== Round 11 ===
(Saturday, 27 June & Sunday, 28 June 2009)

- Nth Hobart 17.11 (113) v Devonport 11.12 (78) – North Hobart Oval
- Burnie 17.14 (116) v Nth Launceston 9.9 (63) – West Park Oval
- Glenorchy 21.14 (140) v Lauderdale 4.3 (27) – KGV Football Park
- Sth Launceston 14.10 (94) v Launceston 14.6 (90) – Youngtown Memorial Ground
- Clarence 18.13 (121) v Hobart 11.7 (73) – Snug Park (Sunday)

=== Round 12 ===
(Saturday, 4 July & Sunday, 5 July 2009)

- Nth Launceston 23.10 (148) v Sth Launceston 6.5 (41) – Aurora Stadium
- Hobart 9.5 (59) v Nth Hobart 6.4 (40) – TCA Ground
- Glenorchy 7.7 (49) v Devonport 6.5 (41) – Devonport Oval
- Clarence 10.13 (73) v Lauderdale 5.11 (41) – Lauderdale Sports Ground
- Launceston 15.10 (100) v Burnie 5.9 (39) – Windsor Park (Sunday)

=== Round 13 (Split Round) ===
(Saturday, 11 July & Saturday, 18 July 2009)

- Nth Hobart 17.10 (112) v Lauderdale 12.15 (87) – North Hobart Oval (11 July)
- Burnie 5.11 (41) v Sth Launceston 0.7 (7) – West Park Oval (11 July)
- Launceston 12.14 (86) v Nth Launceston 9.6 (60) – Aurora Stadium (18 July)
- Glenorchy 17.10 (112) v Hobart 9.10 (64) – KGV Football Park (18 July)
- Clarence 17.15 (117) v Devonport 13.7 (85) – Bellerive Oval (18 July)

=== Round 14 ===
(Saturday, 25 July & Sunday, 26 July 2009)

- Clarence 17.16 (118) v Nth Hobart 12.14 (86) – Bellerive Oval
- Burnie 15.12 (102) v Lauderdale 10.15 (75) – Lauderdale Sports Ground
- Glenorchy 20.13 (133) v Sth Launceston 8.15 (63) – Aurora Stadium (Double-Header)
- Launceston 14.11 (95) v Devonport 4.5 (29) – Aurora Stadium (Double-Header – Night)
- Hobart 10.8 (68) v Nth Launceston 6.9 (45) – TCA Ground (Sunday)

=== Round 15 ===
(Saturday, 1 August & Sunday, 2 August 2009)

- Glenorchy 11.8 (74) v Clarence 7.11 (53) – KGV Football Park
- Launceston 13.13 (91) v Sth Launceston 7.5 (47) – Windsor Park
- Lauderdale 4.7 (31) v Hobart 2.10 (22) – TCA Ground
- Nth Hobart 21.11 (137) v Nth Launceston 15.7 (97) – Aurora Stadium (Night)
- Devonport 12.8 (80) v Burnie 7.5 (47) – West Park Oval (Sunday)

=== Round 16 ===
(Saturday, 8 August & Sunday, 9 August 2009)

- Clarence 18.11 (119) v Hobart 7.6 (48) – Bellerive Oval
- Launceston 14.8 (92) v Lauderdale 6.4 (40) – Bellerive Oval (Sunday) *
- Glenorchy 19.12 (126) v Nth Hobart 8.9 (57) – North Hobart Oval (Sunday)
- Devonport 17.16 (118) v Sth Launceston 7.7 (49) – Devonport Oval (Sunday)

Note: Match transferred to Bellerive due to unfit playing surface at Lauderdale.

=== Round 17 ===
(Saturday, 15 August 2009)

- Devonport 10.13 (73) v Hobart 11.4 (70) – TCA Ground
- Clarence 16.15 (111) v Lauderdale 6.9 (45) – Bellerive Oval
- Nth Launceston 12.14 (86) v Sth Launceston 9.10 (64) – Youngtown Memorial Ground
- Nth Hobart 11.12 (78) v Burnie 10.12 (72) – West Park Oval (Night)

=== Round 18 ===
(Saturday, 22 August 2009)

- Hobart 13.9 (87) v Nth Hobart 7.9 (51) – North Hobart Oval
- Devonport 11.7 (73) v Nth Launceston 5.4 (34) – Devonport Oval
- Burnie 17.5 (107) v Launceston 7.8 (50) – Windsor Park
- Glenorchy 17.15 (117) v Lauderdale 10.8 (68) – Lauderdale Sports Ground
- Clarence 16.21 (117) v Sth Launceston 5.5 (35) – Youngtown Memorial Ground

=== First Elimination Final ===
(Saturday, 29 August 2009)

- Clarence: 4.3 (27) | 7.11 (53) | 12.14 (86) | 14.20 (104)
- Nth Hobart: 2.7 (19) | 3.8 (26) | 7.11 (53) | 8.13 (61)
- Attendance: 900 (approx) at Bellerive Oval

=== Second Elimination Final ===
(Saturday, 29 August 2009)

- Devonport: 3.2 (20) | 6.4 (40) | 7.4 (46) | 10.6 (66)
- Launceston 0.3 (3) | 0.5 (5) | 3.9 (27) | 3.11 (29)
- Attendance: 900 (approx) at Devonport Oval (Night)

=== First Semi Final ===
(Saturday, 5 September 2009)

- Clarence: 4.4 (28) | 7.6 (48) | 12.11 (83) | 15.15 (105)
- Devonport: 0.2 (2) | 2.4 (16) | 5.6 (36) | 7.10 (52)
- Attendance: 2,502 at Bellerive Oval (Double-Header)

Note: Match transferred to Bellerive due to unfit playing surface at North Hobart.

=== Second Semi Final ===
(Saturday, 5 September 2009)

- Glenorchy: 8.2 (50) | 15.7 (97) | 21.11 (137) | 25.15 (165)
- Burnie 3.3 (21) | 5.3 (33) | 8.7 (55) | 14.10 (94)
- Attendance: 2,502 at Bellerive Oval (Double-Header)

=== Preliminary Final ===
(Saturday, 12 September 2009)

- Clarence: 4.1 (25) | 6.4 (40) | 10.6 (66) | 16.7 (103)
- Burnie 2.3 (15) | 9.6 (60) | 12.7 (79) | 15.10 (100)
- Attendance: 1,027 at Aurora Stadium

=== Grand Final ===
2009 TSL Grand Final
Saturday 19 September	Glenorchy Magpies	def. by	Clarence Roos	Bellerive Oval (crowd: 7534)
4.4 (28); 4.6 (30); 11.7 (73); 14.11 (95)	Q1; Q2; Q3; Final	3.3 (21); 9.6 (60); 13.10 (88); 15.11 (101)
