= 1945 TANFL season =

Australian rules football season

- Teams: Hobart Tigers; New Town Magpies; North Hobart Redlegs; Sandy Bay Seagulls
- Premiers: North Hobart
- Minor premiers: North Hobart

Attendance
- Matches played: 34
- Total attendance: 53,207 (1,565 per match)

The 1945 Tasmanian Australian National Football League (TANFL) premiership season was an Australian Rules football competition staged in Hobart, Tasmania over fifteen (15) roster rounds and four (4) finals series matches between 5 May and 29 September 1945.

This was the first season of post-World War Two football and much work was undertaken by officials, members, supporters and players in re-establishing the competition after it was closed down at the end of the 1941 season due to the War.

This was also the first season of a new district-based competition, with four clubs – North Hobart, New Town, Hobart and Sandy Bay – competing and players selected on residential qualification.

== District football ==
Senior football in Hobart had ceased after the 1941 season during the height of World War II. Throughout 1944, a committee within the TANFL worked towards resuming football in 1945 and adopting a district system, with each club representing a district and local players automatically tied to a club based on residential address. In September, the committee recommended the division of metropolitan Hobart into four districts – North Hobart, Hobart, Sandy Bay and New Town – each with a roughly equal adult population, and that the new district competition be formed from one club in each district. As part of the plan, each club would require a venue within its district where it played its home matches; since the mid 1930s, all matches had been played on either the TCA Ground or North Hobart Oval as effectively neutral venues. A new constitution covering the scheme was adopted in November.

The district clubs were formed over the following months. Strictly speaking, all four district clubs were newly formed; but the New Town and North Hobart clubs are considered de facto continuations of the pre-district clubs of the same names. Sandy Bay was the first club to form, on 20 November, adopting royal blue and white colours; New Town formed on 29 November, adopting black and white colours in place of the green and gold worn by its pre-district counterpart; North Hobart formed on 5 December, retaining the navy blue and red of its predecessor; and Hobart formed on 19 December, adopting the black and gold colours of the pre-district Cananore Football Club, and now considered its spiritual successor.

As part of developing the district scheme, the outer districts of New Norfolk, Clarence and Huon were invited to put themselves forward for consideration as districts; New Norfolk and Clarence applied, Huon did not. The new constitution created the New Norfolk and Clarence districts, but did not allow for clubs in those districts to join until 1947.

== Participating clubs ==
- Hobart Football Club
- New Town Football Club
- North Hobart Football Club
- Sandy Bay Football Club

=== 1945 TANFL Club Coaches ===
- Cecil Geappen (Hobart)
- C W Pettiona (New Town)
- Jack Metherall (North Hobart)
- Jack Rogers (Sandy Bay)

=== TANFL Reserves Grand Final ===
- No Reserves competition.

=== TANFL Under-19's Grand Final ===
State Schools Old Boys Football Association (SSOBFA)

- Macalburn 5.5 (35) v South East 2.9 (21) – New Town Oval

Note: Macalburn were affiliated to Hobart, South East were affiliated to Sandy Bay.

=== State Grand Final ===
(Saturday, 6 October 1945)

- Nth Hobart: 2.0 (12) | 5.3 (33) | 6.6 (42) | 12.12 (84)
- Launceston: 5.6 (36) | 7.7 (49) | 11.10 (76) | 11.11 (77)
- Attendance: 5,000 at York Park

=== Intrastate Matches ===
Jubilee Shield (Saturday, 9 June 1945)

- TANFL 17.14 (116) v NTFA 17.11 (113) – Att: 6,000 at North Hobart Oval

Jubilee Shield (Saturday, 14 July 1945)

- NTFA 19.16 (130) v TANFL 17.15 (117) – Att: 9,000 at York Park

Jubilee Shield (Saturday, 18 August 1945)

- NWFU 24.19 (163) v TANFL 16.14 (110) – Att: 6,000 at West Park Oval

=== Leading Goalkickers: TANFL ===
- E.Collis (North Hobart) – 54

=== Medal winners ===
- Noel Reid (North Hobart) – William Leitch Medal
- Max Walker (Macalburn) – V.A Geard Medal (Under-19's)

== 1945 TANFL Ladder ==
Pos	Team	Pld	W	L	D	PF	PA	PP	Pts
1	North Hobart	15	13	2	0	1481	1013	146.2	52
2	Sandy Bay	15	8	6	1	1219	1118	109.0	34
3	New Town	15	8	6	1	1201	1111	108.1	34
4	Hobart	15	0	15	0	807	1466	55.0	0

Starting from this year, all roster matches earned four premiership points for a win and two for a draw. This ended the practice of awarding more premiership points for a win in the latter half of the season than in the former half, which had been in place since 1907. Finals were still played under a three-team system with challenge, and the right of challenge in the finals now went to the minor premier based on premiership points), rather than the club with the most wins.

=== Round 1 ===
(Saturday, 5 May 1945)

- New Town 11.14 (80) v Hobart 7.10 (52) – Att: 1,000 at North Hobart Oval
- Nth Hobart 15.5 (95) v Sandy Bay 11.14 (80) – Att: 1,500 at Queenborough Oval

=== Round 2 ===
(Saturday, 12 May 1945)

- Nth Hobart 26.18 (174) v Hobart 7.9 (51) – Att: 800 at North Hobart Oval
- Sandy Bay 14.13 (97) v New Town 10.11 (71) – Att: 651 at New Town Oval

=== Round 3 ===
(Saturday, 19 May 1945)

- Nth Hobart 11.13 (79) v New Town 9.11 (65) – Att: 1,453 at North Hobart Oval
- Sandy Bay 9.11 (65) v Hobart 9.7 (61) – Att: 600 at Queenborough Oval

=== Round 4 ===
(Saturday, 26 May 1945)

- Nth Hobart 12.18 (90) v Sandy Bay 7.13 (55) – Att: 1,689 at North Hobart Oval
- New Town 8.12 (60) v Hobart 5.15 (45) – Att: 520 at New Town Oval

=== Round 5 ===
(Saturday, 2 June 1945)

- Nth Hobart 18.16 (124) v Hobart 8.3 (51) – Att: 900 at North Hobart Oval
- Sandy Bay 10.8 (68) v New Town 10.8 (68) – Att: 1,400 at Queenborough Oval

=== Round 6 ===
(Saturday, 16 June & Monday, 18 June 1945)

- Nth Hobart 14.13 (97) v New Town 4.11 (35) – Att: 2,000 at North Hobart Oval
- Sandy Bay 8.19 (67) v Hobart 7.11 (53) – Att: 1,990 at North Hobart Oval (Monday)

=== Round 7 ===
(Saturday, 23 June 1945)

- New Town 9.9 (63) v Hobart 4.17 (41) – Att: 1,285 at North Hobart Oval
- Nth Hobart 14.17 (101) v Sandy Bay 11.13 (79) – Att: 1,492 at Queenborough Oval

=== Round 8 ===
(Monday, 30 June 1945)

- Nth Hobart 8.12 (60) v Hobart 8.8 (56) – Att: 1,000 at North Hobart Oval
- Sandy Bay 13.8 (86) v New Town 9.24 (78) – Att: 1,500 at New Town Oval

=== Round 9 ===
(Saturday, 7 July 1945)

- Sandy Bay 14.9 (93) v Hobart 10.11 (71) – Att: 1,010 at North Hobart Oval
- New Town 16.16 (112) v Nth Hobart 6.13 (49) – Att: 1,000 at New Town Oval

=== Round 10 ===
(Saturday, 21 July 1945)

- Nth Hobart 14.22 (106) v Sandy Bay 14.9 (93) – Att: 1,700 at North Hobart Oval
- New Town 20.20 (140) v Hobart 8.13 (61) – Att: 600 at New Town Oval

=== Round 11 ===
(Saturday, 28 July 1945)

- Nth Hobart 22.24 (156) v Hobart 5.8 (38) – Att: 593 at North Hobart Oval
- New Town 11.12 (78) v Sandy Bay 10.9 (69) – Att: 1,800 at Queenborough Oval

=== Round 12 ===
(Saturday, 4 August 1945)

- Nth Hobart 16.19 (115) v New Town 12.11 (83) – Att: 2,000 at North Hobart Oval
- Sandy Bay 21.16 (142) v Hobart 8.10 (58) – Att: 500 at Queenborough Oval

=== Round 13 ===
(Saturday, 11 August 1945)

- New Town 14.14 (98) v Hobart 13.6 (84) – Att: 600 at North Hobart Oval
- Sandy Bay 10.18 (78) v Nth Hobart 10.10 (70) – Att: 1,400 at Queenborough Oval

=== Round 14 ===
(Saturday, 25 August 1945)

- Nth Hobart 12.9 (81) v Hobart 9.8 (62) – Att: 598 at North Hobart Oval
- New Town 15.5 (95) v Sandy Bay 11.18 (84) – Att: 1,015 at New Town Oval

=== Round 15 ===
(Saturday, 1 September 1945)

- Sandy Bay 8.15 (63) v Hobart 3.5 (23) – Att: 620 at North Hobart Oval
- Nth Hobart 11.18 (84) v New Town 11.9 (75) – Att: 1,000 at New Town Oval

=== Semi-final ===
(Saturday, 8 September 1945)

- Sandy Bay: 3.3 (21) | 5.4 (34) | 8.7 (55) | 9.10 (64)
- New Town: 0.2 (2) | 2.6 (18) | 4.7 (31) | 9.10 (64)
- Attendance: 3,040 at North Hobart Oval

=== Semi-final Replay ===
(Saturday, 15 September 1945)

- Sandy Bay: 3.4 (22) | 7.11 (53) | 10.14 (74) | 12.18 (90)
- New Town: 4.2 (26) | 4.4 (28) | 5.5 (35) | 6.9 (45)
- Attendance: 4,960 at North Hobart Oval

=== Final ===
(Saturday, 22 September 1945)

- Sandy Bay: 1.9 (15) | 1.11 (17) | 4.13 (37) | 7.14 (56)
- Nth Hobart: 2.2 (14) | 3.4 (22) | 4.6 (30) | 5.7 (37)
- Attendance: 5,011 at North Hobart Oval

=== Grand Final ===
(Saturday, 29 September 1945)

- Nth Hobart: 4.1 (25) | 5.7 (37) | 6.13 (49) | 10.17 (77)
- Sandy Bay: 4.1 (25) | 4.2 (26) | 7.3 (45) | 7.6 (48)
- Attendance: 5,980 at North Hobart Oval
