= 2000 SWL season =

- Teams: 6
- Premiers: Clarence
- Minor premiers: Northern Bombers; 7th minor premiership

Attendance
- Matches played: 55
- Total attendance: 73,042 (1,328 per match)

The 2000 SWL season was the 116th season of the Statewide League (SWL), the highest-level senior Australian rules football competition in Tasmania. This was the first and only season under the SWL name, replacing the Tasmanian State Football League (TSL) name that had been used during the 1999 season. The season began on 24 March and concluded on 9 September, comprising an 17-match home-and-away season, followed by a four-week finals series.

The SWL was sponsored to the tune of A$750,000 under a funding agreement with the Australian Football League which was overseen and managed by the sport's governing body in the state (Football Tasmania) to control.

Shortly after the season had been completed, Burnie Dockers announced that they would be leaving the competition to rejoin the NTFL in 2001, a short time later both Northern Bombers and Devonport followed suit leaving an unsustainable three club statewide competition, with Football Tasmania also under considerable pressure from both the Hobart City Council over possible legal action against them for breaking a contract by moving the Grand Final away from North Hobart Oval to York Park this season and looming legal threats by the remaining SWL clubs over a restraint of trade, the statewide competition was abandoned by Football Tasmania in January 2001, the remaining clubs resumed playing league matches in their regional areas in both the SFL and the NTFL until the end of the 2008 season.

== Participating Clubs ==
- Burnie Dockers Football Club
- Clarence District Football Club
- Devonport Power Football Club
- Glenorchy District Football Club
- Hobart Demons Football Club
- Northern Bombers Football Club

=== 2000 SWL Club Coaches ===
- Mick McGuane (Burnie Dockers)
- Grant Fagan (Clarence)
- Dale Perry (Devonport Power)
- Shayne Stevenson (Glenorchy)
- Darren Trevena (Hobart Demons)
- Garry McIntosh (Northern Bombers)

=== SWL Under-21s Grand Final ===
- Clarence 9.13 (67) v Northern Bombers 8.14 (62) – York Park

=== SWL Under-18s Grand Final ===
- Glenorchy (A) 13.9 (87) v Hobart Demons (B) 4.3 (27) – York Park

=== Leading Goalkickers: SWL ===
- Scott Allen (Clarence) – 80

=== Medal Winners ===
- Nathan Howard (Northern Bombers) – William Leitch Medal
- Scott Allen (Clarence) – Darrel Baldock Medal (Best player in SWL Grand Final)
- Justin Cotton (Northern Bombers) & Heath Fox (Northern Bombers) – George Watt Medal (U-21s)
- Jamie Walker (Glenorchy) – V.A Geard Medal (Under-18s)

=== Intrastate Matches ===
Intrastate Match (Saturday, 10 June 2000)

- South 16.13 (109) v North 9.9 (63) – Att: 2,302 at York Park

=== 2000 SWL Ladder ===
Pos	Team	Pld	W	L	D	PF	PA	PP	Pts
1	Northern Bombers	17	15	2	0	1632	928	175.9	60
2	Clarence	17	13	4	0	1976	1062	186.1	52
3	Burnie Dockers	17	10	7	0	1462	1026	142.5	40
4	Hobart Demons	17	8	9	0	1333	1646	81.0	32
5	Glenorchy	17	5	12	0	1459	1572	92.8	20
6	Devonport Power	17	0	17	0	684	2199	31.1	0

=== Round 1 ===
(Friday, 24 March & Saturday, 1 April 2000)

- Hobart Demons 5.12 (42) d Clarence 3.13 (31) – Att: 1,628 at North Hobart Oval (Friday Night)
- Northern Bombers 17.10 (112) d Glenorchy 13.18 (96) – Att: 1,343 at KGV Oval (Saturday)
- Burnie Dockers 14.20 (104) d Devonport 1.4 (10) – Att: 1,930 at West Park Oval (Saturday)

=== Round 2 ===
(Saturday, 8 April 2000)

- Northern Bombers 21.10 (136) v Hobart Demons 7.10 (52) – Att: 929 at North Hobart Oval
- Clarence 15.13 (103) v Burnie Dockers 12.5 (77) – Att: 1,067 at Bellerive Oval
- Glenorchy 28.19 (187) v Devonport 5.6 (36) – Att: 636 at Devonport Oval

=== Round 3 ===
(Saturday, 15 April & Sunday, 16 April 2000)

- Clarence 20.10 (130) v Glenorchy 14.15 (99) – Att: 1,418 at Bellerive Oval
- Burnie Dockers 13.7 (85) v Hobart Demons 5.13 (43) – Att: 1,215 at West Park Oval (Night)
- Northern Bombers 19.22 (136) v Devonport 2.4 (16) – Att: 804 at Devonport Oval (Sunday)

=== Round 4 ===
(Saturday, 29 April & Sunday, 30 April 2000)

- Clarence 21.13 (139) v Hobart Demons 7.8 (50) – Att: 1,056 at North Hobart Oval
- Northern Bombers 10.12 (72) v Glenorchy 6.4 (40) – Att: 1,184 at KGV Football Park
- Burnie Dockers 22.17 (149) v Devonport 4.12 (36) – Att: 1,035 at West Park Oval (Sunday)

=== Round 5 ===
(Saturday, 6 May & Sunday, 7 May 2000)

- Hobart Demons 23.10 (148) v Devonport 8.9 (57) – Att: 633 at North Hobart Oval
- Burnie Dockers 13.12 (90) v Glenorchy 9.12 (66) – Att: 869 at KGV Football Park
- Clarence 19.12 (126) v Northern Bombers 8.15 (63) – Att: 1,406 at Bellerive Oval (Sunday)

=== Round 6 ===
(Saturday, 13 May & Sunday, 14 May 2000)

- Glenorchy 15.17 (107) v Hobart Demons 8.6 (54) – Att: 1,274 at KGV Football Park
- Clarence 17.14 (116) v Devonport 6.3 (39) – Att: 614 at Devonport Oval
- Northern Bombers 11.11 (77) v Burnie Dockers 5.14 (44) – Att: 1,010 at West Park Oval (Sunday)

=== Round 7 ===
(Saturday, 20 May & Sunday, 21 May 2000)

- Hobart Demons 20.12 (132) v Burnie Dockers 13.6 (84) – Att: 703 at North Hobart Oval
- Glenorchy 13.20 (98) v Devonport 5.11 (41) – Att: 675 at Devonport Oval
- Northern Bombers 14.14 (98) v Clarence 13.7 (85) – Att: 3,417 at York Park (Sunday)

=== Round 8 ===
(Saturday, 27 May & Sunday, 23 July 2000)

- Clarence 18.18 (126) v Hobart Demons 9.10 (64) – Att: 1,053 at Bellerive Oval
- Northern Bombers 18.10 (118) v Glenorchy 10.10 (70) – Att: 1,108 at York Park
- Burnie Dockers 15.16 (106) v Devonport 4.9 (33) – Att: 1,026 at Devonport Oval (Sunday, 23 July) *

Note: This match was moved forward to be played on 23 July on the weekend of Round 14 for unspecified reasons.

=== Round 9 ===
(Saturday, 3 June 2000)

- Hobart Demons 15.11 (101) v Glenorchy 14.7 (91) – Att: 985 at KGV Football Park
- Northern Bombers 18.15 (123) v Devonport 10.7 (67) – Att: 521 at Devonport Oval
- Burnie Dockers 14.15 (99) v Clarence 5.14 (44) – Att: 1,075 at West Park Oval

=== Round 10 ===
(Saturday, 17 June 2000)

- Clarence 15.15 (105) v Glenorchy 9.9 (63) – Att: 1,139 at Bellerive Oval
- Northern Bombers 14.20 (104) v Burnie Dockers 4.8 (32) – Att: 1,169 at York Park
- Hobart Demons 22.13 (145) v Devonport 8.10 (58) – Att: 641 at Devonport Oval

=== Round 11 ===
(Saturday, 24 June 2000)

- Hobart Demons 9.24 (78) v Glenorchy 10.10 (70) – Att: 892 at North Hobart Oval
- Clarence 34.9 (213) v Devonport 7.8 (50) – Att: 613 at Bellerive Oval
- Northern Bombers 12.15 (87) v Burnie Dockers 6.11 (47) – Att: 1,039 at West Park Oval

=== Round 12 ===
(Saturday, 1 July 2000)

- Clarence 21.19 (145) v Glenorchy 5.13 (43) – Att: 998 at KGV Football Park
- Northern Bombers 20.17 (137) v Hobart Demons 6.9 (45) – Att: 854 at York Park
- Burnie Dockers 23.14 (152) v Devonport 6.4 (40) – Att: 766 at Devonport Oval

=== Round 13 ===
(Saturday, 8 July 2000)

- Hobart Demons 17.15 (117) v Devonport 10.5 (65) – Att: 515 at North Hobart Oval
- Northern Bombers 15.9 (99) v Clarence 11.7 (73) – Att: 1,039 at York Park
- Burnie Dockers 25.15 (165) v Glenorchy 7.8 (50) – Att: 774 at West Park Oval

=== Round 14 ===
(Saturday, 15 July, Sunday, 16 July & Saturday, 22 July 2000)

- Glenorchy 24.16 (160) v Devonport 5.6 (36) – Att: 904 at KGV Football Park (15 July)
- Burnie Dockers 17.11 (113) v Hobart Demons 8.13 (61) – Att: 562 at North Hobart Oval (16 July)
- Clarence 12.8 (80) v Northern Bombers 6.10 (46) – Att: 5,625 at York Park (22 July – Night) *

Note: This match set the all-time Statewide League attendance record.

=== Round 15 ===
(Saturday, 29 July & Sunday 30 July 2000)

- Glenorchy 12.18 (90) v Hobart Demons 11.5 (71) – Att: 1,002 at North Hobart Oval
- Clarence 21.9 (135) v Burnie Dockers 7.8 (50) – Att: 1,205 at West Park Oval
- Northern Bombers 29.14 (188) v Devonport 6.10 (46) – Att: 1,552 at York Park (Sunday)

=== Round 16 ===
(Saturday, 5 August 2000)

- Clarence 32.17 (209) v Hobart Demons 3.8 (26) – Att: 1,210 at Bellerive Oval
- Burnie Dockers 15.12 (102) v Devonport 6.6 (42) – Att: 809 at West Park Oval
- Northern Bombers 17.10 (112) v Glenorchy 10.15 (75) – Att: 2,210 at York Park (Night)

=== Round 17 ===
(Saturday, 12 August 2000)

- Clarence 17.14 (116) v Glenorchy 8.6 (54) – Att: 876 at KGV Football Park
- Hobart Demons 15.14 (104) v Devonport 6.12 (48) – Att: 459 at Devonport Oval
- Northern Bombers 14.11 (95) v Burnie Dockers 7.5 (47) – Att: 3,165 at York Park (Night)

=== First Semi Final ===
(Saturday, 19 August 2000)

- Hobart Demons: 1.3 (9) | 6.7 (43) | 9.8 (62) | 17.9 (111)
- Burnie Dockers: 6.4 (40) | 7.6 (48) | 10.7 (67) | 11.9 (75)
- Attendance: 1,037 at West Park Oval

=== Second Semi Final ===
(Saturday, 26 August 2000)

- Clarence: 4.1 (25) | 10.5 (65) | 17.10 (112) | 21.10 (136)
- Northern Bombers: 3.3 (21) | 5.6 (36) | 9.7 (61) | 14.10 (94)
- Attendance: 3,669 at York Park

=== Preliminary Final ===
(Sunday, 2 September 2000)

- Northern Bombers: 3.7 (25) | 8.8 (56) | 14.12 (96) | 21.17 (143)
- Hobart Demons: 4.1 (25) | 8.2 (50) | 10.2 (62) | 11.2 (68)
- Attendance: 1,580 at North Hobart Oval

=== Grand Final ===
(Sunday, 9 September 2000)

- Clarence: 4.0 (24) | 6.6 (42) | 8.13 (61) | 15.15 (105)
- Northern Bombers: 1.4 (10) | 2.7 (19) | 4.7 (31) | 8.8 (56)
- Attendance: 6,124 at York Park

Source: All scores and statistics courtesy of the Hobart Mercury, Launceston Examiner and North West Advocate publications.
