= Thomas Couch =

Thomas Couch may refer to:

- Tom Couch, Australian football player
- Thomas Couch, American professional wrestler known as Tommy Rogers
