= 1949 TANFL season =

Australian rules football season

- Teams: Clarence Kangaroos; Hobart Tigers; New Norfolk Eagles; New Town Magpies; North Hobart Redlegs; Sandy Bay Seagulls
- Premiers: New Town
- Minor premiers: Hobart; 1st minor premiership

Attendance
- Matches played: 49
- Total attendance: 158,834 (3,242 per match)

The 1949 Tasmanian Australian National Football League (TANFL) premiership season was an Australian Rules football competition staged in Hobart, Tasmania over fifteen (15) roster rounds and four (4) finals series matches between 30 April and 24 September 1949.

Following their initial two-year probationary periods of competition, the two country clubs (Clarence and New Norfolk) were retained in the league with assurances that they would not be excluded for at least a further two years, and under a modified conditions which included improved financial support – specifically, receiving for the first time a share of payments from common league profits – but still unequal conditions compared with the four city clubs.

== Participating Clubs ==
- Clarence District Football Club
- Hobart Football Club
- New Norfolk District Football Club
- New Town District Football Club
- North Hobart Football Club
- Sandy Bay Football Club

=== 1949 TANFL Club Coaches ===
- Bert Edwards (Clarence)
- Cecil Geappen (Hobart)
- Albert 'Tich' Edwards (New Norfolk)
- Roy Cazaly (New Town)
- Roy Quinn (North Hobart)
- Ernie Pilkington (Sandy Bay)

=== TANFL Reserves Grand Final ===
- Nth Hobart 8.11 (59) v Hobart 6.7 (43) – North Hobart Oval

=== TANFL Under-19's Grand Final ===
State Schools Old Boys Football Association (SSOBFA) – (Saturday, 10 September 1949)

- Buckingham 13.15 (93) v North West 1.5 (11) – New Town Oval.

Note: Buckingham were affiliated to New Town, North West were affiliated to North Hobart.

=== State Grand Final ===
(Saturday, 1 October 1949)

- Nth Launceston: 4.4 (28) | 5.8 (38) | 7.11 (53) | 13.17 (95)
- New Town: 1.2 (8) | 3.4 (22) | 7.6 (48) | 8.7 (55)
- Attendance: 8,407 at York Park

Note: More than 2,500 patrons also entered the ground without paying, swelling the crowd to more than 11,000.

=== Intrastate Matches ===
Jubilee Shield (Saturday, 28 May 1949)

- NTFA 19.5 (119) v TANFL 11.16 (82) – Att: 11,000 at York Park

Jubilee Shield (Saturday, 2 July 1949)

- NWFU 13.13 (91) v TANFL 11.14 (80) – Att: 6,500 at Devonport Oval

Jubilee Shield (Saturday, 6 August 1949)

- NTFA 16.12 (108) v TANFL 13.12 (90) – Att: 11,284 at North Hobart Oval

Inter-Association Match (Saturday, 28 May 1949)

- TANFL 15.22 (112) v Huon FA 7.10 (52) – Att: 1,300 at Huonville Recreation Ground

=== Interstate Match ===
Exhibition Match (Saturday, 2 July 1949)

- Claremont 17.17 (119) v TANFL 14.12 (96) – Att: 2,988 at North Hobart Oval

=== Leading Goalkickers: TANFL ===
- Albert Park (New Town) – 69
- B.Reading (Hobart) – 34
- Bobby Parsons (New Town) – 31
- Noel Reid (Nth Hobart) – 29

=== Medal Winners ===
- Hamish Yaxley (Clarence) – William Leitch Medal
- Rex Garwood (Buckingham) – V.A Geard Medal (Under-19's)

== 1949 TANFL Ladder ==
Pos	Team	Pld	W	L	D	PF	PA	PP	Pts
1	Hobart	15	14	1	0	1126	891	126.4	56
2	New Town	15	11	4	0	1336	979	136.5	44
3	New Norfolk	15	8	7	0	1053	1010	104.3	32
4	North Hobart	15	7	8	0	1083	1073	100.9	28
5	Sandy Bay	15	4	11	0	979	1189	82.3	16
6	Clarence	15	1	14	0	835	1270	65.7	4

=== Round 1 ===
(Saturday, 30 April 1949)

- Hobart 7.14 (56) v New Town 7.11 (53) – Att: 4,880 at North Hobart Oval
- Nth Hobart 13.13 (91) v Sandy Bay 12.8 (80) – Att: 2,451 at Queenborough Oval
- New Norfolk 11.9 (75) v Clarence 9.13 (67) – Att: 1,100 at Bellerive Oval

=== Round 2 ===
(Saturday, 7 May 1949)

- New Norfolk 13.17 (95) v Sandy Bay 10.14 (74) – Att: 2,579 at North Hobart Oval
- Nth Hobart 21.9 (135) v New Town 7.15 (57) – Att: 2,560 at New Town Oval
- Hobart 10.16 (76) v Clarence 5.13 (43) – Att: 1,323 at TCA Ground

=== Round 3 ===
(Saturday, 14 May 1949)

- Nth Hobart 10.14 (74) v Clarence 10.8 (68) – Att: 2,910 at North Hobart Oval
- New Town 14.11 (95) v Sandy Bay 10.12 (72) – Att: 2,560 at New Town Oval
- New Norfolk 10.6 (66) v Hobart 4.11 (35) – Att: 2,577 at Boyer Oval

=== Round 4 ===
(Saturday, 21 May 1949)

- Hobart 14.8 (92) v Nth Hobart 10.15 (75) – Att: 4,810 at North Hobart Oval
- New Town 14.17 (101) v New Norfolk 7.14 (56) – Att: 3,318 at New Town Oval
- Sandy Bay 10.23 (83) v Clarence 6.10 (46) – Att: 1,767 at Bellerive Oval

=== Round 5 ===
(Saturday, 4 June 1949)

- New Town 10.19 (79) v Clarence 5.9 (39) – Att: 2,453 at North Hobart Oval
- Hobart 10.19 (79) v Sandy Bay 7.18 (60) – Att: 2,609 at TCA Ground
- New Norfolk 6.10 (46) v Nth Hobart 6.4 (40) – Att: 2,102 at Boyer Oval

=== Round 6 ===
(Saturday, 11 June & Monday, 13 June 1949)

- Nth Hobart 7.9 (51) v Sandy Bay 4.14 (38) – Att: 5,096 at North Hobart Oval
- New Norfolk 9.13 (67) v Clarence 5.6 (36) – Att: 1,285 at Boyer Oval
- Hobart 12.19 (91) v New Town 11.9 (75) – Att: 8,760 at North Hobart Oval (Monday) *

Note: All-time record roster match attendance for Hobart Football Club.

=== Round 7 ===
(Saturday, 18 June 1949)

- New Town 15.10 (100) v Nth Hobart 6.8 (44) – Att: 4,954 at North Hobart Oval
- Hobart 11.18 (84) v Clarence 9.10 (64) – Att: 1,123 at Bellerive Oval
- Sandy Bay 9.10 (64) v New Norfolk 5.10 (40) – Att: 2,227 at Queenborough Oval

=== Round 8 ===
(Saturday, 25 June 1949)

- Hobart 12.12 (84) v New Norfolk 5.7 (37) – Att: 3,370 at North Hobart Oval
- New Town 15.21 (111) v Sandy Bay 7.14 (56) – Att: 3,157 at New Town Oval
- Nth Hobart 17.15 (117) v Clarence 6.16 (52) – Att: 1,083 at TCA Ground

=== Round 9 ===
(Saturday, 9 July 1949)

- New Town 18.11 (119) v New Norfolk 10.9 (69) – Att: 2,720 at North Hobart Oval
- Hobart 9.15 (69) v Nth Hobart 9.14 (68) – Att: 2,701 at TCA Ground
- Sandy Bay 10.13 (73) v Clarence 10.6 (66) – Att: 1,206 at Queenborough Oval

=== Round 10 ===
(Saturday, 16 July 1949)

- Nth Hobart 11.11 (77) v New Norfolk 10.9 (69) – Att: 3,057 at North Hobart Oval
- Hobart 8.10 (58) v Sandy Bay 7.7 (49) – Att: 2,620 at Queenborough Oval
- New Town 17.16 (118) v Clarence 7.13 (55) – Att: 1,236 at Bellerive Oval

=== Round 11 ===
(Saturday, 23 July 1949)

- Nth Hobart 11.10 (76) v Sandy Bay 9.10 (64) – Att: 2,586 at North Hobart Oval
- Hobart 12.8 (80) v New Town 5.24 (54) – Att: 4,166 at TCA Ground
- New Norfolk 13.14 (92) v Clarence 11.8 (74) – Att: 917 at Bellerive Oval

=== Round 12 ===
(Saturday, 30 July 1949)

- Hobart 12.12 (84) v Clarence 9.10 (64) – Att: 1,654 at North Hobart Oval
- New Town 15.18 (108) v Nth Hobart 11.10 (76) – Att: 4,003 at New Town Oval
- New Norfolk 22.11 (143) v Sandy Bay 10.9 (69) – Att: 1,710 at Boyer Oval

=== Round 13 ===
(Saturday, 13 August 1949)

- New Town 15.17 (107) v Sandy Bay 8.12 (60) – Att: 2,797 at North Hobart Oval
- Hobart 11.13 (79) v New Norfolk 9.17 (71) – Att: 2,462 at TCA Ground
- Clarence 9.7 (61) v Nth Hobart 8.12 (60) – Att: 1,152 at Bellerive Oval

=== Round 14 ===
(Saturday, 20 August 1949)

- Hobart 14.12 (96) v Nth Hobart 7.11 (53) – Att: 2,943 at North Hobart Oval
- Sandy Bay 11.18 (84) v Clarence 10.8 (68) – Att: 800 at TCA Ground
- New Town 8.7 (55) v New Norfolk 8.0 (48) – Att: 1,794 at Boyer Oval

=== Round 15 ===
(Saturday, 27 August 1949)

- Hobart 9.9 (63) v Sandy Bay 7.11 (53) – Att: 2,535 at North Hobart Oval
- New Town 14.20 (104) v Clarence 6.6 (42) – Att: 1,442 at New Town Oval
- New Norfolk 10.13 (73) v Nth Hobart 6.10 (46) – Att: 1,407 at Boyer Oval

=== First Semi Final ===
(Saturday, 3 September 1949)

- Nth Hobart: 4.4 (28) | 10.6 (66) | 10.9 (69) | 11.14 (80)
- New Norfolk: 2.7 (19) | 5.10 (40) | 8.12 (60) | 10.16 (76)
- Attendance: 7,386 at North Hobart Oval

=== Second Semi Final ===
(Saturday, 10 September 1949)

- New Town: 2.5 (17) | 3.6 (24) | 6.6 (42) | 11.12 (78)
- Hobart: 2.4 (16) | 5.6 (36) | 8.10 (58) | 9.12 (66)
- Attendance: 8,504 at North Hobart Oval

=== Preliminary Final ===
(Saturday, 17 September 1949)

- Hobart: 2.3 (15) | 9.8 (62) | 11.10 (76) | 16.11 (107)
- Nth Hobart: 1.4 (10) | 4.5 (29) | 7.10 (52) | 8.15 (63)
- Attendance: 10,736 at North Hobart Oval

=== Grand Final ===
(Saturday, 24 September 1949)

- New Town: 2.1 (13) | 5.2 (32) | 6.4 (40) | 10.8 (68)
- Hobart: 1.2 (8) | 2.6 (18) | 2.10 (22) | 4.12 (36)
- Attendance: 15,086 at North Hobart Oval
