= 1957 TANFL season =

Australian rules football season

- Teams: Clarence Kangaroos; Glenorchy Magpies; Hobart Tigers; New Norfolk Eagles; North Hobart Robins; Sandy Bay Seagulls
- Premiers: Nth Hobart
- Minor premiers: Glenorchy

Attendance
- Matches played: 58
- Total attendance: 219,194 (3,779 per match)

The 1957 Tasmanian Australian National Football League (TANFL) premiership season was an Australian Rules football competition staged in Hobart, Tasmania over eighteen (18) roster rounds and four (4) finals series matches between 13 April and 28 September 1957.

New Town District Football Club relocated from the New Town Oval to the King George V Memorial Ground (KGV Oval) in Glenorchy from this season and absorbed the already existing Glenorchy Rovers club that was participating in the Southern District Football Association at that time. The name change to the Glenorchy District Football Club, as well as a redrawing of several district boundaries to accommodate the move, was approved by the TANFL on 8 April 1957.

The King George V Memorial Park was extensively renovated and opened for use for TANFL football on 4 May by Glenorchy Municipal Council Warden, Mr J.E Percey and by Mr Eric O'Brien, the oldest surviving player from the Glenorchy Rovers team of 1886.

== Participating Clubs ==
- Clarence District Football Club
- Glenorchy District Football Club
- Hobart Football Club
- New Norfolk District Football Club
- North Hobart Football Club
- Sandy Bay Football Club

=== 1957 TANFL Club Coaches ===
- Stuart Spencer (Clarence)
- Jack Rough (Glenorchy)
- Bill Williams (Hobart)
- Rex Garwood (New Norfolk)
- John Leedham (North Hobart)
- Gordon Bowman (Sandy Bay)

=== TANFL Reserves Grand Final ===
- Glenorchy 10.19 (79) v Nth Hobart 5.11 (41) – North Hobart Oval

=== TANFL Under-19's Grand Final ===
State Schools Old Boys Football Association (SSOBFA)

- Glenorchy 9.11 (65) v Macalburn 9.4 (58) – New Town Oval

=== State Grand Final ===
(Saturday, 5 October 1957)

- Longford: 3.8 (26) | 5.11 (41) | 10.13 (73) | 14.16 (100)
- Nth Hobart: 0.1 (1) | 7.4 (46) | 10.5 (65) | 12.7 (79)
- Attendance: 12,500 at York Park

=== Intrastate Matches ===
Intrastate Match (Monday, 17 June 1957)

- NTFA 16.20 (116) v TANFL 16.15 (111) – Att: 11,776 at North Hobart Oval

=== Interstate Matches ===
Interstate Match (Saturday, 20 July 1957)

- Victoria 15.17 (107) v Tasmania 13.14 (92) – Att: 16,721 at North Hobart Oval

Interstate Match (Saturday, 27 July 1957)

- South Australia 19.13 (127) v Tasmania 17.10 (112) – Att: 14,477 at North Hobart Oval

=== Leading Goalkickers: TANFL ===
- Ian Westell (Sandy Bay) – 67
- Noel Clarke (North Hobart) – 66
- Stuart Spencer (Clarence) – 54
- Joe Brown (New Norfolk) – 44
- Brian Eade (Glenorchy) – 43

=== Medal Winners ===
- Trevor Leo (Hobart) – William Leitch Medal
- Bruce Burn (Clarence) & Alan Gould (North Hobart) – George Watt Medal (Reserves)
- Russell Newell (Clarence) – V.A Geard Medal (Under-19's)
- Paddy Cooper (North Hobart) – Weller Arnold Medal (Best TANFL player in Intrastate match)

== 1957 TANFL Ladder ==
Pos	Team	Pld	W	L	D	PF	PA	PP	Pts
1	Glenorchy	18	13	4	1	1685	1445	116.6	54
2	North Hobart	18	13	5	0	1733	1386	125.0	52
3	Hobart	18	9	9	0	1440	1577	91.3	36
4	Sandy Bay	18	8	10	0	1593	1785	89.2	32
5	New Norfolk	18	6	12	0	1449	1573	92.1	24
6	Clarence	18	4	13	1	1446	1584	91.3	18

=== Round 1 ===
(Saturday, 13 April. Saturday, 20 April & Monday, 22 April 1957)

- Glenorchy 12.10 (82) v New Norfolk 8.9 (57) – Att: 5,879 at North Hobart Oval (13 April)
- Clarence 16.17 (113) v Sandy Bay 15.10 (100) – Att: 7,193 at North Hobart Oval (20 April)
- Nth Hobart 12.11 (83) v Hobart 10.8 (68) – Att: 6,096 at North Hobart Oval (22 April)

=== Round 2 ===
(Saturday, 27 April 1957)

- Hobart 7.14 (56) v New Norfolk 5.17 (47) – Att: 2,577 at North Hobart Oval
- Sandy Bay 10.15 (75) v Nth Hobart 10.13 (73) – Att: 2,906 at Queenborough Oval
- Glenorchy 8.12 (60) v Clarence 6.18 (54) – Att: 3,239 at Bellerive Oval

=== Round 3 ===
(Saturday, 4 May 1957)

- Nth Hobart 12.24 (96) v Clarence 10.12 (72) – Att: 5,387 at North Hobart Oval
- Hobart 12.8 (80) v Glenorchy 10.14 (74) – Att: 2,665 at KGV Park *
- Sandy Bay 14.12 (96) v New Norfolk 13.16 (94) – Att: 2,258 at Boyer Oval

Note: First official TANFL match played at KGV Park.

=== Round 4 ===
(Saturday, 11 May 1957)

- Hobart 17.13 (115) v Sandy Bay 13.13 (91) – Att: 3,642 at North Hobart Oval
- New Norfolk 13.17 (95) v Clarence 10.12 (72) – Att: 1,760 at Bellerive Oval
- Glenorchy 12.9 (81) v Nth Hobart 8.14 (62) – Att: 3,751 at KGV Park

=== Round 5 ===
(Saturday, 18 May 1957)

- New Norfolk 16.12 (108) v Nth Hobart 14.13 (97) – Att: 4,191 at North Hobart Oval
- Glenorchy 20.14 (134) v Sandy Bay 15.20 (110) – Att: 3,371 at KGV Park
- Hobart 12.12 (84) v Clarence 10.20 (80) – Att: 1,829 at Bellerive Oval

=== Round 6 ===
(Saturday, 25 May 1957)

- Nth Hobart 21.16 (142) v Hobart 9.15 (69) – Att: 5,120 at North Hobart Oval
- Sandy Bay 15.11 (101) v Clarence 14.13 (97) – Att: 2,455 at Queenborough Oval
- New Norfolk 16.16 (112) v Glenorchy 15.13 (103) – Att: 2,925 at Boyer Oval

=== Round 7 ===
(Saturday, 1 June 1957)

- Sandy Bay 12.9 (81) v North Hobart 10.17 (77) – Att: 5,283 at North Hobart Oval
- Glenorchy 13.19 (97) v Clarence 12.12 (84) – Att: 3,191 at KGV Park
- New Norfolk 16.15 (111) v Hobart 8.11 (59) – Att: 2,040 at Boyer Oval

=== Round 8 ===
(Saturday, 8 June 1957)

- Glenorchy 12.15 (87) v Hobart 11.12 (78) – Att: 4,024 at North Hobart Oval
- Sandy Bay 16.13 (109) v New Norfolk 13.14 (92) – Att: 3,800 at Queenborough Oval
- Nth Hobart 12.12 (84) v Clarence 11.10 (76) – Att: 2,706 at Bellerive Oval

=== Round 9 ===
(Saturday, 15 June 1957)

- Nth Hobart 17.13 (115) v Glenorchy 12.13 (85) – Att: 5,876 at North Hobart Oval
- Hobart 11.17 (83) v Sandy Bay 8.10 (58) – Att: 2,224 at Queenborough Oval
- Clarence 16.5 (101) v New Norfolk 15.10 (100) – Att: 2,289 at Bellerive Oval

=== Round 10 ===
(Saturday, 22 June 1957)

- Hobart 13.19 (97) v Clarence 14.11 (95) – Att: 3,564 at North Hobart Oval
- Glenorchy 17.14 (116) v Sandy Bay 10.14 (74) – Att: 2,723 at Queenborough Oval
- Nth Hobart 15.17 (107) v New Norfolk 5.12 (42) – Att: 2,793 at Boyer Oval

=== Round 11 ===
(Saturday, 29 June 1957)

- Nth Hobart 15.10 (100) v Hobart 11.20 (86) – Att: 4,500 at North Hobart Oval
- Glenorchy 15.7 (97) v New Norfolk 13.8 (86) – Att: 3,232 at KGV Park
- Clarence 14.14 (98) v Sandy Bay 10.8 (68) – Att: 2,440 at Bellerive Oval

=== Round 12 ===
(Saturday, 6 July 1957)

- Hobart 16.9 (105) v New Norfolk 15.10 (100) – Att: 3,425 at North Hobart Oval
- Nth Hobart 14.13 (97) v Sandy Bay 13.9 (87) – Att: 2,763 at Queenborough Oval
- Clarence 10.20 (80) v Glenorchy 12.8 (80) – Att: 3,280 at Bellerive Oval

=== Round 13 ===
(Saturday, 13 July 1957)

- Nth Hobart 18.21 (129) v Clarence 11.11 (77) – Att: 5,215 at North Hobart Oval
- Hobart 12.10 (82) v Glenorchy 9.12 (66) – Att: 2,882 at KGV Park
- Sandy Bay 15.11 (101) v New Norfolk 14.12 (96) – Att: 2,395 at Boyer Oval

=== Round 14 ===
(Saturday, 3 August 1957)

- Glenorchy 10.12 (72) v Nth Hobart 8.8 (56) – Att: 3,134 at North Hobart Oval
- Hobart 16.16 (112) v Sandy Bay 11.13 (79) – Att: 3,035 at Queenborough Oval
- New Norfolk 11.7 (73) v Clarence 7.12 (54) – Att: 2,016 at Boyer Oval

=== Round 15 ===
(Saturday, 10 August 1957)

- Nth Hobart 10.21 (81) v New Norfolk 12.6 (78) – Att: 3,159 at North Hobart Oval
- Glenorchy 15.16 (106) v Sandy Bay 13.12 (90) – Att: 2,086 at KGV Park
- Clarence 8.11 (59) v Hobart 5.9 (39) – Att: 1,226 at Bellerive Oval

=== Round 16 ===
(Saturday, 17 August 1957)

- Nth Hobart 15.16 (106) v Hobart 14.14 (98) – Att: 4,063 at North Hobart Oval
- Sandy Bay 15.18 (108) v Clarence 10.12 (72) – Att: 2,352 at Queenborough Oval
- Glenorchy 13.13 (91) v New Norfolk 7.14 (56) – Att: 2,116 at Boyer Oval

=== Round 17 ===
(Saturday, 24 August 1957)

- Nth Hobart 20.25 (145) v Sandy Bay 8.9 (57) – Att: 5,031 at North Hobart Oval
- Glenorchy 13.13 (91) v Clarence 12.16 (88) – Att: 1,820 at KGV Park
- Hobart 16.14 (110) v New Norfolk 10.17 (77) – Att: 1,630 at Boyer Oval

=== Round 18 ===
(Saturday, 31 August 1957)

- Glenorchy 25.13 (163) v Hobart 11.14 (80) – Att: 2,529 at North Hobart Oval
- Sandy Bay 16.12 (108) v New Norfolk 11.14 (80) – Att: 3,221 at Queenborough Oval
- Nth Hobart 12.11 (83) v Clarence 10.14 (74) – Att: 1,458 at Bellerive Oval

=== First Semi Final ===
(Saturday, 7 September 1957)

- Hobart: 2.3 (15) | 6.9 (45) | 9.10 (64) | 18.13 (121)
- Sandy Bay: 5.5 (35) | 9.8 (62) | 14.11 (95) | 15.14 (104)
- Attendance: 8,460 at North Hobart Oval

=== Second Semi Final ===
(Saturday, 14 September 1957)

- Nth Hobart: 1.5 (11) | 2.11 (23) | 8.12 (60) | 12.13 (85)
- Glenorchy: 0.2 (2) | 1.2 (8) | 2.3 (15) | 2.4 (16)
- Attendance: 7,764 at North Hobart Oval

=== Preliminary Final ===
(Saturday, 21 September 1957)

- Glenorchy: 4.2 (26) | 10.7 (67) | 13.12 (90) | 16.17 (113)
- Hobart: 4.3 (27) | 7.6 (48) | 11.8 (74) | 15.9 (99)
- Attendance: 9,842 at North Hobart Oval

=== Grand Final ===
(Saturday, 28 September 1957)

- Nth Hobart: 0.6 (6) | 5.9 (39) | 8.10 (58) | 11.15 (81)
- Glenorchy: 1.5 (11) | 1.8 (14) | 7.14 (56) | 9.15 (69)
- Attendance: 16,363 at North Hobart Oval
