= 1947 TANFL season =

Australian rules football season

- Teams: Clarence Kangaroos; New Town Magpies; Hobart Tigers; New Norfolk Eagles; North Hobart Robins; Sandy Bay Seagulls
- Premiers: Nth Hobart
- Minor premiers: Nth Hobart

Attendance
- Matches played: 49
- Total attendance: 144,292 (2,945 per match)

The 1947 Tasmanian Australian National Football League (TANFL) premiership season was an Australian Rules football competition staged in Hobart, Tasmania over fifteen (15) roster rounds and four (4) finals series matches between 19 April and 27 September 1947.

The TANFL introduced two new teams into the district-based competition: Clarence, from the eastern side of the River Derwent, and New Norfolk based fifteen miles north-west of Hobart. The country clubs were admitted for a two-year probationary basis, including probationary financial terms under which they were excluded from shared league dividends.

The league thus expanded from four clubs to six. The finals were expanded from three teams to four, with the Page system adopted.

There was a two-week break in mid-season to allow for the 1947 Australian National Football Championships to be played, all Carnival matches were staged at North Hobart Oval.

== Participating clubs ==
- Clarence District Football Club
- New Town District Football Club
- Hobart Football Club
- New Norfolk District Football Club
- North Hobart Football Club
- Sandy Bay Football Club

=== 1947 TANFL Club Coaches ===
- Bert McTaggart (Clarence)
- Brian Kelly (New Town)
- Jack Sullivan (Hobart)
- Albert "Tich" Edwards (New Norfolk)
- Jack Metherell (North Hobart)
- Lance Collins (Sandy Bay)

=== TANFL Reserves Grand Final ===
- Nth Hobart 9.6 (60) v Sandy Bay 6.13 (49) – North Hobart Oval

=== TANFL Under-19's Grand Final ===
State Schools Old Boys Football Association (SSOBFA)

- Buckingham 8.10 (58) v South East 6.7 (43) – New Town Oval

Note: Buckingham were affiliated to New Town, South East were affiliated to Sandy Bay.

=== State Grand Final ===
(Saturday, 4 October 1947)

- Nth Launceston: 7.7 (49) | 9.8 (62) | 14.11 (95) | 19.16 (130)
- Nth Hobart: 0.1 (1) | 6.3 (39) | 7.4 (46) | 10.9 (69)
- Attendance: 7,500 at York Park

=== Intrastate Matches ===
Jubilee Shield (Saturday, 10 May 1947)

- TANFL 18.14 (122) v NWFU 16.15 (111) – Att: 10,000 at North Hobart Oval

Jubilee Shield (Saturday, 7 June 1947)

- TANFL 13.14 (92) v NWFU 9.13 (67) – Att: 7,000 at Devonport Oval

Jubilee Shield (Saturday, 21 June 1947)

- TANFL 17.13 (115) v NTFA 14.19 (103) – Att: 10,000 at North Hobart Oval

Jubilee Shield (Saturday, 12 July 1947)

- TANFL 15.9 (99) v NTFA 14.10 (94) – Att: 10,000 at York Park

=== Interstate Matches ===
- See: 1947 Australian National Football Carnival

=== Leading Goalkickers: TANFL ===
- Lance Collins (Sandy Bay) – 50

=== Medal Winners ===
- Jack Sullivan (Hobart) – William Leitch Medal
- Neil Clarke (Sandy Bay) – George Watt Medal (Reserves)
- Alan Hughes (Macalburn) – V.A Geard Medal (Under-19's)

== 1947 TANFL Ladder ==
Pos	Team	Pld	W	L	D	PF	PA	PP	Pts
1	North Hobart	15	11	4	0	1180	966	122.2	44
2	Hobart	15	11	4	0	1187	985	120.5	44
3	Sandy Bay	15	10	5	0	1421	1131	125.6	40
4	New Town	15	9	6	0	1132	1028	110.1	36
5	Clarence	15	3	12	0	942	1158	81.3	12
6	New Norfolk	15	1	14	0	838	1369	61.2	4

=== Round 1 ===
(Saturday, 19 April 1947)

- New Town 12.18 (90) v Nth Hobart 7.13 (55) – Att: 4,574 at North Hobart Oval
- Sandy Bay 14.14 (98) v Hobart 8.17 (65) – Att: 3,142 at Queenborough Oval
- Clarence 16.15 (111) v New Norfolk 9.13 (67) – Att: 834 at Bellerive Oval *

Note: Clarence Football Club's maiden TANFL victory, also first TANFL match at Bellerive Oval.

=== Round 2 ===
(Saturday, 26 April 1947)

- Nth Hobart 17.14 (116) v Sandy Bay 14.11 (95) – Att: 5,446 at North Hobart Oval
- Hobart 13.18 (96) v Clarence 14.8 (92) – Att: 2,006 at TCA Ground
- New Town 16.19 (115) v New Norfolk 7.14 (56) – Att: 1,456 at Boyer Oval *

Note: First TANFL match staged at Boyer Oval (built by ANM Limited in 1945).

=== Round 3 ===
(Saturday, 3 May 1947)

- New Town 12.19 (91) v Sandy Bay 12.12 (84) – Att: 6,160 at North Hobart Oval
- Hobart 9.13 (67) v New Norfolk 9.7 (61) – Att: 1,085 at TCA Ground
- Nth Hobart 9.18 (72) v Clarence 1.7 (13) – Att: 1,592 at Bellerive Oval

=== Round 4 ===
(Saturday, 17 May 1947)

- Hobart 6.21 (57) v New Town 6.9 (45) – Att: 3,165 at North Hobart Oval
- Sandy Bay 7.9 (51) v Clarence 5.18 (48) – Att: 1,609 at Queenborough Oval
- Nth Hobart 6.18 (54) v New Norfolk 4.11 (35) – Att: 1,100 at Boyer Oval

=== Round 5 ===
(Saturday, 24 May 1947)

- Nth Hobart 12.13 (85) v Hobart 11.8 (74) – Att: 5,705 at North Hobart Oval
- New Town 14.14 (98) v Clarence 11.17 (83) – Att: 1,490 at Bellerive Oval
- Sandy Bay 15.20 (110) v New Norfolk 10.15 (75) – Att: 1,555 at Queenborough Oval

=== Round 6 ===
(Saturday, 31 May 1947)

- New Town 14.15 (99) v Nth Hobart 14.14 (98) – Att: 5,755 at North Hobart Oval
- Hobart 17.14 (116) v Sandy Bay 14.10 (94) – Att: 2,727 at TCA Ground
- Clarence 13.7 (85) v New Norfolk 8.7 (55) – Att: 2,400 at Boyer Oval

=== Round 7 ===
(Saturday, 14 June 1947)

- New Town 13.19 (97) v New Norfolk 10.10 (70) – Att: 2,462 at North Hobart Oval
- Nth Hobart 14.11 (95) v Sandy Bay 12.16 (88) – Att: 3,179 at Queenborough Oval
- Hobart 18.15 (123) v Clarence 10.16 (76) – Att: 1,847 at Bellerive Oval

=== Round 8 ===
(Monday, 16 June 1947)

- Nth Hobart 6.9 (45) v Clarence 3.13 (31) – Att: 1,644 at North Hobart Oval
- Sandy Bay 10.11 (71) v New Town 8.15 (63) – Att: 1,330 at Queenborough Oval
- Hobart 7.6 (48) v New Norfolk 2.8 (20) – Att: 500 at Boyer Oval

=== Round 9 ===
(Saturday, 28 June 1947)

- Hobart 11.12 (78) v New Town 8.11 (59) – Att: 3,575 at TCA Ground
- Nth Hobart 10.12 (72) v New Norfolk 7.6 (48) – Att: 817 at Queenborough Oval
- Sandy Bay 21.23 (149) v Clarence 12.14 (86) – Att: 1,652 at Bellerive Oval

=== Round 10 ===
(Saturday, 5 July 1947)

- Nth Hobart 10.10 (70) v Hobart 7.9 (51) – Att: 5,675 at TCA Ground
- New Town 10.17 (77) v Clarence 11.6 (72) – Att: 1,076 at Queenborough Oval
- Sandy Bay 14.7 (91) v New Norfolk 7.14 (56) – Att: 1,039 at Boyer Oval

=== Round 11 ===
(Saturday, 19 July 1947)

- New Town 10.11 (71) v Nth Hobart 7.13 (55) – Att: 3,400 at TCA Ground
- Hobart 9.16 (70) v Sandy Bay 5.16 (46) – Att: 3,283 at Queenborough Oval
- New Norfolk 15.10 (100) v Clarence 9.13 (67) – Att: 851 at Bellerive Oval *

Note: New Norfolk District Football Club's maiden TANFL victory.

=== Round 12 ===
(Saturday, 26 July 1947)

- Hobart 15.24 (114) v Clarence 8.7 (55) – Att: 1,596 at TCA Ground
- Sandy Bay 15.18 (108) v Nth Hobart 8.13 (61) – Att: 4,224 at Queenborough Oval
- New Town 10.12 (72) v New Norfolk 5.9 (39) – Att: 1,550 at Boyer Oval

=== Round 13 ===
(Saturday, 16 August 1947)

- Sandy Bay 10.14 (74) v New Town 7.9 (51) – Att: 3,731 at TCA Ground
- Hobart 14.20 (104) v New Norfolk 8.4 (52) – Att: 884 at Queenborough Oval
- Nth Hobart 14.13 (97) v Clarence 10.15 (75) – Att: 800 at Bellerive Oval

=== Round 14 ===
(Saturday, 23 August 1947)

- Hobart 10.9 (69) v New Town 7.9 (51) – Att: 4,339 at North Hobart Oval
- Sandy Bay 15.20 (110) v Clarence 9.13 (67) – Att: 1,570 at Queenborough Oval
- Nth Hobart 17.22 (124) v New Norfolk 5.3 (33) – Att: 1,030 at Boyer Oval

=== Round 15 ===
(Saturday, 30 August 1947)

- Nth Hobart 10.21 (81) v Hobart 7.13 (55) – Att: 4,186 at North Hobart Oval
- Sandy Bay 23.14 (152) v New Norfolk 9.17 (71) – Att: 700 at Queenborough Oval
- Clarence 8.19 (67) v New Town 7.11 (53) – Att: 890 at Bellerive Oval

=== First Semi Final ===
(Saturday, 6 September 1947)

- New Town: 5.6 (36) | 9.10 (64) | 9.12 (66) | 13.16 (94)
- Sandy Bay: 1.1 (7) | 2.3 (15) | 5.5 (35) | 8.8 (56)
- Attendance: 6,630 at North Hobart Oval

=== Second Semi Final ===
(Saturday, 13 September 1947)

- Hobart: 2.2 (14) | 4.6 (30) | 6.10 (46) | 7.16 (58)
- Nth Hobart: 3.6 (24) | 3.6 (24) | 5.7 (37) | 7.8 (50)
- Attendance: 7,846 at North Hobart Oval

=== Preliminary Final ===
(Saturday, 20 September 1947)

- Nth Hobart: 1.1 (7) | 5.4 (34) | 11.10 (76) | 12.11 (83)
- New Town: 2.6 (18) | 4.7 (31) | 5.8 (38) | 9.10 (64)
- Attendance: 8,789 at North Hobart Oval

=== Grand Final ===
(Saturday, 27 September 1947)

- Nth Hobart: 2.0 (12) | 3.3 (21) | 8.5 (53) | 13.7 (85)
- Hobart: 2.4 (16) | 4.5 (29) | 8.8 (56) | 10.9 (69)
- Attendance: 11,396 at North Hobart Oval

Source: All scores and statistics courtesy of the Hobart Mercury publications.
