= Tom Couch =

Australian rules footballer

Personal information
- Full name: Thomas Couch
- Born: 17 June 1988 (age 38)
- Original team: Geelong (VFL)
- Draft: No. 24, 2012 Rookie Draft, Melbourne
- Height: 177 cm (5 ft 10 in)
- Weight: 79 kg (174 lb)
- Position: Midfielder

Playing career^{1}
Years	Club	Games (Goals)
2012–2013	Melbourne	3 (0)
- ^{1} Playing statistics correct to the end of 2013.

Career highlights
- 2012 Gardiner Clark Medal

Thomas Couch (born 17 June 1988) is a tennis trainer and former professional Australian rules football player. Couch played three games in two seasons for the Melbourne Football Club in the Australian Football League (AFL) but was delisted at the end of the 2013 season.

Couch was recruited by Melbourne in the 2012 Rookie Draft with pick number 24. He made his debut in round 16, 2012, against Fremantle at Docklands Stadium. While playing with the Casey Scorpions (Melbourne's reserve team) in 2012, Couch won the Gardiner Clark Medal as the Casey Scorpions best and fairest for the season. Couch also came second in the 2012 Liston Trophy.

After being delisted by Melbourne, Couch started playing for North Launceston in the Tasmanian State League in 2014 Couch was subsequently appointed playing coach of North Launceston for the 2017 season.

Since 2019, he has served as a trainer for American tennis player Danielle Collins.

Couch is the son of Brownlow Medal winner Paul Couch.
