= Lauderdale Oval =

Sports ground in Tasmania, Australia

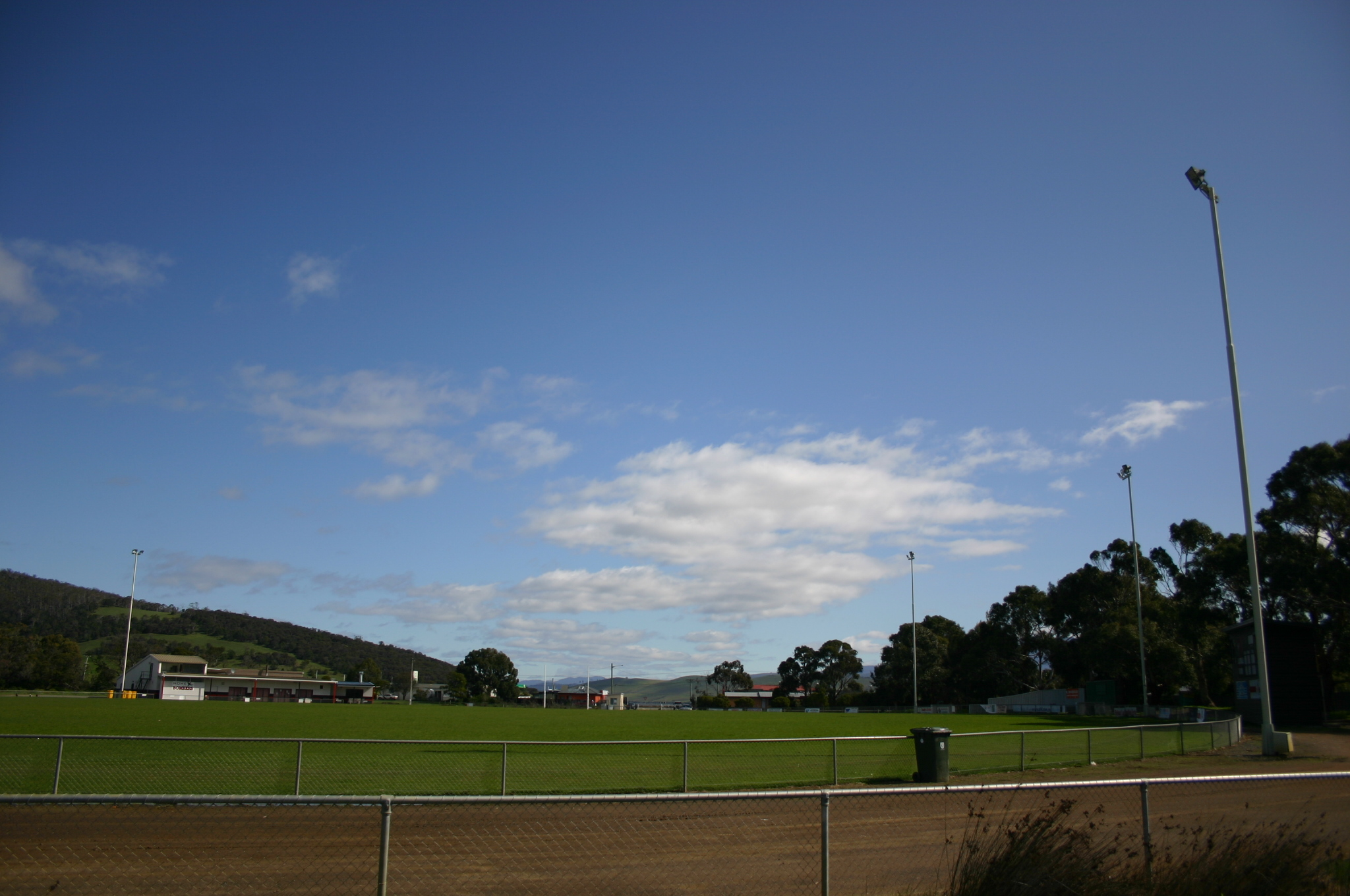
- Interactive map of Lauderdale Oval
- Location: Donna Street, Lauderdale, Tasmania, Australis
- Coordinates: 42°54′54″S 147°29′18″E
- Owner: Clarence City Council
- Operator: Clarence City Council
- Capacity: 2,500
- Surface: Grass
- Field size: 140 m × 121 m (459 ft × 397 ft)

Tenant
- Lauderdale Football Club (SFL Premier League)

Lauderdale Oval or Lauderdale Sports Ground is a suburban Australian rules football and cricket ground situated in the beach-side Hobart suburb of Lauderdale, Tasmania, Australia. It is home of the Lauderdale Football Club in the SFL Premier League and has been used by the Lauderdale Football Club since 1979 in both amateur and country football.

In 1998, Lauderdale Oval underwent upgrades for increased lighting, enabling the ground to be used for night football in the Southern Football League.

== Major upgrades to commence in 2010 ==
On 25 December 2009, plans were announced for further upgrades to the playing surface and other amenities at the ground for the 2010 TSL Season. Plans include extending the playing surface by 20 metres in length and 10 metres in width, new perimeter fencing around the field and venue itself, reclaiming part of the swampland and tip-site next to the ground for proper car-parking facilities for spectators, grading and reshaping of the oval with urgent priority given to new drainage systems, relaying new turf with works to commence in January 2010 and be completed by the time Lauderdale hosts its second home match against Glenorchy on 24 April 2010.

On top of this, the Lauderdale Football Club also has plans to continue developing the ground to turn it into a sporting precinct for the area with viewing areas for spectators with a spectator hill and a grandstand, building toilets on the outer wing, complete a lighting upgrade and improve facilities for corporate and marquee memberships.
