= Tasmanian Football League =

Australian rules football league in Tasmania

Tasmanian State League
- Most recent season or competition: 2024 TSL season
- Formerly: List: TFA (1879–1886); STFA (1887–1896); STFL (1897); STFA (1898-1905); TFL (1906–1927); TANFL (1928–1985); TFL Statewide League (1986–1998); TSFL (1999); SWL (2000); TSL (2009–2024)
- Sport: Australian rules football
- Founded: 12 June 1879; 147 years ago
- Folded: 2024
- No. of teams: 7
- Headquarters: Hobart
- Region: Tasmania
- Most titles: North Hobart (27 premierships)
- Broadcaster: Southern Cross Seven
- Website: tasmanianstateleague.com.au

The Tasmanian State League (TSL), colloquially known as the Tasmanian Football League (TFL), was the highest-level Australian rules football competition in the state of Tasmania.

The league has a long history which dates back to its foundation on 12 June 1879 as the Tasmanian Football Association, giving it some claim to the title of the third-oldest club football league in the world. For most of its history, it served as the top football competition in Hobart and the governing football body across the whole of Tasmania. From 1986 until 2000, its onfield competition expanded, incorporating clubs from Launceston and the north-west coast to become a statewide league. Its role as state governing body ended with the formation of Football Tasmania in 1999, and debts saw the league collapse at the end of 2000.

After eight years' hiatus, the league was re-established as a statewide league in 2009, and operated until the end of 2024 when it was disbanded in preparation for the Tasmania Football Club to enter the Victorian Football League (VFL) in 2026.

== History ==
=== Early history ===
The Tasmanian Football Association was established on 12 June 1879, giving it some claim to the title of the third-oldest club football league in the world. Delegates at the inaugural meeting represented the City, Cricketers, Richmond, Railway, New Town, High School and Hutchins School clubs, and voted by majority to adopt a modified variation of the Victorian rules, with the notable exception at the time that the goalposts included a cross-bar above which a goal was required to be kicked. The standard Australian rules were adopted through the intercolonial conferences in the 1880s.

The league underwent name changes to the South Tasmanian Football Association in 1887, and then the Tasmanian Football League in 1906. The same year, with the establishment of the Australasian Football Council, the TFL was formally established as the governing administrative body for football across the whole of Tasmania. However, the onfield premiership run by the TFL remained limited to the local clubs around Hobart, with other leagues such as the Northern Tasmanian Football Association in Launceston or North West Football Union on the north-west coast running their own premierships locally.

The TFL remained a small league, typically only three or four clubs competing. The collection of teams changed frequently through the first few decades, but became stable by 1908, when the core clubs were North Hobart, Lefroy and Cananore. New Town was later admitted as a fourth club in 1921, and that quartet contested the next two decades.

=== District era ===
The league went into recess between 1942 and 1944 due to World War II. In 1944, the league's directors met to discuss restructuring of the league under a district scheme with players zoned to clubs based upon which district they resided in. District clubs were established along the west of the Derwent for the 1945 season at Hobart, Sandy Bay, North Hobart and New Town.

Two further country districts were set up as part of the scheme: Clarence, to the east of the Derwent; and New Norfolk, fifteen miles north-west of the city. The Clarence and New Norfolk clubs were admitted to the league for the 1947 season under a two-year probationary periods, during which they were competing but excluded from shared league financial dividends; they were retained for at least a further two seasons with increased financial support in 1949; and they were made full, permanent and equal members of the league in August 1950.

From 1948, the Glenorchy Football Club – positioned in Hobart's growing industrial northern suburbs, but also in New Town's district, sought admission to the league, with its long-term home KGV Oval built in 1950. Glenorchy's admission as a seventh club, and its impact on the district boundaries, was discussed and rejected repeatedly over the next decade, and further country expansion with an eighth club in either Kingborough or Huon to avoid requiring a weekly bye was discussed in the same context. Finally, ahead of the 1957 season, Glenorchy entered the league via an amalgamation with New Town: the merged club moved to KGV Oval, adopted the Glenorchy name retained the New Town black and white colours, and Glenorchy's, Hobart's and North Hobart's district boundaries were redrawn to accommodate the northward growth.

The district era was the strongest one for the league with a succession of star players in its ranks, record crowds and huge public support. This set of six clubs contested the league unchanged for almost the next three decades.

=== Disbandment ===
The league disbanded due to a dwindling of clubs able to financially cope and fell under the umbrella of Football Tasmania (which was soon renamed AFL Tasmania).

Three regional leagues absorbed the clubs from the Statewide League. This was represented by the 2 main north–south leagues and subsidiary regional leagues which underpinned the Tasmanian Devils VFL team, created in 2001 which was owned and funded by the Australian Football League and administered by AFL Tasmania.

=== Tasmanian State League ===
After a hiatus of eight years, AFL Tasmania announced plans for a return of the statewide league in 2009.

The concept attracted widespread public and media debate on the return of a statewide competition, with many in the football world hesitant over such a move due to the perilous financial position most of the participating clubs were left in after the previous competition was disbanded in 2000.
Many believed the push for a return of the league was a direct result of the media and the Tasmanian State Government's strong campaign in getting a Tasmanian team admitted into the AFL.

Under the AFL Tasmania plan, ten (10) clubs were invited to join the competition.

Clarence, Glenorchy, Hobart and North Hobart along with former Southern amateur club Lauderdale in the South. North Launceston, South Launceston and Launceston from the North and Devonport and Burnie Dockers from the North-West Coast.

The response from many clubs was initially lukewarm at best with many concerned at the lack of detail in the AFL Tasmania plan and the rushed decision-making process of the move.

Ulverstone from the North West Coast bowed to pressure from its playing list and some factional groups within the club to put in a submission to join the competition in 2009. Despite a membership vote narrowly ending in favour of joining, the Robins had missed the AFL Tasmania enforced deadline and were initially to be included in the 2010 roster, however the remaining clubs (most notably its closest and most bitter rival Devonport) exerted considerable pressure upon the League not to alter the current makeup of teams for a period of ten years, therefore Ulverstone were excluded from joining.

SFL Premier League club Kingborough also lobbied AFL Tasmania to be included in the competition, but their case for inclusion was dismissed by the game's governing body due to their inadequate facilities and poor standard Kingston Beach Oval headquarters. Former TFL club New Norfolk (1947–1999) was also not invited to join the league because of their poor financial position. Also, as a result of the new competition getting off the ground, the Tasmania Devils VFL team was disbanded.

On 4 April 2009, the opening match of the reformed competition took place at King George V Park between the reigning premiers of the SFL Premier League, Glenorchy and reigning NTFL premier Launceston and resulted in a 21-point triumph to the Blues.

The inaugural Grand Final was held at Bellerive Oval on 19 September between old rivals Glenorchy and Clarence resulting in a thrilling 6-point victory to the Roos in front of 7,534 fans.

The 2010 season started brightly with over 12,000 attending the first round of matches but soon after there was a great deal of off-field controversy with former Tasmanian Premier Paul Lennon originally accepting an unpaid role acting as a mediator between the clubs and AFL Tasmania as the relationship between the clubs and the governing body had become further strained. However, after only two weeks of the season, three clubs (Clarence, North Launceston and North Hobart) had decided to do their own bidding and Lennon walked away from the position.

There were further controversies, namely AFL Tasmania's decision to withdraw support for the Reserve grade competition after the Burnie Dockers announced only days before the start of the season that they would not be fielding a reserve grade side. Two other clubs (Hobart and Launceston) also struggled to field a reserves team throughout the season, and as a result the competition was run by the clubs themselves for the remainder of the season. It would be axed at season's end.

A finals set-up that included an extra week was roundly criticised by football pundits across the State and it failed to garner great enthusiasm amongst the footballing public as small crowds attended, with AFL Tasmania later admitting that they would be looking at returning to the more tradition Final Five set-up in 2011.

During the 2013 season, South Launceston decided that it would not pursue a new TSL licence at the end of the season, and arranged to move into the newest Northern Tasmanian Football Association in 2014; despite this, the club went on to win the 2013 premiership, meaning that there was no defending premier in 2014. The club was replaced by the Prospect State Football Club, which competes under the formal club name of Western Storm Football Club. At the same time, the North Hobart Football Club was forced to disband as a team by AFL Tasmania in favour of the newly established Hobart City Football Club, whilst the Hobart Tigers left for the Southern Football League. These movements were forced upon the league to make space for a new AFL Tasmania backed TSL club, the Kingborough Tigers Football Club.

Prior to 2016, the Western Storm was rebranded as the Prospect Hawks; but it was unable to field a senior team in 2016, managing only to field an uncompetitive team in the reserves, before being expelled from the league at the end of the 2016 season. Prior to 2018, both north-western clubs – Burnie and Devonport – found themselves unable to viably field teams in the competition, with withdrew, reducing the size of the competition to seven teams.

On 9 October 2017 the paying members of the Hobart City Demons voted 371–118 in favour of returning the playing name of the club to the North Hobart identity for season 2018 and beyond.

In May 2023, AFL Tasmania announced that the Tasmanian State League would disband at the end of the 2024 season, with organisers stating that the best model for Tasmanian football going forward was by fielding a team in the Victorian Football League, VFL Women's and Talent League competitions, as part of the Tasmania Football Club's accession into the Australian Football League in 2028. Teams located around in and around Hobart transferred to the Southern Football League while northern-based teams moved to the Northern Tasmanian Football Association. The final state league premiership was won by North Launceston, who defeated Lauderdale by 17 points in the grand final.

== Clubs ==
=== Final clubs ===
Club	Colours	Nickname	Home Ground	Former League	Est.	Years in TSL	TSL Premierships		Fate
Club	Colours	Nickname	Home Ground	Former League	Est.	Years in TSL	Total	Final	Fate
Clarence	(1950s-70s)(1947-49, 70s-2024)	Roos	Bellerive Oval, Bellerive	SDFA, SFL	1884	1947-2000, 2009-2024	11	2010	Returned to SFL in 2025
Glenorchy (New Town District 1921-56)	(1921-41)(1945-2024)	Magpies	KGV Oval, Glenorchy	SFL	1919	1921-2000, 2009-2024	15	2016	Returned to SFL in 2025
Kingborough (Kingston 1893-2007, Tigers 2014-21)		Tigers	Kingston Twin Ovals, Kingston	SFL	1886	1893-1907, 2014-2024	1	2023	Returned to SFL in 2025
Lauderdale		Bombers	Lauderdale Oval, Lauderdale	SFL	1979	2009-2024	0	−	Returned to SFL in 2025
Launceston		Blues	Windsor Park, Riverside	NTFL	1875	1994-2000, 2009-2024	4	2022	Moved to NTFA in 2025
North Hobart (Hobart Demons 1999-2000, Hobart City 2014-17)		Demons	North Hobart Oval, North Hobart	SFL	1881	1881-2000, 2009-2024	27	1992	Returned to SFL in 2025
North Launceston (Northern Bombers 2000)		Bombers	York Park, Invermay	NTFA, NTFL	1893	1986-2000, 2009-2024	8	2024	Moved to NTFA in 2025

=== Former clubs ===
Club	Colours	Nickname	Home Ground	Former League	Est.	Years in TSL	TSL Premierships		Fate
Club	Colours	Nickname	Home Ground	Former League	Est.	Years in TSL	Total	Final	Fate
Burnie Hawks		Hawks	West Park Oval, Burnie	–	1987	1987-1994	0	–	Absorbed Burnie Tigers after 1993 season, became Burnie Dockers in 1995
Burnie Dockers	(1995-2000, 2009-10)(2011-17)	Dockers	West Park Oval, Burnie	–	1995	1995-2000, 2009-2017	1	2012	Moved to NWFL in 2001 and 2018
Cananore		Canaries	TCA Ground, Queens Domain	–	1901	1908-1941	11	1933	Folded after 1941 season
City			Battery Ground	–	1876	1879-1896	4	1892	Folded after 1896 season
Cricketers			TCA Ground, Queens Domain	–	1876	1879-1885	2	1884	Folded after 1885 season
Derwent		Rovers		–	1905	1906-1907	1	1906	Folded after 1907 season
Devonport	(1987-1996)(1997-2000)(2009-2017)	Magpies	Devonport Oval, Devonport	NWFU, NTFL	1881	1987-2000, 2009-2017	1	1988	Moved to NWFL in 2001 and 2018
East Launceston		Demons	York Park, Invermay	NTFA	1948	1986	0	–	Merged with City-South to form South Launceston in May 1986
Hobart		Tigers	TCA Ground, Queens Domain	SFL	1944	1945-1997, 2009-2013	9	1990	Moved to Southern FL in 1998 and 2014
Holebrook	(1881) (1884, 88) (1886)		John Fisher's Paddock, opposite Glen House on upper Macquarie St	–	1880	1880-1893	3	1891	Folded after 1893 season
Lefroy		Blues	TCA Ground, Queens Domain and North Hobart Oval, North Hobart	–	1898	1898-1941	9	1937	Folded after 1941 season
New Norfolk (Derwent Eagles 1999)		Eagles	Boyer Oval, New Norfolk	SDFA	1878	1947-1999	2	1982	Moved to Southern FL in 2000
Prospect Hawks (Western Storm 2014-15)	(2014)(2015)(2016)	Hawks	York Park, Invermay and Prospect Park, Prospect	–	2014	2014-2016	0	–	Reserves only in 2016, folded at season's end.
Sandy Bay	(1945-67)(1967-96)(1997)	Seagulls	Queenborough Oval, Sandy Bay	–	1944	1945-1997	8	1978	Folded after 1997 season
South Launceston		Bulldogs	Youngtown Memorial Oval, Youngtown	–	1986	1986-1997, 2009-2013	1	2013	Moved to NTFL in 1998 and NTFA in 2014
Southern Cats		Cats	North Hobart Oval, North Hobart	–	1998	1998-1999	0	–	Folded in May 1999
Summerton				–	1898	1898	0	–	Folded
Union				–	1887	1887	0	–	Folded
Wellington (Railway 1879-96, South Hobart 1897)	(1879-96)		Battery Ground	–	1876	1879-1905	12	1904	Folded

=== Premiership years ===
Club	Colours	Nickname	Flag Years
Burnie Dockers		Dockers	2012
Cananore		Canaries	1909, 1910, 1911, 1913, 1921, 1922, 1925, 1926, 1927, 1931, 1933
City			1879, 1886, 1888, 1892
Clarence		Kangaroos	1947, 1970, 1979, 1981, 1984, 1993, 1994, 1996, 1997, 2000, 2009, 2010
Cricketers			1880, 1884
Derwent		Rovers	1906
Devonport		Magpies	1988
Glenorchy		Magpies	1935, 1948, 1949, 1951, 1953, 1955, 1956, 1958, 1965, 1975, 1983, 1985, 1986, 1999, 2016
Hobart		Tigers	1950, 1954, 1959, 1960, 1963, 1966, 1973, 1980, 1990
Holebrook			1885, 1890, 1891
Kingborough		Tigers	2023
Lauderdale		Bombers	-
Launceston		Blues	2011, 2020, 2021, 2022
Lefroy		Blues	1898, 1899, 1901, 1907, 1912, 1915, 1924, 1930, 1937
New Norfolk (Derwent Eagles 1999)		Eagles	1968, 1982
North Hobart		Demons	1881, 1902, 1905, 1908, 1914, 1920, 1923, 1928, 1929, 1932, 1934, 1936, 1938, 1939, 1940, 1941, 1945, 1947, 1957, 1961, 1962, 1967, 1969, 1974, 1987, 1989, 1991, 1992
North Launceston		Bombers	1995, 1998, 2014, 2015, 2017, 2018, 2019, 2024
Sandy Bay		Seagulls	1946, 1952, 1964, 1971, 1972, 1976, 1977, 1978
South Launceston		Bulldogs	2013
Wellington (Railway 1879-96, South Hobart 1897)	(1879-96)		1881, 1882, 1883, 1887, 1889, 1893, 1894, 1895, 1896, 1900, 1903, 1904

== League Presidents ==
President	Period
Mr W.L Giblin	1879–86
Sir L.Dobson	1887–93
Sir E.Braddon	1894–96
Mr H.Dobson MHA	1897
Mr A.I Clark	1898–99
Mr C.J.Eady	1900–08
Mr A.Hearne	1909–16
Mr W.B Propsting	1917–24
Mr C.J Eady MLC	1925–41
Mr W.Arnold	1942–49
Mr M.A.S McNeair OBE	1950–74
Mr R.T Butler	1975–77
Mr D.A Burton	1977–79
Mr D.Fenton	1979–80
Mr J.Bennett	1981–85
Mr D.Smith	1986–91
Mr J.Wilkinson QC	1991
Mr B.Breen	1992–95
Mr R.Hampson	1996–98
Mr B.Greenhill	1999–2000
Mr S.Wade	2000, 2009–11
Mr S.Young	2012–14
C.Saunder	2016-2024

== Premierships, leading goalkickers and records ==
Since the first championship held in 1879, North Hobart has won the most premiers with 27 titles. The first champion ever was City FC, a club now defunct.

== Individual awards ==
=== Alastair Lynch Medal ===
Formerly known as the Tassie Medal, presented to the Best and Fairest player in the Tasmanian State League from 2009.

Year	Player	Club(s)
2009	Kurt Heazlewood	(Devonport)
2010	Brett Geappen	(Clarence)
2011	Tim Bristow	(Launceston)
2012	Jaye Bowden	(Glenorchy)
2013	Mitch Thorp	(South Launceston)
2014	Daniel Roozendaal	(North Launceston)
2015	Jaye Bowden	(Glenorchy)
2016	Jaye Bowden	(Glenorchy)
2017	Bradley Cox-Goodyer	(North Launceston)
2018	Josh Ponting	(North Launceston)
2019	Josh Ponting	(North Launceston)
2020	Sam Siggins	(Lauderdale)
2021	Bradley Cox-Goodyer	(North Launceston)
2022	Sam Siggins	(Lauderdale)
2023	Sam Siggins	(Lauderdale)
2024	Bradley Cox-Goodyer	(North Launceston)

=== Peter Hudson Medal ===
Presented to the Leading Goalkicker in the Tasmanian State League from 2009.

Year	Player	Club(s)
2009	Brad Dutton	(Clarence)
2010	Brian Finch	(Launceston)
2011	Brian Finch	(Launceston)
2012	Mitch Williamson	(Clarence)
2013	Sonny Whiting	(Launceston)
2014	Aaron Cornelius	(Glenorchy)
2015	Jaye Bowden	(Glenorchy)
2016	Jaye Bowden	(Glenorchy)
2017	Jaye Bowden	(Glenorchy)
2018	Mitch Thorp	(Launceston)
2019	Aiden Grace	(Glenorchy)
2020	Dylan Riley	(Launceston)
2021	Dylan Riley	(Launceston)
2022	Colin Garland	(Clarence)
2023	Brad Cox-Goodyer	(North Launceston)
2024	Harvey Griffiths	(North Launceston)

=== Former Individual Awards ===
==== Wilson Bailey Trophy ====
It was presented to the best and fairest player in the TFL/TANFL from 1927 until 1929. It was replaced by the William Leitch Medal in 1930.

Year	Player	Club(s)
1927	K.Roberts	(New Town)
1928	G.Cole	(New Town)
1929	A.Leitch	(New Town)

==== George Watt Medallists ====
It was presented to the best and fairest player in the TANFL from 1935 until 1939. It replaced the William Leitch Medal although it ended up being replaced by it in 1940

Year	Player	Club(s)
1935	L.Powell	(North Hobart)
1936	E.Zschech	(Lefroy)
1937	L.Pye & E.Zschech	(North Hobart), (Lefroy)
1938	L.Pye	(North Hobart)
1939	E.Zschech	(Lefroy)

==== William Leitch Medal ====
The William Leitch Medal was presented to the best & fairest player in the TANFL/TFL Statewide League from 1930 to 1934 and 1940–2000.
As of 2009 when the Tasmanian State League was revived, AFL Tasmania decided to award the Tassie Medal to the best and fairest player in the revamped competition as it was seen (particularly in the North) that the William Leitch medal was too Hobart-centric. The medal continues to be presented to the best and fairest player in the Southern Football League since 2004.

== Audience ==
=== Media ===
==== Official Magazine ====
Currently there is no official magazine for games during the 2014 season. A new provider and TSL Record is currently being re-designed for the 2015 season and beyond through Tall Zebra Media.

==== Television ====
Currently Southern Cross Seven shows one game a week on Saturday afternoons. Previously ABC and WIN broadcast the league.

All Tasmanian based stations have news and results shown regularly in their news broadcasts. Southern Cross report full-time scores from the TFL as well as other leagues around the state during the half time break of their Saturday night AFL broadcast.

==== Radio ====
League matches were formerly broadcast on radio from 1931 to 2000, however there are currently no radio broadcasts of TFL football with the exception of the Grand Final and the occasional roster game on ABC Local Radio which is also streamed online.

==== Newspapers ====
The Hobart Mercury in the South, The Examiner in Launceston and the North as well as The Advocate on the North West Coast all provide extensive coverage of TSL football in their publications.

=== Attendance ===
The Tasmanian Football league crowds compete heavily with AFL matches on television. Crowds at the beginning of the season are usually quite high and are up with the mainland state football competitions. Attendances usually slide considerably until it will increase during the finals. Night games, especially ones that do not clash with AFL matches are well attended.

Patrons at TFL games pay at the gates or hold club season passes.

== See also ==
- Australian rules football in Tasmania
- Northern Tasmanian Football League
- Southern Football League (Tasmania)
