= AFL Tasmania =

Australian Football League governing body

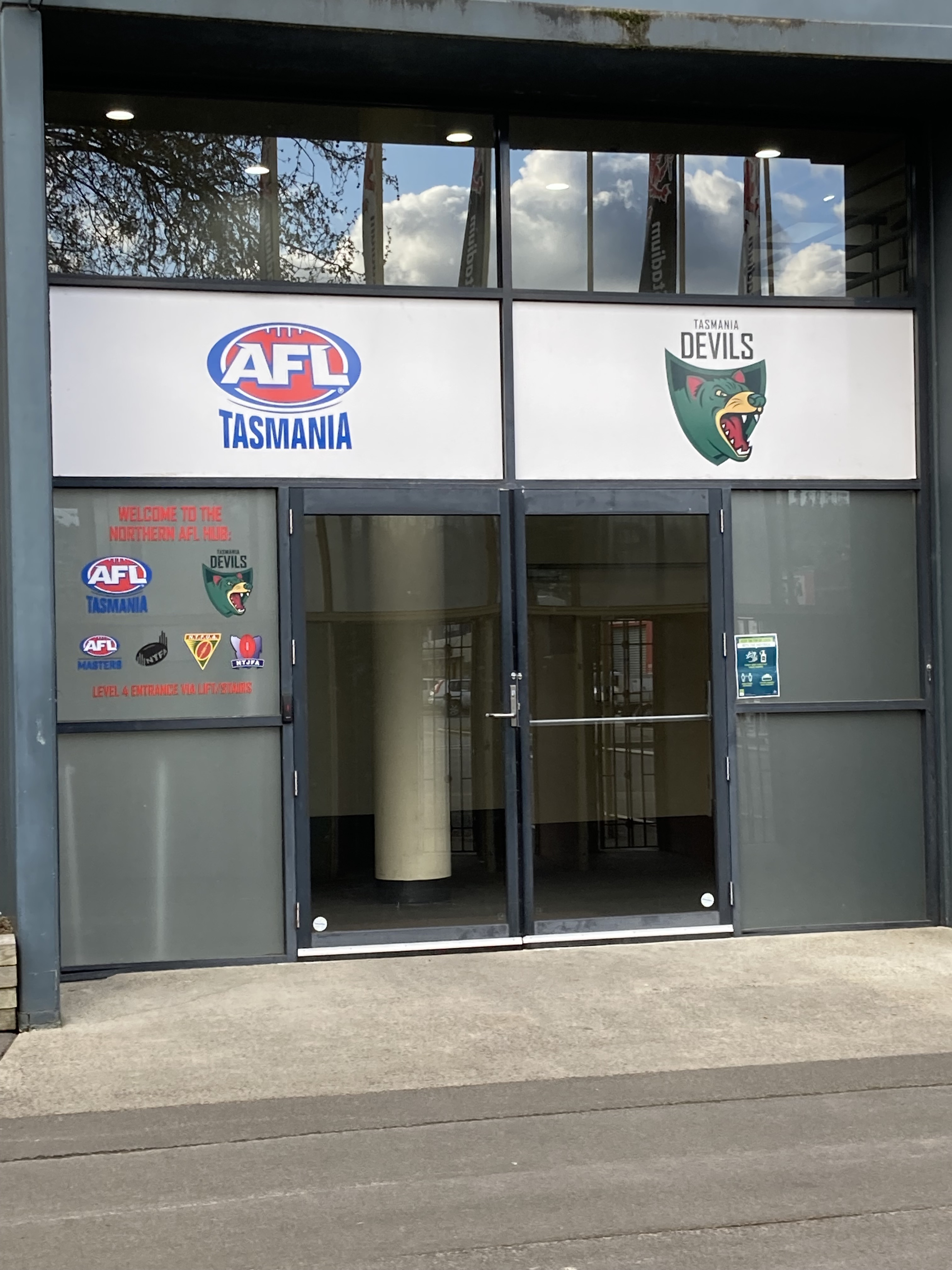
AFL Tasmania headquarters at UTas Stadium

AFL Tasmania is the Australian Football League (AFL) subsidiary in Tasmania and its governing body for Australian rules football in Tasmania. The organisation is responsible for AFL-linked Australian rules football development in the state.

The Tasmanian Football Association was formed on 12 June 1879 as the colony's first governing body for the sport. However, in February 1999 it was liquidated due to crushing debts. Football Tasmania, structured as a commission independent of clubs, was established in 1999. The body changed its name to AFL Tasmania in 2002 reflecting its control as a subsidiary of the AFL.

The former Victorian Football League club, the Tasmanian Devils Football Club, was also managed by AFL Tasmania.
